= Sweetwater Dam Naval Outlying Landing Field =

1940s US Navy runway in California

Coordinates: 32.693°N 117.042°W

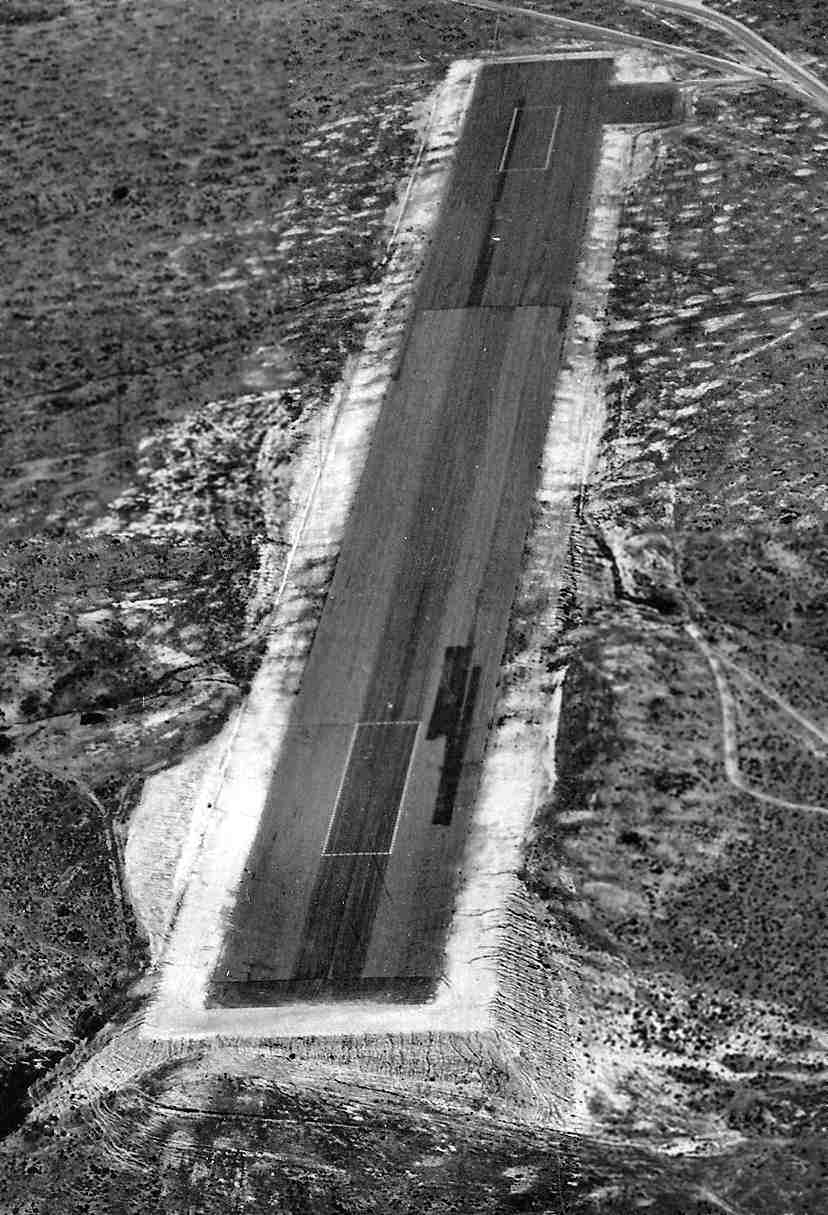
Sweetwater Dam Naval Outlying Landing Field in 1948

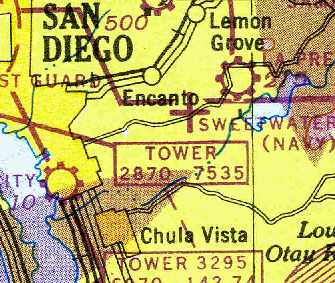
Sweetwater Dam Naval Outlying Landing Field on 1946 map

Sweetwater Dam Naval Outlying Landing Field was an airfield near Naval Auxiliary Air Station Brown Field and Naval Air Station North Island used to support the training of US Navy pilots during World War II. The runway, built in 1944, was located in what is now a neighborhood, eight miles east of San Diego, California. The Navy leased 135.45 acres of grassland from Rancho de la Nación to complete the airfield; it had a single 3,000-foot east/west asphalt runway. The airfield closed in 1946.

In 1949, the runway became a private civil airport, known as Sweetwater Dam Airport; it was also called Paradise Mesa Airstrip. The airport was named after the nearby Sweetwater Dam that makes Sweetwater Reservoir; it closed in 1951 and the runway became home to the Paradise Mesa Drag strip. Early drag racing clubs including the Bean Bandits had begun to use the airfield for unsanctioned, outlaw drag racing in 1949 with racers recounting that the airfield was still operational at the time. As the sport's popularity grew, the Carlsbad, California's Oilers Club, with the support of the city and local police converted the airfield into a drag strip to provide an alternative to dangerous street racing. The first official meet was held on March 11, 1951. At its peak, 25 clubs were using the strip. The drag strip closed in 1959.

Houses were built on the site, now called Paradise Hills; no trace of the runway can be found today. Today, part of the site is also Daniel Boone Elementary School.

== See also ==
- California during World War II
- American Theater (World War II)
- United States home front during World War II
