= Sweetwater River (California) =

River in the United States

Sweetwater River Agua Dulce
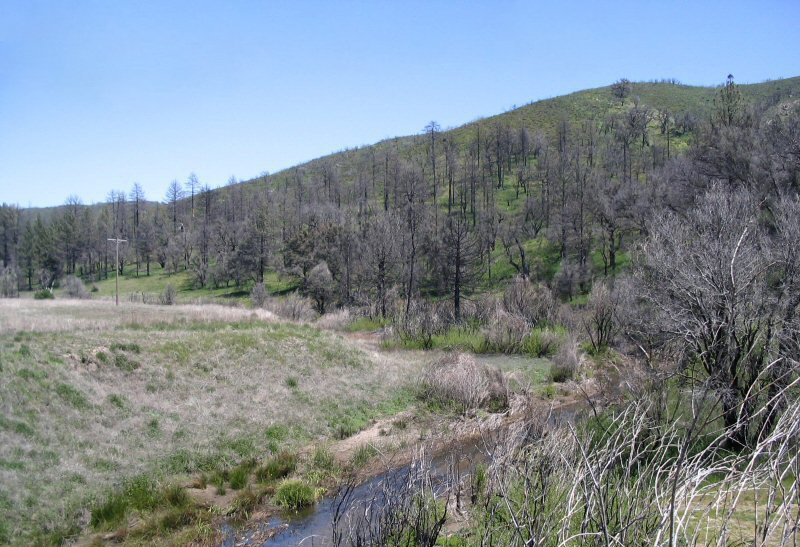
- The river's upper reaches near State Route 79

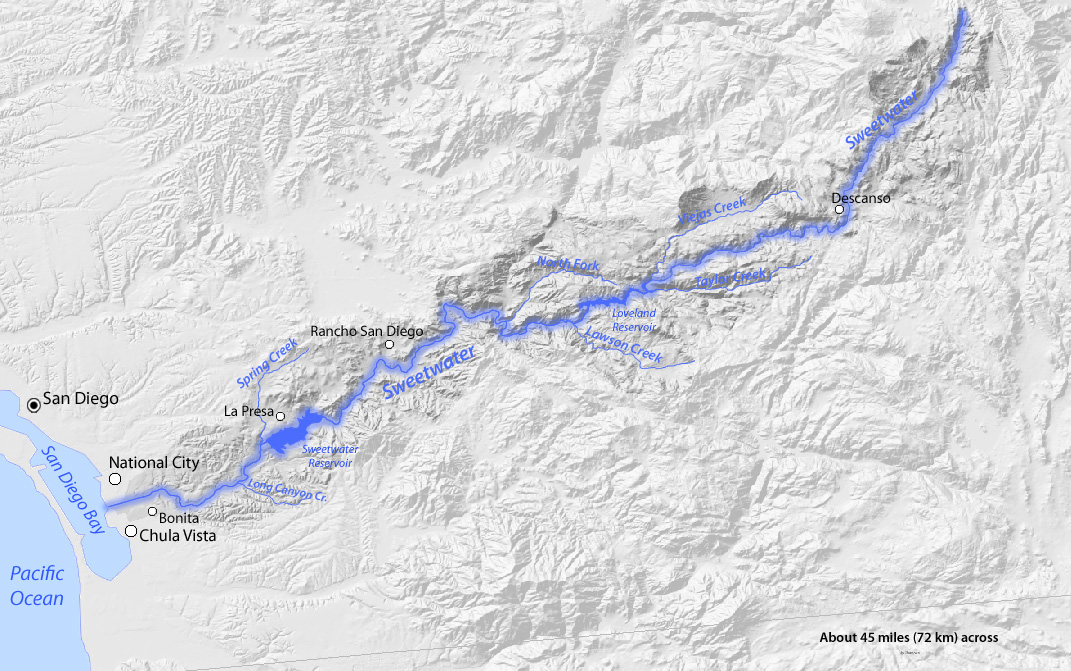
- Map of the river basin
- Etymology: Kumeyaay; "Ah-ha Ooo-mulk" meaning "water sweet" Spanish; "Agua Dulce" meaning "sweet water"

Location
- Country: United States
- State: California
- Region: San Diego County
- Cities: Descanso, La Presa, Bonita, National City, Chula Vista

Physical characteristics
- Source: Upper Green Valley
  - location: Cuyamaca Mountains
  - coordinates: 32°59′03″N 116°32′04″W
  - elevation: 4,809 ft (1,466 m)
- Mouth: Sweetwater Marsh
  - location: Between National City and Chula Vista
  - coordinates: 32°38′34″N 117°06′53″W
  - elevation: 13 ft (4.0 m)
- Length: 55 mi (89 km)
- Basin size: 230 sq mi (600 km^{2})
- Discharge
  - location: mouth
  - average: 14.7 cu ft/s (0.42 m^{3}/s)
  - minimum: 0 cu ft/s (0 m^{3}/s)
  - maximum: 45,500 cu ft/s (1,290 m^{3}/s)

Basin features
- Tributaries
  - right: North Fork Sweetwater River

The Sweetwater River is a 55-mile (89 km) long stream in San Diego County, California, USA. From its headwaters high in the Cuyamaca Mountains, the river flows generally southwest, first through rugged hinterlands but then into the urban areas surrounding its mouth at San Diego Bay. Its drainage basin covers more than 230 square miles (600 km^{2}), all of it within San Diego County.

Towns on the river include Descanso, La Presa and Chula Vista. The term "Sweetwater" is a name often given to freshwater which tastes good in regions where much of the water is bitter to the taste. The Spanish called the river "Agua Dulce", a name they applied to good clear water anywhere they lived.

== Course ==
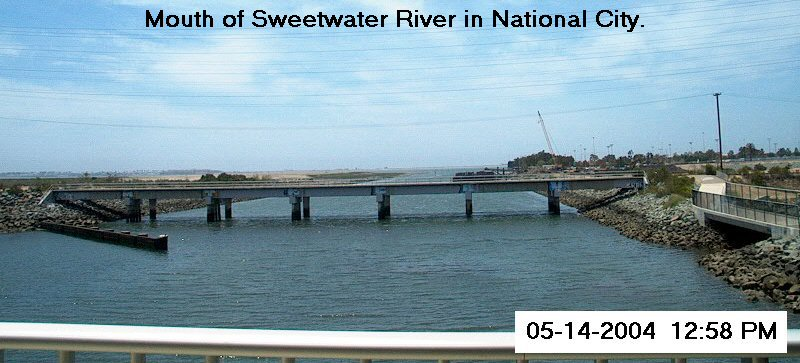
Mouth of the Sweetwater river

The river rises as an intermittent trickle flowing out of Upper Green Valley, deep in the semi-arid Cuyamaca Mountains near Stonewall Peak. It flows south-southwest, receiving Harper Creek from the left and Stonewall Creek from the right, then coursing through narrow valleys and passing the small town of Descanso. As the river enters the Cleveland National Forest, it cuts through a steep and spectacular rocky gorge and crosses under a high bridge of Interstate 8. Shortly after leaving the national forest, it flows into Loveland Reservoir, formed by Loveland Dam, the first of two major dams along the Sweetwater.

Continuing westwards, it receives the North Fork from the right, travels by the community of Rancho San Diego and passes through the Cottonwood Golf Club. The river then enters Sweetwater Reservoir, which is formed by Sweetwater Dam. Below the dam, the Sweetwater flows through Sweetwater Regional Park in a generally suburban area, passing the unincorporated town of Bonita. Bending northwest, the river enters a flood control channel and passes between National City and Chula Vista. California State Route 54 straddles the river, with eastbound lanes to the south and westbound lanes to the north, for a few miles between I-5 and I-805. The tidal portion of the river, which starts roughly here, is called the Sweetwater Marsh. The river empties into San Diego Bay about 7.5 miles (12.1 km) southeast of downtown San Diego.

== Watershed ==
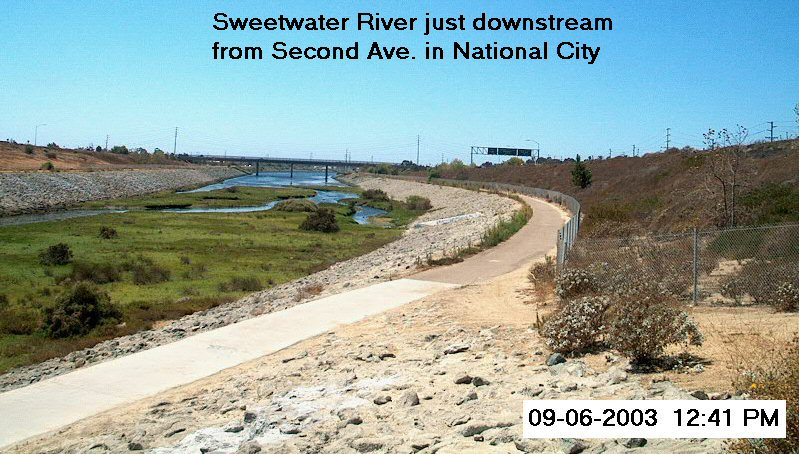
View of the Sweetwater River near its mouth on San Diego Bay

This river drains a long, narrow basin of 230 square miles (600 km^{2}) in extreme southern California, with its mouth less than 20 miles (32 km) north of the United States-Mexico border. Much of the river's watershed is mountainous, and the highest point is 5,730 feet (1,750 m) above sea level at Stonewall Peak in the Cuyamacas Mountains. A large portion of the drainage lies within the Cleveland National Forest, but few trees are actually supported by the arid climate. The Sweetwater is the largest river flowing into San Diego Bay.

Most of the drainage, nearly 64 percent, comprises wilderness or designated parks and open space. However, approximately 30% is urban development and part of the San Diego metro area. Native American reservations also occupy part of the land. The watershed has a human population of over 300,000; mostly residing in the residential cities of Chula Vista, National City, and others such as La Presa, Bonita and Rancho San Diego, all in the less rugged western portion of the basin.

The eastern drainage divide of the Sweetwater watershed lies on the main divide of the Cuyamacas, which also separates streams of the Pacific slope from streams draining to the endorheic basin of the Salton Sea farther to the east. To the north, the Sweetwater basin shares borders with those of the San Diego River and the smaller streams that drain portions of National City and San Diego. On the south, it is bordered by the Otay River and Tijuana River drainages – specifically for the Tijuana, the subwatershed of Cottonwood Creek, the river's main tributary in the U.S.

Before reaching San Diego Bay, the river flows into 316-acre (1.28 km^{2}) Sweetwater Marsh, a part of San Diego National Wildlife Refuge. Adjacent to the marsh is the Chula Vista Nature Center hosting nature walks and an aviary with native birds such as burrowing owls, egrets and herons, and storks.

== History ==
In pre-American times, the Sweetwater River was a small but year-round stream, lined on both banks by extensive riparian forests, marshes and floodplains. It is believed that humans first arrived in the San Diego Bay area between 20,000 and 30,000 years ago. The Kumeyaay called this river Ah-ha-ooo-mulk, meaning "water sweet". The villages they had included Sekwan and Hamacha on the middle portion of the stream; Amotaretuwe to the north, and Ekwiamak in the headwaters portion.

The first European to arrive in the region was probably Juan Rodríguez Cabrillo, who sailed his ship, the San Salvador, into San Diego Bay on September 28, 1542. Cabrillo did not stay in the area for long, but his visit helped Spain lay claim to the area. The Spanish established settlements in the area in the 1760s mainly clustering around Mission San Diego de Alcala, calling the river Agua Dulce. From 1795, the lower part of the watershed was part of the Rancho del Rey (Ranch of the King) under Spain, this land south of the Presidio of San Diego, that later became the Rancho de la Nación. In an attempt to save some of the lands of the San Diego Mission from secularization, their lands in the middle reach of the Sweetwater were given by the mission padres to Apolinaria Lorenzana in 1833. These lands became the Rancho Jamacha and Rancho San Juan de Las Secuas. Later, after passing from the hands of Mexico to the United States, emigrants began arriving in the San Diego area in great numbers, many of them settling along the Sweetwater, establishing irrigated farms. Sweetwater Dam was built in 1888 to provide storage for agricultural and municipal uses. By the late 1800s, the stream was described as having "practically no living water, except at its extreme sources and for 10 or 20 miles down from the summit of the range" presumably because of the large irrigation diversions.

== Dams ==
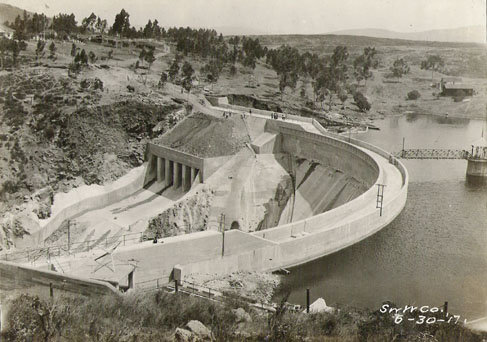
View of Sweetwater Dam, the lowermost dam on the river, in 1917

On its journey to the sea, the Sweetwater is interrupted by three dams. The first is Palo Verde Dam, a small rockfill structure about 2.5 miles (4.0 km) southeast of Alpine, serving mainly for recreation and flood control. Several miles below Palo Verde lies the much larger Loveland Dam (Sweetwater Falls Dam), which forms Loveland Reservoir. Below here, the Sweetwater is free flowing until about 8 miles (13 km) above the mouth, where Sweetwater Dam forms the last and largest, Sweetwater Reservoir.

Loveland and Sweetwater are both operated by the Sweetwater Authority. The former serves mainly for flood control while Sweetwater functions as a reserve water storage facility for the cities downstream, including San Diego, National City and Chula Vista and also as a terminus for piped-in water from the San Diego Aqueduct.

== Ecology ==
Recently the discovery of a western pond turtle (Actinemys marmorata), an IUCN Red List endangered species, in a tributary of the Sweetwater River near Jamul, California, alerted wildlife officials that the turtle is still extant in the area. The nearby San Diego National Wildlife Refuge is home to endangered birds such as the least Bell's vireo (Vireo bellii pusillus) and California gnatcatcher (Polioptila californica) and the rare Quino checkerspot (Euphydryas editha quino) butterfly.

It has been controversial whether beaver (Castor canadensis) were native to San Diego County. However, a report on the fauna of the county by Dr. David Hoffman in 1866 stated "Of the animal kingdom we have a fair variety: the grizzly bear, the antelope, the deer, the polecat, the beaver, the wildcat, the otter, the fox, the badger, the hare, the squirrel, and coyotes innumerable." Indirect evidence of beaver in San Diego County includes a creek named Beaver Hollow which runs 3.25 miles into the Sweetwater River about 6.5 miles southwest of Alpine. Beaver Hollow is named on the USGS Topo Map for Cuyamaca in 1903, which is twenty years before California Department of Fish and Game began beaver re-introductions in California.

The upper (above Descanso, California) Sweetwater River and several small tributaries hold wild rainbow trout (Oncorhyncus mykiss) populations, including Cold Springs Creek, Harper Creek, Japacha Creek, Jauquapin Creek, and Stonewall Creek.

== Recreation ==
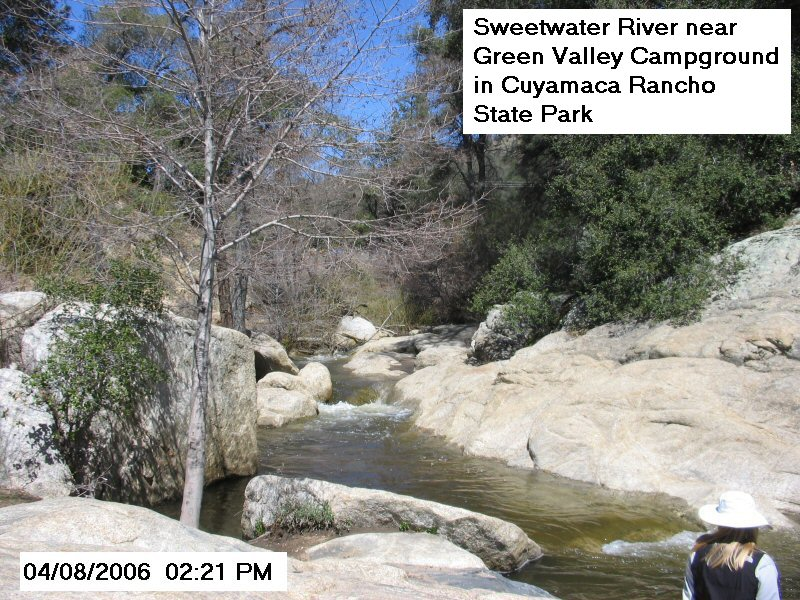
The river near Green Valley Campground

In the narrow area west of Sweetwater Reservoir and east of the 125 lay Sweetwater County Park and Sweetwater Regional Park, the latter located just southeast of the former. These parks have trails ranging along the east rim of a canyon, at the bottom of which runs the second San Diego aqueduct. These trails are open to hikers, cyclists and equestrians. There is a footbridge at the northern end running from Quarry Rd to the trails.

The canyon is vegetated by palm trees, cottonwoods, arroyo willows and eucalyptus. Cactuses include desert barrel and teddy-bear cholla.

Closer to the ocean is the Sweetwater Marsh National Wildlife Refuge. The Chula Vista Nature Center is located inside the refuge. The nature center is oriented towards elementary school children. Inside are terrariums and aquariums. Outside are aviaries containing injured birds.

The refuge can only be accessed by bus. At the entrance is a parking lot, where one can wait for the bus to arrive. Inside the reserve there are well-maintained trails leading down to the bay. Commonly seen birds include the great egret, osprey, towhee, mallard, pintail, white-crowned sparrow and dowitcher.

== Tributaries ==
Tributaries of the Sweetwater are listed from mouth to source:

- Rice Canyon
- Long Canyon
- Spring Creek (San Diego County)
- Dehesa Creek
- Harbison Canyon
- North Fork Sweetwater River
- Beaver Hollow Creek
- Lawson Creek (San Diego)
- Taylor Creek (California)
- Viejas Creek
- Samagatuma Creek
- Descanso Creek
- Juaquapin Creek
- Japacho Creek
- Cold Stream (San Diego)
- Harper Creek
- Stonewall Creek
