= Rancho San Juan de Las Secuas =

Historic ranch land in California

- Historic Ranch Land
- Nicknames: Rancho Secuan, Rancho Sequan
- Interactive map of Rancho San Juan de Las Secuas
- Coordinates: 32°35′47″N 117°05′20″W
- Founder: Apolinaria Lorenzana, Juan Bautista Lopez

Area
  - Total: 9,972 km^{2} (3,850 sq mi)

Rancho San Juan de Las Secuas also known as Rancho Secuan or Rancho Sequan was unusual in that it was originally a Mission land grant to Apolinaria Lorenzana and its next owner Juan Bautista Lopez failed in an attempt establish it as a Mexican land grant rancho of Alta California and abandoned it.

== History ==
In an attempt to preserve some of the best of the mission grazing lands from secularization, the Padres of the San Diego Mission in 1833 gave the grazing lands on the upper Sweetwater River near modern Dehesa to the faithful daughter of the church, Apolinaria Lorenzana, with appropriate certificates of the transaction. She similarly was given what became Rancho Jamacha and Rancho Cañada de los Coches. For these last two she was later to receive Mexican land grants.

Rancho San Juan de Secuas included the Kumeyaay rancheria of Sequan, which provided some of the ranch hands for the ranchos of Jamacha and Secuan. This rancheria later became the Sycuan Band of the Kumeyaay Nation and its site is now the location of the Sycuan Reservation.

Later Juan Bautista Lopez had purchased Rancho Secuan from Apolinaria Lorenzana, and on May 2, 1839 had petitioned for a grant to Rancho Secuan. The land was granted to him in 1839. Lopez and his family lived on the ranch but abandoned it in 1840 for reasons that are unknown, leaving the grant unclaimed. Perhaps it had been abandoned because of the 1837-1840s hostilities with the mountain Kumeyaay and rebellious Mission neophytes that drove many rancheros to abandon their ranchos east of San Diego at that time. It may have been because of conflict with the Sequan Rancheria that had provided labor and protection for the Secuan and Jamacha Ranchos while under the ownership of Doňa Lorenzana but may not have had the same enthusiasm for the new owner of Rancho Secuan.

By 1843, Lopez had moved to San Vicente Valley. In 1846, Lopez received a 13,316-acre (53.89 km2) grant in the valley for the Rancho Cañada de San Vicente y Mesa del Padre Barona from Pio Pico his former ally against governor Manuel Victoria in 1831. In 1850, he deeded that rancho to his nephew, Domingo Yorba, in return for his promise to care for his wife and himself in their old age. Rancho Secuan was not part of this arrangement.

The Rancho Secuan grant was never submitted to the Land Commission, unlike the Rancho Cañada de San Vicente which was submitted in 1852. It became public land, subsequently settled by homesteader John Stewart Harbison and is now the location of Dehesa.
