= California State Route 54 =

Highway in California

State Route 54
- SR 54 highlighted in red

Route information
- Maintained by Caltrans and San Diego County
- Length: 14.212 mi (22.872 km)
- Existed: 1961–present

Western section
- West end: I-5 in National City
- Major intersections: I-805 in National City
- East end: SR 125 near Spring Valley

Eastern section
- West end: SR 94 in Rancho San Diego
- East end: The El Cajon city limit

Location
- Country: United States
- State: California
- Counties: San Diego

Highway system
- State highways in California; Interstate; US; State; Scenic; History; Pre‑1964; Unconstructed; Deleted; Freeways
← SR 53	→ SR 55

State Route 54 (SR 54) is a state highway in the U.S. state of California that consists of two segments in San Diego County. The westernmost part of the highway is known as the South Bay Freeway, beginning at Interstate 5 (I-5) in National City and running along the Sweetwater River before ending at the intersection with SR 125 and Jamacha Boulevard near Spring Valley. SR 54 then resumes at SR 94 in Rancho San Diego as an undivided highway that leads to the city limits of El Cajon. County Route S17 (CR S17) connects the two portions of the highway; the center portion of SR 54 was never constructed.

The first section of the freeway opened in 1963, east of I-805. The extension of the freeway west to I-5 was delayed to coincide with the construction of the Sweetwater River flood channel. While construction started in 1984, a court stopped the process for a few years, and this portion was not complete until 1992. The final section of freeway, which was upgraded from an expressway, opened in 2007, to coincide with the extension of SR 125 south to Otay Mesa.

== Route description ==
Route 54 is defined in section 354 of the California Streets and Highways Code, and that the highway is "from Route 5 near the Sweetwater River to the southern city limits of El Cajon". The definition includes the gap that was never constructed. Also, control of the former eastern end of Route 54 within El Cajon's borders was relinquished by the state to the city. However, section 354 further mandates that the city "may not impose any special restriction on the operation of buses or commercial motor vehicles" on that relinquished former segment "if that restriction is in addition to restrictions authorized under other provisions of law".

SR 54 starts as a six-lane freeway from I-5 near the mouth of the Sweetwater River in National City. Both directions of the freeway are divided by the river; eastbound traffic traverses the south bank and westbound traffic traverses the north bank. The two sides join near the junction with I-805. The roadway continues east for several miles past the Westfield Plaza Bonita mall through suburban Paradise Hills in San Diego. As the freeway turns north in Bay Terraces, it merges with SR 125 north. The highways pass west of Sweetwater Reservoir and Sweetwater Summit Regional Park, and the western segment of SR 54 ends at the Jamacha Boulevard exit in La Presa. Jamacha Boulevard veers northeast as an undivided highway through Spring Valley until it reaches Campo Road; it is only designated as County Route S17 (CR S17), while some maps do consider this part of SR 54.

The eastern segment of SR 54 runs concurrently with SR 94 from Jamacha Boulevard east through the unincorporated, but commercially developed, area of Rancho San Diego, and follows Campo Road about one-half mile (800 m) east. Passing near Cuyamaca College, SR 54 and CR S17 continue northeast on six-lane Jamacha Road to El Cajon, while Campo Road and SR 94 split off to the southeast. East of Brabham Street, four-lane SR 54 continues through suburban development to where it currently ends at the El Cajon city limit, though Jamacha Road extends into the city to the route's previous terminus at the intersection with I-8.

SR 54 is part of the California Freeway and Expressway System, and is part of the National Highway System, a network of highways that are considered essential to the country's economy, defense, and mobility by the Federal Highway Administration. The route has three different names, including Jamacha Road from Campo Road to East Main Street in El Cajon, South Bay Freeway from I-805 to SR 94, and the Filipino-American Highway from the western terminus to SR 125. In early 2012, the interchange with I-5 was among the top ten most congested segments of highway in California Department of Transportation (Caltrans) District 11, which includes the San Diego metro area. In 2014, SR 54 had an annual average daily traffic (AADT) of 21,800 vehicles at the eastern end of the route, and 131,000 between I-805 and Reo Drive, the latter of which was the highest AADT for the highway.

== History ==
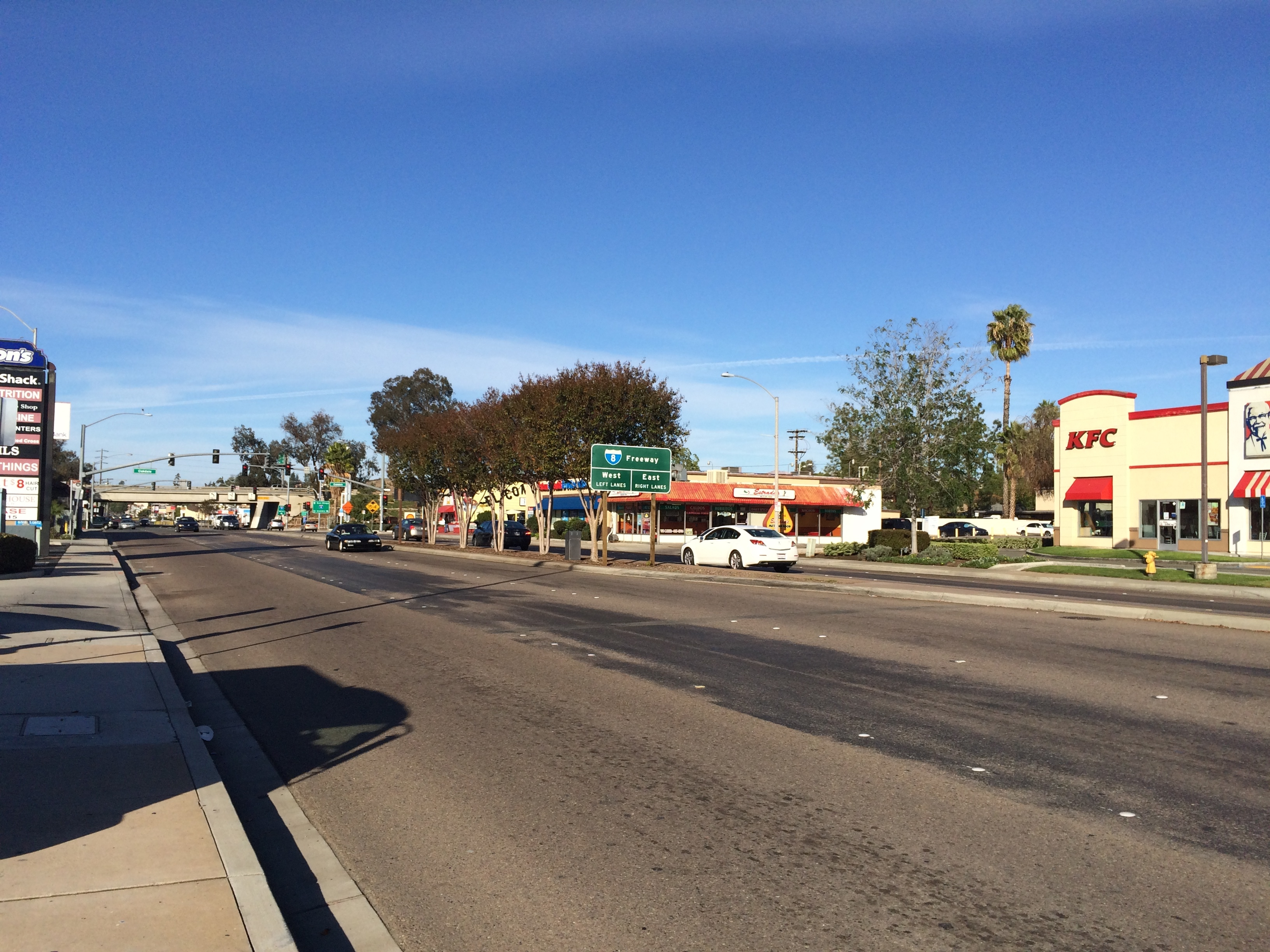
The intersection of former SR 54 with I-8

The earliest road with a similar route to SR 54 was mentioned in newspapers in 1908, and was paved by 1935. The South Bay Freeway was constructed next as an expressway from National City to Spring Valley. The freeway west to I-5 and the Sweetwater River flood channel were built at the same time, although both were delayed due to environmental concerns and litigation. In the late 1990s and the 2000s, the entirety of the western portion of SR 54 was converted to a freeway, while the entire portion inside the El Cajon city limits was returned to that city.

=== Early construction ===
A road through Jamacha is mentioned in The San Diego Union as early as February 1908, and was oiled in 1935 from US 80 (Main Street) around El Cajon to Sweetwater Valley and in other places by the Sweetwater River.

In 1956, the route of what would become the South Bay Freeway had been determined; it would run from Sweetwater Road in National City to Spring Valley and the intersection of Sweetwater Road and Jamacha Boulevard. Three years later, the California State Legislature added Route 280 from near the Sweetwater River to El Cajon to the state highway system. The South Bay Freeway was included in the county's 1960–1961 budget as the most important project. By 1961, E Street in Chula Vista continued along the Sweetwater River; it turned northeast and became Sweetwater Road before it entered into Lemon Grove.

Bids were accepted in November 1962 for the part of the freeway from eastern National City and Valley Road to La Presa and Jamacha Road; it was to loosely parallel Sweetwater Road. This portion of freeway opened on September 27, 1963, and the entire project cost $2.25 million (about $18 million in 2024 dollars); however, although it was a four-lane freeway, it was declared as an expressway since all intersections were at-grade intersections. While the road was originally planned to have eight lanes, only four were constructed due to the additional cost. Meanwhile, SR 54 was officially designated in the 1964 state highway renumbering as the road from I-5 near the Sweetwater River to I-8 in El Cajon, replacing Route 280.

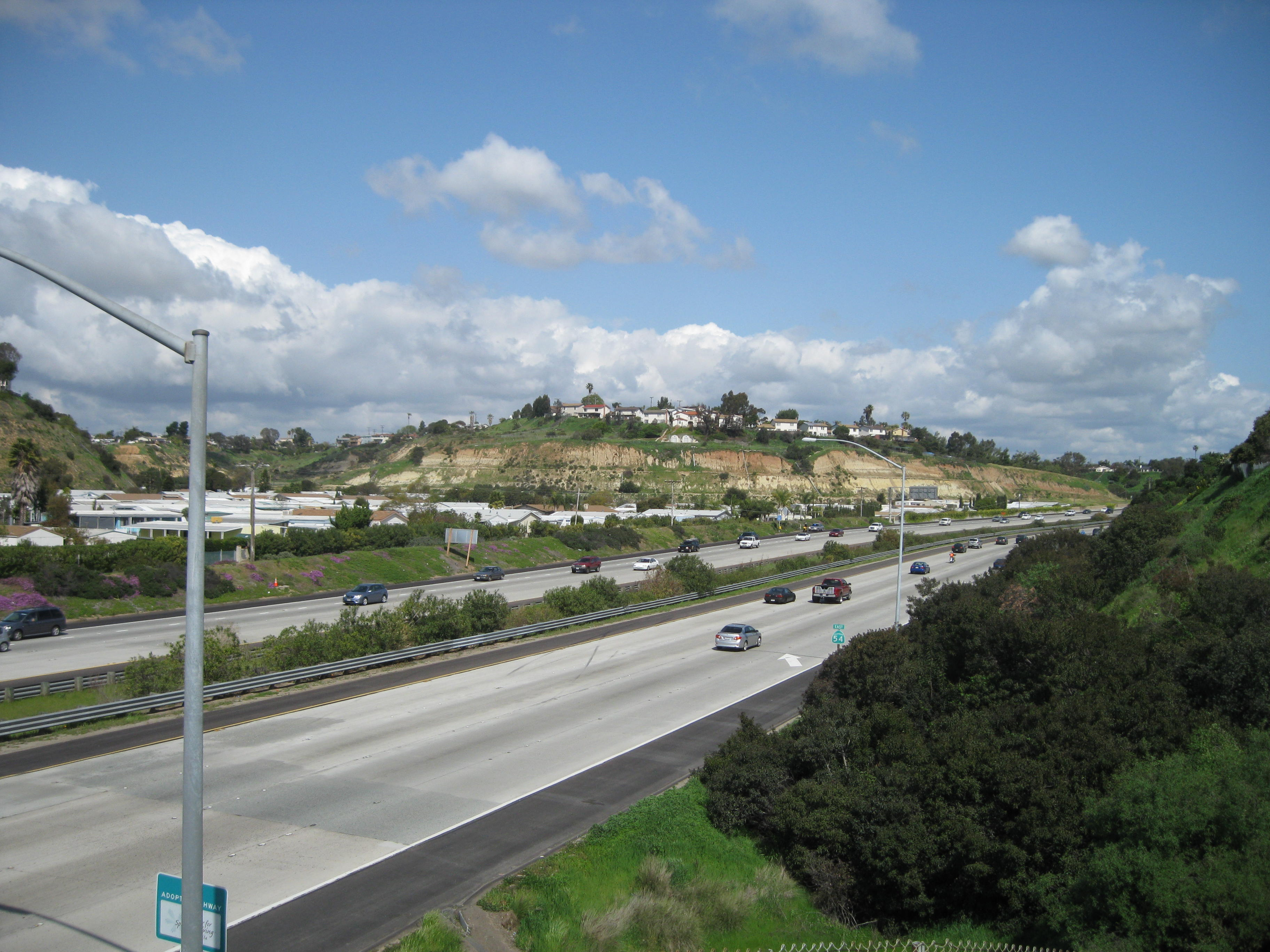
The South Bay Freeway east of I-805

=== Sweetwater River channel ===
SR 54 was extended west as a freeway to I-5 from I-805 at the same time the Sweetwater River flood control channel was built; the state proposed routing the flood channel in between the two roadways of the freeway in 1963, and it would also delineate the boundary between the cities of Chula Vista and National City. Later that year, the county proposed an extension of the freeway east to US 80 and Third Street in El Cajon. In 1966, the U.S. Army's Board of Engineers supported the construction of the flood channel, to protect future development in the surrounding region from floods; the integration of SR 54 was included in the proposal.

Two years later, county officials expressed concerns over the delay of state and federal approval and considered building the freeway without the flood control component of the project. The county hoped to build both projects at the same time to save $4 million (about $27 million in 2024 dollars) in costs. This was since it was estimated to require three years' worth of legislation to be accomplished in a single year by the county board of supervisors in order to use the Interstate Highway System funds that were set to expire in 1972. Congress approved the project, but in late 1968, the target date for completion of the system would be pushed back two years.

By 1971, the projected start of construction had slipped to within three to four years from then; however, Caltrans had approved the project. In July 1974, the California Coastal Commission unanimously decided to halt the entire project, since many of the necessary approvals from governmental bodies had not been obtained; this overrode an exemption granted by the San Diego Coast Regional Commission. Both the mayors of Chula Vista and National City were dismayed; Mayor Kile Morgan of National City stated that "we in the South Bay are getting tired of being kicked around", in reference to other stalled projects such as SR 157 and SR 125. Meanwhile, the interchange at I-805 was under construction, with completion scheduled for the next year. A U.S. Fish and Wildlife report predicted that the project would destroy 20 acres (8.1 ha) of marshland and harm three bird species that were endangered, among other negative environmental consequences; the conclusions were disputed by local officials.

In 1976, Caltrans said that SR 54 had not been included in plans for the next six years, due to a lack of funds and a shift in priorities from new roads to maintenance. The water subcommittee of the U.S. House of Representatives later recommended that the wildlife refuge be put on hold, since the U.S. Army Corps of Engineers (USACE) had not finished their proposal. Over the next few years, support for the project was expressed by a local citizens' group, the Chula Vista city council, and the San Diego Chamber of Commerce.

By 1980, the USACE was working to obtain funds, which was the major obstacle for completion; public concerns about the project were that it was not needed and would be too costly. The USACE announced in 1981 that an environmental impact report was necessary before the project could begin, after the Endangered Species Act of 1973; the least tern and light-footed clapper rail were considered endangered, and construction would have affected their habitat. The next year, the environmental impact report process began, financed by the USACE.

Work on the part west of I-805 and the I-5 interchange started in May 1984, with the construction of a detour for I-5; USACE paid for some of the costs, and federal funds related to the Interstate Highway System were also used. That same year, the county agreed to create a wildlife preserve on 188 acres (76 ha) of marshland to resolve the environmental concerns. Meanwhile, the existing part of the South Bay Freeway had become the "most dangerous five-mile stretch of highway in the county", as declared by the local fire chief, due to the 282 traffic accidents that had occurred on the road from 1977 to January 1985. By early 1986, the extension of the SR 54 freeway to El Cajon was declared a "lower priority" by Caltrans.

That year, the Sierra Club filed a lawsuit that halted progress on the project the next year, due to concerns about damage to the least tern and light-footed clapper rail bird populations caused by the construction of a nearby hotel and the roads to it would have. Chief U.S. District Judge Gordon Thompson stopped the work because the preserve had not been created. It was estimated that the shutdown resulted in the state losing $25,000 (about $59,000 in 2024 dollars) a day, as well as over 185 layoffs.

The U.S. Fish and Wildlife Service received 300 acres (120 ha) of land in the Sweetwater Marsh from the Santa Fe Land Company to mitigate environmental damage, and the lawsuit reached a settlement. Construction resumed in early November 1989. The halt meant that the project had to be rebid; one bridge was partially completed, and was thus known as "the bridge to nowhere". The eastbound roadway opened to traffic on December 10, 1990, at an approximate cost of $89.3 million (about $179 million in 2024 dollars). In 1992, during the construction process, mastodon bones and stone hammers were found. The items were dated to be older than 120,000 years old and may be some of the earliest signs of human settlement in North America. Other animal bones were found at the site, near Reo Drive in National City, including those of a bison, a camel, a gopher, and horses. The westbound roadway was completed in July 1992.

=== Later developments ===
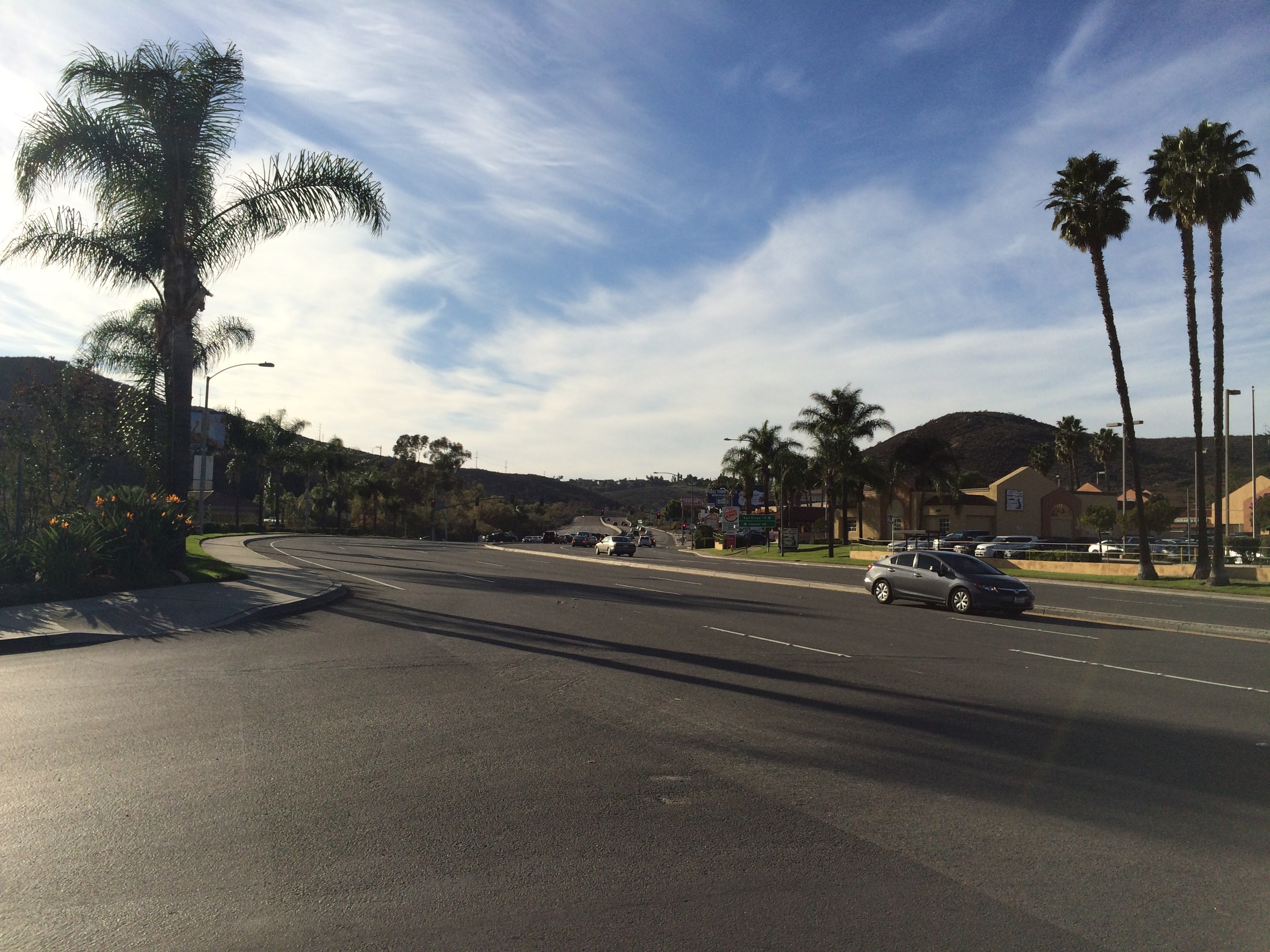
SR 94 westbound at the eastern intersection with SR 54

The expressway portion east of I-805 to South Worthington Street was upgraded to a freeway in the late 1990s, and an HOV lane opened in each direction, east of I-805 only. The first part from I-805 to near Woodman Street was finished in November 1993. The second part was to begin the construction phase in 1994; this was complete by 1998. The state legislature allowed for the relinquishment of SR 54 from the El Cajon city limit to I-8 to the City of El Cajon in 1999, and the transfer took place that year.

The remaining expressway portion of SR 54 was replaced by a freeway in two phases in the late 1990s and the 2000s. The first phase corresponded with construction of SR 125 north of Jamacha Boulevard to SR 94; construction began in 1996 and was completed in 2003. The second phase consisted of the construction of the SR 125 toll road and opened on November 19, 2007. While California Transportation Ventures owned the franchise on the tolled portion of SR 125, the interchange with SR 54 was constructed with $160 million (about $233 million in 2024 dollars) of public finances. From 2005 to 2007, 1,500,000 cubic metres (53,000,000 cu ft) of rock were blasted through in 160 separate explosions to allow for the interchange to be built. The project to convert the HOV lanes to regular mixed traffic lanes was authorized in 2006. Caltrans determined that the lack of space for law enforcement to pull over carpool lane violators, as well as a missing barrier that separated the HOV lanes from regular traffic, made the lanes less effective.

As of October 2014, Caltrans had considered relinquishing the eastern part of SR 54 from the SR 94 junction up to the El Cajon city limits to the County of San Diego. Two years later, the CTC approved a Caltrans proposal to revoke the proposed freeway status of the unconstructed portion of SR 54 since Jamacha Boulevard and the other existing roads would be able to handle the projected traffic load; this would allow the unused land to be sold.

== Major intersections ==
The entire route is in San Diego County.

Location	mi	km	Exit	Destinations	Notes
National City	0.000	0.000	1	I-5 (Montgomery Freeway)	Westbound exit and eastbound entrance; signed as exits 1A (south) and 1B (north); west end of SR 54; I-5 exit 9
National City	0.391– 0.396	0.629– 0.637	1C	National City Boulevard, Broadway	Westbound exit and eastbound entrance
National City–Chula Vista line	0.907– 0.912	1.460– 1.468	1D	Highland Avenue, 4th Avenue	Signed as exit 1 eastbound
National City	1.880	3.026	2	I-805 (Jacob Dekema Freeway)	I-805 north exit 8, south exit 9
National City–San Diego line	2.968	4.777	3	Plaza Bonita Center Way, Reo Drive	
San Diego	4.207	6.771	4	Woodman Street	
San Diego	4.994	8.037	5	Briarwood Road	
La Presa	6.028	9.701	6	SR 125 Toll south (South Bay Expressway) – Chula Vista	SR 125 north exit 11A
La Presa	6.353	10.224	–	SR 125 north	Eastbound exit and westbound entrance; east end of western section of SR 54; SR 125 south follows SR 54 west exit 6
Gap in route
Rancho San Diego	10.993	17.692		SR 94 (Campo Road) – Campo, San Diego	West end of eastern section of SR 54
Rancho San Diego	11.846	19.064		Willow Glen Drive – Jamul, Harbison Canyon	
El Cajon	14.212	22.872	East end of state maintenance at El Cajon city limit		
1.000 mi = 1.609 km; 1.000 km = 0.621 mi: Incomplete access; Tolled
