= 2026 Little League World Series results =

Children's baseball competition results

The results of the 2026 Little League World Series were determined between August 19 and August 30, 2026 in South Williamsport, Pennsylvania. Twenty teams were divided into two groups, one with ten teams from the United States and another with ten international teams, with both groups playing a modified double-elimination tournament. In each group, the last remaining undefeated team faced the last remaining team with one loss, with the winners of those games advancing to play for the Little League World Series championship.

Double-elimination
United States
United States	Winner's bracket								
United States	(Washington (state)) WA 2◄ (Alabama) AL 0 (F/7); Linescore	(Massachusetts) MA 1 (New Jersey) NJ 2◄ Linescore	(Ohio) OH 5 (Nevada) NV 6◄ Linescore	(California) CA 0 (Iowa) IA 1◄ Linescore	(Washington (state)) WA 4◄ (Texas) TX 3 Linescore	(Pennsylvania) PA 1 (New Jersey) NJ 3◄ Linescore	(Washington (state)) WA 0 (Nevada) NV 5◄ Linescore	(Iowa) IA 6◄ (New Jersey) NJ 0 Linescore	(Nevada) NV 14◄ (Iowa) IA 6 Linescore
United States	Loser's bracket								
United States	(Ohio) OH 10◄ (Massachusetts) MA 0 (F/4); Linescore	(California) CA 2 (F/4) (Alabama) AL 12◄ Linescore	(Ohio) OH 6◄ (Texas) TX 1 Linescore	(Pennsylvania) PA 5 (F/7) (Alabama) AL 6◄ Linescore	(Washington (state)) WA 2 (Alabama) AL 4◄ Linescore	(Ohio) OH 5◄ (New Jersey) NJ 2 Linescore	(Ohio) OH 11◄ (Alabama) AL 2 Linescore	(Ohio) OH 7◄ (Iowa) IA 1 Linescore	
International
International	Winner's bracket								
International	(Nicaragua) NIC 2◄ (Dominican Republic) DOM 1 Linescore	(Canada) CAN 0 (South Korea) KOR 7◄ Linescore	(Australia) AUS 1 (Mexico) MEX 7◄ Linescore	(Japan) JPN 0 (Curaçao) CUR 6◄ Linescore	(Nicaragua) NIC 6◄ (Panama) PAN 4 Linescore	(South Korea) KOR 5◄ (Czech Republic) CZE 0 Linescore	(Mexico) MEX 4 (Nicaragua) NIC 8◄ Linescore	(Curaçao) CUR 1◄ (South Korea) KOR 0 Linescore	(Curaçao) CUR 12◄ (Nicaragua) NIC 3 Linescore
International	Loser's bracket								
International	(Canada) CAN 4◄ (Australia) AUS 0 Linescore	(Japan) JPN 10◄ (Dominican Republic) DOM 1 Linescore	(Canada) CAN 3◄ (Panama) PAN 2 (F/7); Linescore	(Czech Republic) CZE 2 (Japan) JPN 3◄ Linescore	(Japan) JPN 3◄ (Mexico) MEX 1 Linescore	(Canada) CAN 5◄ (South Korea) KOR 1 Linescore	(Canada) CAN 3 (Japan) JPN 7◄ Linescore	(Nicaragua) NIC 1 (Japan) JPN 4◄ Linescore	
Single-elimination
International championship	Japan 0 Curaçao 4◄ Linescore								
United States championship	Ohio 2 (F/5); Nevada 12◄ Linescore								
Third place game	Ohio 2 Japan 3◄ Linescore								
World championship game	Curaçao 11◄ Nevada 2 Linescore								

== Double-elimination stage ==
=== United States ===
Upper round 1	Upper round 2	Upper round 3	Upper final	Final
August 21 – Game 10
August 19 – Game 2 (F/7)	Texas	3
August 23 – Game 17
(Washington (state)) Washington	2	Washington	4
Washington	0
Alabama	0	August 21 – Game 6
Nevada	5
Ohio	5
August 26 – Game 30
Nevada	6
Nevada	14
August 21 – Game 12
Iowa	6
August 19 – Game 4	Pennsylvania	1
August 23 – Game 19
Massachusetts	1	New Jersey	3
New Jersey	0
New Jersey	2	August 21 – Game 8
Iowa	6
California	0	August 29 – U.S. Championship (F/5)
Iowa	1	Nevada	12
Ohio	2
Lower round 1	Lower round 2	Lower round 3	Lower round 4	Lower final
August 25 – Game 28
August 24 – Game 22	New Jersey	2	August 27 – Game 34
August 22 – Game 14 (F/4)	Texas	1	Ohio	5	August 26 – Game 32	Iowa	1
Massachusetts	0	Ohio	6	Ohio	11	Ohio	7
Ohio	10	August 25 – Game 26	Alabama	2
August 24 – Game 24 (F/7)	Washington	2
August 22 – Game 16 (F/4)	Pennsylvania	5	Alabama	4
Alabama	12	Alabama	6
California	2

==== Winner's bracket ====
===== Game 2: Washington 2, Alabama 0 =====
August 19 3:00 pm EDT Howard J. Lamade Stadium
Team	1	2	3	4	5	6	7	R	H	E
Washington ◄	0	0	0	0	0	0	2	2	3	1
Alabama	0	0	0	0	0	0	0	0	1	3
WP: Winston Weaver (1–0) LP: Ryker Rasmus (0–1); Boxscore

===== Game 4: New Jersey 2, Massachusetts 1 =====
August 19 7:00 pm EDT Howard J. Lamade Stadium
Team	1	2	3	4	5	6	R	H	E
Massachusetts	0	0	1	0	0	0	1	4	2
New Jersey ◄	1	0	0	0	0	1	2	6	0
WP: Gabe Garcia Jr. (1–0) LP: Jude DeSimone (0–1); Home runs: MA: Anthony Sullivan (1); NJ: Mason Rincon (1); Boxscore

===== Game 6: Nevada 6, Ohio 5 =====
August 21 9:00 am EDT Howard J. Lamade Stadium
Team	1	2	3	4	5	6	R	H	E
Ohio	1	1	0	3	0	0	5	7	0
Nevada ◄	0	2	0	2	1	1	6	6	1
WP: Logan Edwards (1–0) LP: Walker Osborne (0–1); Notes: Rescheduled from August 20 due to rain. Boxscore

===== Game 8: Iowa 1, California 0 =====
August 21 12:00 pm EDT Howard J. Lamade Stadium
Team	1	2	3	4	5	6	R	H	E
California	0	0	0	0	0	0	0	0	0
Iowa ◄	1	0	0	0	0	0	1	2	0
WP: Cooper Thissen (1–0) LP: Noah Kirk (0–1); Home runs: CA: None; IA: Cooper Thissen (1); Notes: Rescheduled from August 20 due to rain. Boxscore

===== Game 10: Washington 4, Texas 3 =====
August 21 3:00 pm EDT Howard J. Lamade Stadium
Team	1	2	3	4	5	6	R	H	E
Washington ◄	2	0	2	0	0	0	4	7	1
Texas	1	1	0	0	1	0	3	6	1
WP: Winston Weaver (2–0) LP: Kase Yarbrough (0–1); Boxscore

===== Game 12: New Jersey 3, Pennsylvania 1 =====
August 21 7:00 pm EDT Howard J. Lamade Stadium
Team	1	2	3	4	5	6	R	H	E
Pennsylvania	0	0	0	0	1	0	1	6	0
New Jersey ◄	0	2	0	1	0	X	3	5	1
WP: Chase Klimkowski (1–0) LP: Cole Warner (0–1); Home runs: PA: None; NJ: Mason Rincon (2); Boxscore

===== Game 17: Nevada 5, Washington 0 =====
August 23 9:00 am EDT Howard J. Lamade Stadium
Team	1	2	3	4	5	6	R	H	E
Washington	0	0	0	0	0	0	0	2	3
Nevada ◄	0	0	0	0	5	X	5	11	0
WP: Brooks McFarland (1–0) LP: Kasen Workman (0–1); Boxscore

===== Game 19: Iowa 6, New Jersey 0 =====
August 23 1:00 pm EDT Howard J. Lamade Stadium
Team	1	2	3	4	5	6	R	H	E
Iowa ◄	2	0	1	0	0	3	6	8	0
New Jersey	0	0	0	0	0	0	0	1	1
WP: Anthony Johnson Jr (1–0) LP: Mason Rincon (0–1); Home runs: IA: Anthony Johnson Jr (1); NJ: None; Boxscore

===== Game 30: Nevada 14, Iowa 6 =====
August 26 3:00 pm EDT Howard J. Lamade Stadium
Team	1	2	3	4	5	6	R	H	E
Nevada ◄	0	0	0	4	1	9	14	10	2
Iowa	0	0	0	0	0	6	6	8	0
WP: Payton Hinsen (1–0) LP: Kannon Kane (0–1); Boxscore

==== Loser's bracket ====
===== Game 14: Ohio 10, Massachusetts 0 =====
August 22 3:00 pm EDT Howard J. Lamade Stadium
Team	1	2	3	4	5	6	R	H	E
Ohio ◄	0	1	7	2	–	–	10	5	0
Massachusetts	0	0	0	0	–	–	0	0	2
WP: Josiah Infante (1–0) LP: Luke Schlatz (0–1); Notes: Completed early due to the run rule. Massachusetts is eliminated. Boxscore

===== Game 16: Alabama 12, California 2 =====
August 22 7:00 pm EDT Howard J. Lamade Stadium
Team	1	2	3	4	5	6	R	H	E
California	0	1	0	1	–	–	2	6	4
Alabama ◄	0	3	4	5	–	–	12	8	1
WP: Urijah Berklite (1–0) LP: Isaac Ramirez Aguirre (0–1); Home runs: CA: None; AL: Cam Lee (1); Notes: Completed early due to the run rule. California is eliminated. Boxscore

===== Game 22: Ohio 6, Texas 1 =====
August 24 3:00 pm EDT Howard J. Lamade Stadium
Team	1	2	3	4	5	6	R	H	E
Ohio ◄	1	2	0	2	0	1	6	5	1
Texas	0	0	0	0	0	1	1	6	1
WP: Bob Frazier (1–0) LP: Merritt Cude (0–1); Notes: Texas is eliminated. Boxscore

===== Game 24: Alabama 6, Pennsylvania 5 =====
August 24 7:00 pm EDT Howard J. Lamade Stadium
Team	1	2	3	4	5	6	7	R	H	E
Pennsylvania	2	0	3	0	0	0	0	5	7	0
Alabama ◄	0	0	5	0	0	0	1	6	8	0
WP: Kinley Rasmus (1–0) LP: Cole Warner (0–2); Home runs: PA: Cole Warner (1); AL: None; Notes: Pennsylvania is eliminated. Boxscore

===== Game 26: Alabama 4, Washington 2 =====
August 25 3:00 pm EDT Howard J. Lamade Stadium
Team	1	2	3	4	5	6	R	H	E
Washington	0	0	0	1	0	1	2	5	3
Alabama ◄	1	0	2	1	0	X	4	6	0
WP: Jerry Taylor (1–0) LP: Frankie McCabe (0–1); Notes: Washington is eliminated. Boxscore

===== Game 28: Ohio 5, New Jersey 2 =====
August 25 7:00 pm EDT Howard J. Lamade Stadium
Team	1	2	3	4	5	6	R	H	E
Ohio ◄	0	0	0	5	0	0	5	7	0
New Jersey	0	0	0	0	1	1	2	6	0
WP: Boone Treadway (1–0) LP: Jett Bridges (0–1); Notes: New Jersey is eliminated. Boxscore

===== Game 32: Ohio 11, Alabama 2 =====
August 26 7:00 pm EDT Howard J. Lamade Stadium
Team	1	2	3	4	5	6	R	H	E
Ohio ◄	4	0	3	0	0	4	11	12	0
Alabama	1	0	1	0	0	0	2	5	1
WP: Bryson Williams (1–0) LP: Easton Allen (0–1); Notes: Alabama is eliminated. Boxscore

===== Game 34: Ohio 7, Iowa 1 =====
August 27 9:00 am EDT Howard J. Lamade Stadium
Team	1	2	3	4	5	6	R	H	E
Ohio ◄	4	1	0	0	0	2	7	12	0
Iowa	0	0	0	0	1	0	1	4	1
WP: Walker Osborne (1–1) LP: Kannon Kane (0–2); Notes: Iowa is eliminated. Boxscore

=== International ===
Upper round 1	Upper round 2	Upper round 3	Upper final	Final
August 21 – Game 9
August 19 – Game 1	Panama	4
August 23 – Game 18
Nicaragua	2	Nicaragua	6
Nicaragua	8
Dominican Republic	1	August 21 – Game 5
Mexico	4
Australia	1
August 26 – Game 29
Mexico	7
Nicaragua	3
August 21 – Game 11
Curaçao	12
August 19 – Game 3	(Czech Republic) Czechia	0
August 23 – Game 20
Canada	0	South Korea	5
South Korea	0
South Korea	7	August 21 – Game 7
Curaçao	1
Curaçao	6	August 29 – Int'l Championship
Japan	0	Curaçao	4
Japan	0
Lower round 1	Lower round 2	Lower round 3	Lower round 4	Lower final
August 25 – Game 27
August 24 – Game 21 (F/7)	South Korea	1	August 27 – Game 33
August 22 – Game 13	Panama	2	Canada	5	August 26 – Game 31	Nicaragua	1
Canada	4	Canada	3	Canada	3	Japan	4
Australia	0	August 25 – Game 25	Japan	7
August 24 – Game 23	Mexico	1
August 22 – Game 15	(Czech Republic) Czechia	2	Japan	3
Japan	10	Japan	3
Dominican Republic	1

==== Winner's bracket ====
===== Game 1: Nicaragua 2, Dominican Republic 1 =====
August 19 1:00 pm EDT Volunteer Stadium
Team	1	2	3	4	5	6	R	H	E
Nicaragua ◄	1	1	0	0	0	0	2	4	0
Dominican Republic	0	0	0	0	1	0	1	5	0
WP: Clemente Sevilla Pichardo (1–0) LP: Christofer Pichardo (0–1); Boxscore

===== Game 3: South Korea 7, Canada 0 =====
August 19 5:00 pm EDT Volunteer Stadium
Team	1	2	3	4	5	6	R	H	E
Canada	0	0	0	0	0	0	0	3	3
South Korea ◄	0	1	3	2	1	X	7	9	0
WP: Seo Jun Park (1–0) LP: Jacob Massel (0–1); Home runs: CAN: None; KOR: Ji Hwan Hong (1); Boxscore

===== Game 5: Mexico 7, Australia 1 =====
August 21 9:00 am EDT Volunteer Stadium
Team	1	2	3	4	5	6	R	H	E
Australia	0	0	0	0	1	0	1	5	3
Mexico ◄	3	0	2	0	2	X	7	3	0
WP: Jorge Fonseca (1–0) LP: Aaron Dare (0–1); Notes: Rescheduled from August 20 due to rain. Boxscore

===== Game 7: Curaçao 6, Japan 0 =====
August 21 12:00 pm EDT Volunteer Stadium
Team	1	2	3	4	5	6	R	H	E
Japan	0	0	0	0	0	0	0	0	0
Curaçao ◄	2	2	0	1	1	X	6	8	1
WP: Jaymiëll Martina (1–0) LP: Tensei Yazawa (0–1); Notes: Rescheduled from August 20 due to rain. Boxscore

===== Game 9: Nicaragua 6, Panama 4 =====
August 21 3:00 pm EDT Volunteer Stadium
Team	1	2	3	4	5	6	R	H	E
Nicaragua ◄	2	0	0	0	0	4	6	1	0
Panama	0	0	0	3	0	1	4	7	1
WP: Kendry Arauz Roque (1–0) LP: Josuê Hernández (0–1); Boxscore

===== Game 11: South Korea 5, Czechia 0 =====
August 21 6:00 pm EDT Volunteer Stadium
Team	1	2	3	4	5	6	R	H	E
South Korea ◄	0	0	1	0	1	3	5	8	0
Czechia	0	0	0	0	0	0	0	1	2
WP: Ha Jun Ju (1–0) LP: Tobiáš Pivoda (0–1); Home runs: KOR: Hyun Been Han (1); CZE: None; Boxscore

===== Game 18: Nicaragua 8, Mexico 4 =====
August 23 11:00 am EDT Volunteer Stadium
Team	1	2	3	4	5	6	R	H	E
Mexico	0	1	0	2	0	1	4	7	0
Nicaragua ◄	0	0	0	1	7	X	8	4	3
WP: Jose Martinez Padilla (1–0) LP: Emiliano Kerber (0–1); Boxscore

===== Game 20: Curaçao 1, South Korea 0 =====
August 23 2:00 pm EDT Volunteer Stadium
Team	1	2	3	4	5	6	R	H	E
Curaçao ◄	1	0	0	0	0	0	1	2	0
South Korea	0	0	0	0	0	0	0	3	0
WP: Juriënsly De Windt (1–0) LP: Ji Hwan Hong (0–1); Boxscore

===== Game 29: Curaçao 12, Nicaragua 3 =====
August 26 1:00 pm EDT Volunteer Stadium
Team	1	2	3	4	5	6	R	H	E
Curaçao ◄	0	10	0	0	0	2	12	11	2
Nicaragua	0	0	0	3	0	0	3	2	4
WP: Jaymiëll Martina (2–0) LP: Moisés Estrada Juaréz (0–1); Boxscore

==== Loser's bracket ====
===== Game 13: Canada 4, Australia 0 =====
August 22 1:00 pm EDT Volunteer Stadium
Team	1	2	3	4	5	6	R	H	E
Canada ◄	1	0	0	0	0	3	4	9	0
Australia	0	0	0	0	0	0	0	2	3
WP: Felix Hoyano (1–0) LP: Hikaru Kaneko (0–1); Home runs: CAN: Sha Hassko (1); AUS: None; Notes: Australia is eliminated. Boxscore

===== Game 15: Japan 10, Dominican Republic 1 =====
August 22 5:00 pm EDT Volunteer Stadium
Team	1	2	3	4	5	6	R	H	E
Japan ◄	3	0	2	1	4	0	10	10	0
Dominican Republic	0	0	1	0	0	0	1	3	5
WP: Shinnosuke Ijima (1–0) LP: Jostin Vega Nunez (0–1); Home runs: JPN: Tensei Yazawa 2 (2); DOM: None; Notes: Dominican Republic is eliminated. Boxscore

===== Game 21: Canada 3, Panama 2 =====
August 24 1:00 pm EDT Volunteer Stadium
Team	1	2	3	4	5	6	7	R	H	E
Canada ◄	0	0	0	0	0	0	3	3	1	1
Panama	0	0	0	0	0	0	2	2	3	1
WP: Cruz Krpan (1–0) LP: Dominick M. Saavedra Arauz (0–1); Notes: Panama is eliminated. Boxscore

===== Game 23: Japan 3, Czechia 2 =====
August 24 5:00 pm EDT Volunteer Stadium
Team	1	2	3	4	5	6	R	H	E
Czechia	1	0	0	1	0	0	2	5	0
Japan ◄	2	0	0	1	0	X	3	6	1
WP: Yunosuke Yabe (1–0) LP: Jan Lukšíček (0–1); Home runs: CZE: None; JPN: Yunosuke Yabe 2 (2), Takeru Yorozu (1); Notes: Czechia is eliminated. Boxscore

===== Game 25: Japan 3, Mexico 1 =====
August 25 1:00 pm EDT Volunteer Stadium
Team	1	2	3	4	5	6	R	H	E
Japan ◄	2	0	0	1	0	0	3	8	1
Mexico	0	0	0	1	0	0	1	4	2
WP: Tensei Yazawa (1–1) LP: Jorge Fonseca (1–1); Notes: Mexico is eliminated. Boxscore

===== Game 27: Canada 5, South Korea 1 =====
August 25 5:00 pm EDT Volunteer Stadium
Team	1	2	3	4	5	6	R	H	E
Canada ◄	4	1	0	0	0	0	5	7	1
South Korea	0	1	0	0	0	0	1	3	3
WP: Jean Ramos (1–0) LP: Ju Won Kim (0–1); Notes: South Korea is eliminated. Boxscore

===== Game 31: Japan 7, Canada 3 =====
August 26 5:00 pm EDT Volunteer Stadium
Team	1	2	3	4	5	6	R	H	E
Canada	0	0	0	1	2	0	3	5	1
Japan ◄	0	4	3	0	0	X	7	10	2
WP: Rui Tobata (1–0) LP: Felix Hoyano (1–1); Home runs: CAN: None; JPN: Taiga Yumitori (1); Notes: Canada is eliminated. Boxscore

===== Game 33: Japan 4, Nicaragua 1 =====
August 27 9:00 am EDT Volunteer Stadium
Team	1	2	3	4	5	6	R	H	E
Nicaragua	0	0	0	1	0	0	1	4	1
Japan ◄	0	0	0	1	3	X	4	8	0
WP: Shinnosuke Ijima (2–0) LP: Kendry Arauz Roque (1–1); Notes: Nicaragua is eliminated. Boxscore

== Single-elimination stage ==
=== International championship: Curaçao 4, Japan 0 ===
August 29 12:30 pm EDT Howard J. Lamade Stadium
Team	1	2	3	4	5	6	R	H	E
Japan	0	0	0	0	0	0	0	2	4
Curaçao ◄	0	0	3	1	0	X	4	4	0
WP: Jaymiëll Martina (3–0) LP: Yunosuke Yabe (1–1); Notes: Japan is eliminated. Boxscore

=== United States championship: Nevada 12, Ohio 2 ===
August 29 3:30 pm EDT Howard J. Lamade Stadium
Team	1	2	3	4	5	6	R	H	E
Ohio	0	1	0	1	0	–	2	5	1
Nevada ◄	1	5	0	2	4	–	12	13	1
WP: Owen Guzman (1–0) LP: Josiah Infante (1–1); Notes: Completed early due to the run rule. Ohio is eliminated. Boxscore

=== Third place game: Japan 3, Ohio 2 ===
August 30 10:00 am EDT Howard J. Lamade Stadium
Team	1	2	3	4	5	6	R	H	E
Ohio	0	0	0	2	0	0	2	6	1
Japan ◄	0	0	0	0	0	3	3	7	2
WP: Tensei Yazawa (2–1) LP: Bryson Williams (1–1); Boxscore

=== World championship game: Curaçao 11, Nevada 2 ===
August 30 3:00 pm EDT Howard J. Lamade Stadium
Team	1	2	3	4	5	6	R	H	E
Curaçao ◄	0	0	2	2	4	3	11	12	1
Nevada	0	2	0	0	0	0	2	5	0
WP: Juriënsly De Windt (2–0) LP: Payton Hinsen (1–1); Notes: Curaçao wins the Little League World Series. Boxscore
