= Bonnie Brae Lemon =

Variety of fruit

- Cultivar: Bonnie Brae
- Origin: Bonita, California

The Bonnie Brae was a popular variety of lemon in the late 1800s through early 1900s that was first cultivated in Bonita, California, near San Diego. No Bonnie Brae producing trees are known to currently exist, although there may be some still growing in Southern California that have not been identified as such.

== History ==
Bonnie Brae lemons were first grown by Hiram Murray Higgins on his 76-acre Bonnie Brae Ranch in Bonita. Higgins had been a successful music publisher in Chicago, and moved to San Diego County for his health, and to get into the burgeoning citrus business in California. He purchased his ranch in 1871 and began cultivating citrus orchards.

The Bonnie Brae lemon has been described as having a thin rind, oblong in shape, and seedless. Some speculated that the fruit was a lemon-lime hybrid, but Higgins claimed it was not.

In 1889, Higgins described how his special variety of lemon came to be. "I went to San Francisco and bought two barrels of the finest Messina lemons, raised in Sicily; brought them home and let them rot in the barrels. Sowed the seeds in beds, transplanted in the nursery, and in due time into the orchard. When the trees came into bearing, I had every variety from the coarsest citron to the finest lemon, the Bonnie Brae. I took the Bonnie Brae up to San Francisco and submitted them to experts. They were astonished. They said it must be a cross with the lime, but it isn’t for there were no limes on the place."

In the same article, Higgins credited the San Diego climate and the soil on his ranch for the special lemon variety. Higgins budded the Bonnie Brae to lemon trees that had borne poor fruit, and also onto orange tree stock. He found the latter to be best.

== Acclaim ==
In 1885, citrus expert William Spalding wrote, "My attention was first called to the Bonnie Brae by a plate of the fruit on exhibition in the Los Angeles Citrus Fair of 1880. So different was this fruit from other varieties of lemons on display that people were at a loss whether to class it as a lemon at all."

Bonnie Brae won the top ribbon at the 1885 New Orleans World's Fair. After the success of his groves, Higgins began to sell cuttings of his Bonnie Brae lemon trees to other interested growers. One of these was Henry Ernest Cooper, who named his orchards Bonita Ranch after a local pond called Bonita Laguna. The lemon industry was in full swing by the time a group of financiers bought out Cooper's groves and created the Sweetwater Fruit Company.

During the 11th State Fruit Growers Convention, held at National City, California, in April 1889, it is stated that "The largest and finest exhibition of lemons comes from the ranch of H.M. Higgins, on the Sweetwater Valley mesa. It consists of seedling lemons and the Bonnie Brae, a very thin skinned, juicy fruit of fine qualities, possessing many of the properties of the lime."

However, according to an 1889 interview with L.M. Holt, a citrus expert from San Bernardino, California, "It was thought that at one time [the Bonnie Brae] was going to revolutionize the lemon interests in Southern California. There were several parties who budded from that, and it was finally dropped, and have not seen any of that fruit for four or five years. I do not know if it is in existence to-day or not; yet it was a very fine fruit of its kind. But the Bonnie Brae is not the shape of a lemon; it is the shape of a lime."

Higgins died in 1897, age 77, and the Bonnie Brae Ranch was sold.

== Downfall of the lemon industry ==
In the early 1900s, a series of calamities severely hurt the lemon industry in San Diego. There was a water drought that began about 1912, a freeze in 1913, and a devastating flood in 1915.

In a 1918 article, then Bonnie Brae Ranch manager C.J. Scott wrote, "But owing to this very thin rind and its habit for splitting, [the Bonnie Brae lemon] did not prove to be a good commercial variety. I have left but one [tree] of this variety standing as a memento to the famous lemon." The Bonnie Brae Ranch made way for the Bonita Woods subdivision in 1961.
