= Kumeyaay Park =

Park in Chula Vista, California

Coordinates: 32.644°N 117.007°W

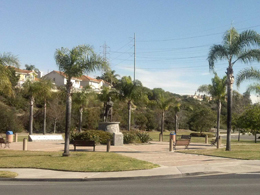
- Kumeyaay Park in Chula Vista, CA
- Interactive map of Kumeyaay Park
- Location: Chula Vista, California, U.S.

Kumeyaay Park of Chula Vista (formerly Discovery Park) is a 20.4-acre (0.083 km^{2}) park in Chula Vista, California.

== History ==
In 2018, the park was the center of a scandal involving an alleged middle school fight club, with students from nearby Bonita Vista Middle School reportedly organizing fights and uploading videos to Instagram.

A statue of Christopher Columbus in the park was vandalized in February, 2019, with red paint splattered on it and graffiti. A bronze plaque previously attached to the statue had been stolen. The statue was put in storage in June 2020 in anticipation of a George Floyd protest. On May 25, 2021, the city voted to permanently remove it.

On November 1, 2022, the Chula Vista City Council unanimously voted to rename it "Kumeyaay Park of Chula Vista", after the Kumeyaay Nation whose unceded territory it sits in.

== See also ==
- List of monuments and memorials removed during the George Floyd protests
- Rice Canyon

== External sites ==
- Kumeyaay Park of Chula Vista on ChulaVista.org
