= Rancho Cañada de los Coches =

Mexican land grant in present-day San Diego County, California

- Former land grant
- Interactive map of Rancho Cañada de los Coches
- Established: 1846
- Founder: Felipe Castillo

Area
  - Total: 9,972 km^{2} (3,850 sq mi)
- Time zone: UTC−8 (Pacific Time Zone)
  - Summer (DST): UTC−7 (Pacific Daylight Time)
- 32°50′14″N 116°54′05″W
- Location: 13468 Old Hwy 80, Lakeside, California

California Historical Landmark
- Designated: 1949
- Reference no.: 425

Rancho Cañada de los Coches was a 28-acre (0.11 km^{2}) Mexican land grant in present-day San Diego County, California, given in 1843 by Governor Manuel Micheltorena to Apolinaria Lorenzana. This small land grant was located just west of Flinn Springs and in the center of Rancho El Cajon. The San Diego Mission fathers formerly watered their swine in dry seasons at a little spring arising from subterranean sources, thus giving it its name of "Glen of the Hogs". The site is now registered as California Historical Landmark #425.

== History ==
Apolinaria Lorenzana (1790–1884) came to California with her mother in 1800. When her mother returned to Mexico, Apolinaria moved to San Diego, under the care of Raymundo Carrillo. Apolinaria Lorenzana remained a single woman devoted to the church. As a result of her religious devotion, she was called "La Beata", meaning "the pious one". Because of her devotion to the church the Padres at the San Diego Mission attempted to save some of the lands of the church from the secularization of its lands by giving her certificates for them as their owner in 1833–34. These were Cañada de los Coches, Rancho Jamacha and Rancho San Juan de Las Secuas. Lorenzana sold Rancho San Juan de Las Secuas to Juan Bautista López who solicited a grant for the land in 1836. She obtained grants for Jamacha in 1840 and Los Coches in 1843.

Lorenzana continued to live at the San Diego Mission but hired majordomos to run her ranches and she would stay there occasionally. Following a further decline in the Mission, Lorenzana moved to San Juan Capistrano in 1846.

Lorenzana sold her Rancho Canada de los Coches to Anacleto Lestrade, a native of France, and a priest at the San Gabriel Mission 1851 -56. Lestrade was also the claimant for Rancho Rosa Castilla.

With the cession of California to the United States following the Mexican-American War, the 1848 Treaty of Guadalupe Hidalgo provided that the land grants would be honored. As required by the Land Act of 1851, a claim was filed with the Public Land Commission in 1852, and the grant was patented to Anacleto Lestrada in 1873.
