= Statue of Christopher Columbus (Chula Vista, California) =

Statue of Christopher Columbus, formerly installed in Chula Vista, California, U.S.

- Artist: Mario Zamora
- Medium: Bronze sculpture
- Subject: Christopher Columbus
- Dimensions: 1.8 m × 0.91 m × 0.61 m (6 ft × 3 ft × 2 ft)
- Location: Chula Vista, California, U.S.; 32.6436°N 117.0103°W

A statue of Christopher Columbus by Mario Zamora was installed in Chula Vista, California's formerly named Discovery Park, in the United States. The statue has been vandalized multiple times.

The statue was installed in 1991 as part of the Columbus Quincentenary. It was surveyed by the Smithsonian Institution's "Save Outdoor Sculpture!" program in 1993.

It was removed and placed into storage in June 2020. The park named after Columbus's so-called "discovery" of America was renamed in 2022.

== Description ==
The memorial depicts Christopher Columbus with his arms crossed over his chest and holding a telescope. The bronze sculpture measures approximately 6 x 3 x 2 ft and rests on a 6-ft tall granite base with a 6-ft diameter. A plaque reads: "Columbus found a world, and had no chart / save one that faith deciphered in the skies / to trust the soul's invincible surmise / was all his science and his only art / George Santayana / Dedicated to the people of Chula Vista by the Rancho Del Rey partnership / a joint venture between McMillin Communities and Home Capital".

== See also ==
- List of monuments and memorials to Christopher Columbus
- List of monuments and memorials removed during the George Floyd protests
