= Rancho Jamacha =

Mexican land grant in California

Coordinates: 32.720°N 116.960°W

- Land Grant
- Interactive map of Rancho Jamacha
- Country: Mexico
- State: California
- County: San Diego
- Established: 1840
- Founder: Apolinaria Lorenzana

Rancho Jamacha was a 8,881-acre (35.94 km^{2}) Mexican land grant in present-day San Diego County, California, given in 1840 by Governor Juan Alvarado to Apolinaria Lorenzana. Jamacha is an Indian name. The grant extended eastward from Rancho de la Nación along the Sweetwater River Valley. The southwestern section of the rancho is now covered by the waters of Sweetwater Reservoir created in 1888.

== History ==
Apolinaria Lorenzana (1790–1884) came to California with her mother in 1800. When her mother returned to Mexico, Apolinaria moved to San Diego, under the care of Raymundo Carrillo. Apolinaria Lorenzana remained a single woman devoted to the church. As a result of her religious devotion, she was called "La Beata", meaning "the pious one".

In 1840, Lorenzana received a two square league grant of some of the San Diego Mission's grazing land. She was also grantee of the small Rancho Cañada de los Coches. Lorenzana continued to live at the mission. Following a further decline in the San Diego Mission, Lorenzana moved to San Juan Capistrano in 1846, hiring John (Don Juan) Forster as her agent for Rancho Jamacha.

With the cession of California to the United States following the Mexican-American War, the 1848 Treaty of Guadalupe Hidalgo provided that the land grants would be honored. As required by the Land Act of 1851, a claim was filed for Rancho Jamacha with the Public Land Commission in 1852, and the grant was patented to Apolinaria Lorenzana in 1871.

Unlike northern California, where gold seekers constituted the majority of new emigrants, military men made up most of the Americans in the San Diego area following the Mexican–American War. Among the newly arrived military personnel were Colonel John Bankhead Magruder, First Lieutenant Asher R. Eddy, Eugene B. Pendleton, Frank Ames, and Robert Kelly. John Bankhead Magruder (1807-1871), a native of Virginia, graduated from West Point in 1830 and came to California with the US Army forces occupying California following the Mexican–American War. Asher R. Eddy(1823-1879), of Colonel Magruder's staff, graduated from West Point in 1844. Robert Kelly (1825–1890) was a native of the Isle of Man who came to the United States with his family in 1841, and arrived in San Diego in 1851.

In 1851, Magruder obtained permission from John Forster to graze the Army's livestock on Rancho Jamacha. In 1853, Colonel Magruder purchased the Rancho Jamacha from Lorenzana, and sold an undivided two-thirds to Eddy, Kelly, Ames, and Pendleton. Colonel Magruder financed the purchase through a mortgage made by Lorenzana. In 1860 Lorenzana sold the mortgage to Eddy, ending her ownership, and she moved to Santa Barbara. Kelly sold his interest in Rancho Jamacha in 1858, and was a merchant in San Diego until in 1860, when he acquired Rancho Agua Hedionda.

In the middle 1860s, the price of cattle collapsed, and ownership of Rancho Jamacha began to be divided among a number of individuals. In 1869, Eddy sold all of Rancho Jamacha to his wife - even though Magruder, Pendleton, and Ames, still held their respective interests. Rancho Jamacha was further divided between 1872 and 1880. Ownership of the property had become even more confused, when in 1878, Lorenzana sold Rancho Jamacha to Monica Romero de Ruiz of Santa Barbara - even though Lorenzana no longer held legal title. The division of Rancho Jamacha amongst the various claimants was decided in a partition suit brought in 1881.
