= Loveland Dam =

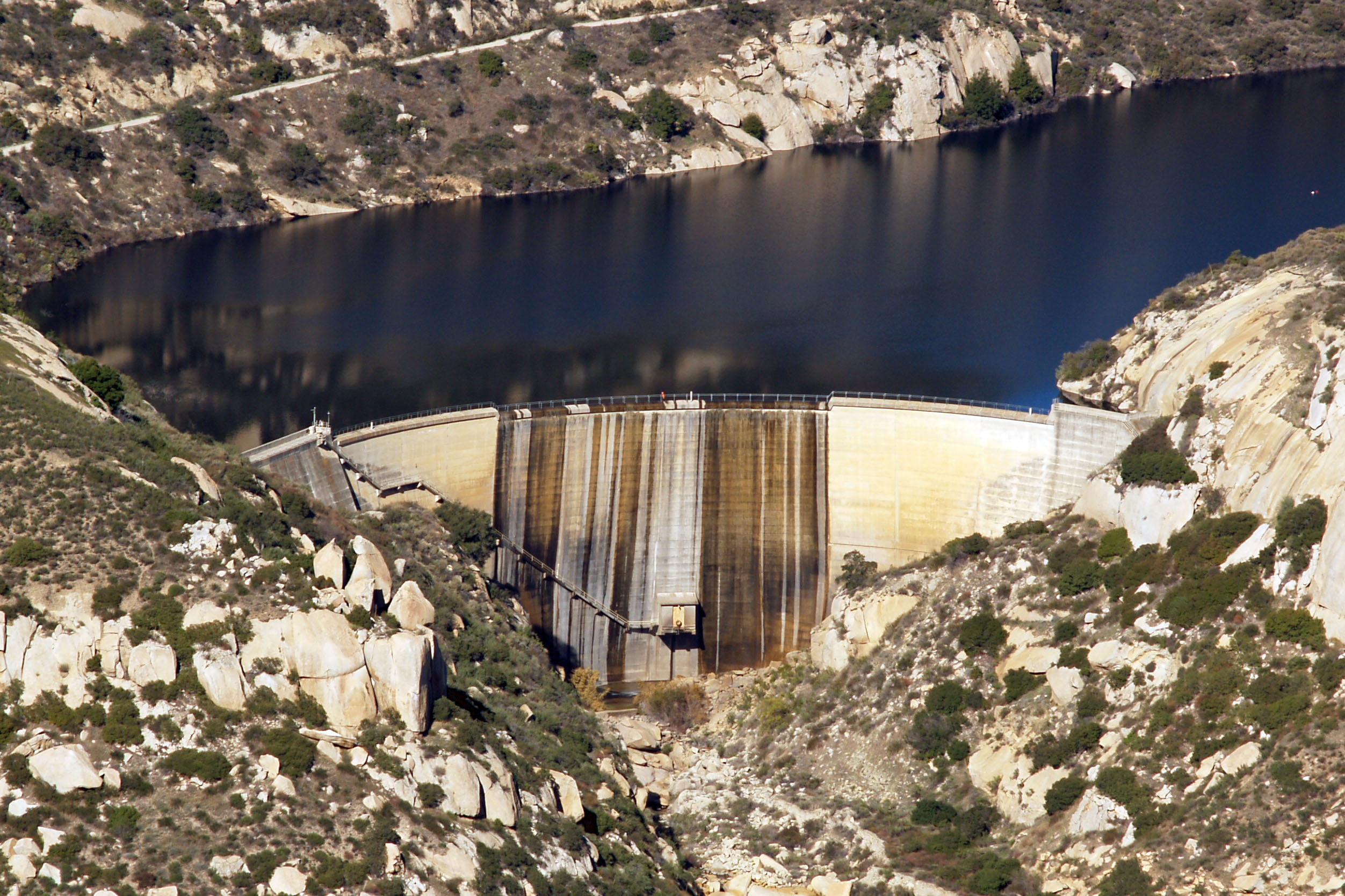
- Loveland Dam, 2011
- Interactive map of Loveland Dam
- Country: United States
- Location: San Diego County, California
- Coordinates: 32°46′54″N 116°47′39″W
- Status: In use
- Opening date: 1945; 81 years ago
- Owner: Sweetwater Authority

Dam and spillways
- Type of dam: Concrete thin arch
- Impounds: Sweetwater River
- Height: 203 ft (62 m)
- Length: 765 ft (233 m)
- Spillways: 1
- Spillway type: Uncontrolled over-the-crest
- Spillway capacity: 62,000 cu ft/s (1,800 m^{3}/s)

Reservoir
- Creates: Loveland Reservoir
- Total capacity: 25,387 acre⋅ft (31,314,000 m^{3})
- Catchment area: 98 mi^{2} (250 km^{2})
- Surface area: 454 acres (184 ha)

Loveland Dam (also called Sweetwater Falls Dam) is a dam across the Sweetwater River in San Diego County, California. The dam forms the long, narrow Loveland Reservoir, which stores 25,387 acre-feet (31,314,000 m^{3}) of water. It is operated primarily for flood control and municipal water storage in conjunction with downstream Sweetwater Dam. The reservoir is also open to the public for fishing.

The dam stands 203 feet (62 m) high and spans 765 feet (233 m) across the narrow gorge of the Sweetwater River, 2.4 miles (3.9 km) south of Alpine. It is built entirely of concrete and has a thin arch design. Loveland Dam is the younger of the two dams on the Sweetwater River; the other, Sweetwater Dam, was built in 1888, while Loveland was constructed in 1945.

The dam is named after Chester H. Loveland, president of the California Water and Telephone Corporation, the firm that built it. The Loveland Reservoir is considered a better water storage facility than Sweetwater because of its much smaller surface area (454 acres compared to 960) and comparable capacity, thus it is less vulnerable to evaporation.

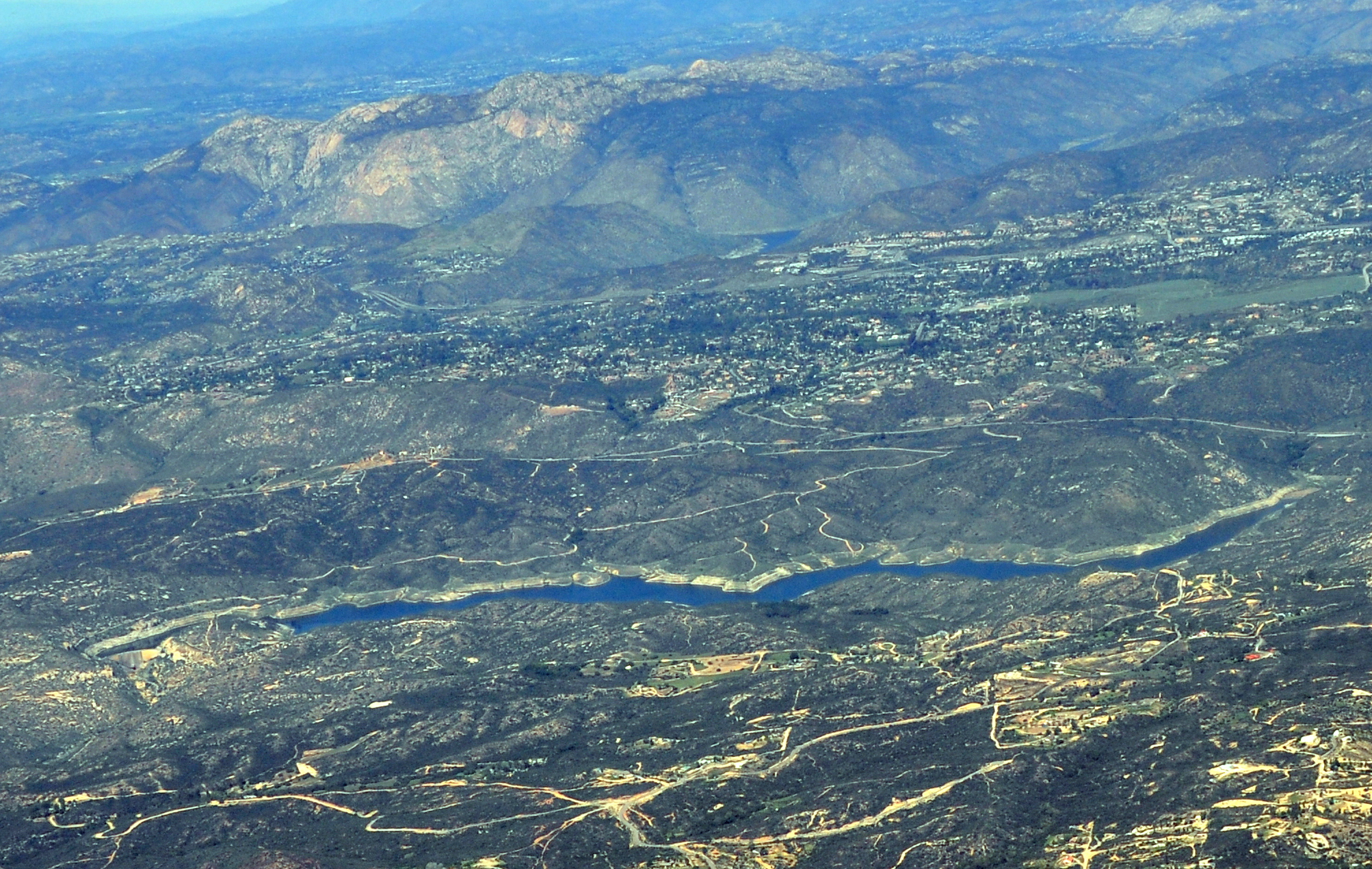
Aerial view of Loveland Reservoir from south

== See also ==
- List of dams and reservoirs in California
- List of lakes in California
