= Bonita, California =

- census-designated place
- Interactive map of Bonita, California
- Location in California Location in the United States
- Coordinates: 32°39′30″N 117°2′7″W
- Country: United States
- State: California
- County: San Diego
- Year founded: 1884

Area
  - Total: 5.15 sq mi (13.35 km^{2})
  - Land: 5.02 sq mi (12.99 km^{2})
  - Water: 0.14 sq mi (0.36 km^{2}) 2.71%
- Elevation: 118 ft (36 m)

Population (2020)
  - Total: 12,917
  - Density: 2,575/sq mi (994.1/km^{2})
- Time zone: UTC-8 (PST)
  - Summer (DST): UTC-7 (PDT)
- ZIP codes: 91902, 91908
- Area code: 619
- FIPS code: 06-07414
- GNIS feature ID: 1660356

Bonita (Spanish for "Beautiful") is a census-designated place (CDP) in southern San Diego County, California, nestled between the cities of Chula Vista, National City, and San Diego. The population was 12,917 at the 2020 census, up from 12,538 at the 2010 census.

== Geography ==
Bonita is located at 32°39′30″N 117°02′07″W.

According to the United States Census Bureau, Bonita has a total area of 5.1 square miles (13 square kilometers). 5.0 square miles (13 km^{2}) of it is land and 0.1 square miles (0.26 km^{2}) of it (2.71%) is water.

While Bonita is politically designated as an unincorporated community, bounded by the incorporated cities of Chula Vista, San Diego and National City, it is closely associated with the geography of the Lower Sweetwater Valley. Thus considered, Bonita occupies about a five-mile (8 kilometer) stretch of the Sweetwater River, its valley, and surrounding hills on either side, bounded upstream (east) by Sweetwater Reservoir, and downstream (west) effectively by Interstate 805. The community crosses west of I-805—an area less than 160 acres (0.65 square kilometers)—reaching as far south and west as East H Street and Hilltop Drive. Its northern boundary is State Route 54 and its southern extent reaches approximately one-mile (1.6 km) south of the river.

Large portions of modern Bonita consist of housing tracts built throughout the 1960s, 1970s, and 1980s, including:

- Bonita Verde Estates
- Bonita Downs
- Bonita Fairways
- Bonita Glen
- Bonita Highlands
- Bonita Long Canyon
- Bonita Woods
- Bonita Woods Park
- Emerald Ranch
- Lynwood Hills
- Ames Ranch
- Villas de Bonita
- Rancho Robinhood

The Bonita area is populated by coyote, racoon, fox, rabbit, squirrel, bobcat, opossum, and skunk, among other wildlife.

== History ==
Before the arrival of the Spanish, Kumeyaay lived in the area around Sweetwater Valley, and called it Apusquel. After the establishment of Mission San Diego de Alcalá, the valley was used for cattle raising but was not significantly settled. After gaining independence from the Spanish Empire, the valley became part of a land grant awarded to John (Don Juan) Forster. The word Bonita is a feminine word for "pretty" in the Spanish language. It was the name of a ranch owned by Henry Ernest Cooper, Sr. in 1884, and was used by the nearby post office. The ranch itself was used to cultivate lemons, which were first grown in the area beginning in 1871. During the early years lemon industry was thriving, where it became the originator of the Bonnie Brae Lemon variety, named after the first lemon ranch in the community.

In 1888, Sweetwater Dam was built, creating Sweetwater Reservoir and forever changing the geography of the region. Soon after, in 1906, the dam broke as a result of extensive rains which overfilled the reservoir, and the Lower Sweetwater Valley was completely flooded.

Bonita has experienced minor flooding throughout history, generally as a result of high seasonal rains attributed to El Niño. The floods most affect the Central Avenue river crossing, as no bridge has ever been built, unlike the Bonita Road and Willow Road crossings which are bridges, the former of which was rebuilt in the late 1990s.

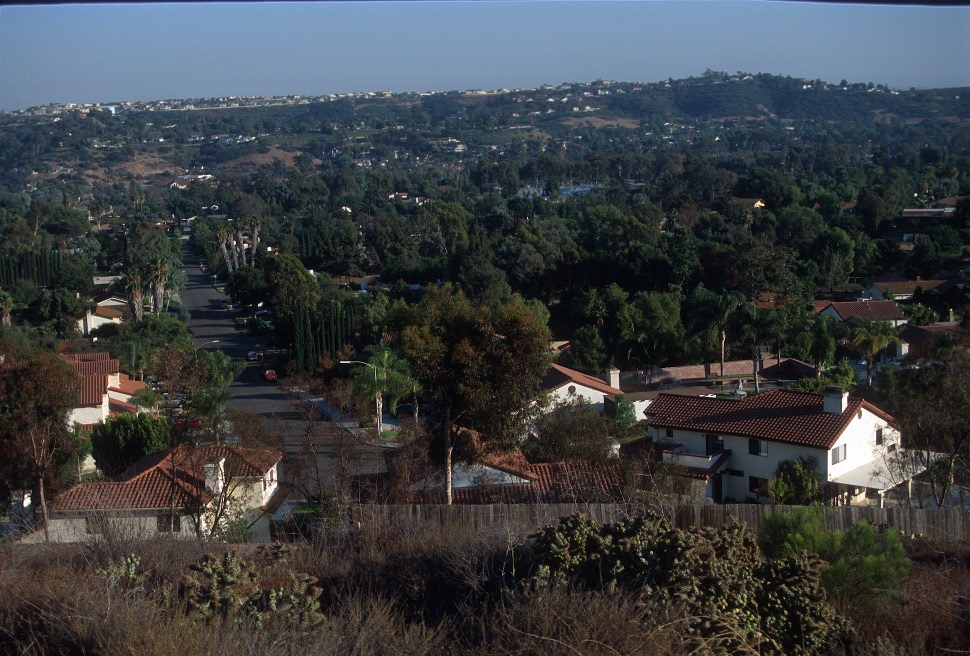
Bonita Valley in 2005

In the 1990s and 2000s, the development of State Route 125 (The South Bay Expressway) became a major issue to Bonita residents, much as Interstate 805 and State Route 54 did during their development. Opponents argued that Bonita's rural nature would be compromised without benefit while proponents argued that the highway would reduce the significant increase in surface-street car traffic the community had seen since the 1980s when the eastern Chula Vista communities surrounding Eastlake were developed. The tollway opened in November 2007 and sought Chapter 11 bankruptcy on March 22, 2010, when the cost of litigation over the construction of the road threatened to overwhelm its ability to operate and pay off its loans. On April 14, 2011, South Bay Expressway LP emerged from bankruptcy, and in a closed session on July 29, 2011, the SANDAG board of directors voted to purchase the lease to operate the State Route 125 toll road for approximately $345 million.

In 2007, Glen Abbey Memorial Park was declared a historic district, having been designed by architects who also worked on Balboa Park, and other landscapes and architectures that are significant to the history of San Diego. It is one of only three historic districts in unincorporated San Diego County.

The Bonita Historical Society, which operates the Bonita Museum & Cultural Center, is the principal repository of historical information for the Lower Sweetwater Valley.

== Climate ==
The climate in Bonita is a combination of the coastal and inland valley climates of San Diego County: warmer (and sunnier during the May Gray and June Gloom periods) than areas directly adjacent to San Diego Bay or the coast, but not as hot as communities in inland valleys such as El Cajon, or even nearby Spring Valley. In summer, Bonita's climate is pleasant.

== Government ==
In the San Diego County Board of Supervisors, Bonita is in District 1.

In the California State Senate, Bonita is in the 18th senatorial district, represented by Democrat Steve Padilla. In the California State Assembly, Bonita is split between the 79th Assembly district, represented by Democrat LaShae Sharp-Collins, and the 80th Assembly district, represented by Democrat David Alvarez.

In the United States House of Representatives, Bonita is in California's 52nd congressional district, represented by Democrat Juan Vargas.

== Educational institutions ==
The following districts serve the local Bonita community:

=== Elementary schools ===
Chula Vista Elementary School District

- Ella B. Allen Elementary School
- Sunnyside Elementary School
- Tiffany Elementary School (Chula Vista)
- Valley Vista Elementary School

=== Middle and high school ===
Sweetwater Union High School District

- Bonita Vista Middle School (Chula Vista)
- Bonita Vista High School (Chula Vista)

=== Community college ===
Southwestern Community College District

- Southwestern College (Chula Vista)

== Parks and recreation ==
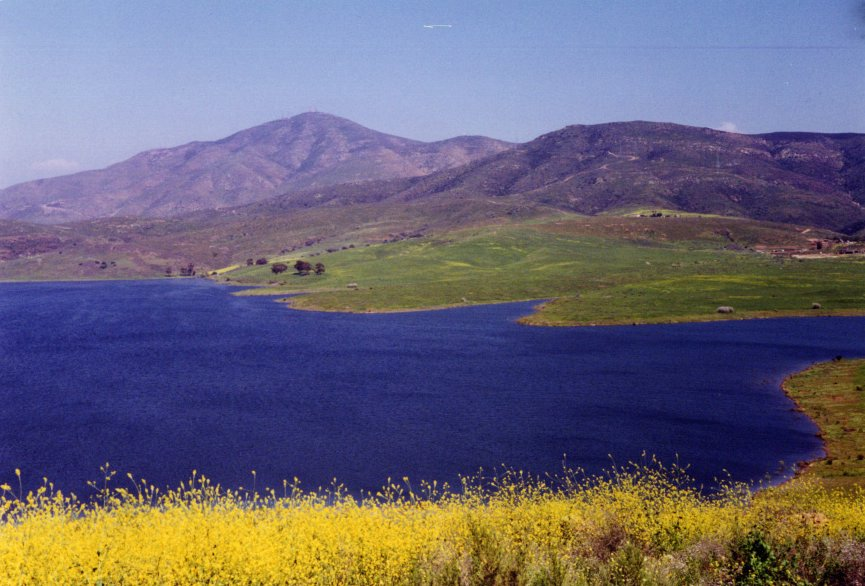
View over Sweetwater Reservoir toward Mt. Miguel

Bonita is considered a rural and equestrian enclave in the middle of suburbia.

To visitors and residents alike, one of the most visible features of Bonita's recreational life is the walking trail that loops the Chula Vista Municipal Golf Course in central Bonita. Hundreds of residents walk, run, and ride this trail every day for pleasure and fitness, and the trail has become a vital component of Bonita's life for many residents. During El Nino years, this golf course and surrounding walking trails have flooded, closing the golf course and preventing many residents from using the walking trails.

In the late 1990s, Sweetwater Regional Park was expanded and significantly improved, extending the walking and equestrian trails to an even greater number, and introducing a camping area at Summit Meadow Road. Now, virtually the entire valley from the reservoir to I-805 formally serves recreational purposes as either park or golf course. Sweetwater County Park, at the intersection of Briarwood Road and Sweetwater Road, is a wildlife preserve with a small pond that supports some fishing.

Equestrianism has long been a part of the Bonita community, and many trails exist throughout the Lower Sweetwater Valley. There are several connections to trails external to Bonita as well. Many residents still keep their own horses and can be seen riding the trails regularly. The Bonita Valley Trails organization monitors and supports the network of trails throughout the valley.

The following parks serve the Bonita community:

- Rohr Park
- Sweetwater Regional Park
- Sweetwater County Park
- Sweetwater Reservoir Riding and Hiking Trail
- Bonita Golf Course
- Chula Vista Municipal Golf Course

== Events ==
Bonitafest is an annual community event, held in early autumn, highlighted by a parade and street fair along Bonita Road which includes crafts, music, entertainment, and food. The Kiwanis Club hosts a Bonitafest Golf Tournament in conjunction with this event. At this time, there is also an annual community play called the Bonitafest Melodrama, co-founded by Max Branscomb in the 1970s. In 2008, Bonita did not have enough funds to pay for traffic police to redirect traffic during the parade, so no parade was held during the Bonitafest.

== Demographics ==
Historical population
Census	Pop.	Note	%±
1980	6,257		—
1990	12,542		100.4%
2000	12,401		−1.1%
2010	12,538		1.1%
2020	12,917		3.0%
U.S. Decennial Census; 1860–1870 1880-1890; 1900 1910 1920; 1930 1940 1950; 1960 1970 1980; 1990 2000 2010; 2020

Bonita was first listed as a census designated place in the 1980 U.S. census.

=== Racial and ethnic composition ===
Bonita CDP, California – Racial and ethnic composition Note: the US Census treats Hispanic/Latino as an ethnic category. This table excludes Latinos from the racial categories and assigns them to a separate category. Hispanics/Latinos may be of any race.
Race / Ethnicity (NH = Non-Hispanic)	Pop 2000	Pop 2010	Pop 2020	% 2000	% 2010	% 2020
White alone (NH)	6,763	5,387	4,239	54.54%	42.97%	32.82%
Black or African American alone (NH)	370	438	413	2.98%	3.49%	3.20%
Native American or Alaska Native alone (NH)	44	54	44	0.35%	0.43%	0.34%
Asian alone (NH)	1,041	1,143	1,257	8.39%	9.12%	9.73%
Native Hawaiian or Pacific Islander alone (NH)	36	70	48	0.29%	0.56%	0.37%
Other race alone (NH)	30	20	73	0.24%	0.16%	0.57%
Mixed race or Multiracial (NH)	338	320	561	2.73%	2.55%	4.34%
Hispanic or Latino (any race)	3,779	5,106	6,282	30.47%	40.72%	48.63%
Total	12,401	12,538	12,917	100.00%	100.00%	100.00%

=== 2020 census ===
As of the 2020 census, Bonita had a population of 12,917. The population density was 2,574.6 inhabitants per square mile (994.1/km^{2}). 100.0% of residents lived in urban areas, while 0.0% lived in rural areas.

The age distribution was 20.2% under the age of 18, 8.5% aged 18 to 24, 23.1% aged 25 to 44, 25.5% aged 45 to 64, and 22.7% who were 65 years of age or older. The median age was 43.5 years. For every 100 females, there were 93.7 males, and for every 100 females age 18 and over, there were 91.7 males age 18 and over.

The census reported that 99.3% of the population lived in households, 0.1% lived in non-institutionalized group quarters, and 0.6% were institutionalized.

There were 4,223 households, out of which 33.2% included children under the age of 18, 59.8% were married-couple households, 4.8% were cohabiting couple households, 22.1% had a female householder with no partner present, and 13.4% had a male householder with no partner present. 14.7% of households were one person, and 8.9% were one person aged 65 or older. The average household size was 3.04. There were 3,391 families (80.3% of all households).

There were 4,391 housing units at an average density of 875.2 units per square mile (337.9 units/km^{2}), of which 4,223 (96.2%) were occupied. Of these, 74.9% were owner-occupied, and 25.1% were occupied by renters. 3.8% of housing units were vacant. The homeowner vacancy rate was 0.8%, and the rental vacancy rate was 3.8%.

=== 2023 estimates ===
In 2023, the US Census Bureau estimated that 21.9% of the population were foreign-born. Of all people aged 5 or older, 59.8% spoke only English at home, 31.5% spoke Spanish, 1.4% spoke other Indo-European languages, 7.2% spoke Asian or Pacific Islander languages, and 0.1% spoke other languages. Of those aged 25 or older, 91.4% were high school graduates and 39.2% had a bachelor's degree.

The median household income was $117,750, and the per capita income was $58,271. About 6.3% of families and 6.5% of the population were below the poverty line.

=== 2008 estimates ===
Bonita is primarily served by three elementary K-6 schools in Chula Vista Elementary School District: Ella B. Allen, Sunnyside, and Valley Vista. As of the 2007–08 school year, 1291 students were enrolled in these schools; their combined demographic makeup was 54.1% Hispanic, 23.5% non-Hispanic White, 5.7% Filipino, 3.8% African American, 1.5% Asian, 1.2% Native American, 0.8% Pacific Islander. 9.4% belonged to multiple races or declined to state the race.

Like many communities in the southwestern United States, Bonita could go through the process of hispanicization. According to 2008 SANDAG estimates, between 2000 and 2008, the number of Whites in Bonita dropped by 8%, and the number of Blacks, by 17%. At the same time, the Hispanic population in the community grew by 26%. Hispanics now constitute the majority of the population of Bonita in all age cohorts under 40; they are far outnumbered (by a factor of 2 or more) in age cohorts over 50.

== Notable people ==
- Andrew Cunanan, American spree killer, lived briefly in Bonita as a child.
- Daniel Camarena, former relief pitcher
