= Rancho de la Nación =

Mexican land grant in California

Coordinates: 32.660°N 117.000°W

- Land Grant
- Interactive map of Rancho de la Nación
- Country: Mexico
- State: California
- County: San Diego
- Established: 1845
- Founder: John Forster

Rancho de la Nación was a 26,632-acre (107.78 km^{2}) Mexican land grant in present-day southern San Diego County, California, given in 1845 by Governor Pío Pico to John (Don Juan) Forster. The grant encompassed present-day National City, Chula Vista, Bonita, Sunnyside and the western Sweetwater Valley.

== History ==
Known as the Rancho del Rey (Ranch of the King) under Spain, this land south of the Presidio of San Diego served since 1795 as a presidial cattle grazing ground. The ranch was renamed Rancho de la Nación (Ranch of the Nation) by the Mexican authorities after its independence. In 1828, a report stated that the Rancho de la Nación, kept two hundred and fifty cattle and twenty-five horses for the Presidio.

In 1845, this six square league land grant was made by Governor Pico to his brother-in-law, John Forster. John Forster (1815–1882), born in England, came to California in 1833. In 1837, he married Ysidora Pico, sister of Pío and Andrés Pico. John Forster was later the owner of the Rancho Santa Margarita y Las Flores, and Rancho Valle de San Felipe.

With the cession of California to the United States following the Mexican-American War, the 1848 Treaty of Guadalupe Hidalgo provided that the land grants would be honored. As required by the Land Act of 1851, a claim for Rancho de la Nación was filed with the Public Land Commission in 1852, and the grant was patented to John Forster in 1866.

In 1854, Forster sold Rancho de la Nación to François Louis Alfred Pioche (1818–1872), a San Francisco financier. Pioche sold the rancho in 1868 to Frank A. Kimball, a native of New Hampshire, and his brothers, Warren and Levi.

== See also ==
- Ranchos of California
- List of Ranchos of California
