= Sweetwater Dam =

Dam in San Diego County, California, US

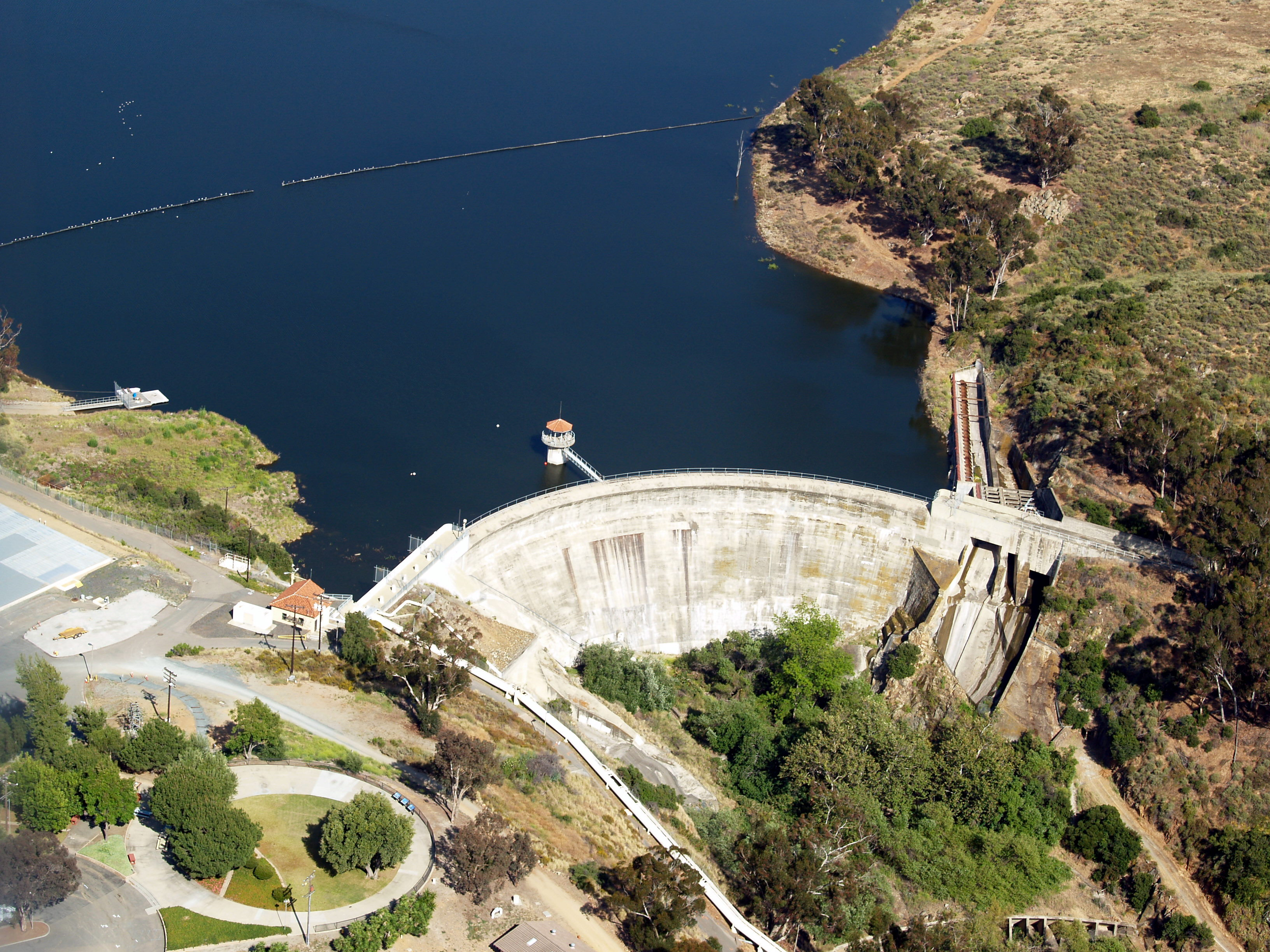
- Sweetwater Dam and reservoir, May 2011

- Location of Sweetwater Dam in California
- Country: United States of America
- Location: San Diego County, California
- Coordinates: 32°41′29″N 117°00′29″W
- Status: In use
- Construction began: 17 November 1886; 139 years ago
- Opening date: 7 April 1888; 138 years ago
- Construction cost: $234,074.11
- Owner: Sweetwater Authority

Dam and spillways
- Type of dam: Concrete gravity-arch
- Impounds: Sweetwater River
- Height: 108 ft (33 m)
- Length: 700 ft (210 m)
- Width (crest): 25 ft (7.6 m)
- Width (base): 46 ft (14 m)
- Spillway type: 7x gate-controlled, service + uncontrolled emergency spillway
- Spillway capacity: 45,000 cu ft/s (1,300 m^{3}/s)

Reservoir
- Creates: Sweetwater Reservoir
- Total capacity: 28,079 acre⋅ft (34,635,000 m^{3})
- Catchment area: 180 mi^{2} (470 km^{2})
- Surface area: 960 acres (390 ha)

Power Station
- Hydraulic head: 90 ft (27 m)
- Installed capacity: None

Sweetwater Dam is a dam across the Sweetwater River in San Diego County, California. It is located approximately 12 miles (19 km) east of San Diego, 9 miles (14 km) and borders Bonita to the southwest and La Presa to the northeast. The 108-foot (33 m)-high masonry arch dam impounds 960-acre (390 ha) Sweetwater Reservoir.

The dam was first constructed in 1888 as part of a system of reservoirs on San Diego County rivers designed to provide water to irrigate crops along the coast and to supply the city of San Diego and its outlying towns. Over the next few decades the dam was raised and retrofitted several times from its original height of 60 feet (18 m). In 1916, a heavy flood caused both abutments of the dam to fail. The rest of the dam did not sustain heavy damage and it remains in use for flood control, water storage and recreation.

== Design ==
Sweetwater Dam is a concrete thick arch-gravity dam, straddling the Sweetwater River to form a reservoir capable of holding 28,079 acre-feet (34,635,000 m^{3}) of water. It is 108 feet (33 m) high and 700 feet (210 m) long, with a thickness of 46 feet (14 m) at the base. It is equipped with an intake tower on the upstream end connected to a high-pressure conduit that cuts through the base of the dam designed to release water from different depths of the reservoir; if water is released from a lower elevation the outflow will be greater. However, due to the low flow of the river, there is typically only a trickle of water below the dam as it impounds all the inflow from upstream. Occasional large floods do hit the area, so the dam is designed to survive overtoppings and also has a pair of seven-gated spillways capable of handling more than 45,000 cubic feet per second (1,300 m^{3}/s).

The dam is operated in conjunction with Loveland Dam and its reservoir approximately 19 miles (31 km) upstream for flood control purposes. The dam serves as a backup water storage facility for the San Diego metropolitan area today in the case of drought, and provides some local municipal water. The reservoir serves for wildlife management and recreation among other uses.

== History ==
=== Planning ===
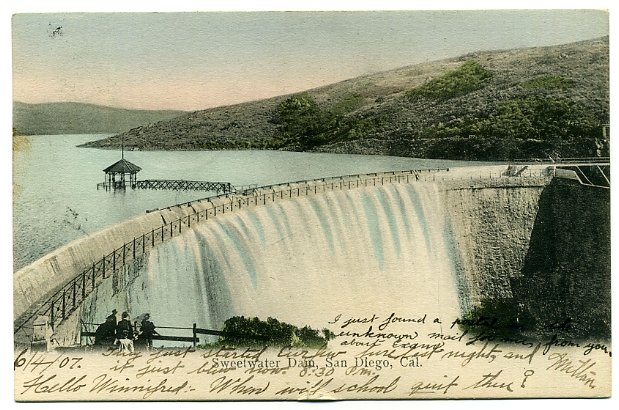
Postcard of the dam circa 1907

Despite having a mild climate and fertile soils, the San Diego area has a semiarid climate, and thus in its rivers most of the flow occurs during the winter months, causing devastating floods. Conversely, in the summer, most of the smaller streams dry up and the larger waterways are reduced to trickles, leading to equally dangerous droughts. The bedrock of the region has notably low permeability, leaving little groundwater available (particularly when compared to nearby Los Angeles and Orange Counties). The Sweetwater River, along with others such as the San Diego River and the San Luis Rey River, was one of the few streams that did flow with abundance year round. As the population of the region grew, however, the river could no longer provide what was needed in the dry season.

One of the area's early settlers, Frank A. Kimball, was the first to suggest the building of a dam on this particular reach of the Sweetwater River in 1869. Here the river after departing a broad valley cuts through a steep and narrow gorge, providing an ideal site for a reservoir. The original blueprints for the dam, drawn by a F. E. Brown, called for a thin-arch dam 50 feet (15 m) high and barely wider on its crest than at its base, capable of holding some 3,700 acre-feet (4,600,000 m^{3}). Groundbreaking of the dam was on November 17, 1886, and a quarry was excavated on the south side of the gorge early the following year to provide masonry rubble for the dam.

=== Construction ===
Following groundbreaking, the dam's foundations were laid by the San Diego Land and Town Company as a large stone-and-cement block 36 feet (11 m) thick and 15 feet (4.6 m) high. During the early stages of construction the Sweetwater River was diverted underneath the foundation structure into a square masonry culvert 30 inches (76 cm) in diameter. The tunnel provided sufficient discharge capacity for the river past the dam site, as 1886–1887 were below average precipitation years. However, in February 1887, the river swelled due to a minor storm and overflowed the foundations for two days. No significant damage was wrought.

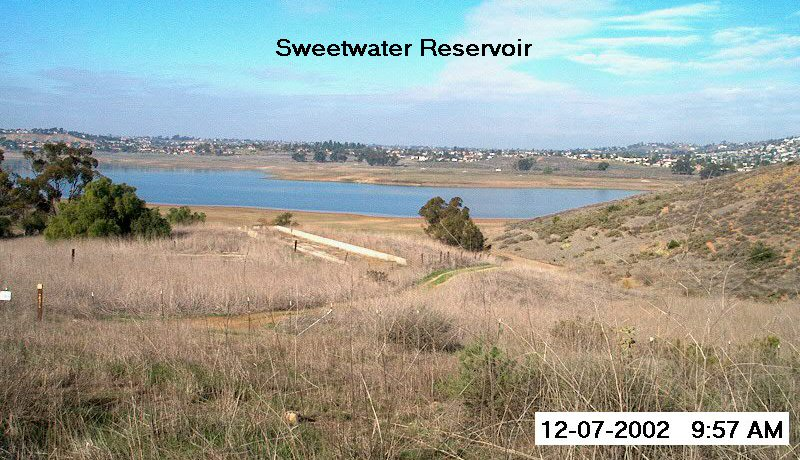
View of Sweetwater Reservoir

As construction progressed, the original thin arch design was considered both unstable and inadequate for the county's growing water needs. Thus the projected height of the dam was increased to 60 feet (18 m) and the base thickness increased by 26 feet (7.9 m). A series of specialized stone steps were constructed on the faces of the dam to provide for future increases in height.

The stone used in the dam's construction was quarried from a large rock outcropping about 800 feet (240 m) downstream on the south bank of the river. There were two types of stone, both metamorphic and one iron-rich, and both were considered excellent for the dam's construction. Sand was excavated from the river bottom for use in cement mixing; this was also declared exceptionally suitable. As the dam rose to a height of 45 feet (14 m), the outlet tunnel at the base was sealed, and the water rose behind the structure to a controlled depth of 35 feet (11 m) for leakage testing purposes. The dam held and no significant seepage was recorded.

Horses and mules were used to transport stone from the quarry to the dam site using carts. At the construction site, four to five derricks ranging in height from 30 to 50 feet (9.1 to 15.2 m) were used to facilitate placement of the stone and cement, bucket by bucket, the latter of which was being made on-site. The dam was topped out on April 7, 1888, to a height of 90 feet (27 m) above its foundations. To the south of the structure was constructed the spillway or "waste weir", consisting of eight overflow channels separated by masonry piers. Controlled by a series of wooden boards, the spillway could handle up to 1,500 cubic feet per second (42 m^{3}/s).

A total of 20,507 cubic yards (15,679 m^{3}) of material were used in the construction of the dam, including 17,562 barrels of cement. The total cost came to $234,074.11, including preliminary investigations and purchase of the land to be flooded by the reservoir. The dedication ceremony was on April 19, and over three thousand people came to watch. At that time, the dam was the highest masonry arch dam in the United States and was considered an engineering marvel and tourist attraction.

=== 1911 expansion ===
In the winter of 1895, heavy rains caused the Sweetwater River to rise to record levels, and the dam's outlets and spillways were unable to handle the excess inflow of water. For more than 40 hours during the peak of the storm, the reservoir overtopped the dam by nearly two feet, spilling over in a massive waterfall. The floods caused severe damage to the abutments of the dam and eroded the riverbed below, but the dam survived. In response to the danger of future floods, work began in 1910 to raise the dam to a height of 110 feet (34 m). To do this, a 20-foot (6.1 m)-tall vertical masonry parapet was added to the top of the dam, the spillways were reconstructed, and the intake tower was raised. This was finished in 1911, and gave the reservoir an additional capacity of about 4,000 acre-feet (4,900,000 m^{3}).

== 1916 failure ==
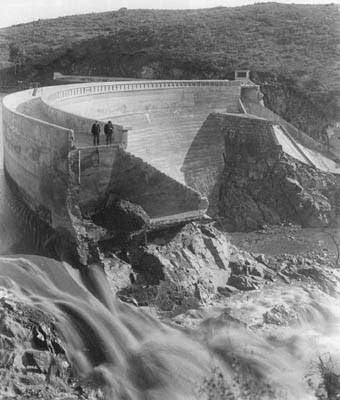
The Sweetwater Dam collapse of 1916

In the winter of 1915, southern California was experiencing a devastating drought that had drained area reservoirs to record low levels over more than three consecutive years, causing massive agricultural and ranching losses. Residents of San Diego County were so desperate that the city of San Diego hired a man called Charles Hatfield, known as "the Rainmaker". The city promised Hatfield $10,000 if he could make it rain significantly by the end of the year. Hatfield's venture was apparently a success, but it is not known what actually caused the massive floods that tore through the county beginning December 9, the day after he started his ill-fated scheme.

More than thirty-nine inches (990 mm) of rain fell during the following month, and storms continued deluging the county well into early 1916. The area's rivers and streams rose to their highest recorded levels in years. More than 200 bridges were washed out, entire communities were swept away, levees collapsed, and valleys were inundated. All the bridges along the San Diego, Sweetwater and Otay rivers were washed out except for a rail bridge that was left standing alone with its ends missing. The earthen Otay Dam, several miles southeast of the Sweetwater on the Otay River, burst on January 27 sending a wall of water into southern Chula Vista. Flooding deposited so much sediment that the southern end of San Diego Bay was filled with it – much of the sand remains today in the form of shoals that must be periodically dredged to accommodate boat traffic.

The Sweetwater River rose until it reached a peak flow of 45,500 cubic feet per second (1,290 m^{3}/s) on January 30, 1916, and though the dam had been increased in height and its spillway capacity enlarged, this did little to prevent it from overflowing. The reservoir overtopped the dam crest by an estimated 3.5 feet (1.1 m) in an event similar to, but far larger than 1895. The river breached the north abutment of the dam, then soon after the south end just left of the spillway went with it. Like in 1895, the main structure of the dam was not heavily damaged but the river eroded enough material around the structure to allow two-thirds of the reservoir to drain. The failure of the dam caused extensive damage downstream, including the destruction of over 15,000 ft (4,572 m) of Sweetwater Water Co. pipeline, all railway track and electric utility lines. The dam was subsequently rebuilt and an additional spillway added to pass future floods.

== Later events ==
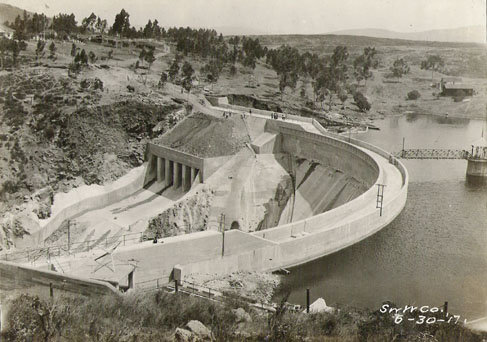
The dam in 1917 one year after floods that destroyed both abutments, showing new spillway

In 1939 and 1940, the dam received a major overhaul in which the 1911 parapet was lowered by two feet and built into an emergency spillway as the two existing spillways were considered insufficient to handle large floods. The dam then came under the ownership of the Sweetwater Authority, which still runs the dam today. In the late 20th century, a new concrete coating was applied to the dam in an attempt to stop leakage. However, the dam's spillways were still considered inadequate to handle more than 20 percent of a "probable maximum flood". On April 7, 2006, Sweetwater Dam was recognized as a Historic Civil Engineering Landmark by the American Society of Civil Engineers.

== See also ==
- List of dams and reservoirs in California

== Works cited ==
- American Society of Civil Engineers (1888). Transactions of the American Society of Civil Engineers. Vol. 19. ASCE Publications.
- Cerveny, Randy (2005). Freaks of the storm: from flying cows to stealing thunder, the world's strangest true weather stories. Basic Books. ISBN 1-56025-801-2.
- Wilson, Herbert Michael (1903). Irrigation engineering. J. Wiley & Sons.
