= Juaquapin Creek =

Stream in San Diego County, California, U.S.

Coordinates: 32.9135°N 116.5696°W

Juaquapin Creek is a stream in San Diego County, California, in the United States.

Juaquapin is likely derived from a Native American word meaning "warm water".

== See also ==
- List of rivers of California
