= Sweetwater Reservoir =

Artificial lake in San Diego County, California, United States

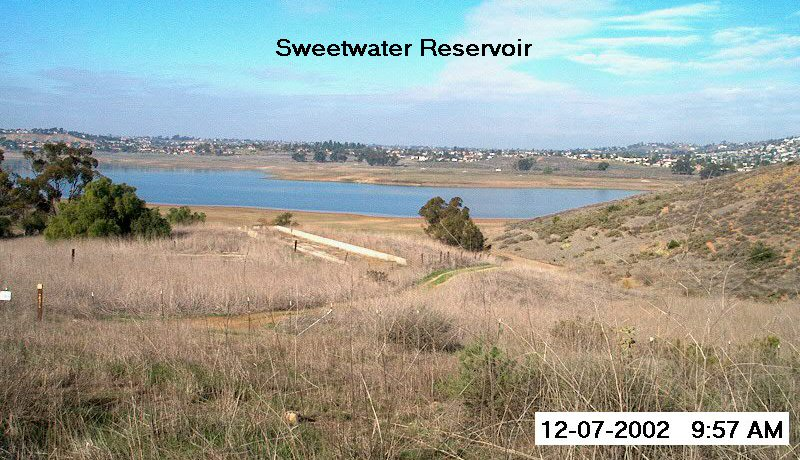

- Location within California Location within the United States
- Interactive map of Sweetwater Reservoir
- Location: San Diego County, California
- Coordinates: 32°41′49″N 116°59′14″W
- Type: Reservoir
- Primary inflows: Sweetwater River
- Primary outflows: Sweetwater River
- Catchment area: 182 square miles (470 km^{2})
- Basin countries: United States
- Managing agency: Sweetwater Authority
- Built: April 7, 1888
- Max. length: 2 miles (3.2 km)
- Max. width: 0.75 miles (1.21 km)
- Surface area: 936 acres (379 ha)
- Max. depth: 108 feet (33 m)
- Water volume: 27,689 acre-feet (34,154,000 m^{3})
- Frozen: Never
- Islands: none
- Settlements: La Presa
- Website: www.sweetwater.org/258/Sweetwater-Reservoir

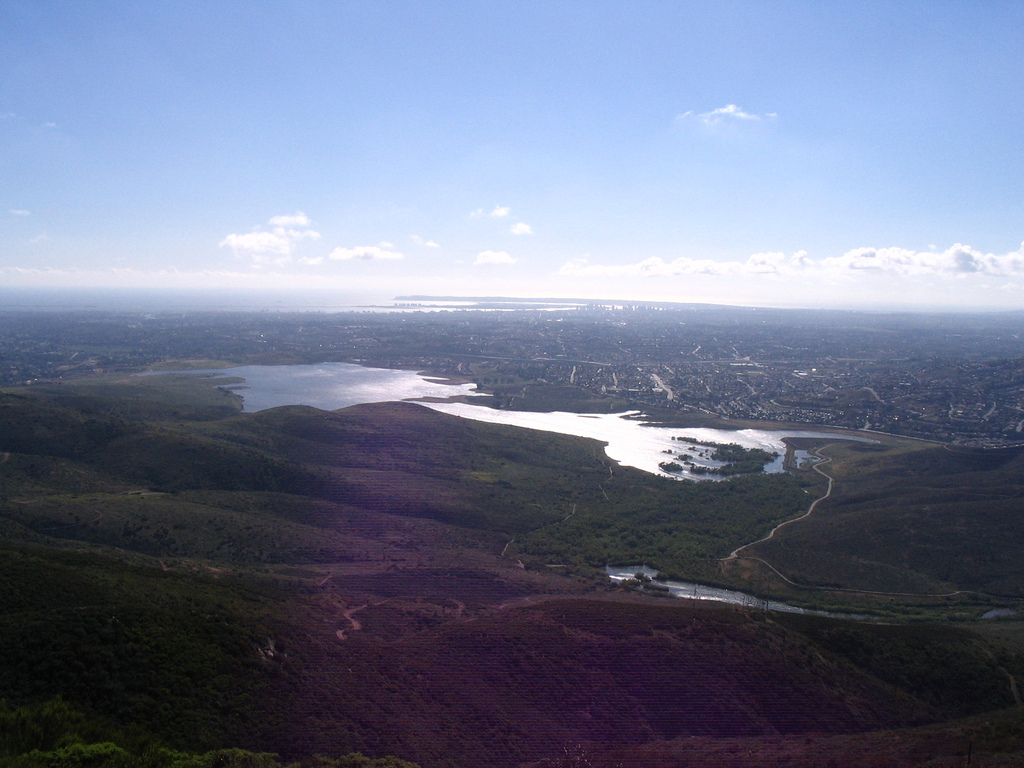
Sweetwater Reservoir as seen from San Miguel Mountain in 2006

Sweetwater Reservoir is a 960-acre (390 ha) artificial lake in San Diego County, California, formed by Sweetwater Dam on the Sweetwater River. Construction of the dam was completed in 1888.

== Environment ==
The area surrounding the reservoir is home to several species, including least Bell's vireo and the California gnatcatcher. It lies near the census-designated places of Bonita, La Presa and Spring Valley. The drainage basin it forms along with Loveland Reservoir covers 230 square miles (600 km^{2}).

== See also ==
- List of dams and reservoirs in California
- List of lakes in California
