= Rice Canyon =

Coordinates: 32°38′36.20″N 117°01′41.08″W

Aerial photography of Rice Canyon (top) and the neighboring Snake Trail (bottom) in 2024 from the National Agriculture Imagery Program

Rice Canyon is a canyon in Chula Vista, California. The canyon is located west of Kumeyaay Park in the Rancho del Rey neighborhood and is the site of the Rice Canyon Open Space Preserve.

== History ==
Rice Canyon is part of Open Space District 20, established by the Chula Vista City Council in 1989 to support the maintenance of open spaces in the Rancho del Rey housing development. The preserved area covers 47.9 acres.

== Trails ==
A side trail in the Rice Canyon Open Space Preserve

Rice Canyon's main trail is a 2.7 mile out-and-back trail with a demonstration garden featuring native plants at the trailhead. Writing for the San Diego Union-Tribune, hiking columnist Maura Fox described it as an easy hike but noted that, while it is "wide and well-maintained," the trail lacks shade. A second segment, nicknamed the Candy Cane, is 0.4 miles long and separated from the main trail by the intersection of Rancho del Rey Parkway and Del Rey Boulevard.

== Ecology ==
A California gnatcatcher photographed through the brush beside the trail in Rice Canyon

Rice Canyon is a coastal sage scrub community surrounded by suburban residences. Native plant species in the canyon include coast barrel cacti, coast chollas, San Diego ragweed and lemonade berry shrubs. An intermittent stream in the base of the canyon supports willow trees. The canyon provides a habitat for California gnatcatchers and cactus wrens.

== Management ==
In 2017, over 80 invasive Mexican fan palms were cut down and removed from the site by helicopter.

State and local authorities consider Rice Canyon a fire hazard due to the dense accumulation of dead brush in close proximity to homes. In July 2018, a brushfire started in the canyon and burned a half-acre of brush before being extinguished within an hour. The Chula Vista Fire Department's Hazardous Fuels Reduction Program handcrew cleared brush from the canyon in the summer of 2026 as a proactive wildfire prevention measure.
