= Apolinaria Lorenzana =

- Born: 1793; Mexico City, Mexico
- Died: 1884 (aged 90–91); Santa Barbara, California
- Other names: Apolinaria la Cuna; Apolinaria la Beata; Doña Apolinaria Lorenzana
- Occupations: Teacher, nurse, matron at Alta California missions

Apolinaria Lorenzana (1793–1884) was a Californio woman of the 19th century who was brought to the western part of the Mexican Cession in the area of present-day California. She lived at missions in San Diego, Santa Barbara, and San Juan Capistrano, where she was a teacher, matron, religious leader, and nurse. During the 1840s, many residents of those areas died or moved away, and she was given ranch land owned by the missions, but eventually lost the after American people moved into the area. She was one of several girls sent from an orphanage to become a wife of presidio soldiers, but she remained single throughout her life.

== Early life ==
Lorenzana was born in Mexico City in 1793. (Note: Lorenzana was said in her obituary to be 112 years old when she died in 1884. That would mean she would have been born in 1872. At least two sources state that she was born in 1793 or was seven years old in 1800.) Like other foundling babies, Apolinaria received the surname of the archbishop of Mexico. She was living in an orphanage in Mexico City in 1797. She learned her letters and how to read in the orphanage.

In 1800, she was one of 19 girls and boys that traveled to San Blas on the Pacific Coast, and then sailed on the Rey la Concepción, a frigate, to Monterey in Alta California. Once they arrived, they were "distributed like puppies" to families. The ten girls were intended to become wives for unmarried men in California. Lorenzana was the only girl that did not marry. (Note: Presido soldiers who had come to California sought wives. Diego de Borica, the colonial governor, had tried to recruit women to come to California without luck. So, he had foundling children of various ages sent to California to be raised for matrimony. After that, the focus of the colonial government was to draw families to the area. In 1834, the Híjar-Padrés colony brought 118 men, women, and children, about 42 families, to Alta California. After that, white people moved to California from the United States.) She had received a proposal of marriage but preferred to remain single.

Her mother came with her on the trip from Mexico to Alta California. She married a soldier and moved with him to San Blas. Lorenzana did not see her mother again.

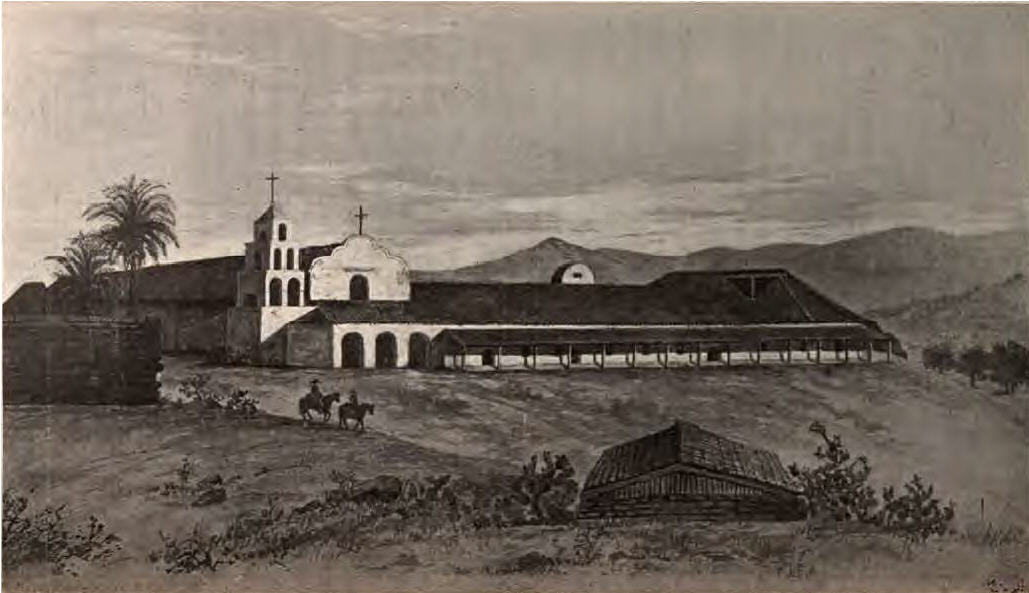
Mission San Diego de Alcalá, 1848

Lorenzana lived with the family of Don Raymundo Carrillo and Tomasa Lugo in Santa Barbara, where Carillo was commander of Presidio of Santa Barbara. She moved with the family when Carrillo became the Presidio of San Diego commander. Lorenzana was twelve or thirteen years of age at that time. She remained with the Carrillos for a few more years. Lorenzana taught herself to write by copying what she saw onto discarded scraps of paper or cigarette paper she could find to practice.

Lorenzana lived at some point with Doña Tomasa Lugo and then with Sergant Mercado and Doña Josefa Sal in San Diego. (Note: In another account, Sal was a widow when Lorenzana moved in with her.) Lorenzana taught girls about the Catholic Church. Sal opened up a school for girls. Lorenzana suffered from an illness that left her with paralysis in her left hand. She went to the Mission in San Diego, where she recuperated and trained to serve the mission.

== Missions ==
Lorenzana acquired the nickname la beata (the pious one or sister of charity) and had many skills to serve the Catholic missions. She worked as a cook, teacher, matron, nurse, and keeper of the keys. She was respected for her care for the community of Native American, Hispanic, and American people. She was particularly well-known as a teacher and made money selling by embroidered and sewn fabric.

From 1821 to 1830, Lorenzana was at Mission San Luis Rey de Francia. She worked at the mission there in the 1830s. She was a housekeeper, nurse, and sewing teacher. In the 1830s, there was violence that erupted between Native Americans and Californios. In 1836, Rancho Jamul near San Diego was attacked by Native Americans, followed by retaliation by the Californios.

At Mission San Diego de Alcalá, she helped Father Vicente. She was responsible for ensuring the chastity of girls who lived at the mission. She locked them in the mission at night and released them in the morning. Lorenzana was godmother to many children, including three children of Eulalia Perez, the housekeeper at Mission San Gabriel. (Note: Lorenzana claimed that she was the godmother of 100 to 200 children.) In addition to her work as a teacher, religious leader, and nurse, she supervised the purchase of food from incoming ships and became the llavera, head housekeeper at the mission. Lorenzana found that the missionaries were sometimes too harsh when punishing or indoctrinating indigenous people.

Even though the California missions enjoyed several decades of prosperity, the missionaries ultimately destroyed the California Indians. They subjected the natives to unaccustomed labor, unsanitary living conditions, exposure to disease, and a disruption of family ties, social relationships, and cultural values. This resulted in the physical and moral decline of the Aboriginal population.

— Stephen Van Wormer

Lorenzana moved to Santa Barbara when the Mission Santa Barbara foundation was being laid. She had been blind for many years and lived off of charity. She dictated information for her memoir. She said,

I had the satisfaction of being well-loved by young and old and rich and poor. Maybe it was because I was good-natured and would do whatever I could to help people.

== Ranchos ==
The mission owned three ranchos Rancho Cañada de los Coches, Capistrano de las Secuás, and Rancho Jamacha. The mission at San Diego was secularized following the deaths and movement of Indigenous people out of the area due to disease, harsh working conditions, and cultural changes. There were few people living in the Jamacha Valley by the middle of the 19th century.

=== Rancho Jamacha ===
Lorenzana received a grant for Rancho Jamacha from San Diego missionaries in 1840. It was located in the Jamacha valley and alongside the Sweetwater River. She primarily lived and worked at the mission for the few people that were there and sometimes visited her farm and ranch that a foreman managed. She grew corn and wheat on the east side of the river. A ranch house and corral that she had built in the valley.

Juan Forster managed Lorenzana's ranches. She was in San Juan Capistrano when United States troops, led by General Stephen Watts Kearny and Commadoree Robert F. Stockton, passed through the San Diego area and her ranches on their way to Los Angeles (about in December 1846). Captain John B. Magruder used her ranch to care for his troop's horses, but never compensated her. It was a beginning of a trend for the army to use her ranch land. Ranch Jamacha was taken over by Americans. According to Hubert Howe Bancroft, an American historian, Lorenzana lost the ranch through "some legal hocus-pocus that the old woman never understood." At the same time, many Mexican rancheros lost their land due to the Land Act of 1851.

=== Other ranchos ===
She received a grant to a small tract called Rancho de los Coches by Governor Manuel Micheltorena in 1843. (Note: It was also known as Buenos Esperanza de los Coches and Cañada de los Coches.) Lorenzana purchased the Capistrano de Sucuá. She eventually lost all three ranches.

== Death ==
Lorenzana died on April 11, 1884, in Santa Barbara and was buried at the Catholic Church.

== Popular culture ==
- "Spanish Mission System" in Foreigners in Their Own Land (1565-1880). Lorenzana tells of her life at the San Diego Mission.
