= La Presa, California =

La Presa
- census-designated place
- Interactive map of La Presa
- Location within San Diego County Location within California Location within the United States
- Coordinates: 32°42′43″N 117°0′14″W
- Country: United States
- State: California
- County: San Diego

Area
  - Total: 6.017 sq mi (15.585 km^{2})
  - Land: 5.496 sq mi (14.234 km^{2})
  - Water: 0.522 sq mi (1.351 km^{2}) 8.67%
- Elevation: 351 ft (107 m)

Population (2020)
  - Total: 35,033
  - Density: 6,374.5/sq mi (2,461.2/km^{2})
- Time zone: UTC-8 (PST)
  - Summer (DST): UTC-7 (PDT)
- ZIP code: 91977
- Area code: 619
- FIPS code: 06-40326
- GNIS feature ID: 0244447

La Presa (Spanish for "The Dam") is a census-designated place (CDP) in the East County region of San Diego County, California, United States. The population was 35,033 at the 2020 census, up from 34,169 at the 2010 census.

La Presa belonged to the neighboring Spring Valley CDP from its inception in 1970 through 1990. It is still considered part of Spring Valley in informal usage and addresses in the CDP continue to use the name Spring Valley. It was named after Sweetwater Dam.

La Presa is served by a 91977 ZIP Code, which is considered Spring Valley according to the USPS.

== Geography ==
La Presa is located at 32°42′43″N 117°0′14″W (32.712057, -117.003862). According to the United States Census Bureau, the CDP has a total area of 6.0 square miles (16 km^{2}). 5.5 square miles (14 km^{2}) of it is land and 0.5 square miles (1.3 km^{2}) of it (8.67%) is water.

== Demographics ==
Historical population
Census	Pop.	Note	%±
2000	32,721		—
2010	34,169		4.4%
2020	35,033		2.5%
U.S. Decennial Census; 1860–1870 1880-1890; 1900 1910 1920; 1930 1940 1950; 1960 1970 1980; 1990 2000 2010; 2020

La Presa first appeared as a census designated place in the 2000 U.S. census.

=== Racial and ethnic composition ===
La Presa CDP, California – Racial and ethnic composition Note: the US Census treats Hispanic/Latino as an ethnic category. This table excludes Latinos from the racial categories and assigns them to a separate category. Hispanics/Latinos may be of any race.
Race / Ethnicity (NH = Non-Hispanic)	Pop 2000	Pop 2010	Pop 2020	% 2000	% 2010	% 2020
White alone (NH)	12,238	8,950	7,514	37.40%	26.19%	21.45%
Black or African American alone (NH)	4,563	4,146	3,791	13.95%	12.13%	10.82%
Native American or Alaska Native alone (NH)	162	94	120	0.50%	0.28%	0.34%
Asian alone (NH)	3,122	3,064	3,457	9.54%	8.97%	9.87%
Native Hawaiian or Pacific Islander alone (NH)	327	362	212	1.00%	1.06%	0.61%
Other race alone (NH)	92	48	203	0.28%	0.14%	0.58%
Mixed race or Multiracial (NH)	1,404	1,355	1,737	4.29%	3.97%	4.96%
Hispanic or Latino (any race)	10,813	16,150	17,999	33.05%	47.27%	51.38%
Total	32,721	34,169	35,033	100.00%	100.00%	100.00%

=== 2020 census ===
As of the 2020 census, La Presa had a population of 35,033. The population density was 6,373.1 inhabitants per square mile (2,460.7/km^{2}). 100.0% of residents lived in urban areas and 0.0% lived in rural areas.

Racial composition as of the 2020 census
Race	Number	Percent
White	10,203	29.1%
Black or African American	4,083	11.7%
American Indian and Alaska Native	618	1.8%
Asian	3,635	10.4%
Native Hawaiian and Other Pacific Islander	253	0.7%
Some other race	9,236	26.4%
Two or more races	7,005	20.0%

The census reported that 99.3% of residents lived in households, 0.5% lived in non-institutionalized group quarters, and 0.2% were institutionalized.

There were 10,486 households; 40.7% had children under the age of 18, 50.7% were married-couple households, 6.8% were cohabiting couple households, 26.5% had a female householder with no spouse or partner present, and 16.0% had a male householder with no spouse or partner present. About 15.5% of households were made up of individuals and 7.5% had someone living alone who was 65 or older. The average household size was 3.32. There were 8,230 families (78.5% of all households).

24.1% of residents were under the age of 18, 9.7% were aged 18 to 24, 27.9% were aged 25 to 44, 24.3% were aged 45 to 64, and 14.0% were 65 years of age or older. The median age was 36.2 years. For every 100 females, there were 96.0 males, and for every 100 females age 18 and over, there were 93.3 males.

There were 10,734 housing units at an average density of 1,952.7 per square mile (753.9/km^{2}), of which 10,486 (97.7%) were occupied. The homeowner vacancy rate was 0.7% and the rental vacancy rate was 2.3%; 63.6% of occupied units were owner-occupied and 36.4% were renter-occupied.

=== 2023 American Community Survey ===
In 2023, the US Census Bureau estimated that the median household income was $88,479, and the per capita income was $36,663. About 6.6% of families and 9.9% of the population were below the poverty line.

=== 2010 census ===
At the 2010 census La Presa had a population of 34,169. The population density was 5,678.3 inhabitants per square mile (2,192.4/km^{2}). The racial makeup of La Presa was 9,045 (24.0%) White, 4,428 (13.0%) African American, 282 (0.8%) Native American, 3,958 (10.5%) Asian, 410 (1.2%) Pacific Islander, 8,238 (24.1%) from other races, and 2,535 (7.4%) from two or more races. Hispanic or Latino of any race were 19,279 persons (51.1%).

The census reported that 33,924 people (99.3% of the population) lived in households, 154 (0.5%) lived in non-institutionalized group quarters, and 91 (0.3%) were institutionalized.

There were 10,178 households, 4,708 (46.3%) had children under the age of 18 living in them, 5,270 (51.8%) were opposite-sex married couples living together, 1,885 (18.5%) had a female householder with no husband present, 784 (7.7%) had a male householder with no wife present. There were 640 (6.3%) unmarried opposite-sex partnerships, and 85 (0.8%) same-sex married couples or partnerships. 1,625 households (16.0%) were one person and 705 (6.9%) had someone living alone who was 65 or older. The average household size was 3.33. There were 7,939 families (78.0% of households); the average family size was 3.69.

The age distribution was 9,584 people (28.0%) under the age of 18, 3,692 people (10.8%) aged 18 to 24, 9,287 people (27.2%) aged 25 to 44, 8,015 people (23.5%) aged 45 to 64, and 3,591 people (10.5%) who were 65 or older. The median age was 32.7 years. For every 100 females, there were 95.9 males. For every 100 females age 18 and over, there were 92.1 males.

There were 10,711 housing units at an average density of 1,780.0 per square mile, of the occupied units 6,338 (62.3%) were owner-occupied and 3,840 (37.7%) were rented. The homeowner vacancy rate was 2.2%; the rental vacancy rate was 5.7%. 20,565 people (60.2% of the population) lived in owner-occupied housing units and 13,359 people (39.1%) lived in rental housing units.

== Government ==
In the California State Legislature, La Presa is in the 39th senatorial district, represented by Democrat Akilah Weber Pierson, and in the 79th Assembly district, represented by Democrat LaShae Sharp-Collins.

In the United States House of Representatives, La Presa is in California's 51st congressional district, represented by Democrat Sara Jacobs.
