= Del Dios, California =

- Unincorporated community Census designated place
- Location within California
- Coordinates: 33°4′32.46″N 117°7′8.53″W
- Country: United States
- State: California
- County: San Diego

Area
  - Total: 0.41 sq mi (1.1 km^{2})
  - Land: 0.41 sq mi (1.1 km^{2})
  - Water: 0 sq mi (0 km^{2})
- Elevation: 361 ft (110 m)

Population (2020)
  - Total: 396
- Time zone: UTC-8 (PST)
  - Summer (DST): UTC-7 (PDT)
- GNIS feature ID: 2813414

Del Dios is an unincorporated community and census-designated place (CDP) in San Diego County, California, United States. Per the 2020 census, the population was 396.

== Demographics ==
Historical population
Census	Pop.	Note	%±
2020	396		—
U.S. Decennial Census; 2020

Del Dios first appeared as a census-designated place in the 2020 census.

=== 2020 Census ===
Del Dios, California – Racial and ethnic composition Note: the US Census treats Hispanic/Latino as an ethnic category. This table excludes Latinos from the racial categories and assigns them to a separate category. Hispanics/Latinos may be of any race.
Race / Ethnicity (NH = Non-Hispanic)	Pop 2020	% 2020
White alone (NH)	324	81.82%
Black or African American alone (NH)	7	1.77%
Native American or Alaska Native alone (NH)	2	0.51%
Asian alone (NH)	7	1.77%
Native Hawaiian or Pacific Islander alone (NH)	0	0.00%
Other race alone (NH)	6	1.52%
Mixed race or Multiracial (NH)	8	2.02%
Hispanic or Latino (any race)	42	10.61%
Total	396	100.00%

== Education ==
The CDP is in Escondido Union Elementary School District and Escondido Union High School District.
