= San Diego County, California =

County in California, United States

San Diego County
- County
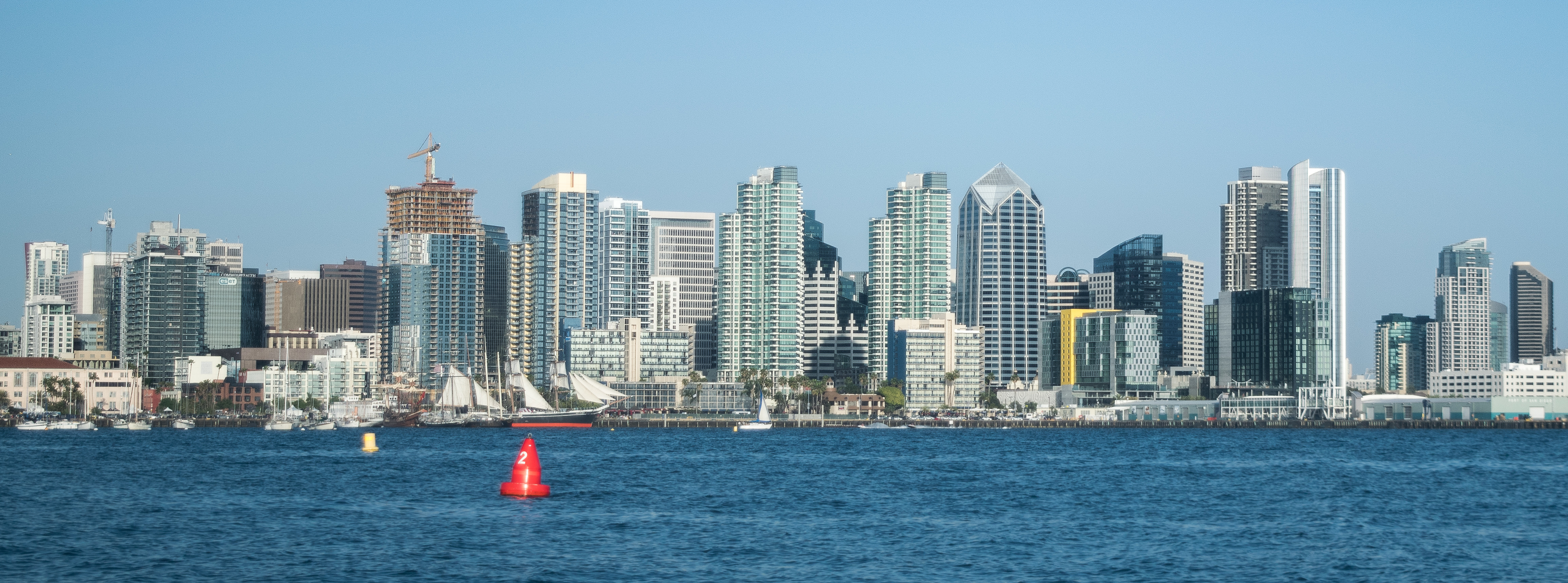
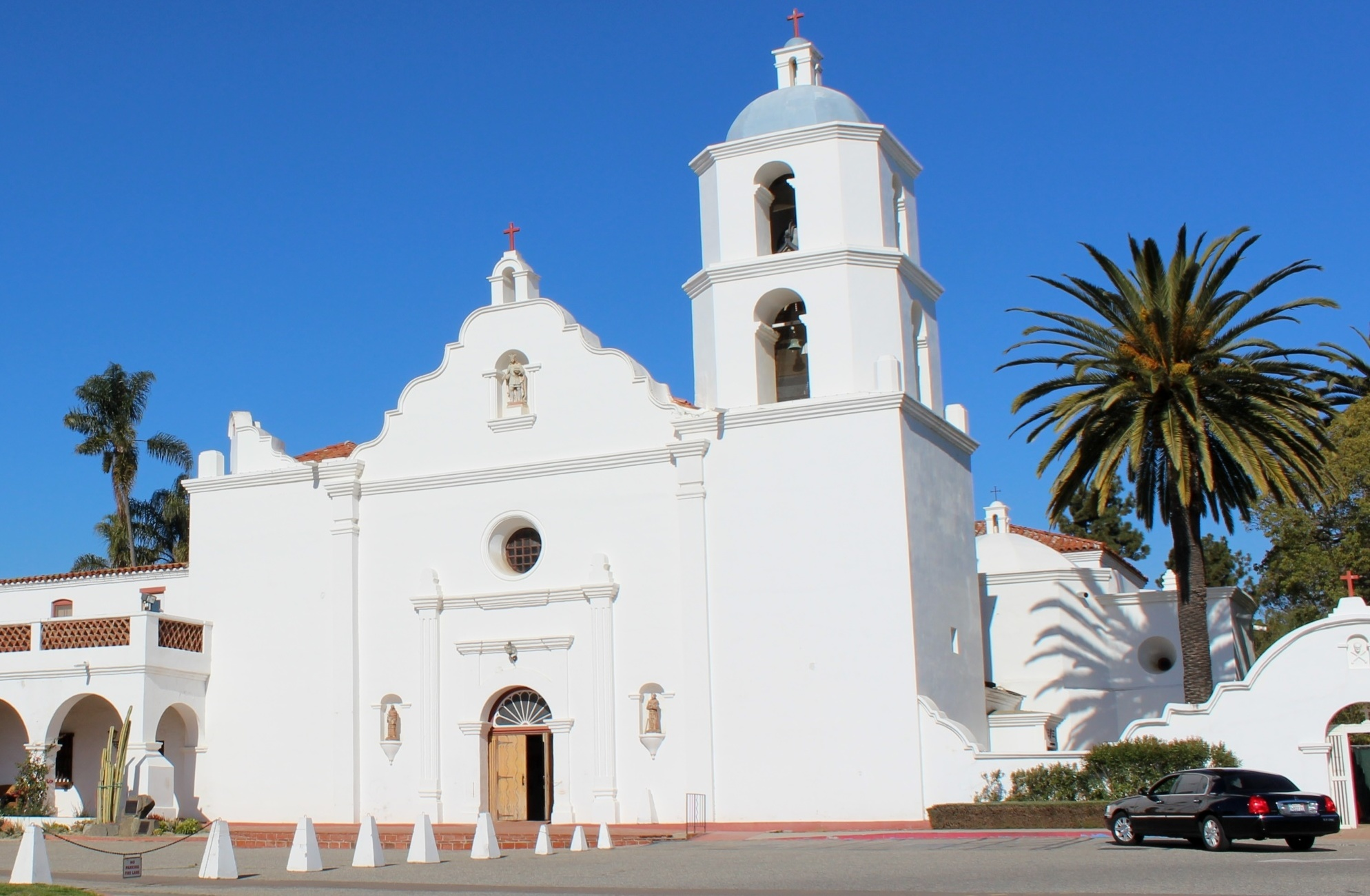
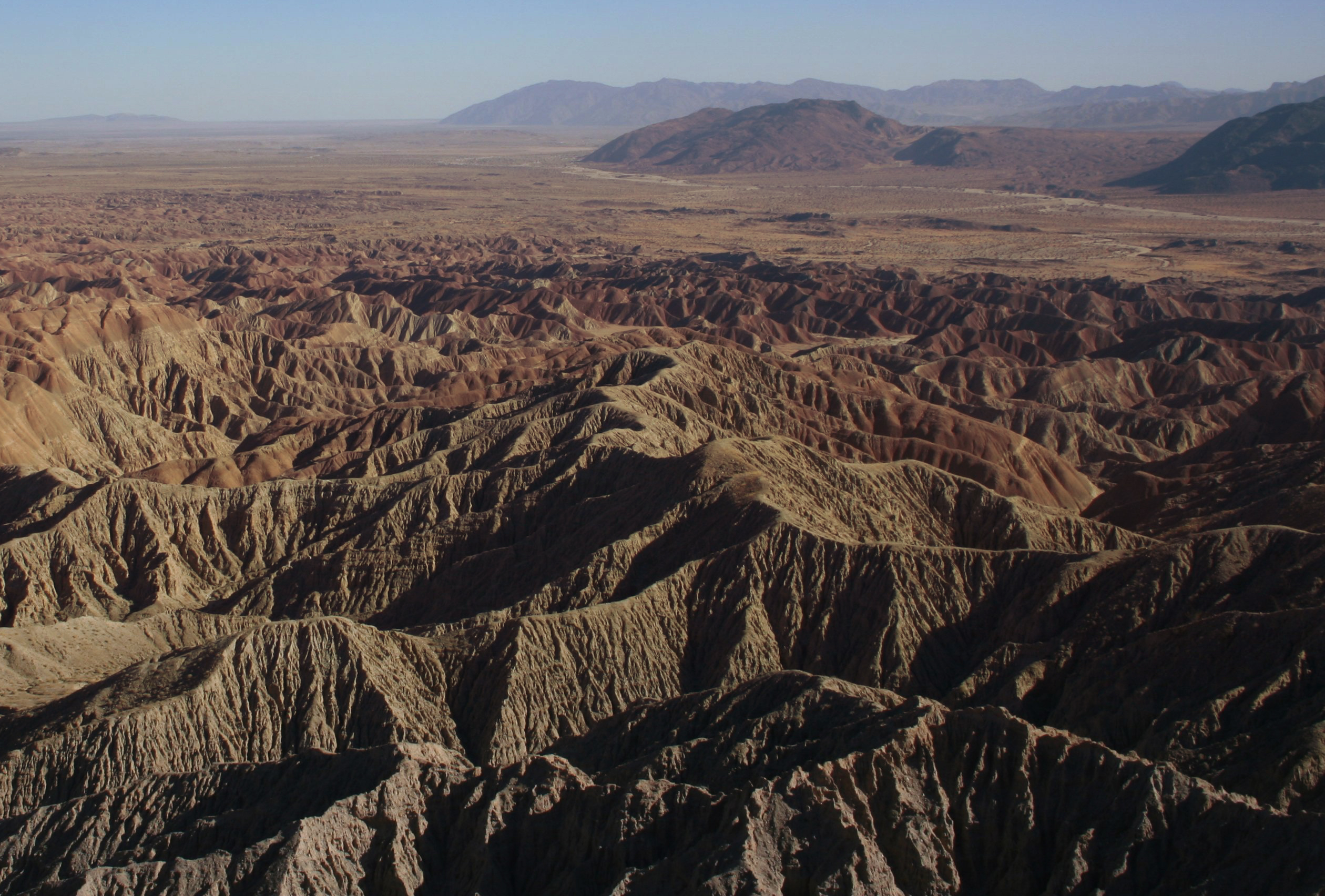
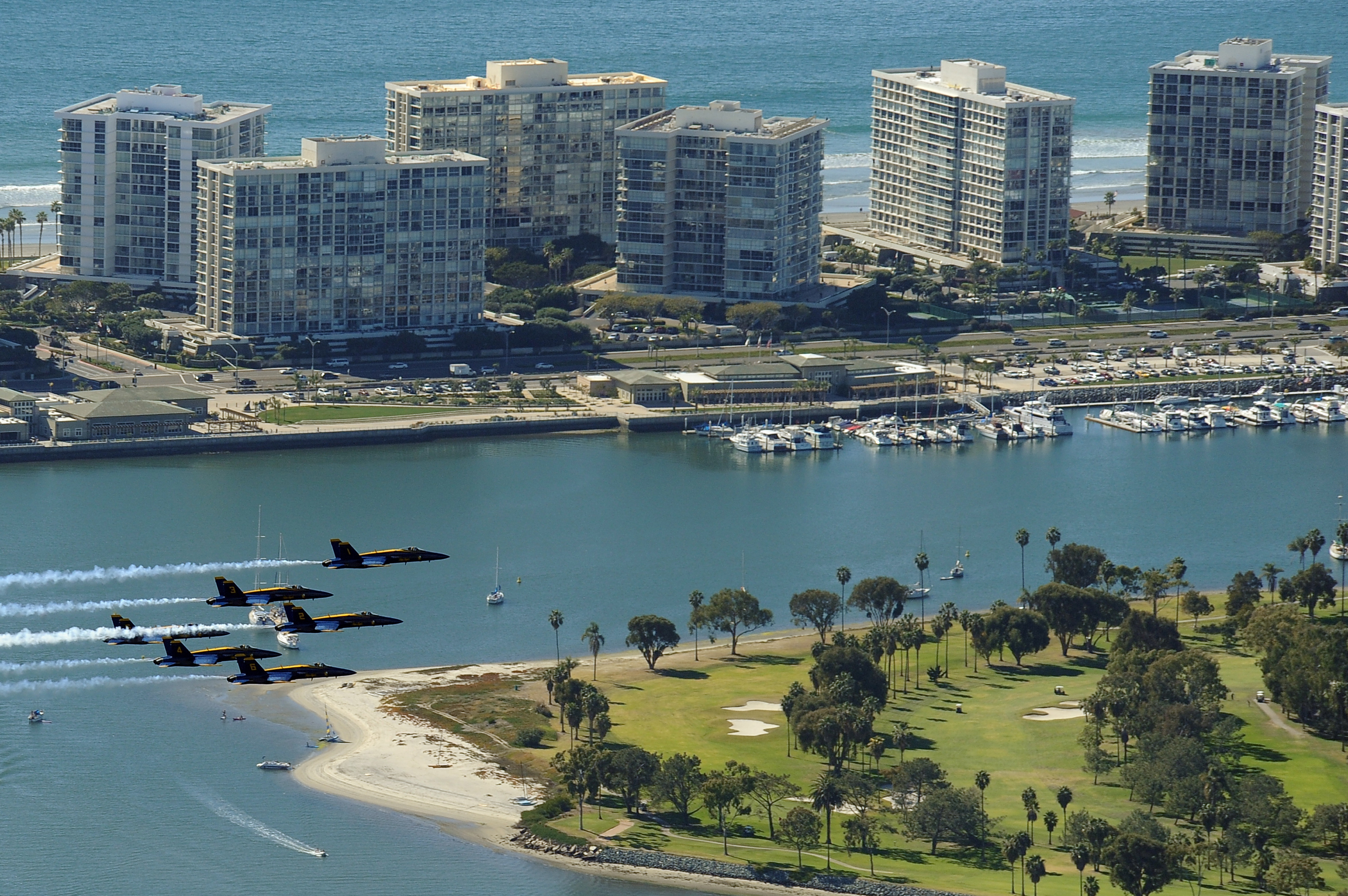
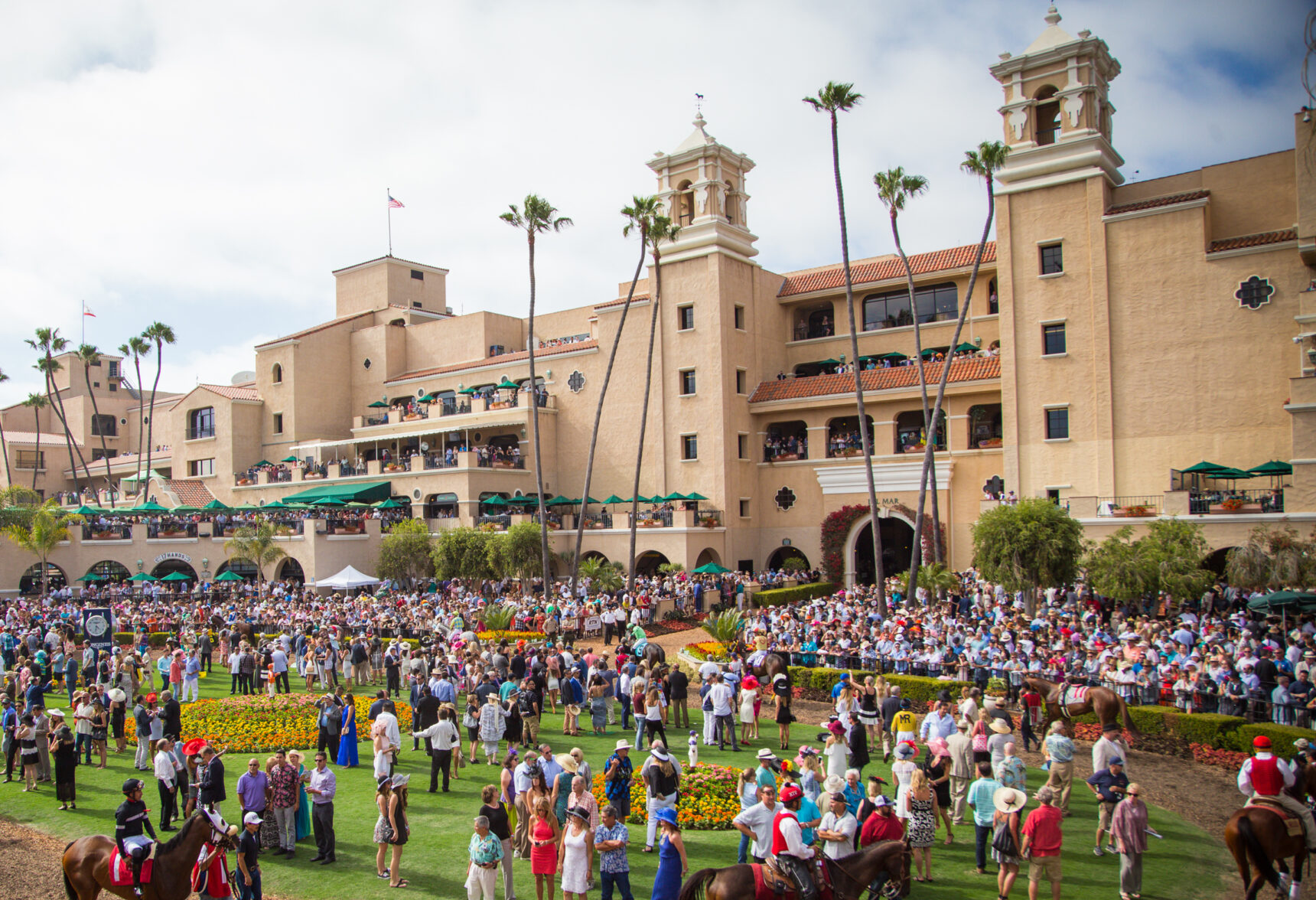
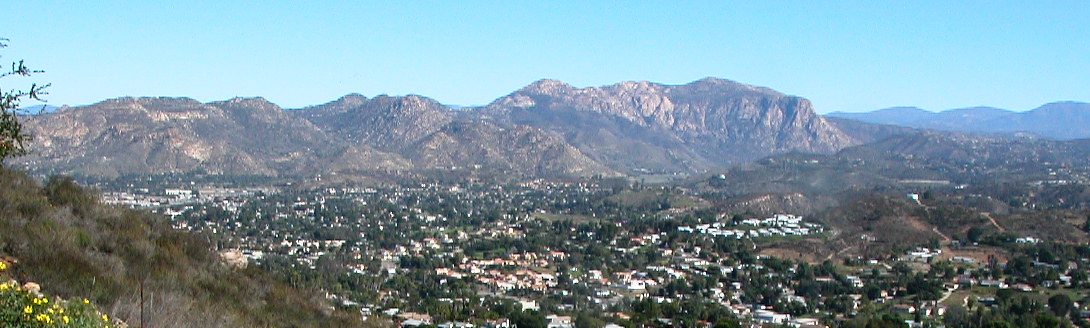
- San Diego and San Diego Bay Oceanside Anza-Borrego Desert Coronado Del Mar El Cajon and the Cuyamaca Mountains

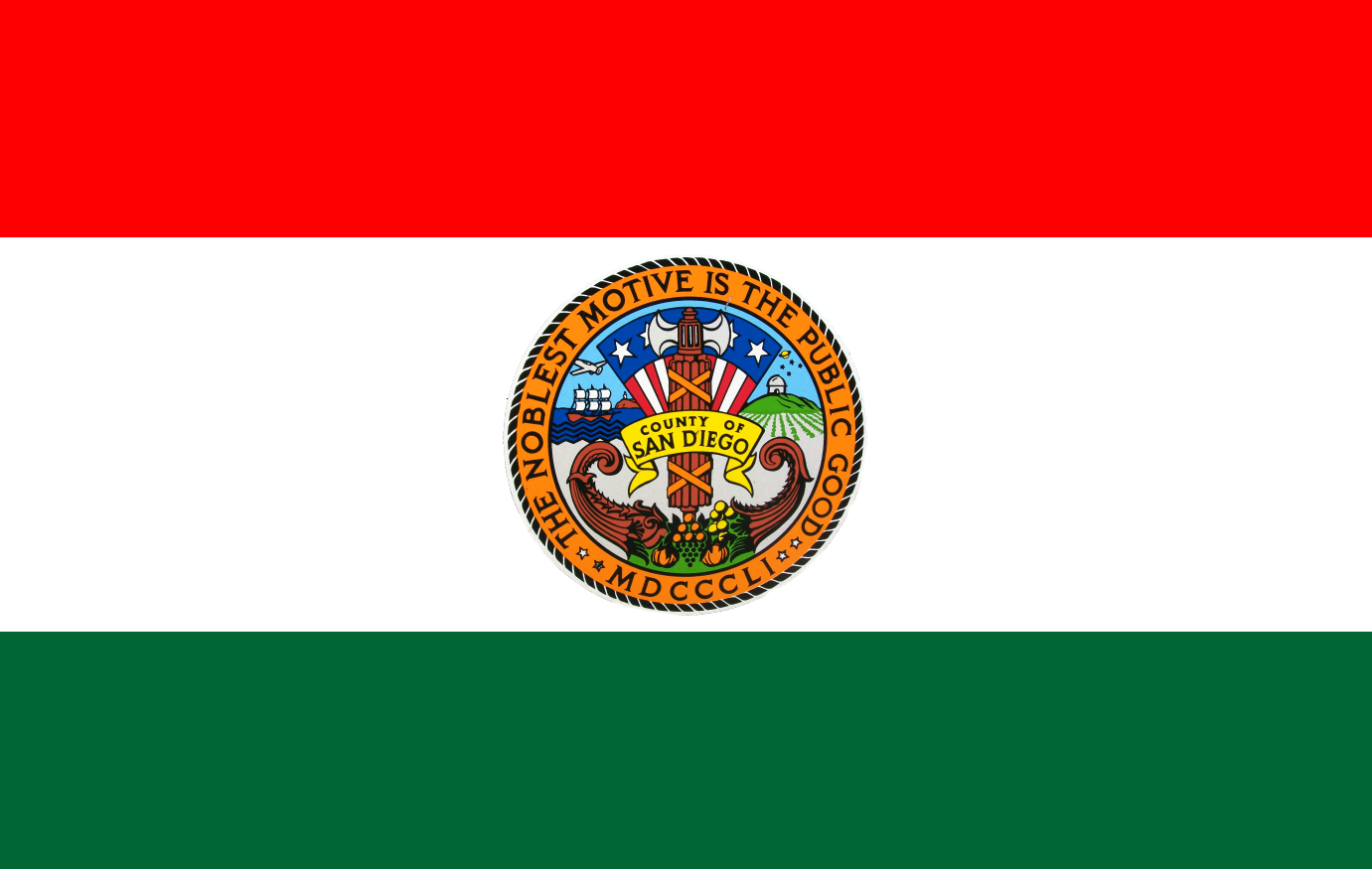
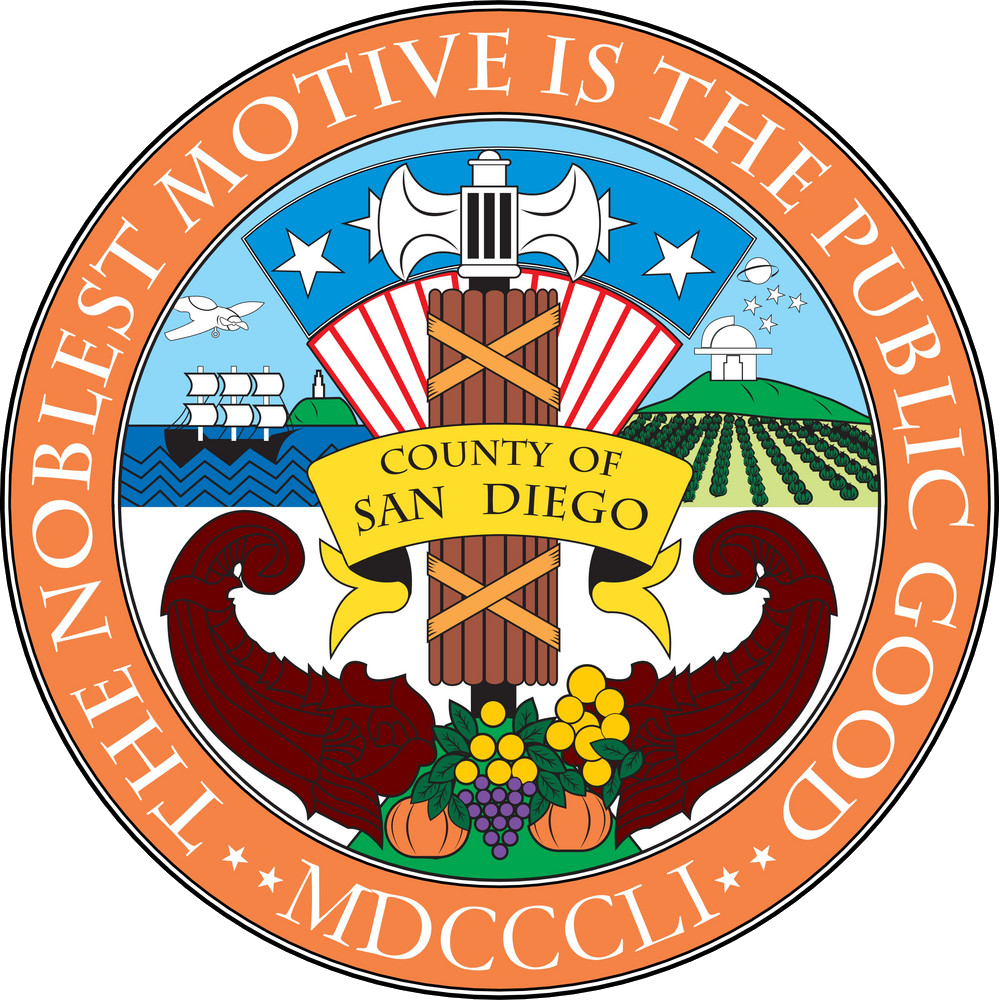
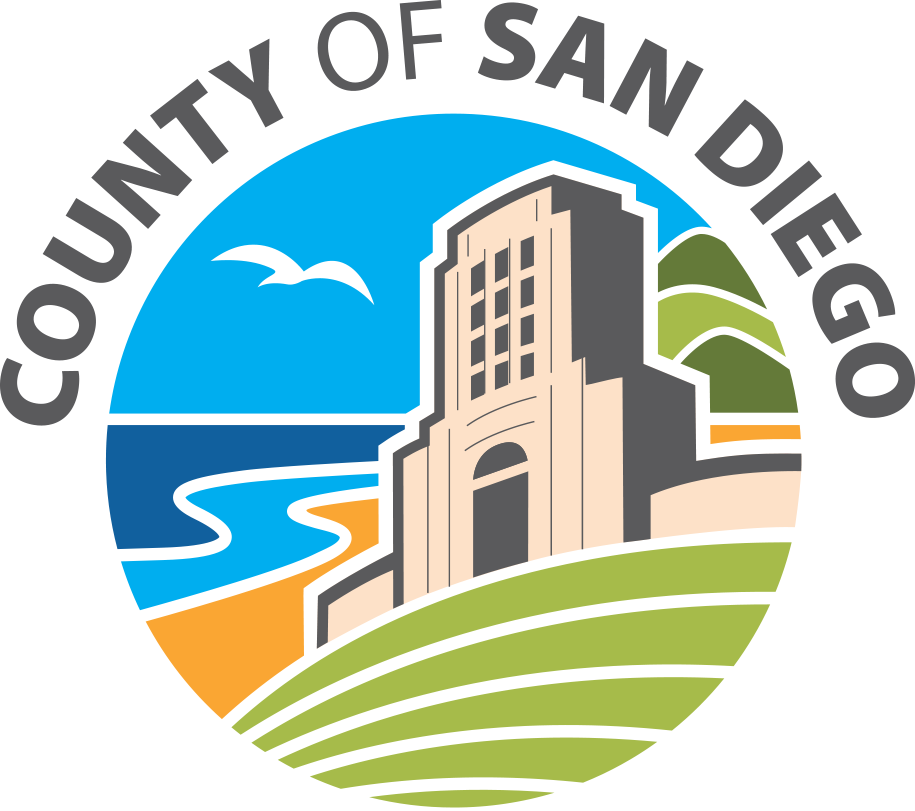
- Flag Seal Logo
- Interactive map of San Diego County
- Location in California
- Coordinates: 33.02°N 116.77°W
- Country: United States
- State: California
- Formed: February 18, 1850
- Named for: Saint Didacus of Alcalá
- County seat: San Diego
- Largest city: San Diego

Government
  - Type: Council–CEO
  - Body: Board of Supervisors
  - Chair: Terra Lawson-Remer (D)
  - Vice Chair: Monica Montgomery Steppe (D)
  - Chair Pro Tem: Paloma Aguirre (D)
  - Board of Supervisors: Supervisors: Paloma Aguirre (D); Joel Anderson (R); Terra Lawson-Remmer (D); Monica Montgomery Steppe (D); Jim Desmond (R)
  - Chief Administrative Officer: Ebony N. Shelton

Area
  - Total: 4,526 sq mi (11,720 km^{2})
  - Land: 4,207 sq mi (10,900 km^{2})
  - Water: 319 sq mi (830 km^{2})
- Highest elevation: 6,533 ft (1,991 m)

Population (April 1, 2020)
  - Total: 3,298,634
  - Estimate (2025): 3,336,081 ▲
  - Density: 784.1/sq mi (302.7/km^{2})

GDP
  - Total: $266.924 billion (2024)
  - Per capita: $81,324 (2024)
- Time zone: UTC–8 (Pacific Time Zone)
  - Summer (DST): UTC–7 (Pacific Daylight Time)
- Area codes: 760/442 and 619/858
- FIPS code: 06-073
- Congressional districts: 48th, 49th, 50th, 51st, 52nd
- Website: sandiegocounty.gov

San Diego County (/ˌsæn diˈeɪɡoʊ/), officially the County of San Diego, is a southern county in the U.S. state of California, north to its border with Mexico. As of the 2020 census, the population was 3,298,634; it is the second-most populous county in California and the fifth-most populous in the United States. Its county seat is San Diego, the second-most populous city in California and the eighth-most populous in the United States.

San Diego County is the southwesternmost county in the 48 contiguous United States, and is a border county. It is home to 18 Indian reservations, the most of any county in the U.S. There are 16 military installations of the United States Navy, Marine Corps, and Coast Guard in the county.

San Diego County comprises the San Diego–Chula Vista–Carlsbad, CA Metropolitan Statistical Area, which is the 18th most populous metropolitan statistical area and the 18th most populous primary statistical area in the U.S. San Diego County is also part of the San Diego–Tijuana region, the largest metropolitan area shared between the U.S. and Mexico. From north to south, San Diego County extends from the southern borders of Orange and Riverside counties to the Mexico–U.S. border and the municipalities of Tijuana and Tecate in Baja California. From west to east, San Diego County stretches from the Pacific Ocean to its boundary with Imperial County, which separated from it in 1907.

San Diego County has more than 70 miles (113 km) of coastline. This forms the most densely populated region of the county, which has a mild Mediterranean to semiarid climate and extensive chaparral vegetation, similar to the rest of the western portion of Southern California. Precipitation and temperature extremes increase to the east, with mountains that receive frost and snow in the winter. These lushly forested mountains receive more rainfall than the average in Southern California, while the desert region of the county lies in a rain shadow to the east, which extends into the Desert Southwest region of North America.

== History ==
The area which is now San Diego County has been inhabited for more than 12,000 years by the Kumeyaay (also known as 'Iipai-Tiipai or by the historical Spanish name Diegueño), Luiseño (also known as Payómkawichum or "People of the West"), Cupeño, Cahuilla, and the Acjachemen people and their local predecessors.

In 1542, the explorer Juan Rodríguez Cabrillo, who may have been born in Portugal but sailed under the flag of Castile, claimed San Diego Bay for the Spanish Empire, and he named the site San Miguel. In November 1602, Sebastián Vizcaíno surveyed the harbor and what are now Mission Bay and Point Loma and named the area for Saint Didacus, a Spaniard more commonly known as San Diego. European settlement in what is now San Diego County began with the founding of the San Diego Presidio and Mission San Diego de Alcalá by Spanish soldiers and clerics in 1769. This county was part of Alta California under the Viceroyalty of New Spain until the Mexican declaration of independence. From 1821 through 1848, this area was part of Mexico.

San Diego County became part of the United States as a result of the Treaty of Guadalupe Hidalgo in 1848, ending the Mexican–American War. This treaty designated the border to pass through a point one marine league south of the southernmost point of the port of San Diego, ensuring that the United States received all of the natural harbor of San Diego Bay.

San Diego County was one of the original counties of California, created at the time of California statehood in 1850.

At the time of its establishment in 1850, San Diego County was relatively large, and included all of southernmost California south and east of Los Angeles County. It included areas of what are now Inyo and San Bernardino Counties, as well as all of what are now Riverside and Imperial Counties.

During the later part of the 19th century, there were numerous changes in the boundaries of San Diego County, when various areas were separated to make up the counties mentioned above. The most recent changes were the establishments of Riverside County in 1893 and Imperial County in 1907. Imperial County was also the last county to be established in California, and after this division, San Diego no longer extended from the Pacific Ocean to the Colorado River, and it no longer covered the entire border between California and Mexico.

== Geography ==
Map of the physiographic provinces of the lower 48 United States, showing the Lower Californian province (number 12).

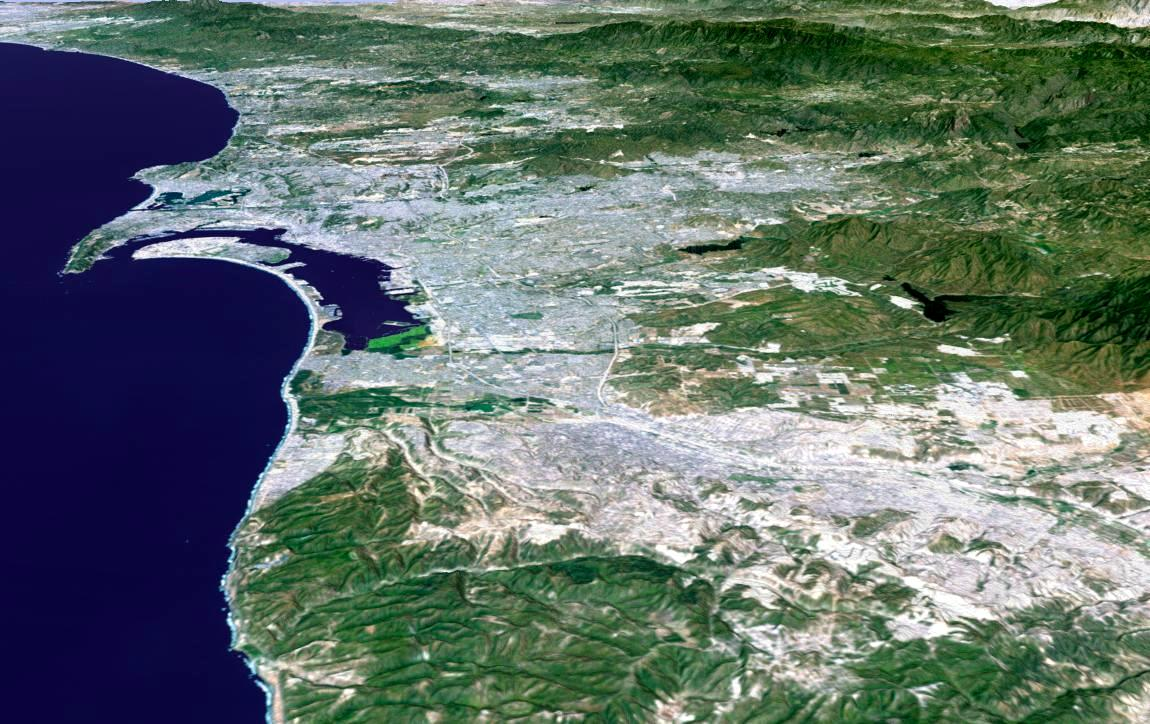
Many of the cities seen from the sky as part of the San Diego–Tijuana metropolitan area

According to the U.S. Census Bureau, the county has an area of 4,526 square miles (11,720 km^{2}), of which 4,207 square miles (10,900 km^{2}) is land and 319 square miles (830 km^{2}) (7.0%) is water. The county is larger in area than the combined states of Rhode Island and Delaware.

San Diego County has a varied topography. On its western side is more than 70 miles (113 km) of coastline. Most of San Diego between the coast and the Laguna Mountains consists of hills, mesas, and small canyons. Snow-capped (in winter) mountains rise to the east, with the Sonoran Desert farther to the east. The Cleveland National Forest is spread across the central portion of the county, while Anza-Borrego Desert State Park occupies most of the northeast.

Although the county's western third is primarily urban, the mountains and deserts in the eastern two-thirds are primarily undeveloped backcountry. Most of these backcountry areas are home to a native plant community known as chaparral. San Diego County contains more than 1,000,000 acres (4,000 km^{2}) of chaparral, twice as much as any other California county.

Periodically the area has been subject to wildfires that force thousands to evacuate. The most recent are the December 2017 Lilac Fire, the May 2014 San Diego County wildfires, the Witch Creek Fire in 2007, and the Cedar Fire in 2003. California defines a fire season in which fires are most likely to occur, usually between late July and late October (which are the driest months of the area). Signs posted in numerous spots of the county provide information on the level of threats from fires based on weather conditions.

=== Regions ===
Northern San Diego County is known as North County; the eastern suburbs are collectively known as East County; the rural areas located further east and extending to the Imperial County line are known as the Mountain Empire; and the southern suburbs, extending to the Mexican border, are collectively known as the South Bay or South County, including South San Diego, an exclave of the city of San Diego which has no land connection to the rest of the city.

=== Location ===
San Diego County is bordered on the northwest by Orange County, on the north by Riverside County; on the east by Imperial County; on the south by Mexico; and on the west by the Pacific Ocean.

=== Climate ===
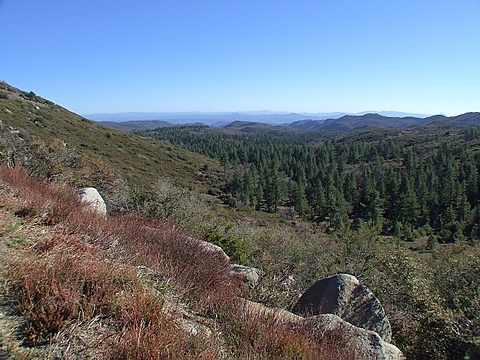
Cleveland National Forest

Under the Köppen climate classification system, the urban and suburban San Diego area straddles areas of Mediterranean climate (Csa) to the north and hot semi-arid climate (BSh) to the south and east. As a result, it is often described as "arid Mediterranean" and "semi-arid steppe." Farther east, arid desert conditions prevail. Western San Diego's climate is characterized by warm, dry summers and mild winters with most of the annual precipitation falling between November and March. The city has mild, mostly dry weather, with an average of 201 days above 70 °F (21 °C) and low rainfall (9–13 inches (23–33 cm) annually). Summer temperatures are generally warm, with average highs of 70–78 °F (21–26 °C) and lows of 55–66 °F (13–19 °C). Temperatures exceed 90 °F (32 °C) only four days a year. Most rainfall occurs from November to April. Winter temperatures are mild, with average high temperatures of 66–70 °F (19–21 °C) and lows of 50–56 °F (10–13 °C).

The climate in the San Diego area, like much of California, often varies significantly over short geographical distances resulting in microclimates. In San Diego's case this is mainly due to the city's topography (the Bay, and the numerous hills, mountains, and canyons). Frequently, particularly during the "May gray/June gloom" period, a thick marine layer will keep the air cool and damp within a few miles of the coast, but will yield to bright cloudless sunshine approximately 5–10 miles (8.0–16.1 km) inland. This happens every year in May and June. Even in the absence of June gloom, inland areas tend to experience much more significant temperature variations than coastal areas, where the ocean serves as a moderating influence. Thus, for example, downtown San Diego averages January lows of 48 °F (9 °C) and August highs of 77 °F (25 °C). The city of El Cajon, just 10 miles (16 km) northeast of downtown San Diego, averages January lows of 42 °F (6 °C) and August highs of 89 °F (32 °C). Julian, in the mountains, has an average January low of 29 °F (−2 °C) and August high of 85 °F (29 °C). Borrego Springs, in the Colorado Desert, has an average January low of 43 °F (6 °C) and August high of 106 °F (41 °C).

Rainfall along the coast averages about 10 inches (25 cm) of precipitation annually, which occurs mainly during the cooler months of December through April. Though there are few wet days per month during the rainy period, rainfall can be heavy when it does occur. However, the rainfall is greater in the higher elevations of San Diego. Some of the higher areas of San Diego, such as Palomar Mountain and the Laguna Mountains, receive 20–40 inches (51–102 cm) of rain per year, supporting lush forests similar to the Sierra Nevada and California Coast Range. The Colorado Desert portion of the county lies to the east of the mountains, which receives the least amount of precipitation; Borrego Springs, the largest population center in the desert, averages only 5 inches (13 cm), with a high evaporation rate.

Climate data for San Diego Int'l Airport (1991–2020 normals, (Note: Mean monthly maxima and minima (i.e. the highest and lowest temperature readings during an entire month or year) calculated based on data at said location from 1991 to 2020.) extremes 1874–present) (Note: Official precipitation records for San Diego were kept at the Weather Bureau Office in downtown from October 1850 to December 1859 at the Mission San Diego and from November 1871 to June 1939 and a variety of buildings at downtown, and at San Diego Int'l (Lindbergh Field) since July 1939. Temperature records, however, only date from October 1874. For more information on data coverage, see ThreadEx)
Month	Jan	Feb	Mar	Apr	May	Jun	Jul	Aug	Sep	Oct	Nov	Dec	Year
Record high °F (°C)	88 (31)	91 (33)	99 (37)	98 (37)	98 (37)	101 (38)	100 (38)	98 (37)	111 (44)	107 (42)	100 (38)	88 (31)	111 (44)
Mean maximum °F (°C)	78.8 (26.0)	78.6 (25.9)	80.2 (26.8)	82.1 (27.8)	79.3 (26.3)	79.6 (26.4)	82.9 (28.3)	85.2 (29.6)	90.6 (32.6)	87.8 (31.0)	85.4 (29.7)	77.0 (25.0)	94.0 (34.4)
Mean daily maximum °F (°C)	66.4 (19.1)	66.2 (19.0)	67.0 (19.4)	68.8 (20.4)	69.5 (20.8)	71.7 (22.1)	75.3 (24.1)	77.3 (25.2)	77.2 (25.1)	74.6 (23.7)	70.7 (21.5)	66.0 (18.9)	70.9 (21.6)
Daily mean °F (°C)	58.4 (14.7)	59.0 (15.0)	60.7 (15.9)	62.9 (17.2)	64.8 (18.2)	67.2 (19.6)	70.7 (21.5)	72.4 (22.4)	71.7 (22.1)	68.1 (20.1)	62.7 (17.1)	57.9 (14.4)	64.7 (18.2)
Mean daily minimum °F (°C)	50.3 (10.2)	51.8 (11.0)	54.5 (12.5)	57.1 (13.9)	60.0 (15.6)	62.6 (17.0)	66.1 (18.9)	67.5 (19.7)	66.2 (19.0)	61.5 (16.4)	54.8 (12.7)	49.8 (9.9)	58.5 (14.7)
Mean minimum °F (°C)	43.7 (6.5)	46.1 (7.8)	48.7 (9.3)	51.9 (11.1)	55.8 (13.2)	59.3 (15.2)	63.0 (17.2)	63.9 (17.7)	61.8 (16.6)	55.5 (13.1)	48.2 (9.0)	43.0 (6.1)	42.6 (5.9)
Record low °F (°C)	25 (−4)	34 (1)	36 (2)	39 (4)	45 (7)	50 (10)	54 (12)	54 (12)	50 (10)	43 (6)	36 (2)	32 (0)	25 (−4)
Average precipitation inches (mm)	1.98 (50)	2.20 (56)	1.46 (37)	0.65 (17)	0.28 (7.1)	0.05 (1.3)	0.08 (2.0)	0.01 (0.25)	0.12 (3.0)	0.50 (13)	0.79 (20)	1.67 (42)	9.79 (249)
Average precipitation days (≥ 0.01 in)	6.5	7.1	6.2	3.8	2.2	0.7	0.7	0.3	0.9	2.4	3.7	5.8	40.3
Average relative humidity (%)	63.1	65.7	67.3	67.0	70.6	74.0	74.6	74.1	72.7	69.4	66.3	63.7	69.0
Average dew point °F (°C)	42.8 (6.0)	45.3 (7.4)	47.3 (8.5)	49.5 (9.7)	53.1 (11.7)	57.0 (13.9)	61.2 (16.2)	62.4 (16.9)	60.6 (15.9)	55.6 (13.1)	48.6 (9.2)	43.2 (6.2)	52.2 (11.2)
Mean monthly sunshine hours	239.3	227.4	261.0	276.2	250.5	242.4	304.7	295.0	253.3	243.4	230.1	231.3	3,054.6
Percentage possible sunshine	75	74	70	71	58	57	70	71	68	69	73	74	69
Source: NOAA (sun, relative humidity, and dew point 1961–1990)

=== Adjacent counties and municipalities ===
Counties adjacent to San Diego County, California

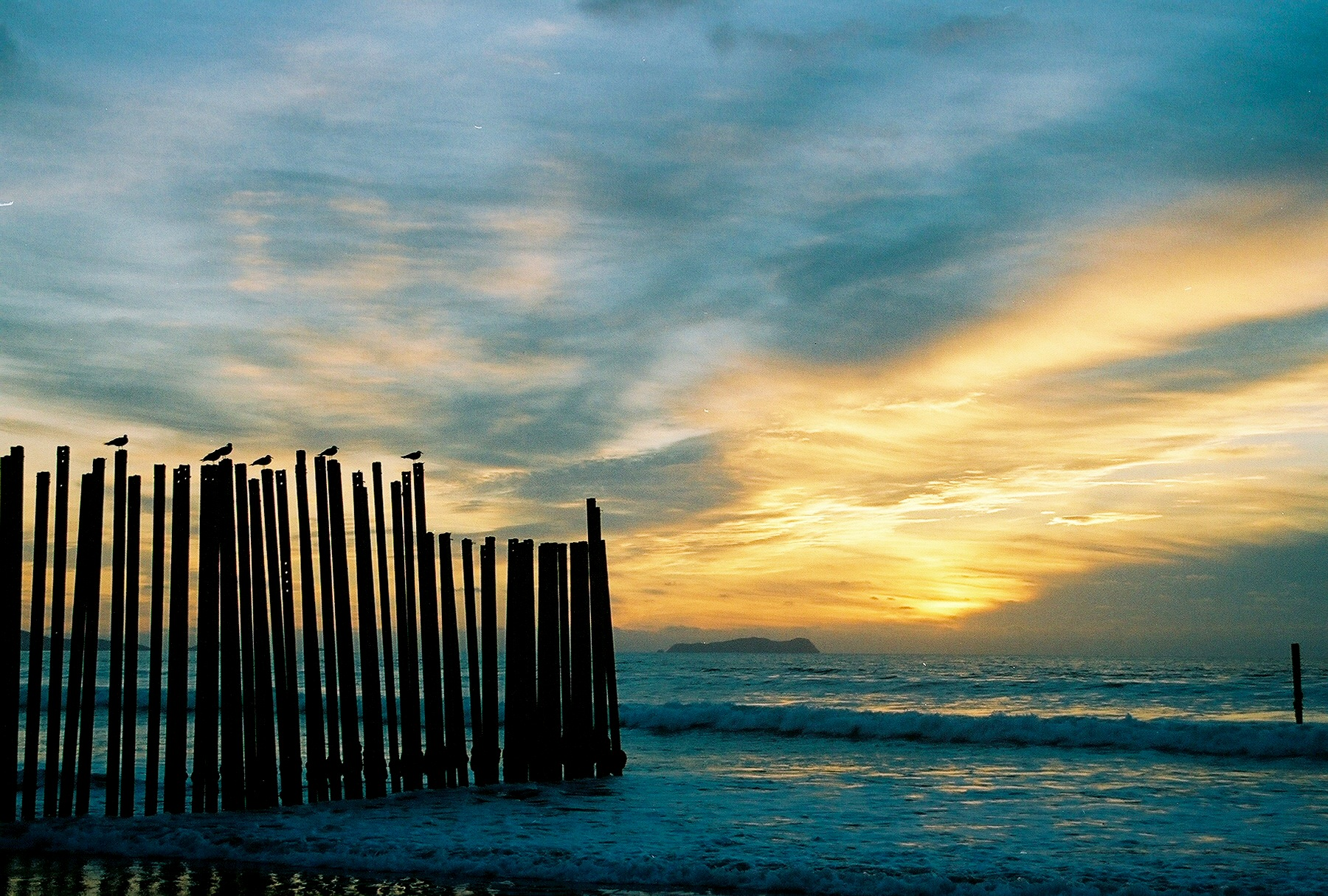
Beach at Border Field State Park; San Diego is on the right while Tijuana is on the left.

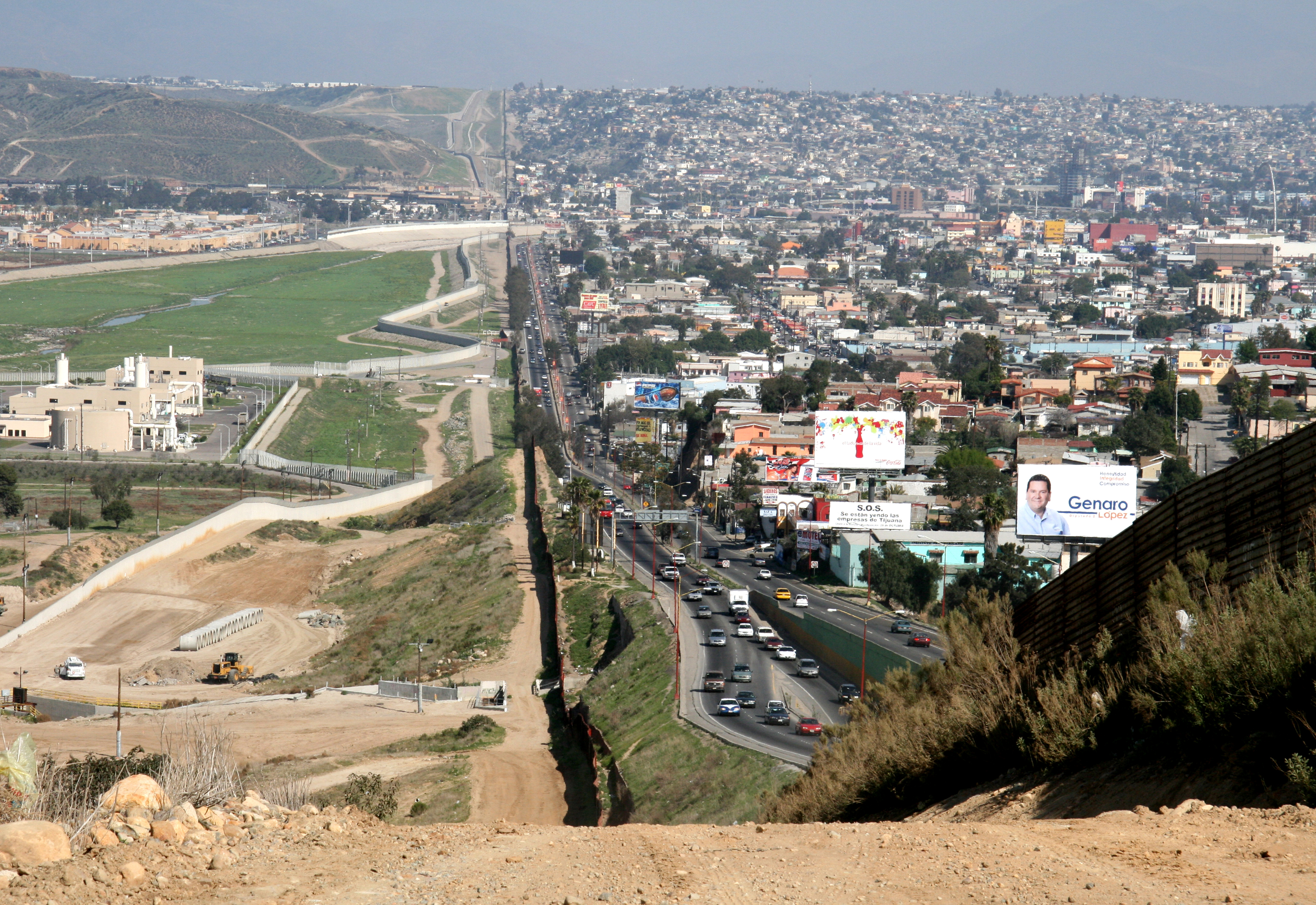
Border fence between Tijuana (right) and San Diego's border patrol offices (left)

=== National protected areas ===
- Cabrillo National Monument
- Cleveland National Forest (part)
- San Diego National Wildlife Refuge Complex, which includes
  - San Diego National Wildlife Refuge
  - San Diego Bay National Wildlife Refuge
  - Tijuana Slough National Wildlife Refuge
  - Seal Beach National Wildlife Refuge (located in Orange County)

There are seven official wilderness areas in San Diego County that are part of the National Wilderness Preservation System (NWPS). Four of these are integral parts of Cleveland National Forest, whereas three are managed by the Bureau of Land Management (BLM). Some of these extend into neighboring counties (as indicated below):

- Otay Mountain Wilderness (BLM)
- Pine Creek Wilderness (Cleveland National Forest)
- Hauser Wilderness (Cleveland National Forest)
- Carrizo Gorge Wilderness (BLM)
- Sawtooth Mountains Wilderness (BLM)
- Agua Tibia Wilderness (Cleveland National Forest) partly in Riverside County
- San Mateo Canyon Wilderness (Cleveland National Forest) mostly in Riverside County

=== State parks and protected areas ===
- Anza-Borrego Desert State Park (majority)
- Torrey Pines State Natural Reserve
- Cuyamaca Rancho State Park
- Palomar Mountain State Park
- San Pasqual Battlefield State Historic Park
- Old Town San Diego State Historic Park
- Border Field State Park
- Tijuana River National Estuarine Research Reserve
- San Onofre State Beach
- Moonlight State Beach
- Carlsbad State Beach
- South Carlsbad State Beach
- Leucadia State Beach
- San Elijo State Beach
- Cardiff State Beach
- Torrey Pines State Beach
- Silver Strand State Beach

=== Mountains ===
- Cuyamaca Mountains
- In-Ko-Pah Mountains
- Jacumba Mountains
- Laguna Mountains
- Palomar Mountain
- Peninsular Ranges
- San Ysidro Mountains
- Santa Ana Mountains
- Volcan Mountains

There are 236 mountain summits and peaks in San Diego County including:

- Black Mountain
- Cuyamaca Peak (second highest point in San Diego County)
- Cowles Mountain (highest point in the city of San Diego)
- Mount Helix
- Hot Springs Mountain (highest point in San Diego County)
- Margarita Peak
- Mount Soledad
- Stonewall Mountain
- El Cajon Mountain
- Woodson Mountain (known for Potato Chip Rock)

=== Bays and lagoons ===
- Buena Vista Lagoon
- Agua Hedionda Lagoon
- Batiquitos Lagoon
- San Elijo Lagoon
- Los Peñasquitos Lagoon
- Mission Bay
- San Diego Bay

=== Lakes ===
- Lake Cuyamaca
- Lake Hodges
- Santee Lakes
- Sweetwater Reservoir
- Upper Otay Reservoir
- Lower Otay Reservoir
- Lake Wohlford
- El Capitan Reservoir
- Sutherland Reservoir
- Lake Henshaw
- Lake Murray
- San Vicente Reservoir
- Lake Jennings
- Barrett Dam
- Natural Rock Tanks
- Little Laguna Lake
- Big Laguna Lake
- Big Lake
- Twin Lakes
- Jean Lake
- Lost Lake
- Swan Lake
- Lake Miramar
- Lake Poway
- Dixon Lake
- Lindo Lake

=== Rivers ===
- San Diego River
- San Luis Rey River
- San Dieguito River
- Sweetwater River
- Otay River
- Tijuana River
  - Tijuana River Mouth State Marine Conservation Area
- Santa Margarita River

=== Forests ===
- Marys Grove

=== Environmental risks ===
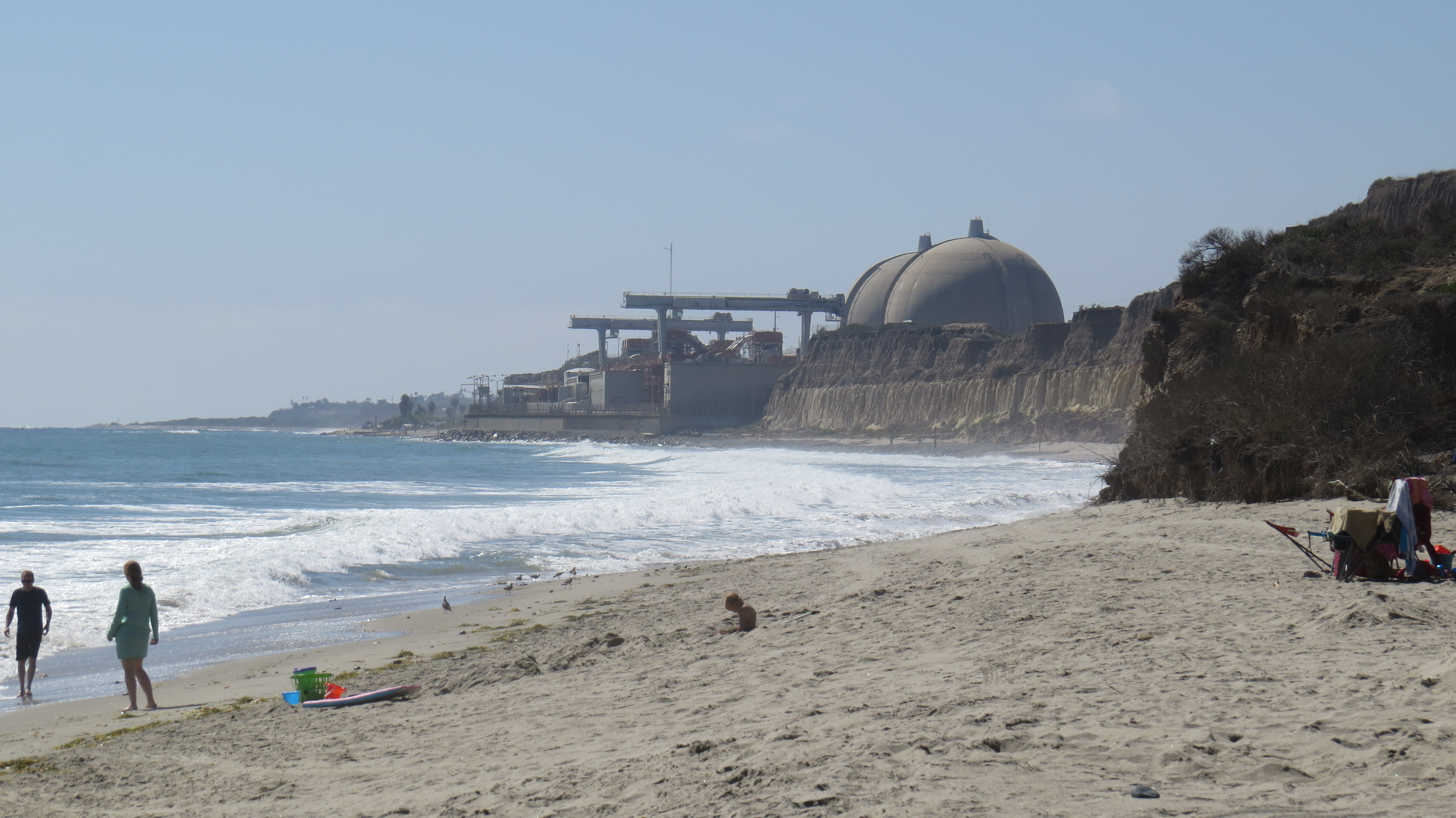
San Onofre Nuclear Generating Station

More than 1,700 tons of radioactive waste are stored at San Onofre Nuclear Generating Station, which sits in an area where there is a record of past tsunamis.

Portions of the Tijuana River has been heavily contaminated with sewage since the 1990's. There has been efforts to expand the South Bay International Wastewater Treatment Plant, such as one designated by the United States Environmental Protection Agency in 2025.

== Demographics ==
In the 1847 census of San Diego County ordered by Richard Barnes Mason, it found that 2,287 people lived in the county, to include Native Americans, Pacific Islanders, and African Americans. Since at least 2014, San Diego County is the fifth most populous county in the United States. In 2000, only about 3% of San Diego County residents left the county for work while 40,000 people commuted into the metropolitan area.

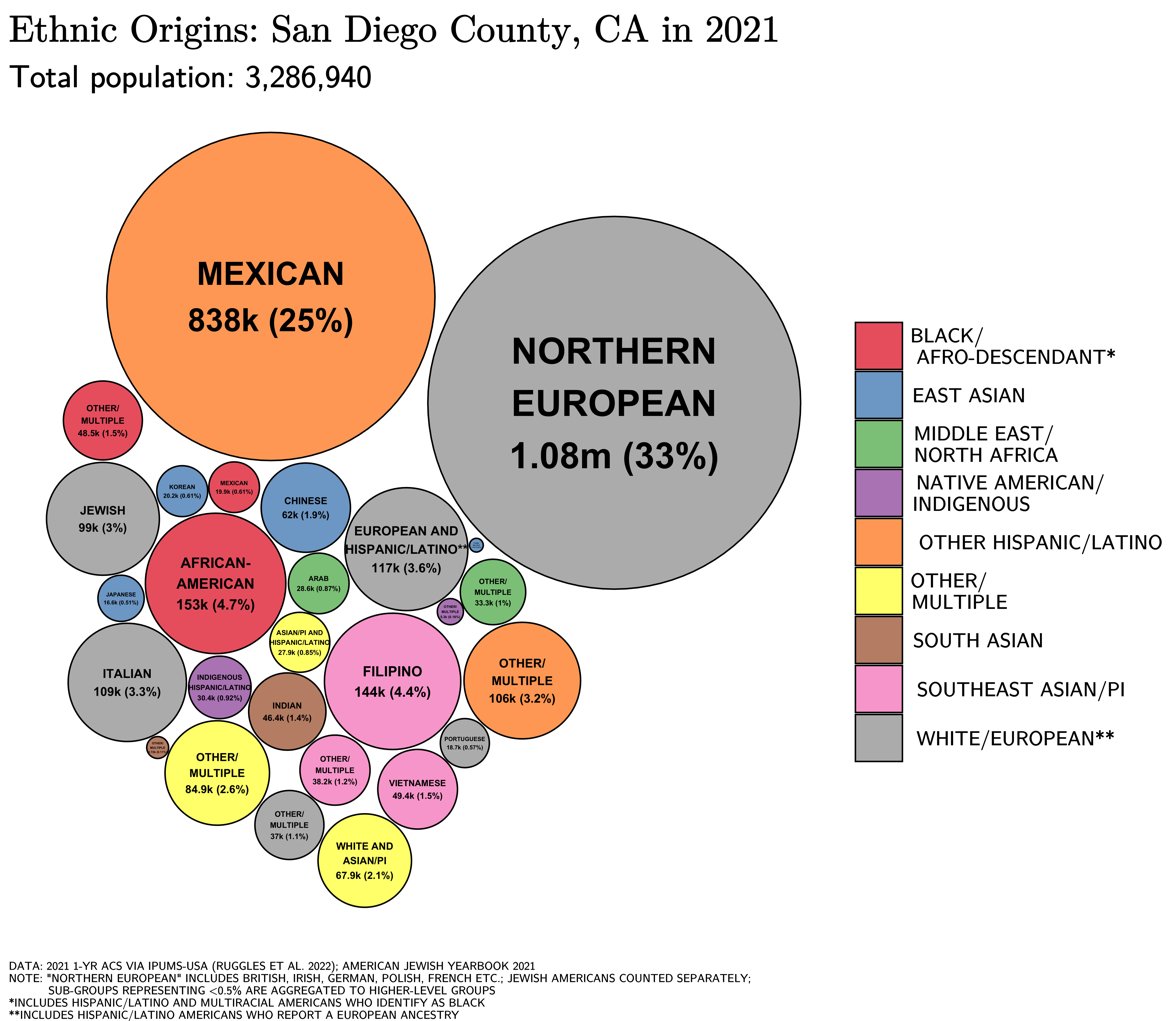
Ethnic origins in San Diego County

Historical population
Census	Pop.	Note	%±
1850	798		—
1860	4,324		441.9%
1870	4,951		14.5%
1880	8,618		74.1%
1890	34,987		306.0%
1900	35,090		0.3%
1910	61,665		75.7%
1920	112,248		82.0%
1930	209,659		86.8%
1940	289,348		38.0%
1950	556,808		92.4%
1960	1,033,011		85.5%
1970	1,357,854		31.4%
1980	1,861,846		37.1%
1990	2,498,016		34.2%
2000	2,813,833		12.6%
2010	3,095,313		10.0%
2020	3,298,634		6.6%
2025 (est.)	3,336,081	▲	1.1%
U.S. Decennial Census; 1790–1960 1900–1990; 1990–2000 2010 2020

=== 2020 census ===
As of the 2020 census, the county had a population of 3,298,634 with a median age of 37.1 years; 20.9% were under the age of 18 and 15.2% were 65 years of age or older. For every 100 females there were 99.2 males, and among residents age 18 and over there were 97.7 males per 100 females.

The racial makeup of the county was 49.5% White, 4.7% Black or African American, 1.2% American Indian and Alaska Native, 12.5% Asian, 0.5% Native Hawaiian and Pacific Islander, 15.8% from some other race, and 15.8% from two or more races. Hispanic or Latino residents of any race comprised 33.9% of the population.

95.6% of residents lived in urban areas, while 4.4% lived in rural areas.

There were 1,158,764 households in the county, of which 32.2% had children under the age of 18 living with them and 25.8% had a female householder with no spouse or partner present. About 23.2% of all households were made up of individuals and 9.0% had someone living alone who was 65 years of age or older.

There were 1,228,505 housing units, of which 5.7% were vacant. Among occupied housing units, 53.5% were owner-occupied and 46.5% were renter-occupied. The homeowner vacancy rate was 0.9% and the rental vacancy rate was 4.7%.

=== Racial and ethnic composition ===
San Diego County, California – Racial and ethnic composition Note: the US Census treats Hispanic/Latino as an ethnic category. This table excludes Latinos from the racial categories and assigns them to a separate category. Hispanics/Latinos may be of any race.
Race / Ethnicity (NH = Non-Hispanic)	Pop 1980	Pop 1990	Pop 2000	Pop 2010	Pop 2020	% 1980	% 1990	% 2000	% 2010	% 2020
White alone (NH)	1,374,649	1,633,281	1,548,833	1,500,047	1,422,205	73.83%	65.38%	55.04%	48.46%	43.11%
Black or African American alone (NH)	102,165	149,898	154,487	146,600	145,014	5.49%	6.00%	5.49%	4.74%	4.40%
Native American or Alaska Native alone (NH)	14,616	15,050	15,253	14,098	12,841	0.79%	0.60%	0.54%	0.46%	0.39%
Asian alone (NH)	89,861	185,144	245,297	328,058	400,589	4.83%	7.41%	8.72%	10.60%	12.14%
Native Hawaiian or Pacific Islander alone (NH)	x	x	12,164	13,504	12,991	0.43%	0.44%	0.43%	0.44%	0.39%
Other race alone (NH)	5,378	3,862	5,822	6,715	18,125	0.29%	0.15%	0.21%	0.22%	0.55%
Mixed race or Multiracial (NH)	x	x	81,012	94,943	167,240	x	x	2.88%	3.07%	5.07%
Hispanic or Latino (any race)	275,177	510,781	750,965	991,348	1,119,629	14.78%	20.45%	26.69%	32.03%	33.94%
Total	1,861,846	2,498,016	2,813,833	3,095,313	3,298,634	100.00%	100.00%	100.00%	100.00%	100.00%

=== American Community Survey 2025 data ===
The United States Census Bureau estimated that in 2025, San Diego County’s population was 3,282,248. It was also estimated that the county's population was 41.32% Non-Hispanic White, 35.70% Hispanic or Latino, 4.42% Non-Hispanic Black, 13.12% Asian, 0.40% Native American, 0.38% Pacific Islander, and 4.65% Multiracial.

Total	Population	Percentage
Non-Hispanic White	1,356,382	41.32%
Hispanic or Latino	1,171,830	35.70%
Non-Hispanic Black	144,991	4.42%
Asian	430,737	13.12%
Native American	12,979	0.40%
Pacific Islander	12,629	0.38%
Non-Hispanic Multiracial	152,700	4.65%

=== 2010 census ===
The 2010 United States census reported that San Diego County had a population of 3,095,313. The racial makeup of San Diego County was 1,981,442 (64.0%) White, 158,213 (5.1%) African American, 26,340 (0.9%) Native American, 336,091 (10.9%) Asian (4.7% Filipino, 1.6% Vietnamese, 1.4% Chinese, 3.2% Other Asian), 15,337 (0.5%) Pacific Islander, 419,465 (13.6%) from other races, and 158,425 (5.0%) from two or more races. Hispanic or Latino of any race were 991,348 people (32.0%). Including those of mixed race, the total number of residents with Asian ancestry was 407,984.

=== 2009 estimates ===
As of 2009, the racial makeup of the county was 79.4% White American, 5.6% Black or African American, 1% Native American, 10.4% Asian, 0.5% Pacific Islander, 10.3% from other races, and 3.6% from two or more races. 31.3% of the population were Hispanic or Latino of any race.

67.0% spoke only English at home; 21.9% spoke Spanish, 3.1% Tagalog and 1.2% Vietnamese.

=== 2000 census ===
In 2000, there were 994,677 households, out of which 33.9% had children under the age of 18 living with them, 50.7% were married couples living together, 11.6% had a female householder with no husband present, and 33.3% were non-families. 24.2% of all households were made up of individuals, and 7.9% had someone living alone who was 65 years of age or older. The average household size was 2.73 and the average family size was 3.29.

As of 2000, 25.7% of the population was under the age of 18, 11.30% was from 18 to 24, 32.0% from 25 to 44, 19.8% from 45 to 64, and 11.2% was 65 years of age or older. The median age was 33 years. For every 100 females, there were 101.2 males. For every 100 females age 18 and over, there were 99.7 males.

=== Other demographic data ===
In 2012, it was estimated that there were 198,000 unauthorized immigrants; the origin of the plurality of them is Mexico.

In 2018, the median household income was $70,824; most people spend more than 30% of their income on housing costs. In August of that year, the median home price was $583,000; this is lower than the median home price in Los Angeles, and Orange counties.

=== Income ===
According to the 2000 census, the median income for a household in the county was $47,067, and the median income for a family was $53,438. Males had a median income of $36,952 versus $30,356 for females. The per capita income for the county was $22,926. About 8.9% of families and 12.4% of the population were below the poverty line, including 16.5% of those under age 18 and 6.8% of those age 65 or over.

Much of the county's high-income residents are concentrated in the northern part of the city of San Diego. The San Diego metropolitan area has two places with both a population of over 50,000 and a per capita income of over $40,000: Carlsbad and Encinitas.

The county's largest continuous high-income urban area is a triangle from a first point on the northern edge of Carlsbad, a second point southeast of Escondido, and a third point on the southern edge of La Jolla. It contains all or most of the cities of Carlsbad, Encinitas, Solana Beach, Del Mar, and Poway in addition to a substantial portion of northern San Diego.

=== Homelessness ===
According to a point-in-time count taken for the San Diego Regional Task Force on Homelessness, there were 8,576 homeless individuals on January 6, 2018, a 6% decrease from 2017. 3,586 were sheltered, and 4,990 were not. 4,912 (75.3%) were in the city of San Diego. North County Inland had 1,153 (13.4%), North County Coastal with 822 homeless (9.6%), 602 (7%) were found in South County, and 1,087 (12.7%) in East County.

=== Religion ===
According to a 2014 Pew Research Center survey, 68% of adults in the county were Christian, of whom 32% were Catholic. 27% were religiously unaffiliated, and 5% adhered to a non-Christian faith. According to the University of Southern California, in 2010, the largest faith in the county was Catholicism, followed by non-denominational Christians, and Mormons.

In 2014, the county had 978 religious organizations, the seventh most out of all US counties.

=== Immigration data ===
In 2014 according to Pew Research Center, there are about 170,000 undocumented immigrants living in the region. San Diego has been a destination for trafficked minors from Mexico and the Philippines. In 2018, the United States Border Patrol caught an average of over a hundred individuals crossing the border illegally each day.

== Economy ==
San Diego County and Imperial County are part of the Southern Border Region, one of nine such regions. As a regional economy, the Southern Border Region is the smallest but most economically diverse region in the state. However, the two counties maintain weak relations and have little in common aside from their common border. The region has a high cost of living. This includes the highest cost of water in the United States. As of 2018, San Diego County is within the top ten highest cost of rent in the United States; this has led to people moving out of the county.

=== Agriculture ===
San Diego County's agriculture industry was worth $1.85 billion in 2013, and is one of the top five egg producing counties in the United States. In 2013, San Diego County also had the most small farms of any county in the United States, and had the 19th largest agricultural economy of any county in the United States. According to the San Diego Farm Bureau, San Diego County is the United States' leading producer of avocados and nursery crops. Until the early 20th century, San Diego County had a thriving wine industry; however the 1916 Charles Hatfield flood was the beginning of the end of the industry which included the destruction of the Daneri winery in Otay Valley. As of October 2016, there are roughly one hundred vineyards and wineries in San Diego County.

By the 2019–2020 statistical survey, California Department of Food & Agriculture (cdfa) found that the nursery trade dominated the county's agriculture by dollar value. Second place went to avocado production.

=== Breweries ===
The county has been called "the Craft Beer Capital of America". Brewing has been one of the fastest-growing business sectors with local breweries ranking among the 50 largest craft brewers in the United States and breweries that are consistently rated among the top breweries in the world.

=== Cannabis ===
Commercial operations to grow, test, or sell cannabis are not allowed in the unincorporated areas of the county. Companies must be licensed by the local agency to operate and each city or county may authorize none or only some of these activities. Local governments may not prohibit adults, who are in compliance with state laws, from growing, using, or transporting marijuana for personal use.

=== Tourism ===
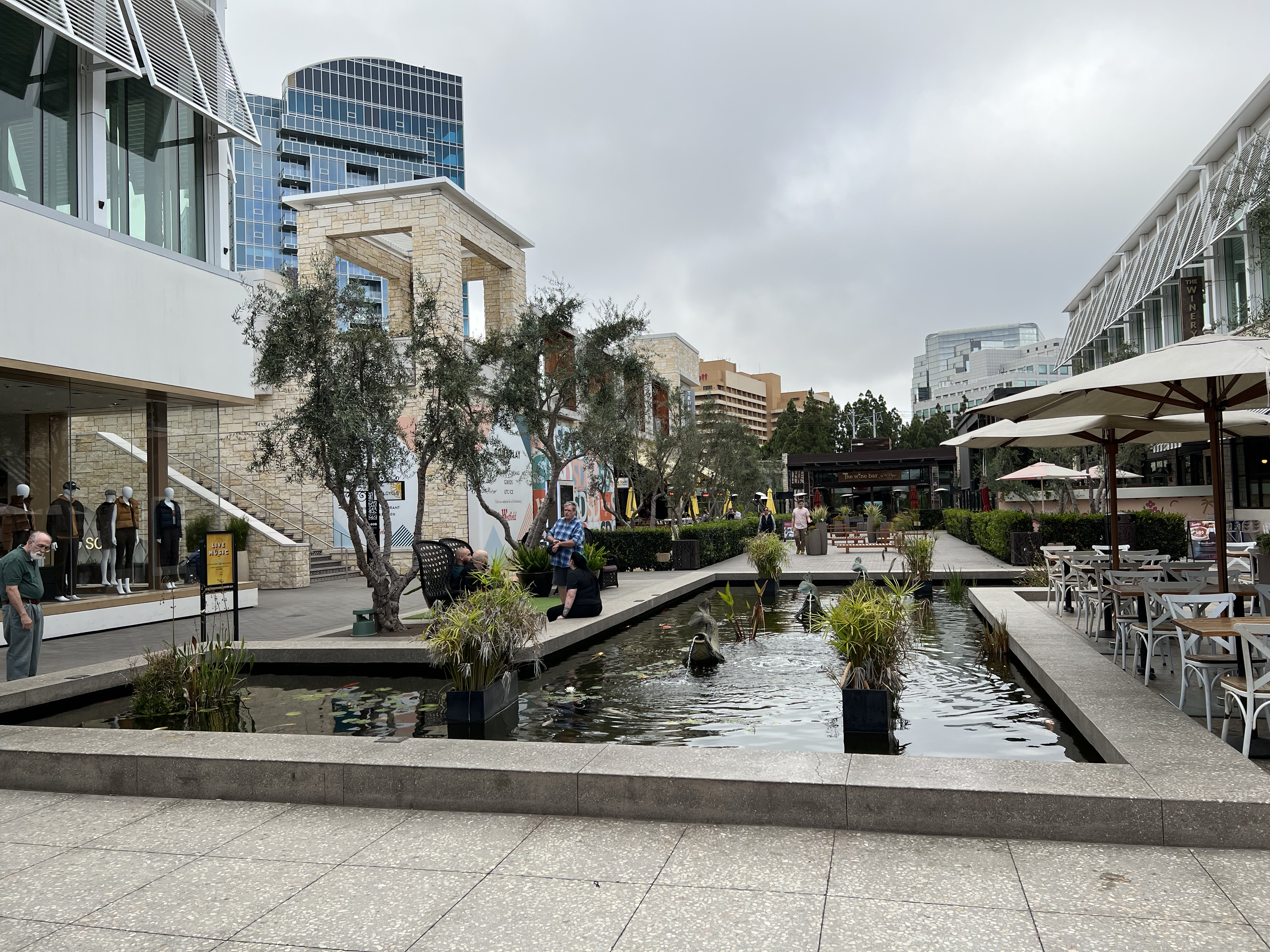
Westfield UTC in University City

Tourism plays a large part in the economics of the San Diego metropolitan area. Tourists are drawn to the region for a well rounded experience, everything from shopping to surfing as well as its mild climate. Its numerous tourist destinations include Westfield UTC, Seaport Village, and Fashion Valley for shopping. SeaWorld San Diego and Legoland California as amusement parks. Golf courses such as Torrey Pines Golf Course and Balboa Park Golf Course. Museums such as the Museum of Us, the San Diego Museum of Art, Fleet Science Center, San Diego Natural History Museum, USS Midway Museum, and the San Diego Air & Space Museum. Historical places such as the Gaslamp Quarter, Balboa Park and Old Town San Diego State Historic Park. Wildlife refuges, zoos, and aquariums such as the San Diego Zoo, San Diego Zoo Safari Park, Birch Aquarium, Living Coast Discovery Center, and the San Diego-La Jolla Underwater Park. Outdoor destinations include the Peninsular Ranges for hiking, biking, mountainboarding and trail riding. Surfing locations include Swami's, Stone Steps Beach, Torrey Pines State Beach, Cardiff State Beach, San Onofre State Beach and the southern portion of Black's Beach.

The region is host to the second largest cruise ship industry in California which generates an estimated $2 million annually from purchases of food, fuel, supplies, and maintenance services. In 2008, the Port of San Diego hosted 252 ship calls and more than 800,000 passengers.

== Culture ==
The culture of San Diego is influenced heavily by American and Mexican cultures due to its position as a border town, its large Hispanic population, and its history as part of Spanish America and Mexico. The area's longtime association with the U.S. military also contributes to its culture. Present-day culture includes many historical and tourist attractions, a thriving musical and theatrical scene, numerous notable special events, a varied cuisine, and a reputation as one of America's premier centers of craft brewing.

== Sports ==
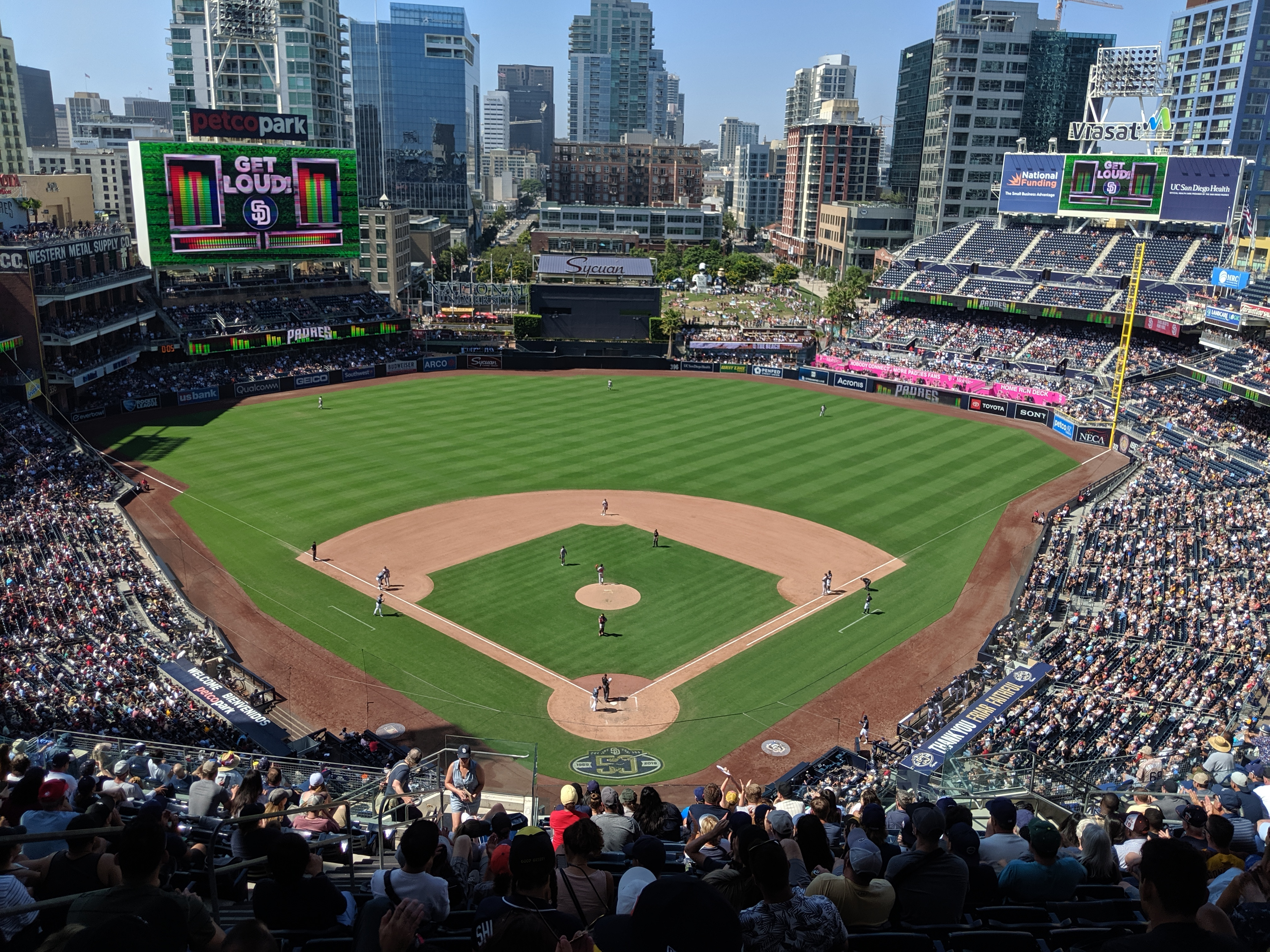
Petco Park, home of the San Diego Padres

Sports in San Diego County includes major professional league teams, other highest-level professional league teams, minor league teams, and college athletics. San Diego County hosts two teams of the major professional leagues, the San Diego Padres of Major League Baseball (MLB) and San Diego FC of Major League Soccer (MLS). The county is home to three universities whose teams compete in the National Collegiate Athletic Association's (NCAA) Division I. The Sentry, a professional golf tournament on the PGA Tour, is played annually at Torrey Pines Golf Course.

San Diego County hosted the National Football League's (NFL) San Diego Chargers from 1961 to 2017, when the team relocated to the Greater Los Angeles area (now the Los Angeles Chargers). The county also hosted the National Basketball Association's (NBA) San Diego Rockets from 1967 to 1971 (now the Houston Rockets) and San Diego Clippers from 1978 to 1984 (now the Los Angeles Clippers). San Diego County has never hosted a National Hockey League (NHL) franchise, though it hosted the San Diego Mariners of the now-defunct World Hockey Association (WHA) from 1974 to 1977.

Currently, there is no NBA, NFL, or NHL team in the county. San Diego is the largest American city not to have won a championship in a major professional league. The city does have one major league title to its name: the 1963 American Football League (AFL) Championship won by the San Diego Chargers, when the AFL was an independent entity prior to the AFL–NFL merger in 1970. Due to its lackluster record on winning professional championships, and in some cases retaining professional teams, some San Diego sports fans believe there is a curse on professional sports in the city.

== Government ==
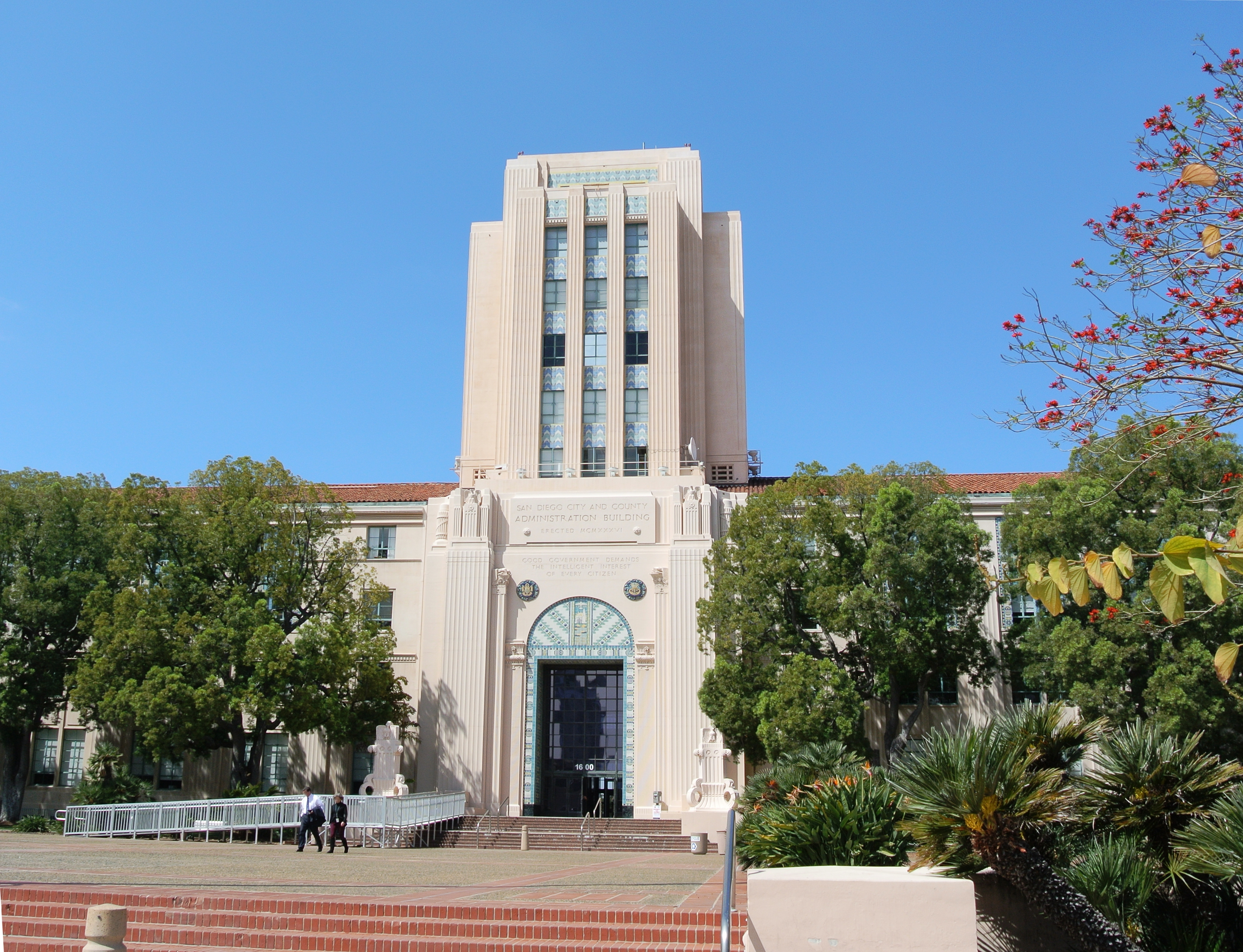
San Diego County Administration Center

The government of San Diego County is defined and authorized under the Constitution of California, California law, and the Charter of the County of San Diego. Much of the government of California is in practice the responsibility of county governments such as the government of San Diego County. The County government provides countywide services such as elections and voter registration, law enforcement, jails, vital records, property records, tax collection, public health, and social services. In addition the County serves as the local government for all unincorporated areas. Some chartered cities such as San Diego and Chula Vista provide municipal services such as police, public safety, libraries, parks and recreation, and zoning. Other cities such as Del Mar and Vista arrange to have the County provide some or all of these services on a contract basis.

The county government includes the elected five-member San Diego County Board of Supervisors, which operates in a legislative, executive, and quasi-judicial capacity. As a legislative authority, it can pass ordinances for the unincorporated areas (ordinances that affect the whole county, like posting of restaurant ratings, must be ratified by the individual city). As an executive body, it can tell the county departments what to do, and how to do it. As a quasi-judicial body, the Board is the final venue of appeal in the local planning process.

As of January 2025, the members of the San Diego County Board of Supervisors are:

District	Supervisor	Party
1	Paloma Aguirre (Chair Pro Tem)	Democratic
2	Joel Anderson	Republican
3	Terra Lawson-Remer (Chair)	Democratic
4	Monica Montgomery Steppe (Vice Chair)	Democratic
5	Jim Desmond	Republican

For several decades, ending in 2013, all five supervisors were Republican, white, graduates of San Diego State University, and had been in office since 1995 or earlier. The Board was criticized for this homogeneity, which was made possible because supervisors draw their own district lines and, until 2010, were not subject to term limits.) That pattern was broken in 2013 when Slater-Price retired; she was replaced by Democrat Dave Roberts, who won election to the seat in November 2012 and was inaugurated in January 2013.

The county government also has several other elected offices and officers, and numerous county departments and entities under the supervision of the Chief Administrative Officer such as the Probation Department. In addition, several entities of the government of California have jurisdiction conterminous with San Diego County, such as the San Diego Superior Court.

As of 2026, the elected county officials include:

Office	Official	Party
Clerk	Jordan Marks	Republican
District Attorney	Summer Stephan	Independent
Sheriff	Kelly Martinez	Democratic
Treasurer	Larry Cohen	Democratic

The San Diego County Code is the codified law of San Diego County in the form of ordinances passed by the Board of Supervisors. The Administrative Code establishes the powers and duties of all officers and the procedures and rules of operation of all departments.

The county motto is "The noblest motive is the public good." County government offices are housed in the historic County Administration Center Building, constructed in 1935–1938 with funding from the Works Progress Administration.

== Politics ==
San Diego County registered voters (2019)
Total population	3,338,330	
Registered voters	1,747,383	52.3%
Democratic	623,925	35.7%
Republican	475,149	27.2%
Democratic–Republican spread	+148,776	+8.5%
No party preference	552,538	31.6%
American Independent	55,800	3.2%
Libertarian	16,355	0.9%
Other	11,474	0.7%
Green	6,887	0.4%
Peace and Freedom	5,255	0.3%

=== Voting ===
With its prominent military presence, San Diego County historically has been a Republican Party stronghold, but in recent years it has come to favor the Democratic Party. The Republican presidential nominee carried the county in every election from 1948 through 2004, except in 1992, when Bill Clinton won a 37% plurality of the vote. In 2008, Barack Obama became the first Democratic presidential candidate to win a majority of votes in San Diego County since World War II. Democratic candidates continued to carry the county in 2012, 2016, 2020 and 2024. Joe Biden's 2020 margin of victory in the county, 22.8%, was the largest for a Democratic candidate since 1936, though it was narrower than Biden's statewide margin of 29.2%.

United States presidential election results for San Diego County, California (Note: The total for "Third party(ies)" in 1912 comprised 7,922 votes for Progressive Theodore Roosevelt (who was official Republican nominee in California), 2,873 votes for Socialist Eugene V. Debs and 1,139 votes for Prohibition Party nominee Eugene W. Chafin.)
Year	Republican		Democratic		Third party(ies)	
Year	No.	%	No.	%	No.	%
1880	743	56.80%	546	41.74%	19	1.45%
1884	1,120	57.00%	800	40.71%	45	2.29%
1888	4,661	56.88%	3,189	38.92%	344	4.20%
1892	3,525	45.71%	2,334	30.26%	1,853	24.03%
1896	3,631	46.86%	3,908	50.44%	209	2.70%
1900	3,800	54.91%	2,678	38.69%	443	6.40%
1904	4,303	59.52%	1,398	19.34%	1,529	21.15%
1908	5,412	57.56%	2,393	25.45%	1,598	16.99%
1912	63	0.29%	9,731	44.79%	11,934	54.92%
1916	16,978	46.47%	16,815	46.02%	2,744	7.51%
1920	19,826	63.78%	8,478	27.27%	2,783	8.95%
1924	22,726	48.99%	2,944	6.35%	20,721	44.67%
1928	47,769	67.14%	22,749	31.97%	633	0.89%
1932	35,305	41.46%	45,622	53.58%	4,223	4.96%
1936	35,686	35.04%	64,628	63.45%	1,540	1.51%
1940	55,434	43.27%	71,188	55.57%	1,488	1.16%
1944	75,746	45.42%	89,959	53.94%	1,059	0.64%
1948	101,552	49.43%	98,217	47.80%	5,690	2.77%
1952	186,091	63.50%	105,255	35.92%	1,688	0.58%
1956	195,742	64.47%	106,716	35.15%	1,147	0.38%
1960	223,056	56.41%	171,259	43.31%	1,106	0.28%
1964	214,445	50.31%	211,808	49.69%	33	0.01%
1968	261,540	56.26%	167,669	36.07%	35,654	7.67%
1972	371,627	61.82%	206,455	34.34%	23,055	3.84%
1976	353,302	55.74%	263,654	41.60%	16,839	2.66%
1980	435,910	60.81%	195,410	27.26%	85,546	11.93%
1984	502,344	65.30%	257,029	33.41%	9,894	1.29%
1988	523,143	60.19%	333,264	38.34%	12,788	1.47%
1992	352,125	35.69%	367,397	37.24%	267,124	27.07%
1996	402,876	45.57%	389,964	44.11%	91,311	10.33%
2000	475,736	49.63%	437,666	45.66%	45,232	4.72%
2004	596,033	52.45%	526,437	46.33%	13,874	1.22%
2008	541,032	43.95%	666,581	54.15%	23,434	1.90%
2012	536,726	45.02%	626,957	52.58%	28,599	2.40%
2016	477,766	36.57%	735,476	56.30%	93,158	7.13%
2020	600,094	37.46%	964,650	60.21%	37,399	2.33%
2024	593,270	40.14%	841,372	56.93%	43,386	2.94%

The city of San Diego itself is more Democratic than the county average and has largely voted Democrat in each presidential election since 1992; certain areas and cities within the county are swing areas and have split their votes in post-2000 elections. The county's Republican population gradually increases the further one travels away from downtown; the Republican strongholds include La Jolla, Coronado, the regions of North and East County, the eastern backlands, and remote mountain communities such as Julian. While these areas have traditionally voted Republican, all also contain varied electorates of Democrats, Libertarians, and independents.

A unique feature of the political scene is the use of Golden Hall, a convention facility next to San Diego's City Hall. The County Registrar of Voters rents the hall to distribute election results. Supporters and political observers gather to watch the results come in; supporters of the various candidates parade around the hall, carrying signs and chanting; candidates give their victory and concession speeches and host parties for campaign volunteers and donors at the site; and television stations broadcast live from the floor of the convention center. The atmosphere at Election Central on the evening of election day has been compared to the voting portion of a political party national convention.

On November 4, 2008, San Diego County voted 53.71% for Proposition 8, which amended the California Constitution, effectively placing a ban on same-sex marriages; this proposition would restore Proposition 22, which was overturned by a ruling from the California Supreme Court. However, the City of San Diego, along with the North County coastal cities of Del Mar, Encinitas, and Solana Beach voted against Proposition 8. La Mesa was a virtual tie for Prop. 8 support, while Carlsbad supported the referendum by only a 2% margin.

=== Federal and state representation ===
In the U.S. House of Representatives, San Diego County is split between five congressional districts:

- California's 48th congressional district, represented by Republican Darrell Issa
- California's 49th congressional district, represented by Democrat Mike Levin
- California's 50th congressional district, represented by Democrat Scott Peters
- California's 51st congressional district, represented by Democrat Sara Jacobs and
- California's 52nd congressional district, represented by Democrat Juan Vargas.

In the California State Assembly, San Diego County is split between seven legislative districts:

- the 74th Assembly district, represented by Republican Laurie Davies,
- the 75th Assembly district, represented by Republican Carl DeMaio,
- the 76th Assembly district, represented by Democrat Darshana Patel,
- the 77th Assembly district, represented by Democrat Tasha Boerner,
- the 78th Assembly district, represented by Democrat Chris Ward,
- the 79th Assembly district, represented by Democrat LaShae Sharp-Collins, and
- the 80th Assembly district, represented by Democrat David Alvarez.

In the California State Senate, San Diego County is split between five legislative districts:

- the 18th senatorial district, represented by Democrat Steve Padilla,
- the 32nd senatorial district, represented by Republican Kelly Seyarto
- the 38th senatorial district, represented by Democrat Catherine Blakespear,
- the 39th senatorial district, represented by Democrat Akilah Weber Pierson, and
- the 40th senatorial district, represented by Republican Brian Jones.

== Crime ==
The following table includes the number of incidents reported and the rate per 1,000 persons for each type of offense.

Population and crime rates
Population	3,060,849	
Violent crime	12,775	4.17
Homicide	75	0.02
Forcible rape	746	0.24
Robbery	4,033	1.32
Aggravated assault	7,921	2.59
Property crime	43,525	14.22
Burglary	14,522	4.74
Larceny-theft (Note: Only larceny-theft cases involving property over $400 in value are reported as property crimes.)	41,278	13.49
Motor vehicle theft	13,938	4.55
Arson	394	0.13

=== Cities by population and crime rates ===
Cities by population and crime rates
City	Population	Violent crimes	Violent crime rate per 1,000 persons	Property crimes	Property crime rate per 1,000 persons
Carlsbad	107,879	265	2.46	2,109	19.55
Chula Vista	249,830	581	2.33	5,081	20.34
Coronado	19,345	20	1.03	504	26.05
Del Mar	4,263	15	3.52	211	49.50
El Cajon	101,864	365	3.58	2,414	23.70
Encinitas	60,960	150	2.46	1,296	21.26
Escondido	147,386	628	4.26	3,887	26.37
Imperial Beach	26,956	147	5.45	471	17.47
La Mesa	58,444	224	3.83	1,732	29.64
Lemon Grove	25,932	137	5.28	434	16.74
National City	59,920	371	6.19	1,863	31.09
Oceanside	171,141	728	4.25	4,289	25.06
Poway	48,968	94	1.92	559	11.42
San Diego	1,338,477	5,529	4.13	31,700	23.68
San Marcos	85,810	227	2.65	1,502	17.50
Santee	54,700	154	2.82	1,109	20.27
Solana Beach	13,181	24	1.82	313	23.75
Vista	96,087	465	4.84	1,885	19.62

== Education ==
San Diego County contains three public state universities: University of California, San Diego (UC San Diego); San Diego State University (SDSU); and California State University, San Marcos (CSUSM). Major private universities in the county include University of San Diego (USD), Point Loma Nazarene University (PLNU), Alliant International University (AIU), and National University. It also includes three law schools, the USD School of Law, California Western School of Law, and the Thomas Jefferson School of Law.

Within the county there are 24 public elementary school districts, 6 high school districts, and 12 unified school districts. There are also five community college districts.

Several cities in the county maintain public library systems, including the city of San Diego itself. The San Diego County Library serves all other areas of the county. In 2010 the county library had 33 branches and two bookmobiles; circulated over 10.7 million books, CDs, DVDs, and other material formats; recorded 5.7 million visits to library branches; and hosted 21,132 free programs and events. The San Diego County Library is one of the 25 busiest libraries in the nation as measured by materials circulated.

=== Community College Districts ===
- Grossmont–Cuyamaca Community College District
- MiraCosta Community College District
- Palomar Community College District
- San Diego Community College District
- Southwestern Community College District

=== K-12 schools ===
School districts

K-12 unified:

- Borrego Springs Unified School District
- Bonsall Unified School District
- Carlsbad Unified School District
- Coronado Unified School District
- Mountain Empire Unified School District
- Oceanside Unified School District
- Poway Unified School District
- Ramona Unified School District
- San Diego Unified School District
- San Marcos Unified School District
- Vista Unified School District
- Valley Center-Pauma Unified School District
- Warner Unified School District

Secondary:

- Escondido Union High School District
- Fallbrook Union High School District
- Grossmont Union High School District
- Julian Union High School District
- San Dieguito Union High School District
- Sweetwater Union High School District

Elementary:

  - Alpine Union Elementary School District
  - Cajon Valley Union Elementary School District
  - Cardiff Elementary School District
  - Chula Vista Elementary School District
  - Dehesa Elementary School District
  - Del Mar Union Elementary School District
  - Encinitas Union Elementary School District
  - Escondido Union Elementary School District
  - Fallbrook Union Elementary School District
  - Jamul-Dulzura Union Elementary School District
  - Julian Union Elementary School District
  - La Mesa-Spring Valley School District
  - Lakeside Union School District
  - Lemon Grove Elementary School District
  - National Elementary School District
  - Rancho Santa Fe Elementary School District
  - San Pasqual Union Elementary School District
  - San Ysidro Elementary School District
  - Santee School District
  - Solana Beach Elementary School District
  - South Bay Union School District
  - Spencer Valley Elementary School District
  - Vallecitos Elementary School District

== Military ==
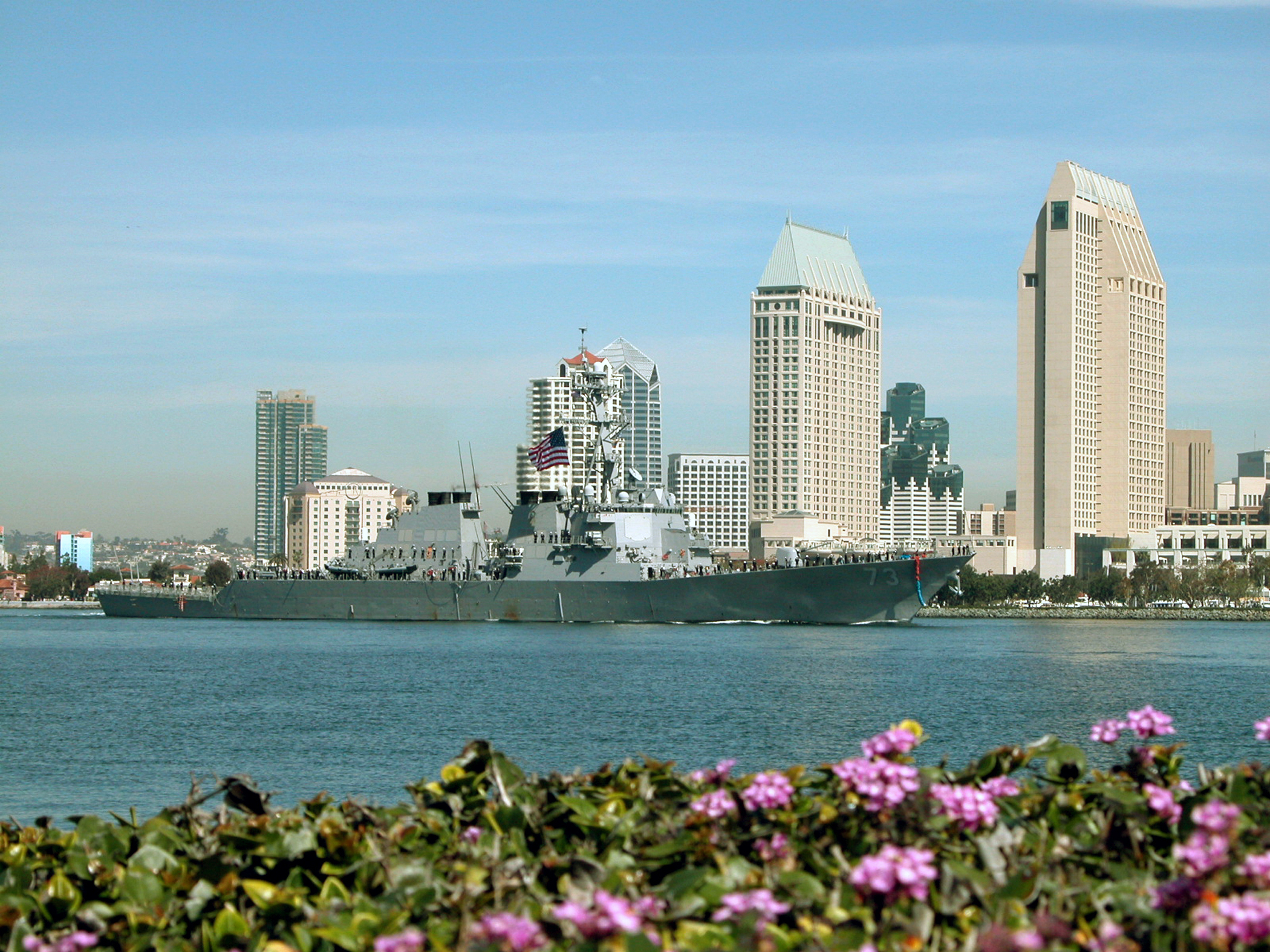
USS Decatur (DDG-73)

San Diego is the headquarters of the U.S. Navy's Eleventh Naval District and is the Navy's principal location for West Coast and Pacific Ocean operations. Naval Base San Diego is principal home to the Pacific Fleet (although the headquarters is located in Pearl Harbor). NAS North Island is located on the north side of Coronado, and is home to Headquarters for Naval Air Forces and Naval Air Force Pacific, the bulk of the Pacific Fleet's helicopter squadrons, and part of the West Coast aircraft carrier fleet.

The Naval Special Warfare Center is the primary training center for SEALs, and is also located on Coronado. The area contains five major naval bases and the U.S. Marines base Camp Pendleton. Marine Corps Base Camp Pendleton is the major West Coast base of the United States Marine Corps and serves as its prime amphibious training base. It is located on the Southern California coast, bordered by Oceanside to the south, San Clemente to the north, and Fallbrook to the east.

=== U.S. Navy ===
- Naval Base San Diego, also known as 32nd Street Naval Station
- Naval Amphibious Base Coronado
- Naval Air Station North Island
- Naval Base Point Loma, which includes the Submarine Base and the Fleet Antisubmarine Warfare Training Center
- Naval Information Warfare Systems Command (NAVWAR)
- Naval Medical Center San Diego, also known as Bob Wilson Naval Hospital and Balboa Naval Hospital

=== U.S. Marine Corps ===
- Marine Corps Base Camp Pendleton
- Marine Corps Air Station Miramar
- Marine Corps Recruit Depot San Diego

=== U.S. Coast Guard ===
- Coast Guard Air Station San Diego

=== U.S. Air Force ===
- San Diego Air National Guard Station, which is home to the 147th Combat Communications Squadron.

== Media ==
San Diego County is primarily served by media in San Diego, including TV and radio stations based in the city. It comprises the entire San Diego media market.

=== Newspapers ===
San Diego County is served by many newspapers. The major regional paper is The San Diego Union-Tribune, also known as U-T San Diego or just "The U-T" by locals, is ranked 23rd in the country (by daily circulation) as of March 2013. The Union-Tribune serves both San Diego County and neighboring Imperial County. The former North County Times, based in Escondido and serving portions of Riverside County and North County, was purchased by the Union-Tribune in 2012 and closed down. For about a year after absorbing the North County Times the Union-Tribune published a North County edition, but the regional edition was later abandoned. The Los Angeles Times is also delivered in portions of the county. Many of the area's cities, towns and neighborhoods have their own local newspapers, such as the Coronado Eagle; the Union-Tribune acquired eight local weekly publications in 2013 and has continued to publish them as independent local newspapers, including the La Jolla Light. The San Diego Daily Transcript reports business and legal news. Privately-published papers, like the Military Press Newspaper and the Navy Dispatch, serve the military community both on and off base.

=== Other media ===
County Television Network is a public-access television cable channel, offering a "hometown blend of C-SPAN, the Lifetime, History, Travel, and Discovery channels" for the county, and funded by fees paid by cable companies.

== Transportation ==
=== Major highways ===
- I-5
- I-8
- I-15 / SR 15
- I-805
- SR 11
- SR 52
- SR 54
- SR 56
- SR 67
- SR 75
- SR 76
- SR 78
- SR 79
- SR 94
- SR 125
- SR 163
- SR 188
- SR 282
- SR 905

=== Border crossings to Mexico ===
- San Ysidro Port of Entry
- Otay Mesa Port of Entry
- Otay Mesa East Port of Entry (projected opening 2028)
- Tecate Port of Entry

=== Railroads ===
- (Amtrak) Pacific Surfliner
- Coaster
- Metrolink
- San Diego and Arizona Eastern Railway
- San Diego and Imperial Valley Railroad

=== Light rail and local transit ===
- San Diego Trolley
- San Diego Metropolitan Transit System (MTS)
- Sprinter
- North County Transit District (NCTD)

=== The Port of San Diego ===
- Embarcadero

=== Airports ===
==== Carlsbad ====
- McClellan–Palomar Airport (CRQ)

==== El Cajon ====
- Gillespie Field (SEE)

==== Oceanside ====
- Oceanside Municipal Airport (OKB)

==== City of San Diego ====
- San Diego International Airport (SAN)
- Montgomery-Gibbs Executive Airport (MYF)
- Brown Field Municipal Airport (SDM)

==== Unincorporated San Diego County ====
- Agua Caliente Airport (L54)
- Borrego Valley Airport (L08)
- Fallbrook Community Airpark (L18)
- Jacumba Airport (L78)
- Ocotillo Airport (L90)
- Ramona Airport (RNM)

== Communities ==
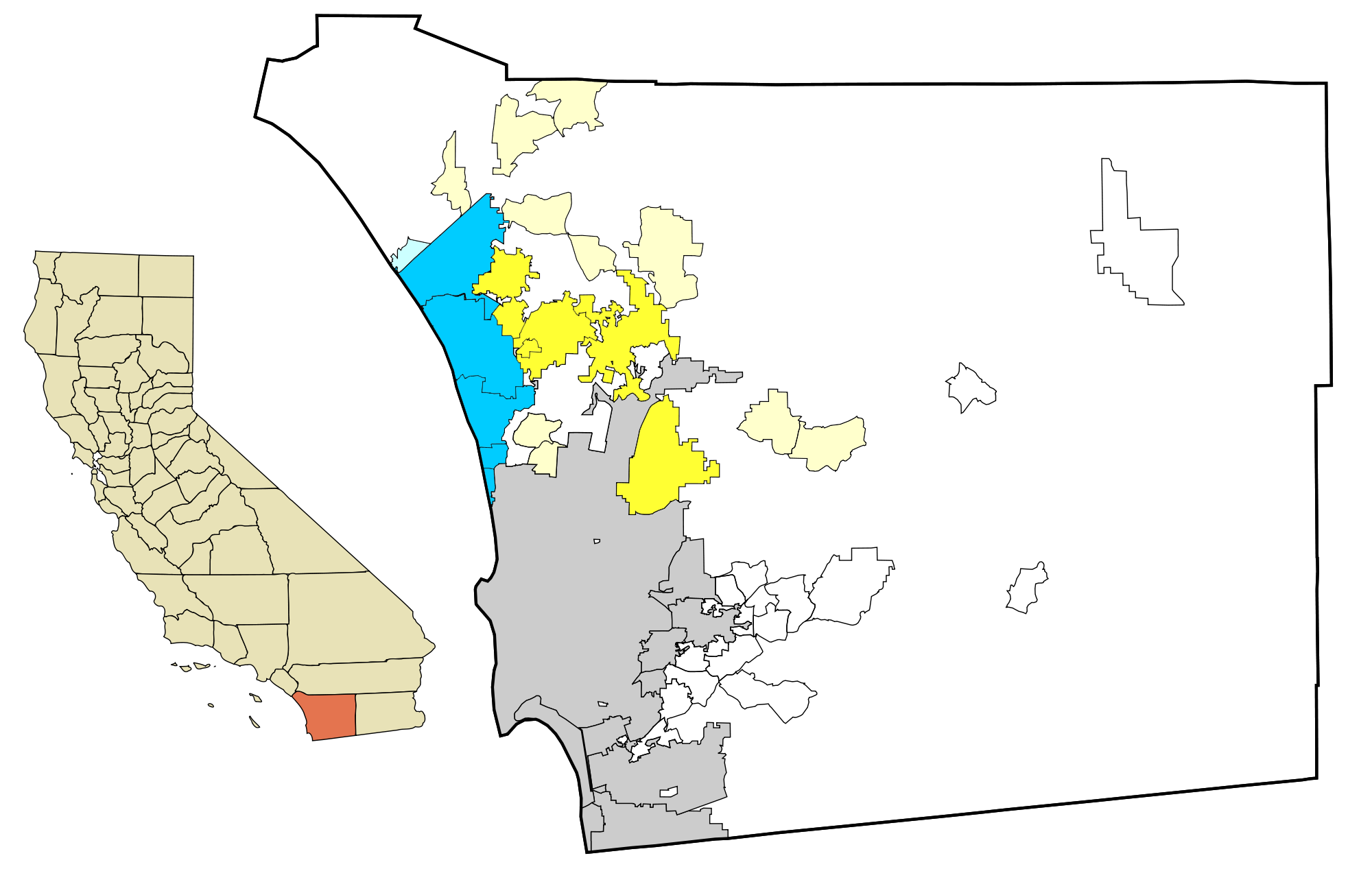
North County communities. Coastal cities are in dark blue, unincorporated coastal community is in light blue. Inland cities are in dark yellow, unincorporated inland communities are in light yellow. Parts of northern San Diego city are sometimes also considered part of North County

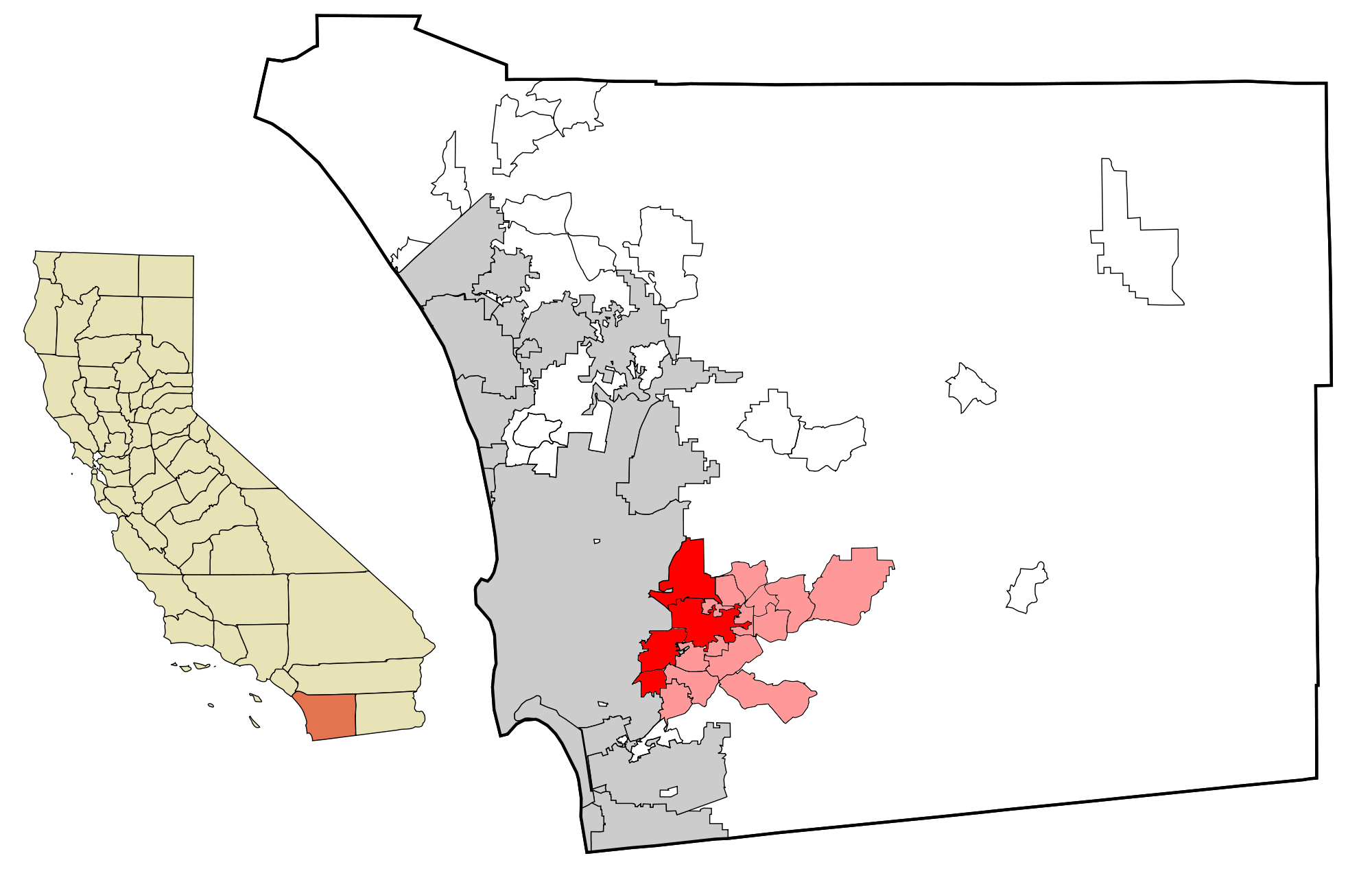
East County communities in red. In dark red are the cities of El Cajon, La Mesa, Lemon Grove, and Santee, which mark the western edge of East County. Unincorporated communities are in light red, including Alpine, Jamul, Lakeside, and Spring Valley

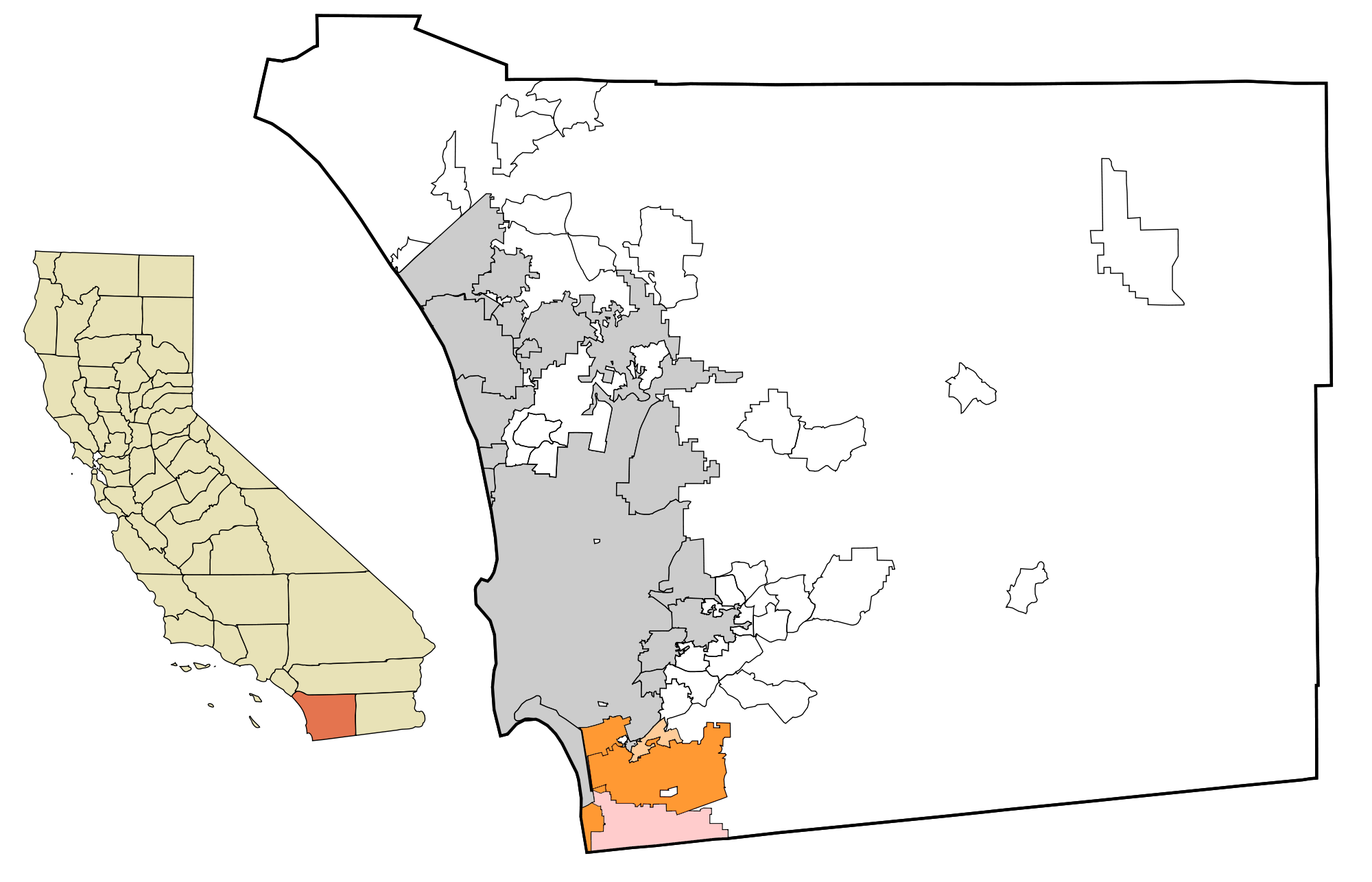
South Bay communities. The cities of Chula Vista, Imperial Beach and National City are in dark orange. The unincorporated community of Bonita is in light orange. San Ysidro and Otay Mesa, neighborhoods of the city of San Diego, are in pink.

As of the 2020 census, San Diego County includes 18 incorporated cities, 18 Indian reservations, and 39 census-designated places.

=== Cities ===
City	Date incorporated	Population (2020 Census)
Carlsbad	July 16, 1952	114,746
Chula Vista	November 28, 1911	275,487
Coronado	December 11, 1890	20,192
Del Mar	July 15, 1959	3,954
El Cajon	Nov 12, 1912	106,215
Encinitas	October 1, 1986	62,007
Escondido	October 8, 1888	151,038
Imperial Beach	July 18, 1956	26,137
La Mesa	February 16, 1912	61,121
Lemon Grove	July 1, 1977	27,627
National City	September 17, 1887	56,173
Oceanside	July 3, 1888	174,068
Poway	December 1, 1980	48,841
San Diego (county seat)	March 27, 1850	1,386,932
San Marcos	January 28, 1963	94,833
Santee	December 1, 1980	60,037
Solana Beach	July 1, 1986	12,941
Vista	January 28, 1963	98,381

=== Census-designated places (CDPs) ===
- Alpine
- Bonita
- Bonsall
- Borrego Springs
- Bostonia
- Boulevard
- Campo
- Camp Pendleton Mainside
- Camp Pendleton South
- Casa de Oro-Mount Helix
- Crest
- Del Dios
- Descanso
- Elfin Forest
- Eucalyptus Hills
- Fairbanks Ranch
- Fallbrook
- Granite Hills
- Harbison Canyon
- Harmony Grove
- Hidden Meadows
- Jacumba Hot Springs
- Jamul
- Julian
- Lake San Marcos
- Lakeside
- La Presa
- Mount Laguna
- Pala
- Pine Valley
- Potrero
- Rainbow
- Ramona
- Rancho San Diego
- Rancho Santa Fe
- San Diego Country Estates
- Spring Valley
- Valley Center
- Winter Gardens

=== Unincorporated communities ===
- 4S Ranch
- Agua Caliente Springs
- Ballena
- Banner
- Casa de Oro
- Cuyamaca
- De Luz
- De Luz Heights
- Dehesa
- Dulzura
- East Otay Mesa
- Flinn Springs
- Foster
- Guatay
- Jesmond Dene
- Jofegan
- Kentwood-In-The-Pines
- Lake Henshaw
- Lincoln Acres
- Manzanita
- Morena Village
- Mount Helix
- Oak Grove
- Ocotillo Wells
- Pala Mesa
- Palomar Mountain
- Pauma Valley
- Pine Hills
- Ranchita
- Rincon
- San Felipe
- Santa Ysabel
- Shelter Valley
- Tecate
- Warner Springs
- Wynola

=== Indian reservations ===
San Diego County has 18 federally recognized Indian reservations, more than any other county in the United States. Although they are typical in size to other Indian reservations in California (many of which are termed "Rancherías"), they are relatively small by national standards, and all together total 200.2 sq mi (519 km^{2}) of area.

- Barona Indian Reservation
- Campo Indian Reservation
- Capitan Grande Reservation
- Ewiiaapaayp Indian Reservation
- Inaja and Cosmit Indian Reservation
- Jamul Indian Village
- La Jolla Indian Reservation
- La Posta Indian Reservation
- Los Coyotes Indian Reservation
- Manzanita Indian Reservation
- Mesa Grande Indian Reservation
- Pala Indian Reservation
- Pauma and Yuima Indian Reservation
- Rincon Indian Reservation
- San Pasqual Indian Reservation
- Santa Ysabel Indian Reservation
- Sycuan Indian Reservation
- Viejas Indian Reservation

=== Population ranking ===
The population ranking of the following table is based on the 2020 census of San Diego County.

† county seat

Rank	City/Town/etc.	Municipal type	Population (2020 Census)	Population (2010 Census)
1	San Diego †	City	1,386,932	1,307,402
2	Chula Vista	City	275,487	243,916
3	Oceanside	City	174,068	167,086
4	Escondido	City	151,038	143,911
5	Carlsbad	City	114,746	105,328
6	El Cajon	City	106,215	99,478
7	Vista	City	98,381	93,834
8	San Marcos	City	94,833	83,781
9	Encinitas	City	62,007	59,518
10	La Mesa	City	61,121	57,065
11	Santee	City	60,037	53,413
12	National City	City	56,173	58,582
13	Poway	City	48,841	47,811
14	La Presa	CDP	35,033	34,169
15	Fallbrook	CDP	32,267	30,534
16	Spring Valley	CDP	30,998	28,205
17	Lemon Grove	City	27,627	25,320
18	Imperial Beach	City	26,137	26,324
19	Winter Gardens	CDP	22,380	20,631
20	Rancho San Diego	CDP	21,858	21,208
21	Ramona	CDP	21,468	20,292
22	Lakeside	CDP	21,152	20,648
23	Coronado	City	20,192	18,912
24	Casa de Oro-Mount Helix	CDP	19,576	18,762
25	Bostonia	CDP	16,882	15,379
26	Alpine	CDP	14,696	14,236
27	Solana Beach	City	12,941	12,867
28	Bonita	CDP	12,917	12,538
29	Camp Pendleton South	CDP	12,468	10,616
30	San Diego Country Estates	CDP	10,395	10,109
31	Valley Center	CDP	10,087	9,277
32	Camp Pendleton Mainside	CDP	9,683	5,200
33	Jamul	CDP	6,179	6,163
34	Eucalyptus Hills	CDP	5,517	5,313
35	Lake San Marcos	CDP	5,328	4,437
36	Bonsall	CDP	4,546	3,982
37	Hidden Meadows	CDP	4,484	3,485
38	Harbison Canyon	CDP	4,048	3,841
39	Del Mar	City	3,954	4,161
40	Granite Hills	CDP	3,267	3,035
41	Rancho Santa Fe	CDP	3,156	3,117
42	Borrego Springs	CDP	3,073	3,429
43	Fairbanks Ranch	CDP	3,002	3,148
44	Campo	CDP	2,955	2,684
45	Crest	CDP	2,828	2,593
46	Harmony Grove	CDP	2,079	N/A
47	Rainbow	CDP	1,884	1,832
48	Julian	CDP	1,768	1,502
49	Pine Valley	CDP	1,645	1,510
50	Pala Indian Reservation	AIAN	1,541	1,315
51	Descanso	CDP	1,499	1,423
52	Pala	CDP	1,490	N/A
53	San Pasqual Reservation	AIAN	1,270	1,097
54	Rincon Reservation	AIAN	1,095	1,215
55	Barona Reservation	AIAN	756	640
56	Potrero	CDP	648	656
57	Elfin Forest	CDP	600	N/A
58	Jacumba	CDP	540	561
59	Viejas Reservation	AIAN	538	520
60	Campo Indian Reservation	AIAN	398	362
61	Del Dios	CDP	396	N/A
62	Boulevard	CDP	359	315
63	Santa Ysabel Reservation	AIAN	263	330
64	Sycuan Reservation	AIAN	218	211
65	Pauma and Yuima Reservation	AIAN	179	206
66	La Jolla Reservation	AIAN	145	476
67	Manzanita Reservation	AIAN	101	78
68	Mesa Grande Reservation	AIAN	87	98
69	Mount Laguna	CDP	74	57
70	La Posta Indian Reservation	AIAN	50	55
71	Los Coyotes Reservation	AIAN	15	98
72	Ewiiaapaayp Reservation	AIAN	5	N/A
	Capitan Grande Reservation	AIAN	0	0
	Inaja and Cosmit Reservation	AIAN	0	0
	Jamul Indian Village	AIAN	0	N/A

=== Former cities ===
City	Year incorporated	Year removed	Fate
East San Diego	1912	1923	Merged into San Diego
Elsinore (now Lake Elsinore)	1888	1893	Riverside County formed
Imperial	1904	1907	Imperial County formed
Riverside	1883	1893	Riverside County formed
San Jacinto	1888	1893	Riverside County formed

=== Future and past incorporation efforts ===
The communities of Del Dios, Elfin Forest, Harmony Grove, and Pala were newly-designated as CDPs in the 2020 census.

Some CDPs and unincorporated communities of San Diego County have explored incorporating as cities/towns in the past (California makes no legal distinction between the titles of "city" and "town", allowing communities that incorporate to choose their designation, though there has never been an incorporated town in San Diego County). Alpine, Bonita, Fallbrook, Lakeside, Ramona, Rancho Santa Fe and Spring Valley have each been tied to various incorporation studies, organized efforts and discussions in the past. Some of these past efforts have culminated in ballot initiatives. Voters in Fallbrook previously rejected incorporation in 1981 and 1987. Rancho Santa Fe residents also rejected incorporation in 1987. Among the existing cities of San Diego County, some had multiple failed incorporation efforts before ultimately succeeding in becoming a city. Lemon Grove, for example, saw incorporation measures fail in 1955, 1958 and 1964 before a successful incorporation vote in 1977. Other cities have seen incorporation success thanks to mergers of neighboring unincorporated communities. Encinitas, for example, became an incorporated city through a consolidated effort between the then-unincorporated communities of Cardiff-by-the-Sea, Leucadia, Encinitas and Olivenhain in 1986. Encinitas and Solana Beach in 1986 are the most recent examples of successful campaigns for incorporation within the County of San Diego.

== See also ==
- List of breweries in San Diego County, California
- List of films shot in San Diego
- List of high schools in San Diego County, California
- List of media set in San Diego County, California
- List of museums in San Diego County, California
- List of school districts in San Diego County, California
- List of United States counties and county-equivalents
- National Register of Historic Places listings in San Diego County, California
- San Diego Association of Governments (SANDAG)
