= Harmony Grove, California =

- Unincorporated community Census designated place
- Location within California
- Coordinates: 33°6′2.58″N 117°8′16.77″W
- Country: United States
- State: California
- County: San Diego

Area
  - Total: 3.081 sq mi (7.98 km^{2})
  - Land: 3.081 sq mi (7.98 km^{2})
  - Water: 0 sq mi (0 km^{2})
- Elevation: 719 ft (219 m)

Population (2020)
  - Total: 2,079
  - Density: 674.8/sq mi (260.5/km^{2})
- Time zone: UTC-8 (PST)
  - Summer (DST): UTC-7 (PDT)
- GNIS feature ID: 2813413

Harmony Grove is an unincorporated community and census-designated place (CDP) in San Diego County, California, United States. Per the 2020 census, the population was 2,079.

== Demographics ==
Historical population
Census	Pop.	Note	%±
2020	2,079		—
U.S. Decennial Census; 2020

Harmony Grove first appeared as a CDP in the 2020 census.

=== 2020 census ===
As of the 2020 census, Harmony Grove had a population of 2,079. The median age was 34.3 years. 29.2% of residents were under the age of 18 and 7.0% of residents were 65 years of age or older. For every 100 females there were 102.0 males, and for every 100 females age 18 and over there were 97.7 males age 18 and over.

91.0% of residents lived in urban areas, while 9.0% lived in rural areas.

There were 650 households in Harmony Grove, of which 48.0% had children under the age of 18 living in them. Of all households, 77.1% were married-couple households, 11.7% were households with a male householder and no spouse or partner present, and 7.1% were households with a female householder and no spouse or partner present. About 9.7% of all households were made up of individuals and 3.2% had someone living alone who was 65 years of age or older.

There were 703 housing units, of which 7.5% were vacant. The homeowner vacancy rate was 3.0% and the rental vacancy rate was 16.7%.

Harmony Grove, California – Racial and ethnic composition Note: the US Census treats Hispanic/Latino as an ethnic category. This table excludes Latinos from the racial categories and assigns them to a separate category. Hispanics/Latinos may be of any race.
Race / Ethnicity (NH = Non-Hispanic)	Pop 2020	% 2020
White alone (NH)	1,087	52.28%
Black or African American alone (NH)	58	2.79%
Native American or Alaska Native alone (NH)	4	0.19%
Asian alone (NH)	427	20.54%
Native Hawaiian or Pacific Islander alone (NH)	2	0.10%
Other race alone (NH)	18	0.87%
Mixed race or Multiracial (NH)	155	7.46%
Hispanic or Latino (any race)	328	15.78%
Total	2,079	100.00%

== Education ==
The CDP is in Escondido Union Elementary School District and Escondido Union High School District.
