= Marys Grove =

Forest located in San Diego County, USA

- Interactive map of Marys Grove
- Location: California, United States

Marys Grove is a forest in the United States. Marys Grove is located in San Diego County and the state of California, in the southwestern part of the country, 3,600 km west of the capital Washington, D.C.

== Climate ==
Marys Grove has a Mediterranean climate. The average temperature is 26 °C. The hottest month is July, at 38 °C, and the coldest is December, at 13 °C. The average rainfall is 255 millimetres per year. The wettest month is December, at 55 millimetres of rain, and the driest is June, at 1 millimetre.

Marys Grove

Climate chart (precipitation, max. and min. temperature)
J	F	M	A	M	J	J	A	S	O	N	D
25 21 7	36 24 6	37 31 13	21 38 14	4 45 21	1 45 25	11 47 28	15 43 27	19 46 24	8 37 17	23 28 9	55 19 7
- █ Average max. and min. temperatures in °C
- █ Precipitation totals in mm
Imperial conversion
J	F	M	A	M	J	J	A	S	O	N	D
1 70 45	1.4 75 43	1.5 88 55	0.8 100 57	0.2 113 70	0 113 77	0.4 117 82	0.6 109 81	0.7 115 75	0.3 99 63	0.9 82 48	2.2 66 45
- █ Average max. and min. temperatures in °F
- █ Precipitation totals in inches
