= Hidden Meadows, California =

Hidden Meadows
- Census designated place
- Location in San Diego County and the state of California

- Location in the United States
- Coordinates: 33°13′46″N 117°7′29″W
- Country: United States
- State: California
- County: San Diego

Area
  - Total: 6.583 sq mi (17.049 km^{2})
  - Land: 6.583 sq mi (17.049 km^{2})
  - Water: 0 sq mi (0 km^{2}) 0%
- Elevation: 1,496 ft (456 m)

Population (2020)
  - Total: 4,484
  - Density: 681.2/sq mi (263.0/km^{2})
- Time zone: UTC-8 (Pacific)
  - Summer (DST): UTC-7 (PDT)
- ZIP code: 92026
- Area codes: 442/760
- FIPS code: 06-33532
- GNIS feature ID: 1867027

Hidden Meadows is a census-designated place (CDP) near Escondido in San Diego County, California. The population was 4,484 at the 2020 census, up from 3,485 at the 2010 census.

== Geography ==
Hidden Meadows is located at 33°13′46″N 117°7′29″W (33.229571, -117.124754).

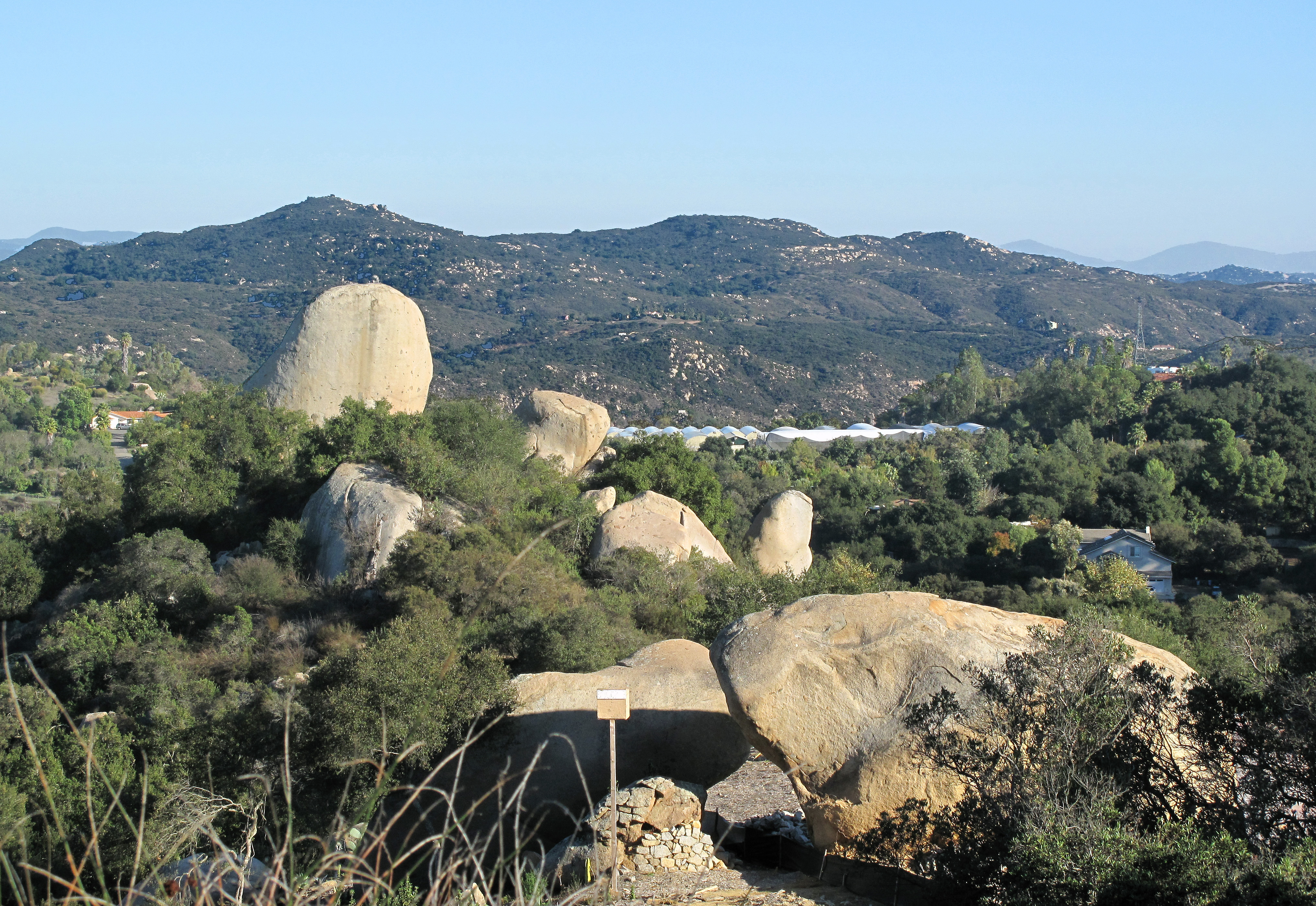
Typical rock formation in Hidden Meadows

According to the United States Census Bureau, the Hidden Meadows census-designated place (CDP) has a total area of 6.6 square miles (17 km^{2}), all land.

== Demographics ==
Historical population
Census	Pop.	Note	%±
1990	2,371		—
2000	3,463		46.1%
2010	3,485		0.6%
2020	4,484		28.7%
U.S. Decennial Census; 1860–1870 1880-1890; 1900 1910 1920; 1930 1940 1950; 1960 1970 1980; 1990 2000 2010; 2020

Hidden Meadows was first listed as a census designated place in the 1990 U.S. census.

=== Racial and ethnic composition ===
Hidden Meadows CDP, California – Racial and ethnic composition Note: the US Census treats Hispanic/Latino as an ethnic category. This table excludes Latinos from the racial categories and assigns them to a separate category. Hispanics/Latinos may be of any race.
Race / Ethnicity (NH = Non-Hispanic)	Pop 2000	Pop 2010	Pop 2020	% 2000	% 2010	% 2020
White alone (NH)	3,098	2,668	3,176	89.46%	76.56%	70.83%
Black or African American alone (NH)	31	65	81	0.90%	1.87%	1.81%
Native American or Alaska Native alone (NH)	9	6	13	0.26%	0.17%	0.29%
Asian alone (NH)	59	316	343	1.70%	9.07%	7.65%
Native Hawaiian or Pacific Islander alone (NH)	4	5	5	0.12%	0.14%	0.11%
Other race alone (NH)	6	3	16	0.17%	0.09%	0.36%
Mixed race or Multiracial (NH)	53	93	256	1.53%	2.67%	5.71%
Hispanic or Latino (any race)	203	329	594	5.86%	9.44%	13.25%
Total	3,463	3,485	4,484	100.00%	100.00%	100.00%

=== 2020 census ===
As of the 2020 census, Hidden Meadows had a population of 4,484 and a population density of 680.7 inhabitants per square mile (262.8/km^{2}).

The census reported that 99.7% of the population lived in households, 0.3% lived in non-institutionalized group quarters, and no one was institutionalized. 81.5% of residents lived in urban areas, while 18.5% lived in rural areas.

There were 1,939 households, out of which 16.8% included children under the age of 18, 62.6% were married-couple households, 4.7% were cohabiting couple households, 19.8% had a female householder with no partner present, and 12.9% had a male householder with no partner present. 24.0% of households were one person, and 16.6% were one person aged 65 or older. The average household size was 2.31. There were 1,374 families (70.9% of all households).

The age distribution was 12.7% under the age of 18, 4.8% aged 18 to 24, 15.7% aged 25 to 44, 30.5% aged 45 to 64, and 36.3% who were 65 years of age or older. The median age was 57.8 years. For every 100 females, there were 95.0 males, and for every 100 females age 18 and over, there were 94.1 males age 18 and over.

There were 2,245 housing units at an average density of 340.8 units per square mile (131.6 units/km^{2}), of which 1,939 (86.4%) were occupied. Of these, 89.3% were owner-occupied, and 10.7% were occupied by renters. The homeowner vacancy rate was 10.2%, and the rental vacancy rate was 1.0%.

=== Income and poverty ===
In 2023, the US Census Bureau estimated that the median household income was $119,394, and the per capita income was $70,672. About 4.6% of families and 7.7% of the population were below the poverty line.

=== 2010 census ===
The 2010 United States census reported that Hidden Meadows had a population of 3,485. The population density was 529.4 inhabitants per square mile (204.4/km^{2}). The racial makeup of Hidden Meadows was 2,865 (82.2%) White, 66 (1.9%) African American, 11 (0.3%) Native American, 318 (9.1%) Asian, 6 (0.2%) Pacific Islander, 93 (2.7%) from other races, and 126 (3.6%) from two or more races. Hispanic or Latino of any race were 329 persons (9.4%).

The Census reported that 3,470 people (99.6% of the population) lived in households, 15 (0.4%) lived in non-institutionalized group quarters, and 0 (0%) were institutionalized.

There were 1,397 households, out of which 279 (20.0%) had children under the age of 18 living in them, 983 (70.4%) were opposite-sex married couples living together, 49 (3.5%) had a female householder with no husband present, 49 (3.5%) had a male householder with no wife present. There were 53 (3.8%) unmarried opposite-sex partnerships, and 15 (1.1%) same-sex married couples or partnerships. 249 households (17.8%) were made up of individuals, and 129 (9.2%) had someone living alone who was 65 years of age or older. The average household size was 2.48. There were 1,081 families (77.4% of all households); the average family size was 2.78.

The population age distribution is 523 people (15.0%) under the age of 18, 209 people (6.0%) aged 18 to 24, 565 people (16.2%) aged 25 to 44, 1,312 people (37.6%) aged 45 to 64, and 876 people (25.1%) who were 65 years of age or older. The median age was 52.7 years. For every 100 females, there were 97.5 males. For every 100 females age 18 and over, there were 97.5 males.

There were 1,586 housing units at an average density of 240.9 per square mile (93.0/km^{2}), of which 1,234 (88.3%) were owner-occupied, and 163 (11.7%) were occupied by renters. The homeowner vacancy rate was 2.6%; the rental vacancy rate was 7.9%. 3,067 people (88.0% of the population) lived in owner-occupied housing units and 403 people (11.6%) lived in rental housing units.

== Government ==
In the California State Legislature, Hidden Meadows is in the 40th senatorial district, represented by Republican Brian Jones, and in the 75th Assembly district, represented by Republican Carl DeMaio.

In the United States House of Representatives, Hidden Meadows is in California's 50th congressional district, represented by Democrat Scott Peters.

== Education ==
Part of it is in Escondido Union School District and Escondido Union High School District. Another part is in Valley Center-Pauma Unified School District.
