= Escondido Union High School District =

School district in San Diego County, California

Escondido Union High School District (EUHSD) is a public secondary-education district in northern San Diego County, California, serving approximately 12,000 students in grades 9–12 across four comprehensive high schools (Escondido, Orange Glen, San Pasqual and Del Lago) and an adult education campus. It is headquartered in Escondido and includes almost all of Escondido, portions of San Diego, the Harmony Grove census-designated place, and portions of the Elfin Forest and Hidden Meadows CDPs. It has two feeder school districts: Escondido Union Elementary School District and San Pasqual Union Elementary School District.

Governed by a five-member elected board of trustees and led a superintendent, EUHSD provides college preparatory, career technical and special-education programs. Established in 1894 in a former Methodist seminary, the district has grown in tandem with the Escondido region and, following voter approval of Proposition E in 2014, completed major facility modernizations and safety upgrades.

== History ==
The district was established in 1894. Its first high school classes were held in a former Methodist seminary building constructed by the University of Southern California in 1889; the seminary closed for financial reasons in 1899, and the building was donated to the newly established Escondido Union High School District.

In the wake of the 1933 Long Beach earthquake, the California Field Act’s safety requirements led state inspectors to declare the downtown campus unsafe; the district vacated that site and completed a new North Broadway campus in 1954. Orange Glen High School, the district’s second comprehensive campus, opened in 1962 on the city’s east side to serve students living beyond Escondido’s original boundaries.

San Pasqual High School opened in 1972 to accommodate continued population growth; that same year the annual ‘Battle of the Bear’ football rivalry with Orange Glen began.

In November 2014, voters approved Proposition E, a $182.1 million general obligation bond to modernize classrooms, enhance safety, and upgrade technology infrastructure across the district.

Recent superintendents:

- Steve Boyle was superintendent until 2019, when he retired.
- Anne Staffieri became the superintendent in 2019. In 2023 she left to become the superintendent of the San Dieguito Union High School District.
- Jon Petersen became the superintendent in 2023. Petersen was previously the president of the board of trustees.

== Schools ==
- Escondido High School
- Orange Glen High School
- San Pasqual High School

Alternative:

- Del Lago Academy
- Escondido Adult School
- Valley High School
