= Escondido Union School District =

School district in California, United States

Address
- 2310 Aldergrove Avenue Escondido, California, 92029; United States

District information
- Type: Public
- Grades: K–8
- NCES District ID: 0612880

Students and staff
- Students: 14,197
- Teachers: 747.41 (FTE)
- Staff: 936.22 (FTE)
- Student–teacher ratio: 18.99

Other information
- Website: www.eusd.org

Escondido Union School District (EUSD) is a school district based in Escondido, California. The district serves over 17,000 elementary and middle school students with a student to teacher ratio of 19.6 to 1. The district contains 5 middle schools, 17 elementary schools, and one specialty school.

The district includes most of Escondido, portions of San Diego, the Harmony Grove census-designated place, and portions of the Elfin Forest and Hidden Meadows CDPs. The district feeds into Escondido Union High School District (EUHSD).

== Schools ==
=== Alternative high school ===
- Center City High School

=== Middle schools ===
- Del Dios Academy of Arts and Sciences
- Hidden Valley Middle School
- Rincon Middle School
- Quantum Academy
- Mission Middle School
- Bear Valley Middle School

=== Elementary schools ===
- Bernardo Elementary School
- Central Elementary School
- Conway Elementary School
- Farr Avenue Elementary School
- Felicita Elementary School
- Glen View Elementary School
- Juniper Elementary School
- Lincoln Elementary School
- L.R. Green Elementary School
- Miller Elementary School
- North Broadway Elementary School
- Oak Hill Elementary School
- Orange Glen Elementary School
- Pioneer Elementary School
- Reidy Creek Elementary School
- Rock Springs Elementary School
- Rose Elementary School

=== Specialty schools ===
- Quantum Academy (4th–8th grade)
- Limitless Learning Academy (K-8)
