= Demographics of San Diego County, California =

The demographics of San Diego County include a diverse people by race, ethnicity, and nationality. Half of the population of San Diego County, California, lives in San Diego and Chula Vista.

== Income ==
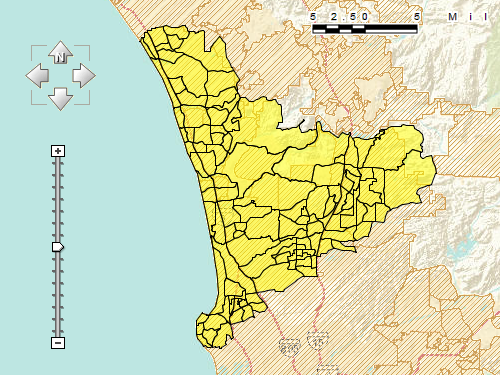
This collection of 116 census tracts in San Diego County has a population of 615,092 and a per capita income of $44,131, about 50 percent more than that of California and the United States.

Despite having a per capita income that ranks between the Los Angeles metropolitan area and the San Francisco Bay Area, San Diego County has relatively few cities or CDPs with a both a high population and levels of income significantly higher than its state and the United States. The San Diego metropolitan area only has two populated places with over 50,000 inhabitants and a per capita income of over $40,000: the cities of Carlsbad and Encinitas. In contrast, the Los Angeles metropolitan area has 10 and the San Francisco Bay Area has 12. (See California locations by income.) Even when controlling for population, the San Diego metropolitan area has unusually few large areas with high per capita incomes compared to the state's other two major metropolitan areas. This is because much of the county's high-income residents are concentrated in the northern part of the city of San Diego, which is reported as one unit for most demographic purposes.

The county's largest continuous high-income urban area has the appearance of a triangle constructed from a first point on the northern edge of Carlsbad, a second point northeast of Poway and a third point on the southern edge of La Jolla in San Diego. The region is pictured to the right. It contains all or most of the cities of Carlsbad, Encinitas, Solana Beach, Del Mar, and Poway in addition to a substantial portion of northern San Diego.

== Homelessness ==
Since 2015, the county has the fourth largest population of homeless individuals in the United States. Only New York City, Los Angeles County, California, and King County, Washington have larger homeless populations. Some of these homeless individuals are bused to the county, paid by other municipalities elsewhere. In 2017 and early 2018, the homeless population in San Diego County experienced an outbreak of Hepatitis A.

== 2011 ==
Population, race, and income
| Total population | 3,060,849 | |
| White | 2,182,604 | 71.3% |
| Hispanic or Latino (of any race) | 967,858 | 31.6% |
| Asian | 333,314 | 10.9% |
| Black or African American | 154,076 | 5.0% |
| American Indian or Alaska Native | 20,597 | 0.7% |
| Native Hawaiian or other Pacific Islander | 14,266 | 0.5% |
| Some other race | 220,000 | 7.2% |
| Two or more races | 135,992 | 4.4% |
| Per capita income | $30,955 | |
| Median household income | $63,857 | |
| Median family income | $74,633 | |

=== Places by population, race, and income ===
Places by population and race
| Place | Type | Population | White | Other (Note: Other = Some other race + Two or more races) | Asian | Black or African American | Native American (Note: Native American = Native Hawaiian or other Pacific Islander + American Indian or Alaska Native) | Hispanic or Latino (of any race) |
|---|---|---|---|---|---|---|---|---|
| Alpine | CDP | 13,332 | 87.9% | 8.7% | 1.3% | 1.4% | 0.7% | 15.8% |
| Bonita | CDP | 13,824 | 74.1% | 10.9% | 9.3% | 4.1% | 1.6% | 46.7% |
| Bonsall | CDP | 3,836 | 78.3% | 12.0% | 5.7% | 3.9% | 0.0% | 16.3% |
| Borrego Springs | CDP | 2,427 | 71.2% | 25.3% | 2.6% | 0.0% | 0.9% | 43.3% |
| Bostonia | CDP | 13,705 | 85.3% | 6.0% | 2.3% | 5.3% | 1.0% | 28.6% |
| Boulevard | CDP | 23 | 100.0% | 0.0% | 0.0% | 0.0% | 0.0% | 17.4% |
| Campo | CDP | 2,482 | 80.3% | 4.4% | 2.6% | 9.5% | 3.2% | 33.0% |
| Camp Pendleton Mainside | CDP | 6,948 | 65.7% | 14.8% | 4.3% | 11.1% | 4.1% | 24.3% |
| Camp Pendleton South | CDP | 11,193 | 61.0% | 23.4% | 3.5% | 11.8% | 0.3% | 25.4% |
| Carlsbad | City | 102,342 | 86.0% | 5.7% | 7.4% | 0.6% | 0.3% | 13.4% |
| Casa de Oro-Mount Helix | CDP | 18,498 | 84.2% | 4.4% | 3.0% | 7.8% | 0.7% | 17.1% |
| Chula Vista | City | 236,218 | 64.5% | 15.4% | 14.3% | 4.5% | 1.3% | 56.8% |
| Coronado | City | 19,423 | 89.4% | 5.2% | 2.8% | 2.0% | 0.6% | 14.5% |
| Crest | CDP | 2,138 | 96.9% | 1.6% | 0.8% | 0.0% | 0.7% | 11.6% |
| Del Mar | City | 4,175 | 93.8% | 4.1% | 2.0% | 0.0% | 0.0% | 4.0% |
| Descanso | CDP | 1,310 | 93.1% | 0.9% | 4.7% | 0.8% | 0.5% | 4.8% |
| El Cajon | City | 98,813 | 77.4% | 11.9% | 4.2% | 5.0% | 1.5% | 31.6% |
| Encinitas | City | 59,223 | 88.7% | 5.6% | 4.4% | 0.5% | 0.8% | 14.4% |
| Escondido | City | 142,573 | 79.9% | 11.6% | 5.8% | 1.8% | 1.0% | 47.6% |
| Eucalyptus Hills | CDP | 5,776 | 79.2% | 10.7% | 1.9% | 6.2% | 2.0% | 16.0% |
| Fairbanks Ranch | CDP | 2,164 | 94.8% | 3.2% | 1.9% | 0.0% | 0.0% | 4.3% |
| Fallbrook | CDP | 30,949 | 74.9% | 20.7% | 1.5% | 2.0% | 0.8% | 43.7% |
| Granite Hills | CDP | 3,434 | 87.0% | 10.4% | 1.0% | 0.0% | 1.6% | 16.6% |
| Harbison Canyon | CDP | 4,131 | 86.7% | 9.7% | 1.3% | 0.3% | 1.9% | 13.3% |
| Hidden Meadows | CDP | 3,892 | 85.0% | 3.8% | 9.4% | 1.5% | 0.3% | 6.6% |
| Imperial Beach | City | 26,348 | 72.9% | 13.1% | 8.0% | 4.7% | 1.4% | 45.9% |
| Jacumba Hot Springs | CDP | 375 | 91.7% | 2.7% | 0.0% | 0.0% | 5.6% | 74.7% |
| Jamul | CDP | 5,145 | 84.8% | 8.9% | 2.2% | 3.6% | 0.5% | 17.4% |
| Julian | CDP | 1,403 | 93.5% | 3.2% | 0.6% | 0.0% | 2.7% | 9.0% |
| Lake San Marcos | CDP | 5,240 | 86.7% | 10.0% | 2.0% | 1.0% | 0.2% | 10.9% |
| Lakeside | CDP | 20,831 | 92.4% | 4.7% | 1.1% | 1.0% | 0.8% | 20.3% |
| La Mesa | City | 56,722 | 74.6% | 10.5% | 6.5% | 7.6% | 0.8% | 18.8% |
| La Presa | CDP | 34,607 | 65.5% | 10.3% | 10.4% | 13.0% | 0.9% | 46.7% |
| Lemon Grove | City | 25,250 | 59.8% | 22.6% | 5.4% | 11.1% | 1.1% | 41.7% |
| Mount Laguna | CDP | 0 | 0.0% | 0.0% | 0.0% | 0.0% | 0.0% | 0.0% |
| National City | City | 58,015 | 62.3% | 12.9% | 20.0% | 4.5% | 0.4% | 64.2% |
| Oceanside | City | 166,139 | 65.1% | 21.3% | 7.2% | 4.5% | 1.8% | 36.6% |
| Pine Valley | CDP | 1,005 | 96.7% | 3.3% | 0.0% | 0.0% | 0.0% | 4.8% |
| Potrero | CDP | 1,366 | 78.9% | 21.1% | 0.0% | 0.0% | 0.0% | 84.6% |
| Poway | City | 47,762 | 80.3% | 8.9% | 9.3% | 1.4% | 0.2% | 16.3% |
| Rainbow | CDP | 1,819 | 77.5% | 20.6% | 0.9% | 0.3% | 0.6% | 36.1% |
| Ramona | CDP | 21,673 | 85.5% | 11.9% | 1.2% | 0.6% | 0.8% | 33.5% |
| Rancho San Diego | CDP | 21,495 | 82.4% | 7.7% | 4.7% | 5.1% | 0.1% | 15.2% |
| Rancho Santa Fe | CDP | 3,128 | 93.9% | 3.6% | 1.9% | 0.0% | 0.6% | 6.2% |
| San Diego | City | 1,296,437 | 65.8% | 10.6% | 15.8% | 6.8% | 1.0% | 28.2% |
| San Diego Country Estates | CDP | 10,392 | 91.1% | 4.6% | 1.5% | 1.5% | 1.3% | 11.0% |
| San Marcos | City | 80,709 | 75.2% | 12.1% | 8.9% | 3.1% | 0.7% | 36.6% |
| Santee | City | 53,302 | 85.6% | 8.9% | 3.4% | 1.4% | 0.8% | 16.5% |
| Solana Beach | City | 12,864 | 86.1% | 6.7% | 4.0% | 2.7% | 0.5% | 16.8% |
| Spring Valley | CDP | 27,827 | 74.4% | 9.3% | 4.4% | 10.4% | 1.5% | 29.2% |
| Valley Center | CDP | 9,381 | 75.9% | 14.0% | 7.4% | 0.8% | 2.0% | 27.4% |
| Vista | City | 93,293 | 75.1% | 17.0% | 4.0% | 2.8% | 1.0% | 47.3% |
| Winter Gardens | CDP | 20,143 | 89.1% | 8.2% | 0.7% | 1.6% | 0.4% | 16.1% |

Places by population and income
| Place | Type | Population | Per capita income | Median household income | Median family income |
|---|---|---|---|---|---|
| Alpine | CDP | 13,332 | $39,472 | $76,663 | $88,052 |
| Bonita | CDP | 13,824 | $33,856 | $75,670 | $89,033 |
| Bonsall | CDP | 3,836 | $46,306 | $79,375 | $86,071 |
| Borrego Springs | CDP | 2,427 | $23,701 | $40,984 | $43,056 |
| Bostonia | CDP | 13,705 | $20,596 | $45,650 | $53,864 |
| Boulevard | CDP | 23 | $6,096 | | |
| Campo | CDP | 2,482 | $24,670 | $58,083 | $58,792 |
| Camp Pendleton Mainside | CDP | 6,948 | $17,401 | $38,167 | $38,062 |
| Camp Pendleton South | CDP | 11,193 | $16,311 | $50,457 | $51,189 |
| Carlsbad | City | 102,342 | $42,712 | $85,743 | $102,254 |
| Casa de Oro-Mount Helix | CDP | 18,498 | $41,613 | $86,109 | $97,319 |
| Chula Vista | City | 236,218 | $25,419 | $65,526 | $73,736 |
| Coronado | City | 19,423 | $48,752 | $93,777 | $109,474 |
| Crest | CDP | 2,138 | $41,637 | $84,246 | $92,188 |
| Del Mar | City | 4,175 | $82,614 | $114,531 | $146,331 |
| Descanso | CDP | 1,310 | $33,266 | $59,432 | $62,500 |
| El Cajon | City | 98,813 | $21,132 | $47,303 | $53,858 |
| Encinitas | City | 59,223 | $47,346 | $88,458 | $107,475 |
| Escondido | City | 142,573 | $23,194 | $50,597 | $55,994 |
| Eucalyptus Hills | CDP | 5,776 | $27,991 | $72,639 | $82,679 |
| Fairbanks Ranch | CDP | 2,164 | $47,038 | $129,111 | $132,500 |
| Fallbrook | CDP | 30,949 | $27,512 | $58,279 | $64,319 |
| Granite Hills | CDP | 3,434 | $40,589 | $86,250 | $91,667 |
| Harbison Canyon | CDP | 4,131 | $32,587 | $78,313 | $81,625 |
| Hidden Meadows | CDP | 3,892 | $45,015 | $82,708 | $97,875 |
| Imperial Beach | City | 26,348 | $20,175 | $45,480 | $51,440 |
| Jacumba Hot Springs | CDP | 375 | $27,601 | $89,263 | $56,122 |
| Jamul | CDP | 5,145 | $42,058 | $110,402 | $112,923 |
| Julian | CDP | 1,403 | $33,020 | $70,625 | $80,878 |
| Lake San Marcos | CDP | 5,240 | $37,429 | $45,888 | $67,045 |
| Lakeside | CDP | 20,831 | $26,862 | $63,852 | $79,461 |
| La Mesa | City | 56,722 | $29,958 | $54,519 | $70,756 |
| La Presa | CDP | 34,607 | $22,781 | $61,760 | $65,128 |
| Lemon Grove | City | 25,250 | $22,061 | $50,353 | $58,533 |
| Mount Laguna | CDP | 0 | | | |
| National City | City | 58,015 | $16,611 | $36,907 | $42,797 |
| Oceanside | City | 166,139 | $27,674 | $63,394 | $71,600 |
| Pine Valley | CDP | 1,005 | $38,028 | $75,641 | $91,023 |
| Potrero | CDP | 1,366 | $10,178 | $35,536 | $35,071 |
| Poway | City | 47,762 | $41,445 | $94,872 | $106,243 |
| Rainbow | CDP | 1,819 | $24,526 | $48,683 | $51,154 |
| Ramona | CDP | 21,673 | $25,774 | $64,454 | $69,240 |
| Rancho San Diego | CDP | 21,495 | $40,776 | $89,604 | $103,677 |
| Rancho Santa Fe | CDP | 3,128 | $104,522 | $193,913 | $194,402 |
| San Diego | City | 1,296,437 | $33,135 | $63,739 | $77,400 |
| San Diego Country Estates | CDP | 10,392 | $34,728 | $96,069 | $100,694 |
| San Marcos | City | 80,709 | $25,282 | $55,815 | $64,896 |
| Santee | City | 53,302 | $28,242 | $69,828 | $78,795 |
| Solana Beach | City | 12,864 | $54,039 | $85,317 | $106,602 |
| Spring Valley | CDP | 27,827 | $27,932 | $65,822 | $70,291 |
| Valley Center | CDP | 9,381 | $32,921 | $82,379 | $88,375 |
| Vista | City | 93,293 | $21,478 | $50,777 | $53,992 |
| Winter Gardens | CDP | 20,143 | $26,915 | $61,084 | $65,188 |

== 2010 ==
Historical population
| Census | Pop. | Note | %± |
|---|---|---|---|
| 1850 | 798 | | — |
| 1860 | 4,324 | | 441.9% |
| 1870 | 4,951 | | 14.5% |
| 1880 | 8,018 | | 61.9% |
| 1890 | 34,987 | | 336.4% |
| 1900 | 35,090 | | 0.3% |
| 1910 | 61,665 | | 75.7% |
| 1920 | 112,248 | | 82.0% |
| 1930 | 209,659 | | 86.8% |
| 1940 | 289,348 | | 38.0% |
| 1950 | 556,808 | | 92.4% |
| 1960 | 1,033,011 | | 85.5% |
| 1970 | 1,357,854 | | 31.4% |
| 1980 | 1,861,846 | | 37.1% |
| 1990 | 2,498,016 | | 34.2% |
| 2000 | 2,813,833 | | 12.6% |
| 2010 | 3,095,313 | | 10.0% |
| 2014 (est.) | 3,263,431 | | 5.4% |
U.S. Decennial Census; 1790–1960 1900–1990; 1990–2000 2010–2014

The 2010 United States census reported that San Diego County had a population of 3,095,313. The racial makeup of San Diego County was 1,981,442 (64.0%) White, 158,213 (5.1%) African American, 26,340 (0.9%) Native American, 336,091 (10.9%) Asian (4.7% Filipino, 1.6% Vietnamese, 1.4% Chinese, 0.8% Indian, 0.7% Korean, 0.6% Japanese, 0.2% Laotian, 0.2% Cambodian, 0.2% Thai, 0.5% Other Asian), 15,337 (0.5%) Pacific Islander, 419,465 (13.6%) from other races, and 158,425 (5.0%) from two or more races. Hispanic or Latino of any race were 991,348 persons (32.0%).

Population reported at 2010 United States census
| The County | Total; Population | White | African; American | Native; American | Asian | Pacific; Islander | other races | two or more races | Hispanic or Latino (of any race) |
| San Diego County | 3,177,063 | 1,981,442 | 158,213 | 26,340 | 336,091 | 15,337 | 419,465 | 158,425 | 991,348 |
| Incorporated cities | Total; Population | White | African; American | Native; American | Asian | Pacific; Islander | other races | two or more races | Hispanic or Latino (of any race) |
| Carlsbad | 105,328 | 87,205 | 1,379 | 514 | 7,460 | 198 | 4,189 | 4,383 | 13,988 |
| Chula Vista | 243,916 | 130,991 | 11,219 | 1,880 | 35,042 | 1,351 | 49,171 | 14,262 | 142,066 |
| Coronado | 18,912 | 16,668 | 399 | 103 | 572 | 55 | 457 | 658 | 2,302 |
| Del Mar | 4,161 | 3,912 | 10 | 8 | 118 | 3 | 25 | 85 | 175 |
| El Cajon | 99,478 | 68,897 | 6,306 | 835 | 3,561 | 495 | 12,552 | 6,832 | 28,036 |
| Encinitas | 59,518 | 51,067 | 361 | 301 | 2,323 | 91 | 3,339 | 2,036 | 8,138 |
| Escondido | 143,911 | 86,876 | 3,585 | 1,472 | 8,740 | 350 | 36,507 | 6,381 | 70,326 |
| Imperial Beach | 26,324 | 16,467 | 1,170 | 266 | 1,731 | 188 | 4,764 | 1,738 | 12,893 |
| La Mesa | 57,065 | 40,964 | 4,399 | 431 | 3,289 | 318 | 4,326 | 3,338 | 11,696 |
| Lemon Grove | 25,320 | 13,072 | 3,495 | 225 | 1,624 | 275 | 4,828 | 1,801 | 10,435 |
| National City | 58,582 | 24,725 | 3,054 | 618 | 10,699 | 482 | 16,175 | 2,829 | 36,911 |
| Oceanside | 167,086 | 109,020 | 7,873 | 1,385 | 11,081 | 2,144 | 25,886 | 9,697 | 59,947 |
| Poway | 47,811 | 36,781 | 783 | 265 | 4,853 | 106 | 2,944 | 2,079 | 7,508 |
| San Diego | 1,307,402 | 769,971 | 87,949 | 7,696 | 207,944 | 5,908 | 161,246 | 66,688 | 376,020 |
| San Marcos | 83,781 | 53,235 | 1,967 | 591 | 7,518 | 322 | 15,853 | 4,295 | 30,697 |
| Santee | 53,413 | 44,083 | 1,057 | 409 | 2,044 | 253 | 2,677 | 2,890 | 8,699 |
| Solana Beach | 12,867 | 11,039 | 60 | 62 | 513 | 19 | 738 | 436 | 2,048 |
| Vista | 93,834 | 59,551 | 3,137 | 1,103 | 3,979 | 677 | 20,423 | 4,964 | 45,380 |
| Census-designated places | Total; Population | White | African; American | Native; American | Asian | Pacific; Islander | other races | two or more races | Hispanic or Latino (of any race) |
| Alpine | 14,236 | 12,424 | 167 | 222 | 319 | 39 | 576 | 489 | 2,081 |
| Bonita | 12,538 | 8,382 | 466 | 109 | 1,200 | 80 | 1,681 | 620 | 5,106 |
| Bonsall | 3,982 | 3,194 | 67 | 28 | 138 | 10 | 376 | 169 | 893 |
| Borrego Springs | 3,429 | 2,766 | 20 | 34 | 22 | 5 | 500 | 82 | 1,218 |
| Bostonia | 15,379 | 10,891 | 1,011 | 102 | 375 | 89 | 1,781 | 1,130 | 3,941 |
| Boulevard | 315 | 272 | 2 | 7 | 3 | 0 | 14 | 17 | 44 |
| Campo | 5,200 | 3,730 | 501 | 83 | 151 | 80 | 305 | 350 | 1,157 |
| Camp Pendleton North | 10,616 | 7,530 | 992 | 146 | 299 | 41 | 725 | 883 | 2,586 |
| Camp Pendleton South | 2,684 | 2,083 | 114 | 90 | 31 | 6 | 248 | 112 | 794 |
| Casa de Oro-Mount Helix | 18,762 | 14,881 | 1,108 | 89 | 593 | 96 | 996 | 999 | 3,235 |
| Crest | 2,593 | 2,329 | 23 | 21 | 38 | 7 | 90 | 85 | 319 |
| Descanso | 1,423 | 1,290 | 5 | 29 | 16 | 9 | 46 | 28 | 150 |
| Eucalyptus Hills | 5,313 | 4,566 | 195 | 58 | 87 | 6 | 187 | 214 | 782 |
| Fairbanks Ranch | 3,148 | 2,780 | 24 | 7 | 209 | 4 | 34 | 90 | 224 |
| Fallbrook | 30,534 | 20,454 | 489 | 233 | 592 | 71 | 7,372 | 1,323 | 13,800 |
| Granite Hills | 3,035 | 2,617 | 43 | 26 | 45 | 9 | 158 | 137 | 401 |
| Harbison Canyon | 3,841 | 3,404 | 12 | 74 | 71 | 6 | 145 | 129 | 623 |
| Hidden Meadows | 3,485 | 2,865 | 66 | 11 | 318 | 6 | 93 | 126 | 329 |
| Jacumba | 561 | 389 | 4 | 15 | 6 | 0 | 114 | 33 | 207 |
| Jamul | 6,163 | 5,300 | 127 | 28 | 146 | 10 | 294 | 258 | 1,188 |
| Julian | 1,502 | 1,341 | 5 | 27 | 12 | 0 | 81 | 36 | 195 |
| La Presa | 34,169 | 15,064 | 4,428 | 282 | 3,212 | 410 | 8,238 | 2,535 | 16,150 |
| Lake San Marcos | 4,437 | 3,978 | 37 | 20 | 133 | 3 | 186 | 80 | 464 |
| Lakeside | 20,648 | 17,545 | 235 | 181 | 351 | 53 | 1,327 | 956 | 3,627 |
| Mount Laguna | 57 | 55 | 0 | 0 | 1 | 0 | 1 | 0 | 1 |
| Pine Valley | 1,510 | 1,408 | 6 | 6 | 16 | 1 | 20 | 53 | 154 |
| Potrero | 656 | 338 | 0 | 8 | 0 | 3 | 281 | 26 | 499 |
| Rainbow | 1,832 | 1,324 | 19 | 12 | 43 | 12 | 371 | 51 | 665 |
| Ramona | 20,292 | 15,887 | 139 | 224 | 279 | 71 | 2,965 | 727 | 6,334 |
| Rancho San Diego | 21,208 | 17,535 | 817 | 105 | 940 | 56 | 739 | 1,016 | 3,117 |
| Rancho Santa Fe | 3,117 | 2,910 | 10 | 1 | 87 | 4 | 45 | 60 | 176 |
| San Diego Country Estates | 10,109 | 9,107 | 91 | 90 | 147 | 34 | 276 | 364 | 1,126 |
| Spring Valley | 28,205 | 16,781 | 3,131 | 237 | 1,660 | 236 | 4,332 | 1,828 | 9,196 |
| Valley Center | 9,277 | 6,785 | 84 | 188 | 295 | 16 | 1,484 | 425 | 2,581 |
| Winter Gardens | 20,631 | 16,845 | 409 | 234 | 345 | 95 | 1,616 | 1,087 | 4,289 |
| Unincorporated communities | Total; Population | White | African; American | Native; American | Asian | Pacific; Islander | other races | two or more races | Hispanic or Latino (of any race) |
| All others not CDPs (combined) | 161,717 | 117,868 | 5,163 | 5,149 | 10,820 | 534 | 15,668 | 6,515 | 36,431 |

== 2009 ==
As of 2009 Census Bureau estimates, there were 3,053,793 people, 1,067,846 households, and 663,449 families residing in the county. The population density was 670 inhabitants per square mile (260/km^{2}). There were 1,142,245 housing units at an average density of 248 per square mile (96/km^{2}). The racial makeup of the county was 79.4% White American, 5.6% Black or African American, 1% Native American, 10.4% Asian, 0.5% Pacific Islander, 10.3% from other races, and 3.6% from two or more races. 31.3% of the population were Hispanic or Latino of any race. 67.0% spoke only English at home; 21.9% spoke Spanish, 3.1% Tagalog and 1.2% Vietnamese.

== 2000 ==
In 2000, there were 994,677 households, out of which 33.9% had children under the age of 18 living with them, 50.7% were married couples living together, 11.6% had a female householder with no husband present, and 33.3% were non-families. 24.2% of all households were made up of individuals, and 7.9% had someone living alone who was 65 years of age or older. The average household size was 2.73 and the average family size was 3.29.

In the county, the population was spread out, with 25.7% under the age of 18, 11.30% from 18 to 24, 32.0% from 25 to 44, 19.8% from 45 to 64, and 11.2% who were 65 years of age or older. The median age was 33 years. For every 100 females, there were 101.2 males. For every 100 females age 18 and over, there were 99.7 males.

The median income for a household in the county was $47,067, and the median income for a family was $53,438. Males had a median income of $36,952 versus $30,356 for females. The per capita income for the county was $22,926. About 8.9% of families and 12.4% of the population were below the poverty line, including 16.5% of those under age 18 and 6.8% of those age 65 or over.

In 2000, only about 3% of San Diego County residents left the county for work while 40,000 people commuted into the metropolitan area.

== See also ==
- San Diego County, California#Demographics
