= California's 48th congressional district =

U.S. House district for California

Coordinates: 33°37′06″N 117°52′19″W

- Interactive map of district boundaries
- Representative: Darrell Issa; R–Bonsall
- Population (2025): 763,013
- Median household income: $114,858
- Ethnicity: 53.3% White; 29.4% Hispanic; 6.9% Asian; 5.4% Two or more races; 3.1% Black; 1.0% Native American; 0.9% other
- Cook PVI: R+7

California's 48th congressional district is a congressional district in the U.S. state of California that covers East County, San Diego as well as the Temecula Valley. Major cities in the district include Temecula, Murrieta, and portions of Escondido. It is currently represented by Republican Darrell Issa.

From 2013 to 2023, the district included Costa Mesa, Emerald Bay, Fountain Valley, Huntington Beach, Laguna Beach, Laguna Niguel, Newport Beach, Seal Beach, Sunset Beach, and parts of Garden Grove, Midway City, Aliso Viejo, Santa Ana, and Westminster. It was very competitive and had recently been won by each of the two main parties. In the 2018 House elections, Democrat Harley Rouda became the district's representative, defeating incumbent Republican Dana Rohrabacher. Rouda was then defeated by Republican Michelle Steel in the 2020 elections.

From 2003 to 2013, the district included the cities of Aliso Viejo, Dana Point, Irvine, Laguna Beach, Laguna Hills, Laguna Niguel, Laguna Woods, Lake Forest (formerly known as El Toro), Tustin, parts of Irvine, parts of Newport Beach, and parts of San Juan Capistrano.

== Recent election results from statewide races ==
=== 2023–2027 boundaries ===
Year	Office	Results
2008	President	McCain 61% - 39%
2010	Governor	Whitman 63% - 31%
2010	Lt. Governor	Maldonado 58% - 29%
2010	Secretary of State	Dunn 61% - 31%
2010	Attorney General	Cooley 66% - 25%
2010	Treasurer	Walters 58% - 35%
2010	Controller	Strickland 57% - 35%
2012	President	Romney 63% - 37%
2014	Governor	Kashkari 65% - 35%
2016	President	Trump 57% - 37%
2018	Governor	Cox 62% - 38%
2018	Attorney General	Bailey 60% - 40%
2020	President	Trump 55% - 43%
2022	Senate (Reg.)	Meuser 60% - 40%
2022	Governor	Dahle 62% - 38%
2022	Lt. Governor	Underwood Jacobs 61% - 39%
2022	Secretary of State	Bernosky 61% - 39%
2022	Attorney General	Hochman 61% - 39%
2022	Treasurer	Guerrero 62% - 38%
2022	Controller	Chen 63% - 37%
2024	President	Trump 56% - 41%
2024	Senate (Reg.)	Garvey 60% - 40%

=== 2027–2033 boundaries ===
Year	Office	Results
2008	President	McCain 53% - 47%
2012	President	Romney 55% - 45%
2016	President	Trump 47.3% - 46.9%
2018	Governor	Cox 51% - 49%
2018	Attorney General	Becerra 50.3% - 49.7%
2020	President	Biden 53% - 45%
2022	Senate (Reg.)	Padilla 51% - 49%
2022	Governor	Dahle 51% - 49%
2022	Lt. Governor	Underwood Jacobs 50.3% - 49.7%
2022	Secretary of State	Weber 50.1% - 49.9%
2022	Attorney General	Hochman 51% - 49%
2022	Treasurer	Guerrero 51% - 49%
2024	President	Harris 50% - 47%
2024	Senate (Reg.)	Schiff 50.3% - 49.7%

== Composition ==
FIPS County Code	County	Seat	Population
65	Riverside	Riverside	2,492,442
73	San Diego	San Diego	3,269,973

Under the 2020 redistricting, California's 48th congressional district is located in Southern California. The district encompasses some of the East County and all of the Mountain Empire areas of San Diego County; and part of southwestern Riverside County. The area in San Diego County includes the cities of Santee, Poway, and northern Escondido; and the census-designated places Ramona, Rancho San Diego, Winter Gardens, Bostonia, Alpine, Campo, Hidden Meadows, Fallbrook, Valley Center, Bonsall, Rainbow, Pala, Borrego Springs, Julian, San Diego Country Estates, Eucalyptus Hills, Lakeside, Granite Hills, Jamul, Casa de Oro-Mount Helix, Crest, Harbison Canyon, Descanso, Pine Valley, Mount Laguna, Portero, Boulevard, and Jacumba. The area in Riverside County includes the cities of Temecula and Murrieta; and the census-designated places Aguanga and Lake Riverside.

San Diego County is split between this district, the 49th district, the 50th district, the 51st district, and the 52nd district. The 48th and 49th are partitioned by Gavilan Mountain Rd, Sandia Creek Dr, De Luz Rd, Marine Corps Base Pendleton, Sleeping Indian Rd, Tumbleweed Ln, Del Valle Dr, Highland Oak St, Olive Hill Rd, Via Puerta del Sol, N River Rd, Highway 76, Old River Rd, and Little Gopher Canyon Rd.

The 48th and 50th are partitioned by Gopher Canyon Rd, Escondido Freeway, Mountain Meadow Rd, Hidden Meadows, Reidy Cyn, N Broadway, Cougar Pass Rd, Adagio Way, Calle Ricardo, Tatas Place, Rue Montreux, Jesmond Dene Rd, Ivy Dell Ln, N Centre City Parkway, Highway 15, Richland Rd, Vista Canal, Woodland Parkway, W El Norte Parkway, Bennett Ave, Elser Ln, Nordahl Rd, Calavo Dr, Deodar Rd, Highway 78, Barham Dr, 2315-2339 Meyers Ave, Hill Valley Dr, County Club Dr, Auto Park Way, Highway 56, N Centre City Parkway, W Valley Parkway, N Juniper St, Highway 78, N Hickory St, E Mission Ave, Martin Dr, E Lincoln Ave, N Ash St, E Grand Ave, Bear Valley Parkway, Old Guerjito Rd, San Pasqual Battlefield State Historic Park, San Pasqual Trails Openspace, San Dieguito River Park, Bandy Canyon Rd, Santa Maria Creek, Highland Valley Rd, West Ridge Trail, Palmer Dr/Summerfield Ln, Pomerado Rd, and Carmel Mountain Ranch Openspace.

The 48th and 51st are partitioned by Sabre Springs Openspace, Scripps Miramar Openspace, Beeler Canyon Rd, Sycamore Canyon Openspace, Weston Rd, Boulder Vis, Mast Blvd, West Hills Parkway, San Diego River, Highway 52, Simeon Dr, Mission Trails Openspace, Fanita Dr, Farmington Dr, Lund St, Nielsen St, Paseo de Los Castillos, Gillespie Air Field, Kenney St, San Vicente Freeway, Airport Dr, Wing Ave, W Bradley Ave, Vernon Way, Hart Dr, Greenfield Dr, E Bradley Ave, 830 Adele St-1789 N Mollison Ave, Peppervilla Dr/N Mollison Ave, Pepper Dr, Greta St/Cajon Greens Dr, N Mollison Ave/Buckey Dr, Denver Ln, Broadway Channel, N 2nd St, Flamingo Ave/Greenfield Dr, Dawnridge Ave/Cresthill Rd, Groveland Ter/Camillo Way, Sterling Dr, Kumeyaay Highway, E Madison Ave, Granite Hills Dr, E Lexington Ave, Dehesa Rd, Vista del Valle Blvd, Merritt Ter, E Washington Ave, Merritt Dr, Dewitt Ct, Emerald Heights Rd, Foote Path Way, Highway 8, Lemon Ave, Lake Helix Dr, La Cruz Dr, Carmichael Dr, Bancroft Dr, Campo Rd, and Sweetwater River.

The 48th and 52nd are partitioned by San Miguel Rd, Proctor Valley Rd, Camino Mojave/Jonel Way, Highway 125, Upper Otay Reservoir, Otay Lakes Rd, Otay Valley Regional Park, Alta Rd, and Otay Mountain Truck Trail.

Riverside County is split between this district and the 41st district. They are partitioned by Ortega Highway, Tenaja Truck Trail, NF-7506, Tenaja, San Mateo Creek, Los Alamos Rd, Und 233, S Main Dv, Wildomar, Grand Ave, Rancho Mirlo Dr, Copper Canyon Park, 42174 Kimberly Way-35817 Darcy Pl, Escondido Expressway, Scott Rd, 33477 Little Reb Pl-33516 Pittman Ln, Keller Rd, Menifee Rd, Clinton Keith Rd, Max Gilliss Blvd, Highway 79, Borel Rd, Lake Skinner, Warren Rd, Summitville St, Indian Knoll Rd, E Benton Rd, Rancho California Rd, Overhill Rd, Green Meadow Rd, Crossover Rd, Exa-Ely Rd, Denise Rd, Wiley Rd, Powerline Rd, Wilson Valley Rd, Wilson Creek, Reed Valley Rd, Centennial St, Beaver Ave, and Lake Vista Dr.

=== Cities and CDPs with 10,000 or more people ===
- Escondido – 151,038
- Murrieta – 113,783
- Temecula – 111,752
- Santee – 60,037
- Poway – 48,841
- Fallbrook – 32,267
- Winter Gardens – 22,380
- Rancho San Diego – 21,858
- Ramona – 21,468
- Lakeside – 21,152
- Casa de Oro-Mount Helix – 19,576
- Bostonia – 16,882
- Alpine – 14,696
- San Diego Country Estates – 10,395
- Valley Center – 10,087

=== 2,500 – 10,000 people ===
- Jamul – 6,179
- Eucalyptus Hills – 5,517
- Bonsall – 4,546
- Hidden Meadows – 4,484
- Harbison Canyon – 4,048
- Granite Hills – 3,267
- Borrego Springs – 3,073
- Campo – 2,955
- Crest – 2,828

== List of members representing the district ==
Member	Party	Dates	Cong ress	Electoral history	Counties
District created January 3, 1993
Ron Packard (Oceanside)	Republican	January 3, 1993 – January 3, 2001	103rd 104th 105th 106th	Redistricted from the 43rd district and re-elected in 1992. Re-elected in 1994. Re-elected in 1996. Re-elected in 1998. Retired.	1993–2003; Southern Orange, Riverside (Temecula), Northwestern San Diego
Darrell Issa (Vista)	Republican	January 3, 2001 – January 3, 2003	107th	Elected in 2000. Redistricted to the 49th district.	1993–2003; Southern Orange, Riverside (Temecula), Northwestern San Diego
Christopher Cox (Newport Beach)	Republican	January 3, 2003 – August 2, 2005	108th 109th	Redistricted from the 47th district and re-elected in 2002. Re-elected in 2004. Resigned to become Chairman of the U.S. Securities and Exchange Commission.	2003–2013 South-central Orange County
Vacant		August 2, 2005 – December 7, 2005	109th		2003–2013 South-central Orange County
John Campbell (Irvine)	Republican	December 7, 2005 – January 3, 2013	109th 110th 111th 112th	Elected to finish Cox's term. Re-elected in 2006. Re-elected in 2008. Re-elected in 2010. Redistricted to the 45th district.	2003–2013 South-central Orange County
Dana Rohrabacher (Costa Mesa)	Republican	January 3, 2013 – January 3, 2019	113th 114th 115th	Redistricted from the 46th district and re-elected in 2012. Re-elected in 2014. Re-elected in 2016. Lost re-election.	2013–2023 Coastal Orange County (Huntington Beach)
Harley Rouda (Newport Beach)	Democratic	January 3, 2019 – January 3, 2021	116th	Elected in 2018. Lost re-election.	2013–2023 Coastal Orange County (Huntington Beach)
Michelle Steel (Seal Beach)	Republican	January 3, 2021 – January 3, 2023	117th	Elected in 2020. Redistricted to the 45th district.	2013–2023 Coastal Orange County (Huntington Beach)
Darrell Issa (Bonsall)	Republican	January 3, 2023 – present	118th 119th	Redistricted from the 50th district and re-elected in 2022. Re-elected in 2024. Retiring at the end of term.	2023–2027: Central and eastern portions of San Diego county
Marni von Wilpert (San Diego)	Democratic	Assuming office on January 3, 2027		Elected in 2026.	2023–2027: Central and eastern portions of San Diego county

== Election results ==
District created January 3, 1993.

=== 1992 ===
1992 United States House of Representatives elections in California
Party	Candidate	Votes	%
Republican	Ron Packard (Incumbent)	140,935	61.1
Democratic	Michael P. "Mike" Farber	67,415	29.3
Peace and Freedom	Donna White	13,396	5.8
Libertarian	Ted Lowe	8,749	3.8
Total votes		230,495	100.0
Republican hold			

=== 1994 ===
1994 United States House of Representatives elections in California
Party	Candidate	Votes	%
Republican	Ron Packard (Incumbent)	143,570	73.4
Democratic	Andrei Leschick	43,523	22.2
Reform	Donna White	8,543	4.4
Total votes		195,636	100.0
Republican hold			

=== 1996 ===
1996 United States House of Representatives elections in California
Party	Candidate	Votes	%
Republican	Ron Packard (Incumbent)	145,814	65.9
Democratic	Dan Farrell	59,558	26.9
Reform	William Dreu	8,013	3.6
Natural Law	Sharon Miles	8,006	3.6
Total votes		221,391	100.0
Republican hold			

=== 1998 ===
1998 United States House of Representatives elections in California
Party	Candidate	Votes	%
Republican	Ron Packard (Incumbent)	138,948	76.9
Natural Law	Sharon K. Miles	23,262	12.9
Libertarian	Daniel L. Muhe	18,509	10.2
Total votes		180,719	100.0
Republican hold			

=== 2000 ===
2000 United States House of Representatives elections in California
Party	Candidate	Votes	%
Republican	Darrell Issa	160,627	61.5
Democratic	Peter Kouvelis	74,073	28.4
Reform	Eddie Rose	11,240	4.3
Natural Law	Sharon K. Miles	8,269	3.1
Libertarian	Joe Michael Cobb	7,269	2.7
Total votes		261,478	100.0
Republican hold			

=== 2002 ===
2002 United States House of Representatives elections in California
Party	Candidate	Votes	%
Republican	Christopher Cox (Incumbent)	122,884	68.5
Democratic	John Graham	51,058	28.4
Libertarian	Joe Michael Cobb	5,607	3.1
Total votes		179,549	100.0
Republican hold			

=== 2004 ===
2004 United States House of Representatives elections in California
Party	Candidate	Votes	%
Republican	Christopher Cox (Incumbent)	189,004	65.0
Democratic	John Graham	93,525	32.2
Libertarian	Bruce Cohen	8,343	2.8
Total votes		290,872	100.0
Republican hold			

=== 2005 ===
2005 California 48th congressional district special election
Party	Candidate	Votes	%
Republican	John Campbell	46,184	44.4
Democratic	Steve Young	28,853	27.8
American Independent	Jim Gilchrist	26,507	25.5
Green	Bea Tiritilli	1,430	1.4
Libertarian	Bruce Cohen	974	0.9
Invalid or blank votes		457	0.4
Total votes		104,405	100.0
Turnout			25.7
Republican hold			

=== 2006 ===
2006 United States House of Representatives elections in California
Party	Candidate	Votes	%
Republican	John Campbell (Incumbent)	120,130	59.9
Democratic	Steve Young	74,647	37.2
Libertarian	Bruce Cohen	5,750	2.9
Total votes		200,527	100.0
Republican hold			

=== 2008 ===
2008 United States House of Representatives elections in California
Party	Candidate	Votes	%
Republican	John Campbell (Incumbent)	171,658	55.7
Democratic	Steve Young	125,537	40.6
Libertarian	Don Patterson	11,507	3.7
Total votes		308,702	100.00
Republican hold			

=== 2010 ===
2010 United States House of Representatives elections in California
Party	Candidate	Votes	%
Republican	John Campbell (Incumbent)	145,481	60.0
Democratic	Beth Krom	88,465	36.4
Libertarian	Mike Binkley	8,773	3.6
Total votes		242,719	100.0
Republican hold			

=== 2012 ===
2012 United States House of Representatives elections in California
Party	Candidate	Votes	%
Republican	Dana Rohrabacher (Incumbent)	177,144	61.0
Democratic	Ron Varasteh	113,358	39.0
Total votes		290,502	100.0
Republican hold			

=== 2014 ===
2014 United States House of Representatives elections in California
Party	Candidate	Votes	%
Republican	Dana Rohrabacher (Incumbent)	112,082	64.1
Democratic	Suzanne Joyce Savary	62,713	35.9
Total votes		174,795	100.0
Republican hold			

=== 2016 ===
2016 United States House of Representatives elections in California
Party	Candidate	Votes	%
Republican	Dana Rohrabacher (Incumbent)	178,701	58.3
Democratic	Suzanne Joyce Savary	127,715	41.7
Total votes		306,416	100.0
Republican hold			

=== 2018 ===
2018 United States House of Representatives elections in California
Party	Candidate	Votes	%
Democratic	Harley Rouda	157,837	53.6
Republican	Dana Rohrabacher (Incumbent)	136,899	46.4
Total votes		294,736	100.0
Democratic gain from Republican			

=== 2020 ===
2020 United States House of Representatives elections in California
Party	Candidate	Votes	%
Republican	Michelle Steel	201,738	51.1
Democratic	Harley Rouda (Incumbent)	193,362	48.9
Total votes		395,100	100.0
Republican gain from Democratic			

=== 2022 ===
2022 United States House of Representatives elections in California
Party	Candidate	Votes	%
Republican	Darrell Issa (Incumbent)	151,171	60.4
Democratic	Stephen Houlahan	101,900	39.6
Total votes		253,071	100.0
Republican hold			

=== 2024 ===
2024 United States House of Representatives elections in California
Party	Candidate	Votes	%
Republican	Darrell Issa (Incumbent)	213,625	59.3
Democratic	Stephen Houlahan	146,665	40.7
Total votes		360,290	100.0
Republican hold			

== Historical district boundaries ==
=== 2003-13 ===
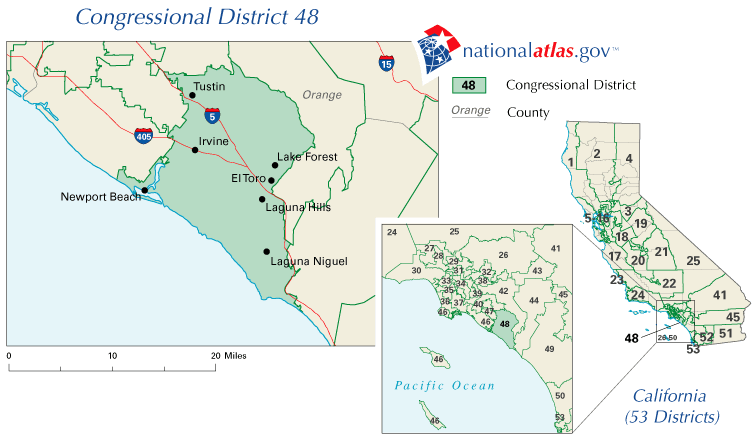
From 2003 through 2013, the district consisted of many of Orange's south-central suburbs, including Irvine, and Newport Beach.

=== 2013-23 ===
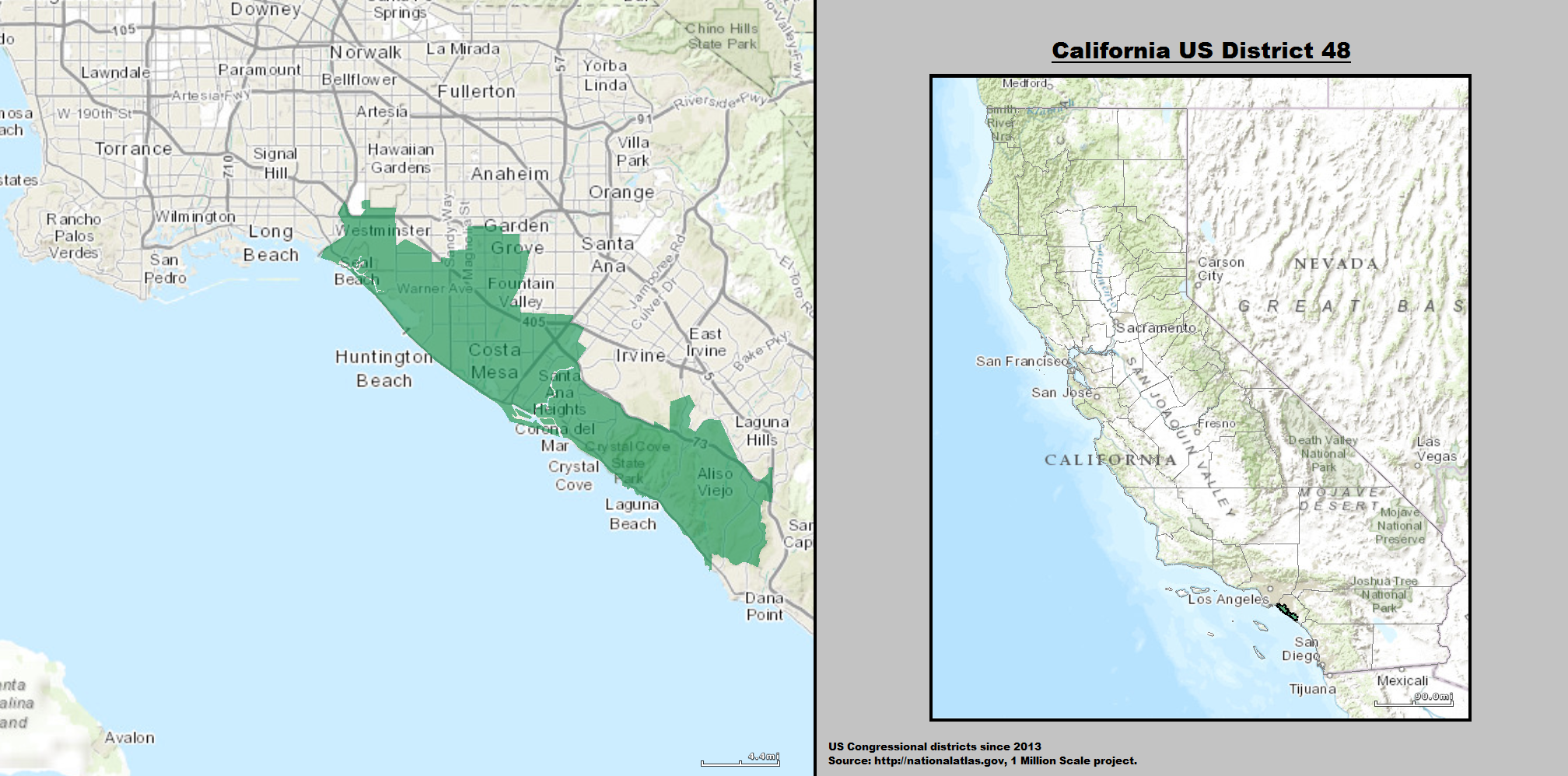
Due to redistricting after the 2010 United States census, the district has moved south east along the coast of Orange and then included Laguna Beach and Huntington Beach.

After the 2020 United States census, the district was moved to the inland portion of San Diego County, including Fallbrook, Murrieta, Temecula, Pauma Valley, Warner Springs, Borrego Springs, Santa Ysabel, Julian, Ramona, Poway, Santee, Lakeside, Descanso, Jamul, Dulzura, Alpine, Pine Valley, Campo, Jacumba Hot Springs, all of San Diego's Mountain Empire, San Diego's Indian reservations and portions of northern Escondido, and eastern La Mesa.

== See also ==
- List of United States congressional districts
- California's congressional districts
- California 48th congressional district special election, 2005
