= East County, San Diego =

East County
- Region of the San Diego Metro Area
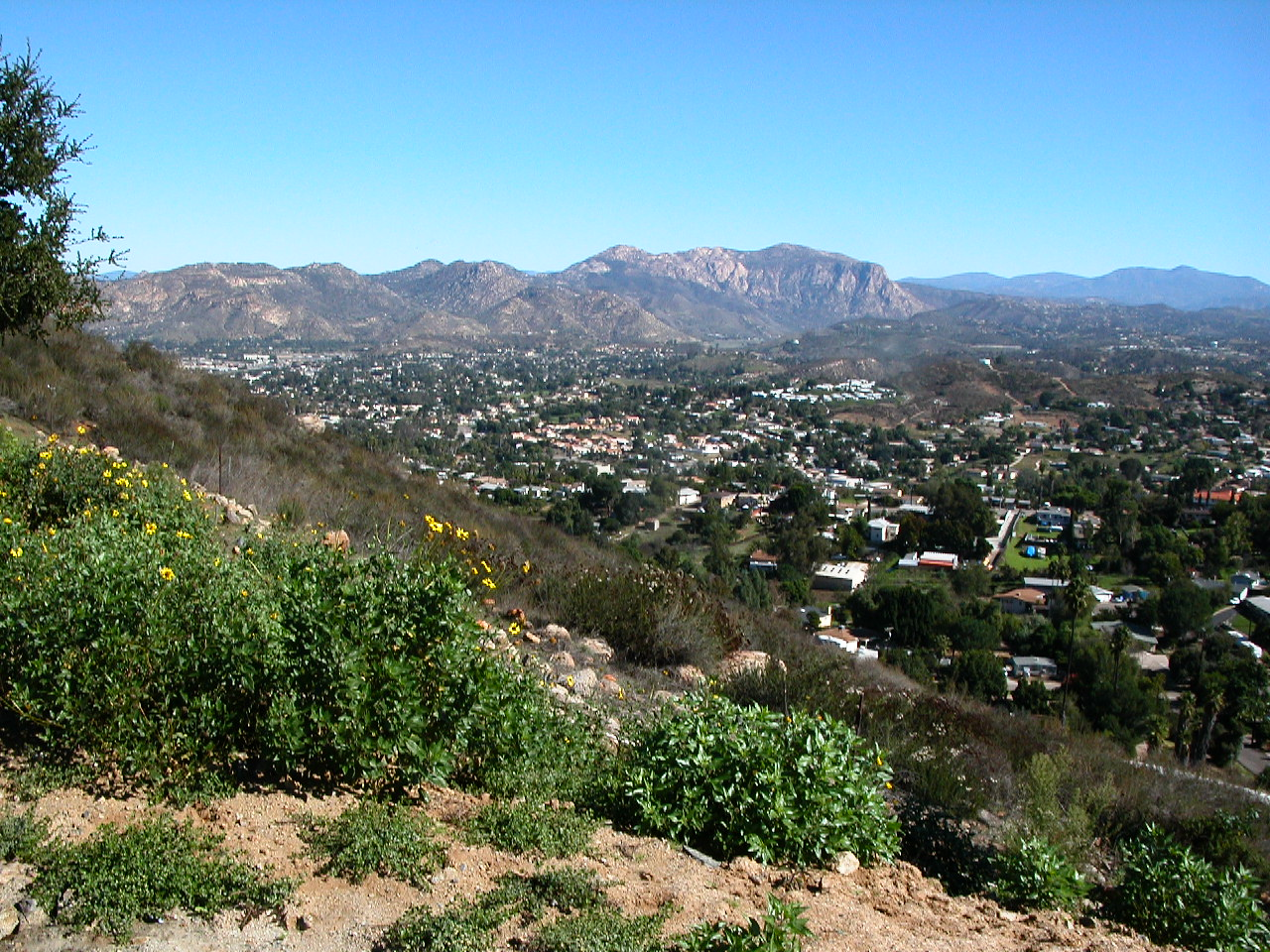
- Santee, one of the four cities in East County

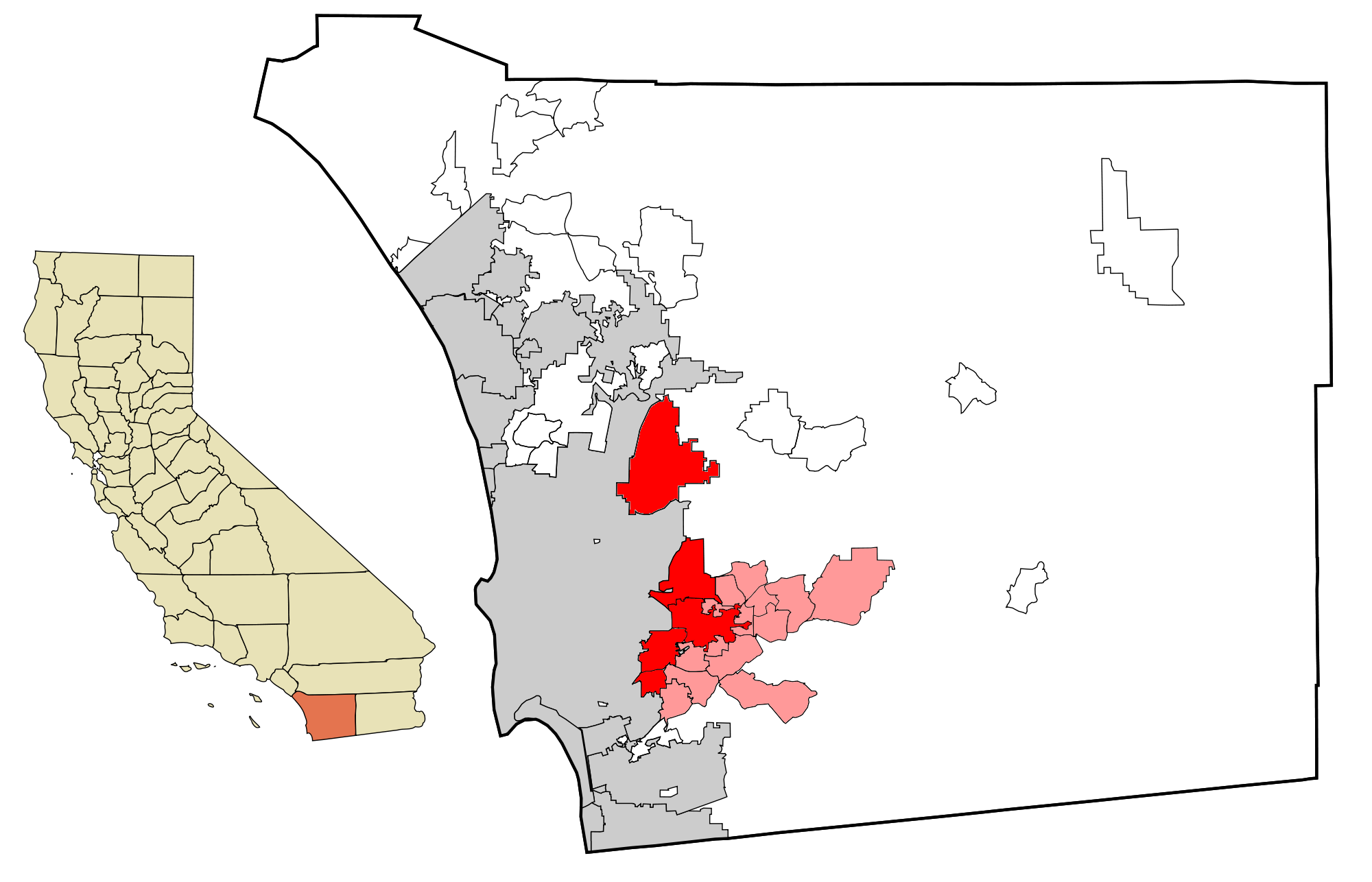
- East County cities (red) and census-designated places (pink)
- Country: United States
- State: California
- County: San Diego County

Population
  - Total: 465,000

East County is a region of San Diego County, California, east of San Diego.

== Geography ==
East County does not have an official geographic definition, although East County boundaries are unofficially drawn by the County of San Diego for its second district. It commonly includes El Cajon, La Mesa, Lemon Grove, and Santee, as well as suburban and rural unincorporated communities such as Lakeside, Spring Valley, Jamul, and Alpine. Many sources also include vast swaths of the backcountry of San Diego County also known as the Mountain Empire, including communities along Interstate 8 such as Pine Valley and Descanso, and communities along the rural section of California State Route 94 such as Potrero, Boulevard, and Jacumba. Other sources consider communities within the entire eastern two-thirds of the county to be East County, thereby encompassing places like Ramona, Julian, and Borrego Springs. The Ramona area—Ramona, San Diego Country Estates and Barona Mesa—is often considered part of inland North County due to its association with Rancho Bernardo, Escondido and other North County Inland communities.

The populace of East County primarily dwells in the interior valleys east of San Diego proper while some development encroaches on the coastal foothills.

A broader definition of East County exists that includes the Cuyamaca Mountains and the Laguna Mountains, as well as the desert area of Anza-Borrego Desert State Park. Yet, this definition, when used by SANDAG, excludes the East Suburban centers.

Prominent geologic formations include El Cajon Mountain, a large, dome-shaped mountain overlooking Santee and Lakeside.

== Demographics ==
East County is the fourth most populous region in the San Diego metropolitan area, though its population is close to that of South Bay.

== Populated places ==
Populations listed are from the 2020 census:

=== Incorporated cities ===
Incorporated Cities in East County, San Diego
City	Population
El Cajon	106,215
La Mesa	61,121
Santee	60,037
Lemon Grove	27,627

=== Census-designated places ===
Census-designated places in East County, San Diego
Census-designated place	Population
La Presa	35,033
Spring Valley	30,998
Winter Gardens	22,380
Rancho San Diego	21,858
Lakeside	21,152
Casa de Oro-Mount Helix	19,576
Bostonia	16,882
Alpine	14,696
Jamul	6,179
Eucalyptus Hills	5,517
Harbison Canyon	4,048
Granite Hills	3,267
Crest	2,828

=== Other unincorporated communities ===
- Dehesa
- Flinn Springs

=== Former communities ===
- Foster

== Education ==
=== Primary and secondary schools ===
East County is served by Santee School District, Grossmont Union High School District, Cajon Valley Union School District, Lakeside Union School District, Lemon Grove School District.

=== Higher education ===
Grossmont College, located in El Cajon, and Cuyamaca College, located in Rancho San Diego, are two community colleges in the East County region. San Diego Christian College is located in Santee.

== Landmarks ==
Important landmarks in East County included El Capitan, Mt. Helix, Santee Lakes, Sweetwater Reservoir, and Lake Cuyamaca.

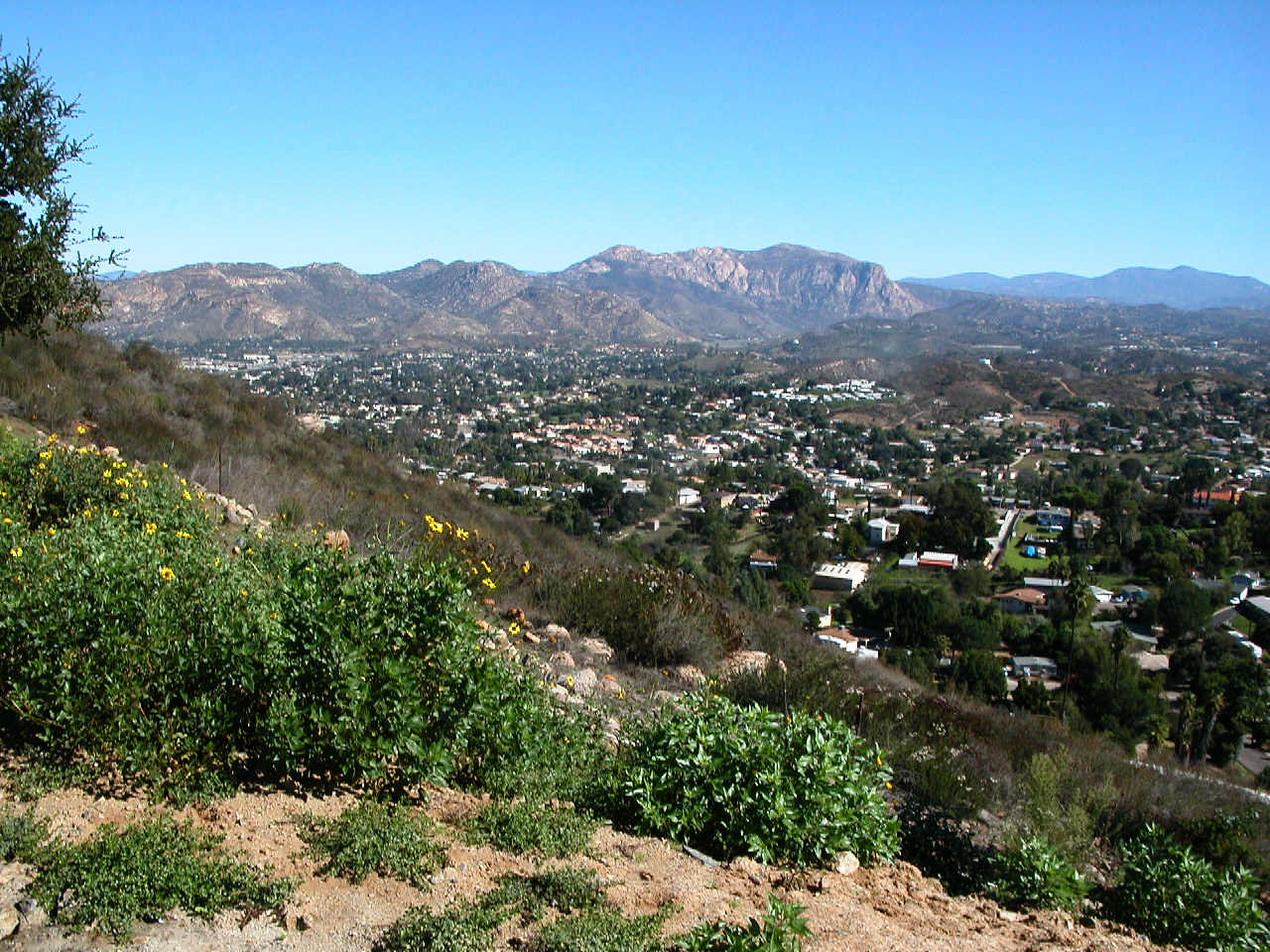
El Capitan

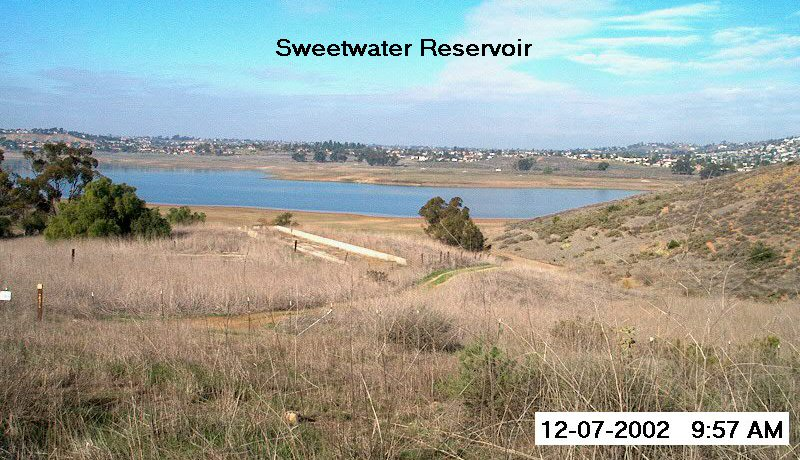
Sweetwater Reservoir

== See also ==
- South Bay
- North County
- Mountain Empire
