= Dehesa, California =

Unincorporated community in California, United States

Coordinates: 32.781442°N 116.853079°W

Dehesa is a populated place in San Diego County, California. Dehesa is located along the Sweetwater River and Dehesa Valley between Harbison Canyon, Crest, Alpine, and Granite Hills.

Dehesa is a mainly agricultural community. It is served by the Dehesa School District, which consists of one school serving grades kindergarten through 8. It is located in the 53rd Congressional District of California.

The reservation of the Sycuan Band of the Kumeyaay Nation runs along the border of Dehesa. Dehesa is also the home of the Sycuan Casino.
