= Laguna Fire =

1970 wildfire in Southern California

- Date: September 22, 1970 –; October 3, 1970; (12 days)
- Location: San Diego County, California, United States
- Coordinates: 32°46′57.56″N 116°42′32.89″W

Statistics
- Burned area: 175,425 acres (70,992 ha; 274 sq mi; 710 km^{2})

Impacts
- Structures destroyed: ~1,382 (382 homes, ~1,000 other structures)

Ignition
- Cause: Downed powerlines

The Laguna Fire, also known as the Kitchen Creek Fire or the Boulder Oaks Fire, was an extremely large 175,425-acre (70,992 ha) wildfire that burned from September 22 to October 4, 1970, in the Laguna Mountains and East County region of San Diego County in Southern California. It was one of many wildfires in a massive conflagration that spanned across the state from September 22 to October 4, 1970. At the time, it was the second-largest fire in the recorded history of California after the 1932 Matilija Fire (not counting the Santiago Canyon Fire in 1889, which experts estimate burned approximately 300,000 acres (120,000 ha)).

== Progression ==
The Laguna Fire was started by downed power lines during Santa Ana winds in the Kitchen Creek area of the Laguna Mountains on the morning of September 26, 1970. In only 30 hours, it burned westward about 32 miles (51 km) to the outskirts of El Cajon and Spring Valley. The fire devastated the communities of Harbison Canyon and Crest. In the end, the fire burned 175,425 acres (709.92 km^{2}) before it was contained on October 3, 1970.

== Effects ==
The Laguna Fire remained among the twenty largest California wildfires until as late as 2020, fifty years later, but it was surpassed by larger, more recent fires and no longer ranks among them.

Cal Fire records the Laguna Fire as having destroyed 382 structures, but reporting by The San Diego Union-Tribune indicates that that figure accounts only for the number of homes destroyed, with more than 1,000 additional structures (such as outbuildings or commercial buildings) lost.

Additionally, Cal Fire lists a death toll of five for the Laguna Fire, while the Union-Tribune reports that eight civilians died, but were never identified and were believed to have been undocumented immigrants.

== See also ==
- List of California wildfires
