= Flinn Springs, California =

Unincorporated community in California, United States

Coordinates: 32°51′18″N 116°51′09″W

Flinn Springs is an unincorporated community in the East County region of San Diego County, California.

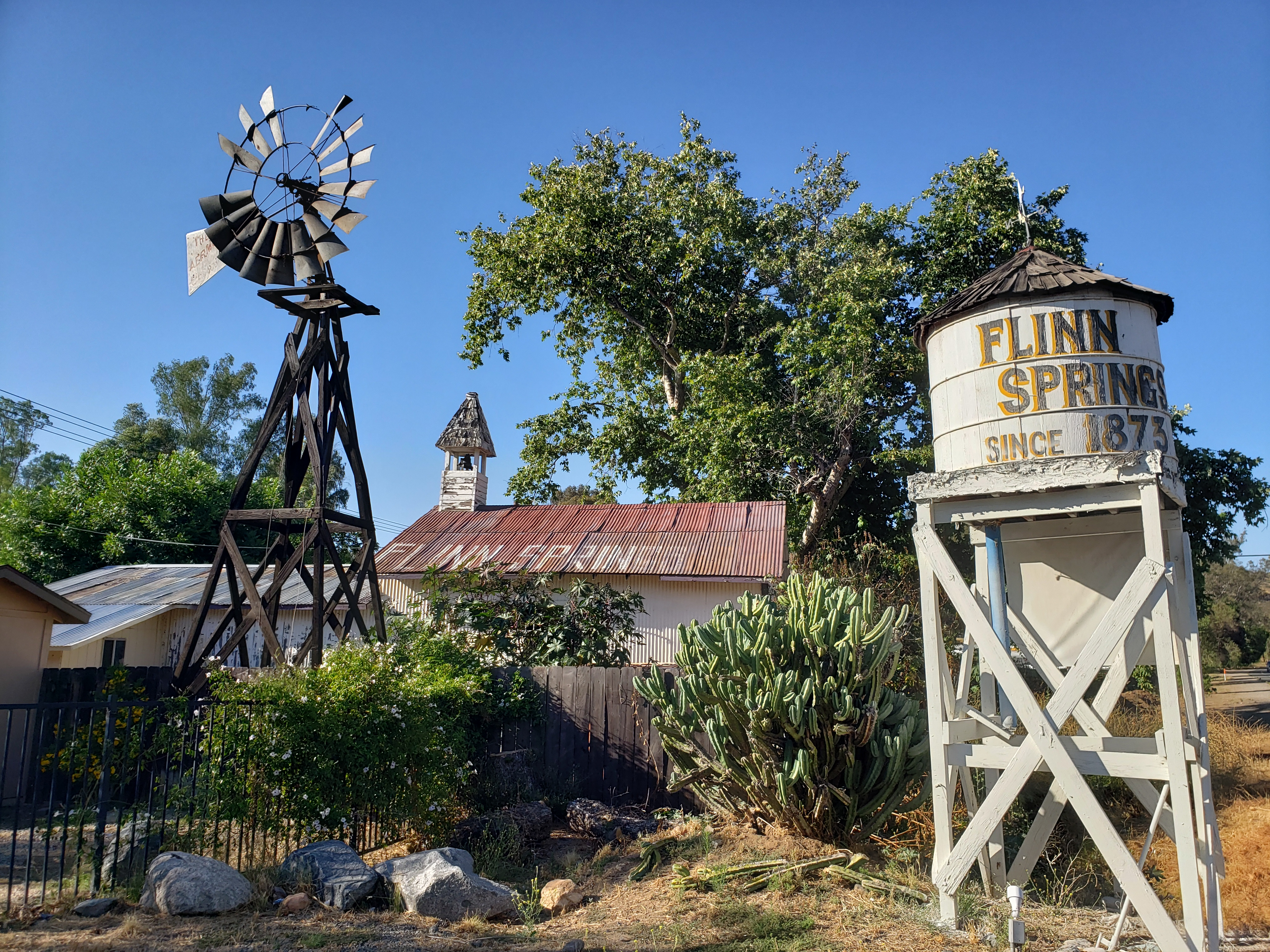
Old buildings in Flinn Springs

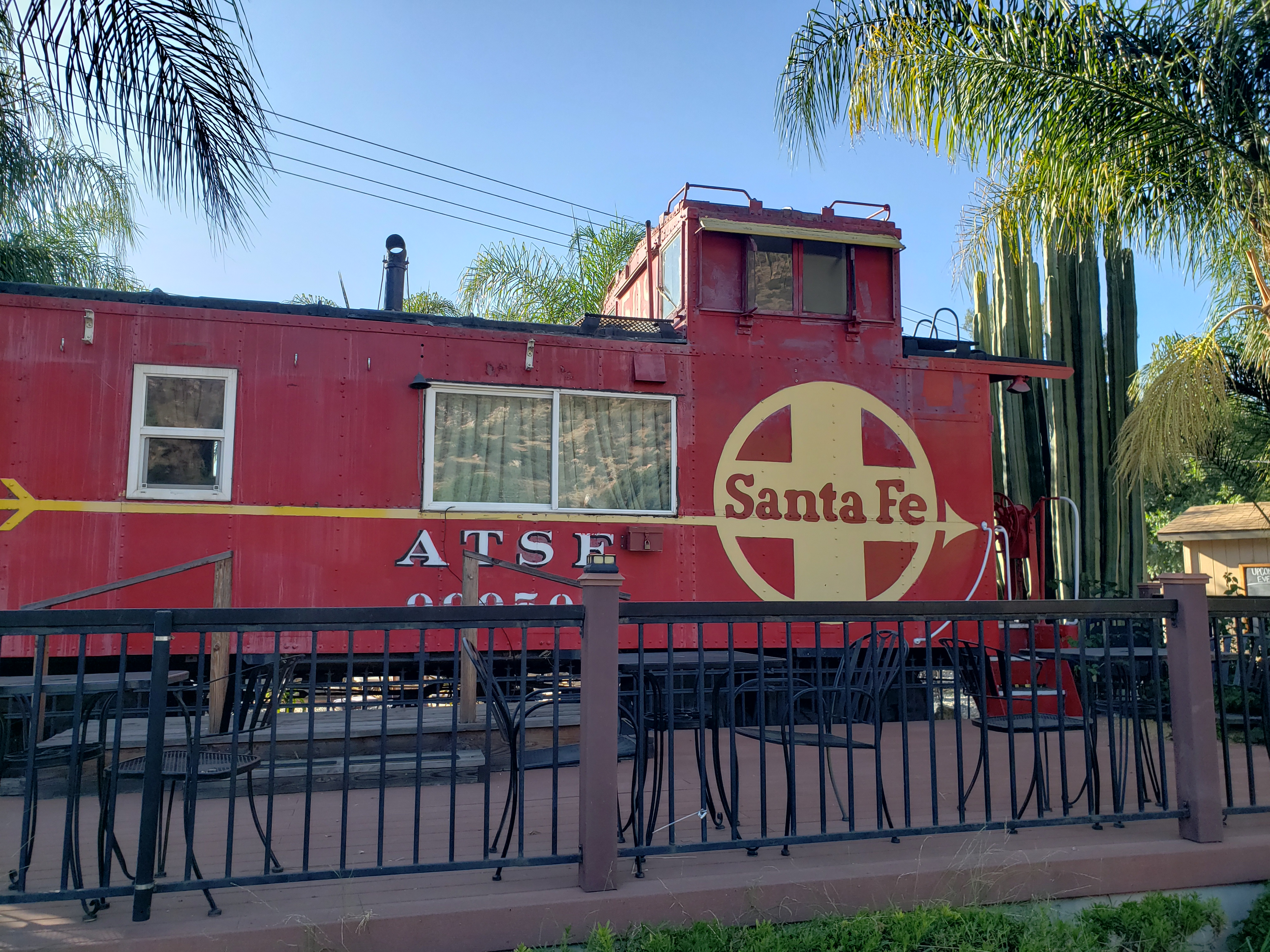
Atchison, Topeka and Santa Fe Railway car in Flinn Springs

== History ==
Flinn Springs is named for early settler James Ebenezer Flinn, a native of Missouri who moved to the area and established a farm prior to 1874. Sometimes Flinn's father, Dr. William E. Flinn, is credited as the founder of Flinn Springs instead. The settlement was also known as "La Viñita" (Spanish for "the little vineyard") because the Flinns made and sold wine at their farm.

== Geography ==
Flinn Springs straddles Interstate 8, which runs from east to west through the region. U.S. Route 80 passed through Flinn Springs from 1926 until the route was decommissioned in California in 1964. The historic highway continues to serve as the community's main thoroughfare.

Flinn Springs neighbors Lakeside to the west, Harbison Canyon to the south, and Alpine to the east. The community sits at an elevation of 1,063 feet.
