= East County (disambiguation) =

East County, San Diego is a region in San Diego County, California, U.S.

East County may also refer to:

- Łódź East County, a county in Poland
- East County, a sub-area of Contra Costa County, California, U.S.
