= Jamul, California =

Jamul
- Census designated place
- Location in San Diego County and the state of California

- Location within San Diego County Location within California Location within the United States
- Coordinates: 32°43′36″N 116°52′56″W
- Country: United States
- State: California
- County: San Diego

Area
  - Total: 16.833 sq mi (43.598 km^{2})
  - Land: 16.833 sq mi (43.598 km^{2})
  - Water: 0 sq mi (0 km^{2}) 0%
- Elevation: 997 ft (304 m)

Population (April 1, 2020)
  - Total: 6,179
  - Density: 367.1/sq mi (141.7/km^{2})
- Time zone: UTC-8 (Pacific)
  - Summer (DST): UTC-7 (PDT)
- ZIP code: 91935
- Area code: 619
- FIPS code: 06-37120
- GNIS feature ID: 1652730

Jamul (/hɑːˈmuːl/; Kumeyaay: Ha-mul, meaning "sweet water") is a census-designated place (CDP) in San Diego County, California, United States. Jamul had a population of 6,179 at the 2020 census, up from 6,163 at the 2010 census.

Jamul suffered from the Valley Fire, one of the 2020 California wildfires.

== Geography ==
According to the United States Census Bureau, the Jamul census-designated place (CDP) has a total area of 16.8 square miles (44 km^{2}), all land.

== Demographics ==
Historical population
Census	Pop.	Note	%±
1980	1,826		—
1990	2,258		23.7%
2000	5,920		162.2%
2010	6,163		4.1%
2020	6,179		0.3%
U.S. Decennial Census; 1860–1870 1880-1890; 1900 1910 1920; 1930 1940 1950; 1960 1970 1980; 1990 2000 2010; 2020

Jamul was first listed as a census designated place in the 1980 U.S. census.

=== Racial and ethnic composition ===
Jamul CDP, California – Racial and ethnic composition Note: the US Census treats Hispanic/Latino as an ethnic category. This table excludes Latinos from the racial categories and assigns them to a separate category. Hispanics/Latinos may be of any race.
Race / Ethnicity (NH = Non-Hispanic)	Pop 2000	Pop 2010	Pop 2020	% 2000	% 2010	% 2020
White alone (NH)	4,602	4,520	4,206	77.74%	73.34%	68.07%
Black or African American alone (NH)	119	120	81	2.01%	1.95%	1.31%
Native American or Alaska Native alone (NH)	13	17	18	0.22%	0.28%	0.29%
Asian alone (NH)	177	145	144	2.99%	2.35%	2.33%
Native Hawaiian or Pacific Islander alone (NH)	13	10	9	0.22%	0.16%	0.15%
Other race alone (NH)	15	10	29	0.25%	0.16%	0.47%
Mixed race or Multiracial (NH)	166	153	283	2.80%	2.48%	4.58%
Hispanic or Latino (any race)	815	1,188	1,409	13.77%	19.28%	22.80%
Total	5,920	6,163	6,179	100.00%	100.00%	100.00%

=== 2020 census ===
As of the 2020 census, Jamul had a population of 6,179 and a population density of 367.1 inhabitants per square mile (141.7/km^{2}).

The age distribution was 19.2% under the age of 18, 8.7% aged 18 to 24, 19.9% aged 25 to 44, 29.8% aged 45 to 64, and 22.5% who were 65 years of age or older. The median age was 47.0 years. For every 100 females there were 99.5 males, and for every 100 females age 18 and over there were 97.2 males age 18 and over.

The census reported that 98.2% of the population lived in households, 0.5% lived in non-institutionalized group quarters, and 1.3% were institutionalized. 52.5% of residents lived in urban areas, while 47.5% lived in rural areas.

There were 1,972 households in Jamul, of which 30.3% had children under the age of 18 living in them. Of all households, 70.4% were married-couple households, 3.1% were cohabiting couple households, 14.8% had a female householder with no spouse or partner present, and 11.8% had a male householder with no spouse or partner present. About 13.6% of all households were made up of individuals and 7.9% had someone living alone who was 65 years of age or older. The average household size was 3.08. There were 1,622 families (82.3% of all households).

There were 2,042 housing units at an average density of 121.3 units per square mile (46.8 units/km^{2}), of which 1,972 (96.6%) were occupied and 3.4% were vacant. Of occupied units, 87.8% were owner-occupied and 12.2% were occupied by renters. The homeowner vacancy rate was 0.7% and the rental vacancy rate was 2.8%.

=== Demographic estimates ===
In 2023, the US Census Bureau estimated that 15.4% of the population were foreign-born. Of all people aged 5 or older, 70.6% spoke only English at home, 17.0% spoke Spanish, 0.3% spoke other Indo-European languages, 2.4% spoke Asian or Pacific Islander languages, and 9.7% spoke other languages. Of those aged 25 or older, 93.4% were high school graduates and 34.3% had a bachelor's degree.

=== Income and poverty ===
The median household income in 2023 was $148,740, and the per capita income was $55,905. About 4.2% of families and 3.7% of the population were below the poverty line.

=== 2010 census ===
At the 2010 census Jamul had a population of 6,163. The population density was 366.1 inhabitants per square mile (141.4/km^{2}). The racial makeup of Jamul was 5,300 (86.0%) White, 127 (2.1%) African American, 28 (0.5%) Native American, 146 (2.4%) Asian, 10 (0.2%) Pacific Islander, 294 (4.8%) from other races, and 258 (4.2%) from two or more races. Hispanic or Latino of any race were 1,188 persons (19.3%).

The census reported that 6,105 people (99.1% of the population) lived in households, 18 (0.3%) lived in non-institutionalized group quarters, and 40 (0.6%) were institutionalized.

There were 1,906 households, 727 (38.1%) had children under the age of 18 living in them, 1,409 (73.9%) were opposite-sex married couples living together, 136 (7.1%) had a female householder with no husband present, 101 (5.3%) had a male householder with no wife present. There were 68 (3.6%) unmarried opposite-sex partnerships, and 28 (1.5%) same-sex married couples or partnerships. 187 households (9.8%) were one person and 84 (4.4%) had someone living alone who was 65 or older. The average household size was 3.20. There were 1,646 families (86.4% of households); the average family size was 3.38.

The age distribution was 1,396 people (22.7%) under the age of 18, 585 people (9.5%) aged 18 to 24, 1,161 people (18.8%) aged 25 to 44, 2,198 people (35.7%) aged 45 to 64, and 823 people (13.4%) who were 65 or older. The median age was 44.4 years. For every 100 females, there were 101.0 males. For every 100 females age 18 and over, there were 99.1 males.

There were 1,974 housing units at an average density of 117.3 per square mile, of the occupied units 1,692 (88.8%) were owner-occupied and 214 (11.2%) were rented. The homeowner vacancy rate was 0.9%; the rental vacancy rate was 2.7%. 5,404 people (87.7% of the population) lived in owner-occupied housing units and 701 people (11.4%) lived in rental housing units.

== Casino Controversy ==
In 1999, the Tipai Band of Kumeyaay Indians, with 64 members living on 6 acres (24,000 m^{2}) of sovereign land in the Jamul area designated the Jamul Indian Village, announced their intent to develop a new hotel and casino.

There was some opposition. The chief concern was the increased traffic on the main road through the town, Highway 94. The location was such that all the traffic to and from the proposed casino would likely pass through the middle of the town.

In spite of the opposition, the tribe went ahead with the casino. Penn National Gaming became the developer, lender and manager of a $400 million Hollywood Casino in collaboration with the Jamul Indian Village. Hollywood Casino Jamul-San Diego opened on October 10, 2016. The casino included a three-story gaming and entertainment facility of approximately 200,000 square feet, featuring over 1,700 slot machines, 40 live table games, multiple restaurants, bars and lounges and an enclosed below-grade parking structure with approximately 1,800 spaces.

== Politics ==
In the California State Senate, Jamul is located in the 18th senatorial district, represented by Democrat Steve Padilla. In the California State Assembly, Jamul is in the 75th Assembly district, represented by Republican Carl DeMaio.

In the United States House of Representatives, Jamul is in California's 48th congressional district, represented by Republican Darrell Issa.
