= Eucalyptus Hills, California =

Eucalyptus Hills
- census-designated place
- Location of Eucalyptus Hills in San Diego County, California.

- Position in California.
- Coordinates: 32°52′46″N 116°56′36″W
- Country: United States
- State: California
- County: San Diego

Area
  - Total: 4.773 sq mi (12.363 km^{2})
  - Land: 4.758 sq mi (12.324 km^{2})
  - Water: 0.015 sq mi (0.039 km^{2}) 0.31%
- Elevation: 627 ft (191 m)

Population (2020)
  - Total: 5,517
  - Density: 1,159/sq mi (447.7/km^{2})
- Time zone: UTC-8 (Pacific (PST))
  - Summer (DST): UTC-7 (PDT)
- ZIP code: 92040
- GNIS feature ID: 2628813

Eucalyptus Hills is a census-designated place in the East County region of San Diego County, California. Eucalyptus Hills sits at an elevation of 627 feet (191 m). The 2020 United States census reported Eucalyptus Hills's population as 5,517, up from 5,313 in the 2010 census.

== Geography ==
According to the United States Census Bureau, the CDP covers an area of 4.8 square miles (12.4 km^{2}), 99.69% of it land and 0.31% of it water.

== Demographics ==
Historical population
Census	Pop.	Note	%±
2010	5,313		—
2020	5,517		3.8%
U.S. Decennial Census; 1860–1870 1880-1890; 1900 1910 1920; 1930 1940 1950; 1960 1970 1980; 1990 2000 2010; 2020

Eucalyptus Hills first appeared as a census designated place in the 2010 U.S. census.

=== Racial and ethnic composition ===
Eucalyptus Hills CDP, California – Racial and ethnic composition Note: the US Census treats Hispanic/Latino as an ethnic category. This table excludes Latinos from the racial categories and assigns them to a separate category. Hispanics/Latinos may be of any race.
Race / Ethnicity (NH = Non-Hispanic)	Pop 2010	Pop 2020	% 2010	% 2020
White alone (NH)	4,068	3,785	76.57%	68.61%
Black or African American alone (NH)	177	291	3.33%	5.27%
Native American or Alaska Native alone (NH)	39	23	0.73%	0.42%
Asian alone (NH)	84	91	1.58%	1.65%
Native Hawaiian or Pacific Islander alone (NH)	6	8	0.11%	0.15%
Other race alone (NH)	7	38	0.13%	0.69%
Mixed race or Multiracial (NH)	150	311	2.82%	5.64%
Hispanic or Latino (any race)	782	970	14.72%	17.58%
Total	5,313	5,517	100.00%	100.00%

=== 2020 census ===
As of the 2020 census, Eucalyptus Hills had a population of 5,517. The population density was 1,159.5 inhabitants per square mile (447.7/km^{2}). The entire population lived in households. Additionally, 98.2% of residents lived in urban areas, while 1.8% lived in rural areas.

The age distribution was 24.3% under the age of 18, 6.9% aged 18 to 24, 24.2% aged 25 to 44, 25.8% aged 45 to 64, and 18.8% who were 65 years of age or older. The median age was 40.0 years. For every 100 females, there were 104.9 males, and for every 100 females age 18 and over, there were 105.3 males age 18 and over.

There were 1,836 households, of which 36.1% had children under the age of 18 living in them. Of all households, 62.1% were married-couple households, 3.6% were cohabiting couple households, 18.6% had a female householder with no spouse or partner present, and 15.6% had a male householder with no spouse or partner present. About 16.2% of all households were made up of individuals, and 9.8% had someone living alone who was 65 years of age or older. There were 1,468 families (80.0% of all households).

There were 1,879 housing units at an average density of 394.9 units per square mile (152.5 units/km^{2}), of which 1,836 (97.7%) were occupied and 2.3% were vacant. Of the occupied units, 72.8% were owner-occupied and 27.2% were occupied by renters. The homeowner vacancy rate was 0.2%, and the rental vacancy rate was 2.9%.
