= Bostonia, California =

- Neighborhood of El Cajon (partial); Unincorporated area and CDP (partial)
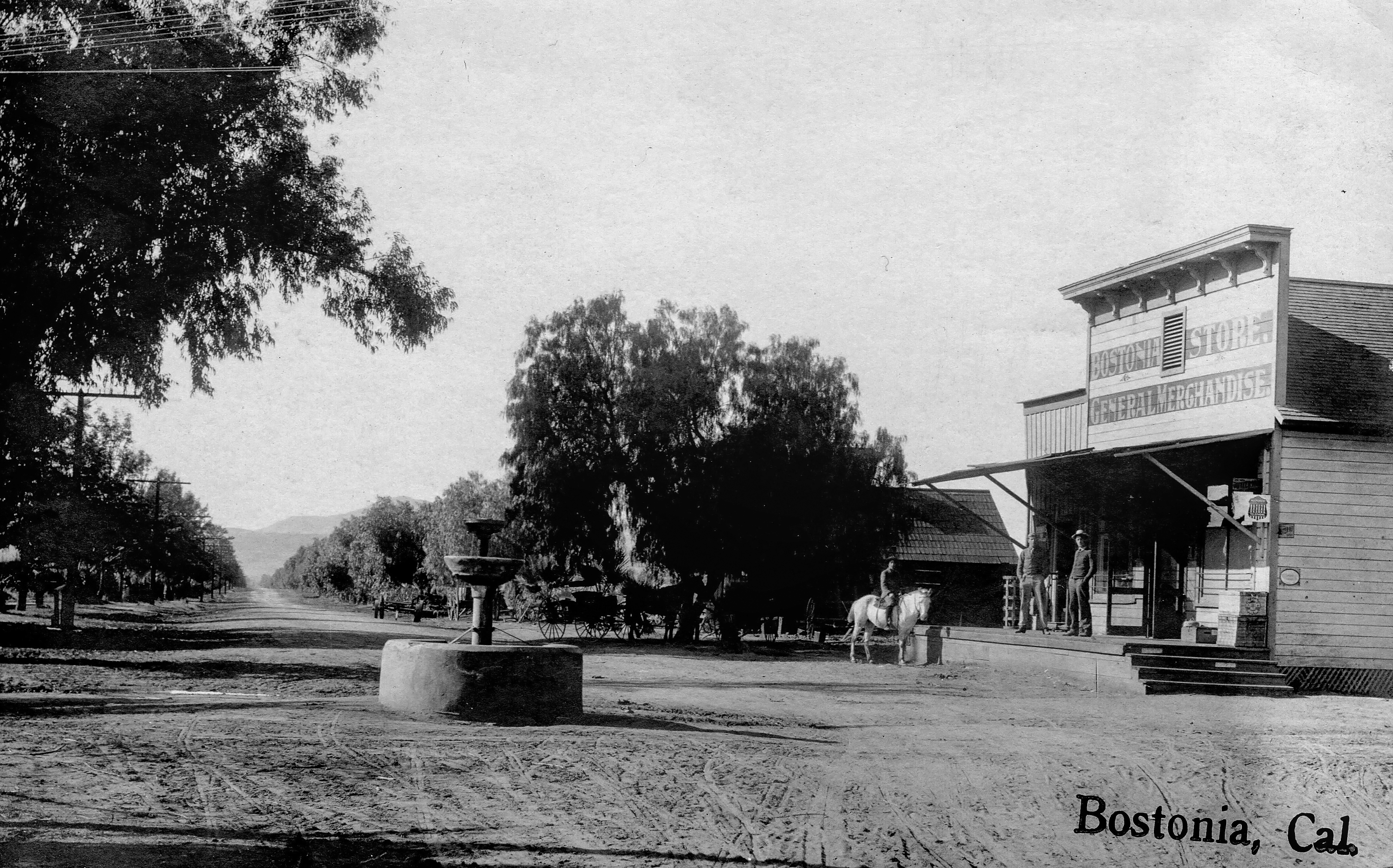
- Bostonia Store in the early 20th century, at 2nd & Broadway. The store was established in 1886, and closed in February 1960.
- Interactive map of the unincorporated areas of Bostonia
- Location in California Location in the United States
- Coordinates: 32°49′8″N 116°57′37″W
- Country: United States
- State: California
- County: San Diego

Area
  - Total: 1.93 sq mi (4.99 km^{2})
  - Land: 1.93 sq mi (4.99 km^{2})
  - Water: 0 sq mi (0.00 km^{2}) 0%
- Elevation: 486 ft (148 m)

Population (2020)
  - Total: 16,882
  - Density: 8,763.8/sq mi (3,383.73/km^{2})
- Time zone: UTC-8 (Pacific)
  - Summer (DST): UTC-7 (PDT)
- ZIP code: 92021
- Area code: 619
- FIPS code: 06-07624
- GNIS feature IDs: 1656442, 2407889

Bostonia is a neighborhood in San Diego County, California. Parts of it is within the northeastern portion of the city of El Cajon, while its other parts lie within an adjacent unincorporated area. The portion of Bostonia that lies within the unincorporated area is classified as a census-designated place (CDP) by the United States Census Bureau. The population of the CDP was 16,882 at the 2020 census, up from 15,379 at the 2010 census.

== History ==
=== Agriculture ===
Former Virginia agriculturalist Eugene Halstead of San Diego planted a crop of tobacco in Bostonia in 1896 and said later that the tobacco was "superior in some respects to that of the Cuban plantations," one "serious drawback" to cultivation being the scarcity of rain in the area.

=== Civic events ===
In 1898, David G. Gordon was appointed postmaster in Bostonia to replace Joseph Donald, who had resigned. C.O. Graves held the office in 1903. In 1914, William M. Wright was appointed postmaster to replace R.W. Foffland, who had resigned.

In 1928, Murray Wright was president of the Bostonia Chamber of Commerce.

In that same year, civic leaders in Bostonia planned to name a local observation as "Grape Day" which led some in neighboring Escondido to complain that their city already had an event under the same name. They were mollified when Bostonians said they would call their event "Home Products Day" instead.

=== Crime ===
"Firebugs" believed by Sheriff Conklin to have been members of the Industrial Workers of the World, "German sympathizers" or "disgruntled employees," torched the Meridian School building, a large packing house and two stables of the Bostonia Fruit Growers and Packers Association on October 6, 1917. Waste soaked in oil or phosphorus was found in what remained of the buildings, which burned to the ground.

==== Shoot-out ====
Sheriff's deputies engaged in a short gun battle in Bostonia and captured a suicidal man who had threatened a bank in Lakeside, California, with ten pounds of dynamite and fled with his loot.

=== Annexation ===
In May 1953 residents of the southern portion of Bostonia approved annexation to the city of El Cajon, California, by a vote of 315 to 271.

=== Swap meet ===
In 1981 a group of Bostonia residents organized to complain about the disruption caused by historic El Cajon Swap Meet, reputedly the "granddaddy of all the nation's swap meets". They said the weekend operation had grown beyond the "small-time affair it once was," turning the usually quiet area into a "mob scene."

=== Fire district and fires ===
A petition was submitted in 1977 by owners of 112 acres within the 480-acre Bostonia Fire Protection District to secede and join the Santee district. It was denied by the Local Agency Formation Commission.

In 1986, a fire in nearby El Cajon killed two and injured five residents at a home for the aged despite the fact that it broke out only a hundred yards from a station within the Bostonia Fire Protection District.

The Bostonia firefighters were prevented from battling the blaze because the district had no mutual-aid agreement with El Cajon, whose firefighters arrived three minutes after the fire was reported. El Cajon Fire Chief Art Melbourne said that Bostonia firefighters did give help but declined to say exactly what it was.

El Cajon Fire Chief Roger House said that Bostonia was not part of any agreement because it did not meet the requirements for belonging, including round-the-clock staffing and a certain kind of equipment.

== Geography ==
The center of the community is near the intersection of North 2nd Street and Broadway in the city of El Cajon. Bostonia Street, the Bostonia Post Office, the former Bostonia Ballroom, Bostonia Elementary School and the Bostonia Fire Station are all within 2,000 feet (610 m) of this location and all, except the fire station, are within the city of El Cajon. This is the area identified on most maps as Bostonia. However, the census-designated place of Bostonia is entirely outside the city limits of El Cajon, in an unincorporated area of County. The CDP comprises most of unincorporated El Cajon north of Broadway and east of State Route 67, and a small area west of State Route 67. Mail sent to all parts of Bostonia is addressed to El Cajon.

According to the United States Census Bureau Bostonia is located at 32°49′18″N 116°57′0″W (32.821612, -116.949905). This is approximately one mile northwest of where the USGS places Bostonia, near the geographic center of the CDP. The CDP has a total area of 1.9 square miles (4.9 km^{2}), all land.

=== Ecology ===
Bostonia was home to numerous populations of Ambrosia pumila, a rare, clonal plant narrowly distributed in southern California and Baja California. Most populations of Ambrosia pumila in Bostonia grew on vacant lots, backyard strips, and gravel roads, and many since have been extirpated by development. Additionally, Artemisia palmeri, a sagebrush nearly endemic to San Diego County, was once found in the neighborhood. Other plants historically collected from Bostonia include Primula clevelandii, Sidalcea malviflora, Sisyrinchium bellum and Viola pedunculata.

== Demographics ==
Historical population
Census	Pop.	Note	%±
1990	13,670		—
2000	15,169		11.0%
2010	15,379		1.4%
2020	16,882		9.8%
U.S. Decennial Census; 1860–1870 1880-1890; 1900 1910 1920; 1930 1940 1950; 1960 1970 1980; 1990 2000 2010; 2020

Bostonia first appeared as a census designated place in the 1990 U.S. Census. In 2000, the GDP both gained and lost territory. A small portion of Bostonia was annexed to the city of El Cajon prior to the 2010 U.S. Census. The statistics below do not include the portions annexed to El Cajon primarily in 1953. The population has remained relatively stable since it became a CDP in 1990.

=== Racial and ethnic composition ===
Bostonia CDP, California – Racial and ethnic composition Note: the US Census treats Hispanic/Latino as an ethnic category. This table excludes Latinos from the racial categories and assigns them to a separate category. Hispanics/Latinos may be of any race.
Race / Ethnicity (NH = Non-Hispanic)	Pop 2000	Pop 2010	Pop 2020	% 2000	% 2010	% 2020
White alone (NH)	11,103	9,252	8,393	73.20%	60.16%	49.72%
Black or African American alone (NH)	574	954	1,066	3.78%	6.20%	6.31%
Native American or Alaska Native alone (NH)	100	67	50	0.66%	0.44%	0.30%
Asian alone (NH)	211	358	522	1.39%	2.33%	3.09%
Native Hawaiian or Pacific Islander alone (NH)	48	79	81	0.32%	0.51%	0.48%
Other race alone (NH)	27	24	112	0.18%	0.16%	0.66%
Mixed race or Multiracial (NH)	583	704	955	3.84%	4.58%	5.66%
Hispanic or Latino (any race)	2,523	3,941	5,703	16.63%	25.63%	33.78%
Total	15,169	15,379	16,882	100.00%	100.00%	100.00%

=== 2020 census ===
As of the 2020 census, Bostonia had a population of 16,882. The population density was 8,765.3 inhabitants per square mile (3,384.3/km^{2}).

The age distribution was 24.9% under the age of 18, 9.0% aged 18 to 24, 28.3% aged 25 to 44, 24.4% aged 45 to 64, and 13.5% who were 65 years of age or older. The median age was 35.4 years. For every 100 females, there were 93.8 males, and for every 100 females age 18 and over there were 91.6 males age 18 and over.

The census reported that 99.4% of the population lived in households, 0.3% lived in non-institutionalized group quarters, and 0.3% were institutionalized. 100.0% of residents lived in urban areas, while 0.0% lived in rural areas.

There were 5,742 households, out of which 36.5% had children under the age of 18 living in them. Of all households, 44.8% were married-couple households, 7.9% were cohabiting couple households, 29.2% had a female householder with no spouse or partner present, and 18.1% had a male householder with no spouse or partner present. 21.9% of households were one-person households, and 10.1% had someone living alone who was 65 years of age or older. The average household size was 2.92. There were 4,061 families (70.7% of all households).

There were 5,945 housing units at an average density of 3,086.7 units per square mile (1,191.8 units/km^{2}), of which 5,742 (96.6%) were occupied. Of occupied units, 43.3% were owner-occupied and 56.7% were renter-occupied. Of all housing units, 3.4% were vacant; the homeowner vacancy rate was 1.3% and the rental vacancy rate was 3.3%.

=== Income and poverty ===
In 2023, the US Census Bureau estimated that the median household income was $73,549, and the per capita income was $32,959. About 13.1% of families and 15.4% of the population were below the poverty line.

=== 2010 census ===
At the 2010 census Bostonia had a population of 15,379. The population density was 7,973.4 inhabitants per square mile (3,078.5/km^{2}). The racial makeup of Bostonia was 10,891 (70.8%) White, 1,011 (6.6%) African American, 102 (0.7%) Native American, 375 (2.4%) Asian, 89 (0.6%) Pacific Islander, 1,781 (11.6%) from other races, and 1,130 (7.3%) from two or more races. Hispanic or Latino of any race were 3,941 persons (25.6%).

The census reported that 15,272 people (99.3% of the population) lived in households, 55 (0.4%) lived in non-institutionalized group quarters, and 52 (0.3%) were institutionalized.

There were 5,573 households, 2,028 (36.4%) had children under the age of 18 living in them, 2,381 (42.7%) were opposite-sex married couples living together, 976 (17.5%) had a female householder with no husband present, 405 (7.3%) had a male householder with no wife present. There were 416 (7.5%) unmarried opposite-sex partnerships, and 47 (0.8%) same-sex married couples or partnerships. 1,338 households (24.0%) were one person and 545 (9.8%) had someone living alone who was 65 or older. The average household size was 2.74. There were 3,762 families (67.5% of households); the average family size was 3.25.

The age distribution was 3,813 people (24.8%) under the age of 18, 1,820 people (11.8%) aged 18 to 24, 4,157 people (27.0%) aged 25 to 44, 3,832 people (24.9%) aged 45 to 64, and 1,757 people (11.4%) who were 65 or older. The median age was 33.8 years. For every 100 females, there were 94.6 males. For every 100 females age 18 and over, there were 90.9 males.

There were 5,893 housing units at an average density of 3,055.3 per square mile, of the occupied units 2,342 (42.0%) were owner-occupied and 3,231 (58.0%) were rented. The homeowner vacancy rate was 2.9%; the rental vacancy rate was 5.5%. 6,071 people (39.5% of the population) lived in owner-occupied housing units and 9,201 people (59.8%) lived in rental housing units.

=== Religion ===
A new Episcopal Church (United States) was dedicated in Bostonia on July 28, 1895, the Rev. H.B. Restarick officiating. Later, Alfred Fletcher took charge of the church under Restarick, who had become dean. W.J. Cleveland took over as rector in November 1910.

== Government ==
In the California State Legislature, Bostonia is in the 39th senatorial district, represented by Democrat Akilah Weber Pierson, and in the 75th Assembly district, represented by Republican Carl DeMaio.

In the United States House of Representatives, Bostonia is in California's 48th congressional district, represented by Republican Darrell Issa.

== Education ==
The Riverview School District was separated from the Bostonia District (which included Lakeside) in 1919.
