= Winter Gardens, California =

- Unincorporated Community; Census Designated Place
- Interactive map of Winter Gardens, California
- Location in the United States Winter Gardens, California (California) Winter Gardens, California (the United States)
- Coordinates: 32°50′28″N 116°55′40″W
- Country: United States
- State: California
- County: San Diego

Area
  - Total: 4.42 sq mi (11.45 km^{2})
  - Land: 4.42 sq mi (11.45 km^{2})
  - Water: 0 sq mi (0 km^{2}) 0%
- Elevation: 676 ft (206 m)

Population (2020)
  - Total: 22,380
  - Density: 5,062/sq mi (1,955/km^{2})
- Time zone: UTC-8 (PST)
  - Summer (DST): UTC-7 (PDT)
- ZIP code: 92040
- Area code: 619
- FIPS code: 06-85992
- GNIS feature ID: 1656662

Winter Gardens is a census-designated place (CDP) in San Diego County, California. The population was 22,380 at the 2020 census, up from 20,631 at the 2010 census.

== Geography ==
According to the United States Census Bureau, the CDP has a total area of 4.4 square miles (11 km^{2}), 99.98% of it land and 0.02% of it water.

== Demographics ==
Historical population
Census	Pop.	Note	%±
2000	19,771		—
2010	20,631		4.3%
2020	22,380		8.5%
U.S. Decennial Census; 1860–1870 1880-1890; 1900 1910 1920; 1930 1940 1950; 1960 1970 1980; 1990 2000 2010; 2020

Winter Gardens first appeared as a census designated place in the 2000 U.S. census created from part of Lakeside CDP.

=== Racial and ethnic composition ===
Winter Gardens CDP, California – Racial and ethnic composition Note: the US Census treats Hispanic/Latino as an ethnic category. This table excludes Latinos from the racial categories and assigns them to a separate category. Hispanics/Latinos may be of any race.
Race / ethnicity (NH = Non-Hispanic)	Pop 2000	Pop 2010	Pop 2020	% 2000	% 2010	% 2020
White alone (NH)	16,139	14,782	13,613	81.63%	71.65%	60.83%
Black or African American alone (NH)	245	372	519	1.24%	1.80%	2.32%
Native American or Alaska Native alone (NH)	158	157	127	0.80%	0.76%	0.57%
Asian alone (NH)	256	314	562	1.29%	1.52%	2.51%
Native Hawaiian or Pacific Islander alone (NH)	44	84	73	0.22%	0.41%	0.33%
Other race alone (NH)	26	6	143	0.13%	0.03%	0.64%
Mixed race or Multiracial (NH)	479	627	1,353	2.42%	3.04%	6.05%
Hispanic or Latino (any race)	2,424	4,289	5,990	12.26%	20.79%	26.76%
Total	19,771	20,631	22,380	100.00%	100.00%	100.00%

=== 2020 census ===
As of the 2020 census, Winter Gardens had a population of 22,380 and a population density of 5,063.3 inhabitants per square mile (1,955.0/km^{2}). The census reported that 99.6% of residents lived in households, 0.3% lived in non-institutionalized group quarters, and 0.2% were institutionalized. All residents lived in urban areas.

There were 7,840 households; 33.8% had children under the age of 18, 49.3% were married-couple households, 7.6% were cohabiting couple households, 24.9% had a female householder with no partner present, and 18.2% had a male householder with no partner present. 20.5% of households were one person, and 9.8% were one person aged 65 or older. The average household size was 2.84. There were 5,630 families (71.8% of all households).

The age distribution was 23.2% under the age of 18, 8.4% aged 18 to 24, 27.2% aged 25 to 44, 26.0% aged 45 to 64, and 15.3% who were 65 years of age or older. The median age was 38.2 years. For every 100 females there were 95.5 males, and for every 100 females age 18 and over there were 92.3 males age 18 and over.

There were 8,090 housing units at an average density of 1,830.3 units per square mile (706.7 units/km^{2}), of which 7,840 (96.9%) were occupied; 58.5% were owner-occupied and 41.5% were occupied by renters. The homeowner vacancy rate was 0.7% and the rental vacancy rate was 2.8%.

=== Income ===
In 2023, the US Census Bureau estimated that the median household income was $94,320, and the per capita income was $40,960. About 5.0% of families and 9.3% of the population were below the poverty line.

=== 2010 census ===
At the 2010 census Winter Gardens had a population of 20,631. The population density was 4,656.5 inhabitants per square mile (1,797.9/km^{2}). The racial makeup of Winter Gardens was 16,845 (81.6%) White, 409 (2.0%) African American, 234 (1.1%) Native American, 345 (1.7%) Asian, 95 (0.5%) Pacific Islander, 1,616 (7.8%) from other races, and 1,087 (5.3%) from two or more races. Hispanic or Latino of any race were 4,289 persons (20.8%).

The census reported that 20,532 people (99.5% of the population) lived in households, 75 (0.4%) lived in non-institutionalized group quarters, and 24 (0.1%) were institutionalized.

There were 7,468 households, 2,759 (36.9%) had children under the age of 18 living in them, 3,696 (49.5%) were opposite-sex married couples living together, 1,050 (14.1%) had a female householder with no husband present, 509 (6.8%) had a male householder with no wife present. There were 528 (7.1%) unmarried opposite-sex partnerships, and 49 (0.7%) same-sex married couples or partnerships. 1,639 households (21.9%) were one person and 516 (6.9%) had someone living alone who was 65 or older. The average household size was 2.75. There were 5,255 families (70.4% of households); the average family size was 3.20.

The age distribution was 5,019 people (24.3%) under the age of 18, 1,996 people (9.7%) aged 18 to 24, 5,518 people (26.7%) aged 25 to 44, 5,978 people (29.0%) aged 45 to 64, and 2,120 people (10.3%) who were 65 or older. The median age was 36.8 years. For every 100 females, there were 97.4 males. For every 100 females age 18 and over, there were 95.4 males.

There were 7,885 housing units at an average density of 1,779.7 per square mile, of the occupied units 4,264 (57.1%) were owner-occupied and 3,204 (42.9%) were rented. The homeowner vacancy rate was 3.0%; the rental vacancy rate was 5.5%. 11,716 people (56.8% of the population) lived in owner-occupied housing units and 8,816 people (42.7%) lived in rental housing units.

== Government ==
In the California State Legislature, Winter Gardens is in the 40th senatorial district, represented by Republican Brian Jones, and in the 75th Assembly district, represented by Republican Carl DeMaio.

In the United States House of Representatives, Winter Gardens is in California's 48th congressional district, represented by Republican Darrell Issa.
