= Mount Laguna, California =

Mount Laguna
- census-designated place
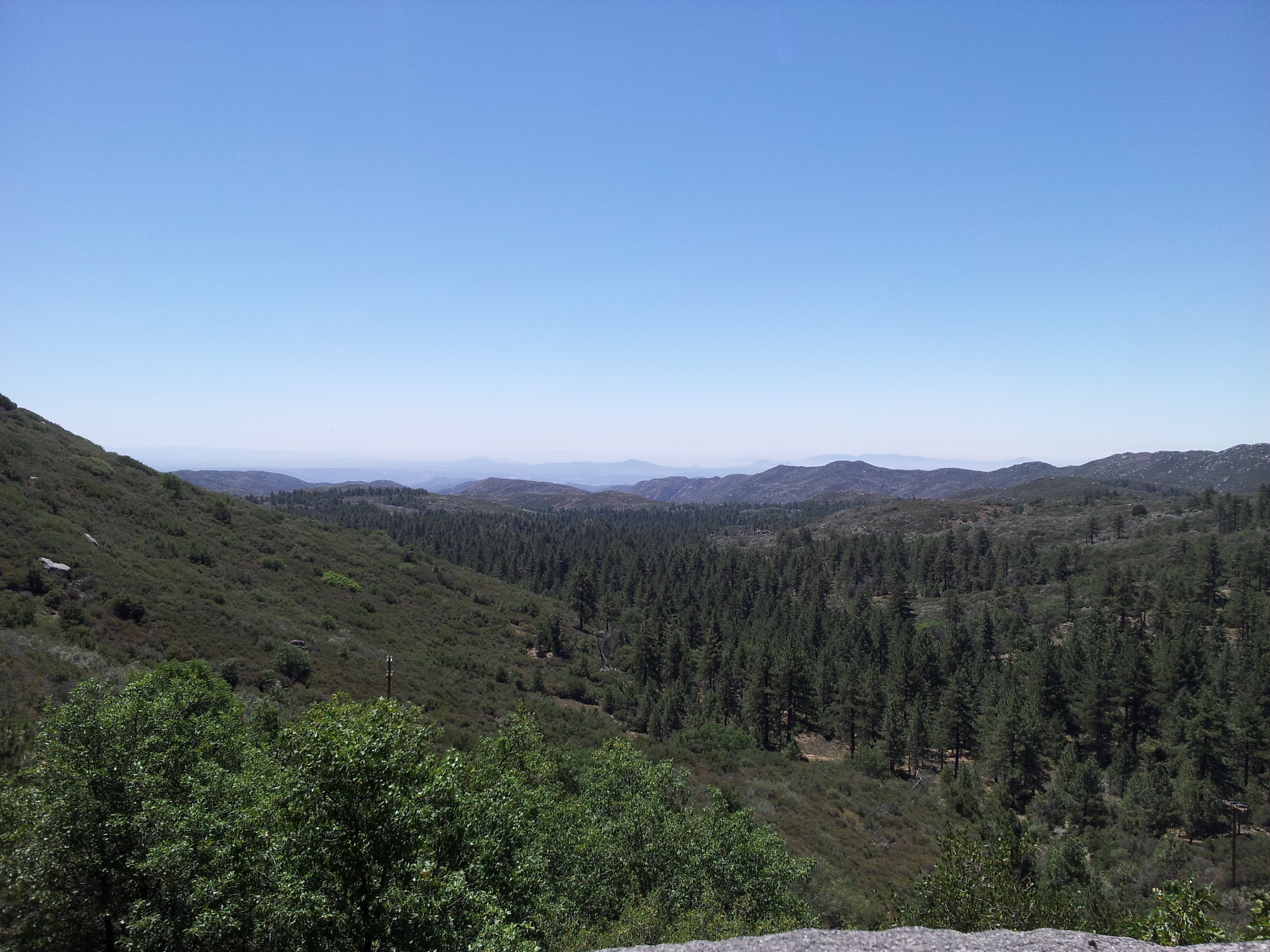
- Forest view near the town of Mount Laguna

- Location in San Diego County, California

- Location within the state of California Mount Laguna (the United States)
- Coordinates: 32°52′20″N 116°25′3″W
- Country: United States
- State: California
- County: San Diego

Area
  - Total: 1.697 sq mi (4.395 km^{2})
  - Land: 1.697 sq mi (4.395 km^{2})
  - Water: 0 sq mi (0 km^{2}) 0%
- Elevation (Note: The elevation of the CDP is 5,777 ft (1,761 m) per GNIS, but the high point (the peak) called Mount Laguna lies at an NAVD88 elevation of 6,302 ft (1,921 m).): 5,777 ft (1,761 m)

Population (2020)
  - Total: 74
  - Density: 44/sq mi (17/km^{2})
- Time zone: UTC-8 (Pacific (PST))
  - Summer (DST): UTC-7 (PDT)
- ZIP codes: 91948
- Area code: 619
- GNIS feature ID: 2628763

Mount Laguna is a small census-designated place (CDP) in San Diego County, California. It is approximately 6,000 feet (1,800 m) above sea level in a forest of Jeffrey pine, east of San Diego in the Laguna Mountains on the eastern edge of the Cleveland National Forest. The hamlet sits at the high point of a scenic drive on Sunrise Highway from Interstate 8 to Highway 79. The Mount Laguna Air Force Station was located on Mount Laguna.

Mount Laguna is on the Pacific Crest Trail. It consists of a small general store, rustic lodge and cabins, local restaurant, rural post office, and campgrounds adjacent to the trail. The Laguna Mountain Recreation Area surrounds the village, and the visitor center for the pine-covered area is located here.

The mountain backcountry of San Diego County is high enough to receive snowfall in winter months, and the Mount Laguna region offers locally-unique winter recreation in the form of snow play, sledding, and cross country skiing for several days after larger storms. The population was 74 at the 2020 census, up from 57 at the 2010 census.

The ZIP Code is 91948 and the community is inside area code 619.

== Geography ==
According to the United States Census Bureau, the CDP covers an area of 1.7 square miles (4.4 km^{2}), all of it is land.

== Climate ==
Mount Laguna has a warm Mediterranean climate, characterized by dry summers and wet winters. Mount Laguna sometimes experiences summer monsoons.

== Demographics ==
Historical population
Census	Pop.	Note	%±
2010	57		—
2020	74		29.8%
U.S. Decennial Census; 1860–1870 1880-1890; 1900 1910 1920; 1930 1940 1950; 1960 1970 1980; 1990 2000 2010; 2020

Mount Laguna first appeared as a census designated place in the 2010 U.S. census.

=== 2020 ===
Mount Laguna CDP, California – Racial and ethnic composition Note: the US Census treats Hispanic/Latino as an ethnic category. This table excludes Latinos from the racial categories and assigns them to a separate category. Hispanics/Latinos may be of any race.
Race / Ethnicity (NH = Non-Hispanic)	Pop 2010	Pop 2020	% 2010	% 2020
White alone (NH)	55	59	96.49%	79.73%
Black or African American alone (NH)	0	0	0.00%	0.00%
Native American or Alaska Native alone (NH)	0	1	0.00%	1.35%
Asian alone (NH)	1	0	1.75%	0.00%
Native Hawaiian or Pacific Islander alone (NH)	0	0	0.00%	0.00%
Other race alone (NH)	0	0	0.00%	0.00%
Mixed race or Multiracial (NH)	0	5	0.00%	6.76%
Hispanic or Latino (any race)	1	9	1.75%	12.16%
Total	57	74	100.00%	100.00%

=== 2010 ===
At the 2010 census Mount Laguna had a population of 57. The population density was 33.6 inhabitants per square mile (13.0/km^{2}). The racial makeup of Mount Laguna was 55 (96.5%) White, 0 (0.0%) African American, 0 (0.0%) Native American, 1 (1.8%) Asian, 0 (0.0%) Pacific Islander, 1 (1.8%) from other races, and 0 (0.0%) from two or more races. Hispanic or Latino of any race were 1 people (1.8%).

The whole population lived in households, no one lived in non-institutionalized group quarters and no one was institutionalized.

There were 32 households, 3 (9.4%) had children under the age of 18 living in them, 15 (46.9%) were opposite-sex married couples living together, 0 (0%) had a female householder with no husband present, 1 (3.1%) had a male householder with no wife present. There were 0 (0%) unmarried opposite-sex partnerships, and 0 (0%) same-sex married couples or partnerships. 15 households (46.9%) were one person and 9 (28.1%) had someone living alone who was 65 or older. The average household size was 1.78. There were 16 families (50.0% of households); the average family size was 2.50.

The age distribution was 4 people (7.0%) under the age of 18, 4 people (7.0%) aged 18 to 24, 3 people (5.3%) aged 25 to 44, 21 people (36.8%) aged 45 to 64, and 25 people (43.9%) who were 65 or older. The median age was 61.5 years. For every 100 females, there were 90.0 males. For every 100 females age 18 and over, there were 96.3 males.

There were 167 housing units at an average density of 98.4 per square mile, of the occupied units 25 (78.1%) were owner-occupied and 7 (21.9%) were rented. The homeowner vacancy rate was 0%; the rental vacancy rate was 12.5%. 50 people (87.7% of the population) lived in owner-occupied housing units and 7 people (12.3%) lived in rental housing units.
