= Crest, California =

- unincorporated community census-designated place
- Location in San Diego County and the state of California

- Location in the United States
- Coordinates: 32°48′21″N 116°52′3″W
- Country: United States
- State: California
- County: San Diego

Area
  - Total: 6.53 sq mi (16.91 km^{2})
  - Land: 6.53 sq mi (16.91 km^{2})
  - Water: 0 sq mi (0.00 km^{2}) 0%
- Elevation: 1,300 ft (400 m)

Population (2020)
  - Total: 2,828
  - Density: 433/sq mi (167.2/km^{2})
- Time zone: UTC-8 (PST)
  - Summer (DST): UTC-7 (PDT)
- ZIP code: 92021
- Area code: 619
- FIPS code: 06-17106
- GNIS feature ID: 1853383

Crest is an unincorporated community and census-designated place (CDP) in the East County region of San Diego County, California. The community developed during the 1920s as a cabin subdivision known as Suncrest and was heavily affected by the Laguna Fire of 1970 and the Cedar Fire of 2003. The CDP had a population of 2,828 at the 2020 census, up from 2,593 at the 2010 census.

== History ==
Crest developed during the 1920s as a planned cabin subdivision known as Suncrest. Before World War II, the San Diego Sun promoted small lots in the area for use as summer cabins, and some purchasers subsequently became permanent residents. The community historically consisted of two distinct areas, Suncrest and La Cresta, which were eventually united under the name Crest. Crest has been heavily affected by two major wildfires. The Laguna Fire of 1970 destroyed 117 homes in the community. Thirty-three years later, the Cedar Fire of 2003 destroyed 290 homes in Crest.

== Geography ==
Crest is located on a hill east of El Cajon. The CDP has a total area of 6.5 square miles (17 km^{2}), all land.

== Demographics ==
Historical population
| Census | Pop. | Note | %± |
|---|---|---|---|
| 2000 | 2,716 | | — |
| 2010 | 2,593 | | −4.5% |
| 2020 | 2,828 | | 9.1% |
U.S. Decennial Census; 1860–1870 1880-1890; 1900 1910 1920; 1930 1940 1950; 1960 1970 1980; 1990 2000 2010; 2020

Crest first appeared as a census designated place in the 2000 U.S. census.

=== Racial and ethnic composition ===
Crest CDP, California – Racial and ethnic composition Note: the US Census treats Hispanic/Latino as an ethnic category. This table excludes Latinos from the racial categories and assigns them to a separate category. Hispanics/Latinos may be of any race.
| Race / Ethnicity (NH = Non-Hispanic) | Pop 2000 | Pop 2010 | Pop 2020 | % 2000 | % 2010 | % 2020 |
|---|---|---|---|---|---|---|
| White alone (NH) | 2,379 | 2,127 | 1,998 | 87.59% | 82.03% | 70.65% |
| Black or African American alone (NH) | 8 | 22 | 13 | 0.29% | 0.85% | 0.46% |
| Native American or Alaska Native alone (NH) | 12 | 20 | 18 | 0.44% | 0.77% | 0.64% |
| Asian alone (NH) | 19 | 38 | 55 | 0.70% | 1.47% | 1.94% |
| Native Hawaiian or Pacific Islander alone (NH) | 7 | 6 | 6 | 0.26% | 0.23% | 0.21% |
| Other race alone (NH) | 6 | 1 | 6 | 0.22% | 0.04% | 0.21% |
| Mixed race or Multiracial (NH) | 72 | 60 | 150 | 2.65% | 2.31% | 5.30% |
| Hispanic or Latino (any race) | 213 | 319 | 582 | 7.84% | 12.30% | 20.58% |
| Total | 2,716 | 2,593 | 2,828 | 100.00% | 100.00% | 100.00% |

=== 2020 census ===
As of the 2020 census, Crest had a population of 2,828 and a population density of 433.1 inhabitants per square mile (167.2/km^{2}).

The whole population lived in households. There were 995 households, out of which 33.1% included children under the age of 18, 61.9% were married-couple households, 5.8% were cohabiting couple households, 16.3% had a female householder with no partner present, and 16.0% had a male householder with no partner present. 16.5% of households were one person, and 6.8% were one person aged 65 or older. The average household size was 2.84. There were 766 families (77.0% of all households).

The age distribution was 21.1% under the age of 18, 6.6% aged 18 to 24, 25.8% aged 25 to 44, 27.4% aged 45 to 64, and 19.0% who were 65 years of age or older. The median age was 41.9 years. For every 100 females, there were 102.9 males, and for every 100 females age 18 and over there were 101.1 males.

There were 1,032 housing units at an average density of 158.0 units per square mile (61.0 units/km^{2}), of which 995 (96.4%) were occupied. Of these, 85.0% were owner-occupied, and 15.0% were occupied by renters. 3.6% of housing units were vacant. The homeowner vacancy rate was 0.7%; the rental vacancy rate was 6.8%.

83.8% of residents lived in urban areas, while 16.2% lived in rural areas.

=== Income and poverty ===
In 2023, the US Census Bureau estimated that the median household income was $100,052, and the per capita income was $40,546. About 3.4% of families and 5.1% of the population were below the poverty line.

=== 2010 census ===
At the 2010 census, Crest had a population of 2,593. The population density was 397.0 inhabitants per square mile (153.3/km^{2}). The racial makeup of Crest was 2,329 (89.8%) White, 23 (0.9%) African American, 21 (0.8%) Native American, 38 (1.5%) Asian, 7 (0.3%) Pacific Islander, 90 (3.5%) from other races, and 85 (3.3%) from two or more races. Hispanic or Latino of any race were 319 people (12.3%).

The whole population lived in households, no one lived in non-institutionalized group quarters and no one was institutionalized.

There were 962 households, 291 (30.2%) had children under the age of 18 living in them, 576 (59.9%) were opposite-sex married couples living together, 93 (9.7%) had a female householder with no husband present, 51 (5.3%) had a male householder with no wife present. There were 39 (4.1%) unmarried opposite-sex partnerships, and 7 (0.7%) same-sex married couples or partnerships. 179 households (18.6%) were one person and 61 (6.3%) had someone living alone who was 65 or older. The average household size was 2.70. There were 720 families (74.8% of households); the average family size was 3.04.

The age distribution was 496 people (19.1%) under the age of 18, 257 people (9.9%) aged 18 to 24, 551 people (21.2%) aged 25 to 44, 964 people (37.2%) aged 45 to 64, and 325 people (12.5%) who were 65 or older. The median age was 44.8 years. For every 100 females, there were 105.0 males. For every 100 females age 18 and over, there were 101.6 males.

There were 997 housing units at an average density of 152.7 per square mile, of the occupied units 808 (84.0%) were owner-occupied and 154 (16.0%) were rented. The homeowner vacancy rate was 1.0%; the rental vacancy rate was 4.9%. 2,181 people (84.1% of the population) lived in owner-occupied housing units and 412 people (15.9%) lived in rental housing units.

== Community ==
Crest includes several churches, a branch of the San Diego County Library, and Crest School, an elementary school in the Cajon Valley Union School District.

Crest has a longstanding Fourth of July parade tradition. The first recorded Crest Fourth of July parade was held in 1946, when approximately 15 participants walked, rode decorated bicycles or horses, or drove automobiles through the community. The parade subsequently became an annual community celebration, traditionally traveling from South Lane County Park to Nancy Jane County Park.

== Parks and open space ==
South Lane County Park is a 10.45-acre (4.23 ha) undeveloped county park in Crest. The park contains a hiking trail through an area of grassland and rocky hills.

== Notable people ==
- Jimmie Johnson, professional auto racing driver and seven-time NASCAR Cup Series champion, grew up in Crest and attended Crest Elementary School.

== Government ==
As an unincorporated community, Crest is governed locally by the County of San Diego. It is in the second district of the San Diego County Board of Supervisors, represented by Joel Anderson. Crest is also part of the Crest–Dehesa–Granite Hills–Harbison Canyon Community Planning Group, which advises county officials on planning and land-use matters affecting the area.

In the California State Legislature, Crest is in the 39th Senate District, represented by Democrat Akilah Weber Pierson, and in the 75th Assembly District, represented by Republican Carl DeMaio.

In the United States House of Representatives, Crest is in California's 48th congressional district, represented by Republican Darrell Issa.
