= Granite Hills, California =

Granite Hills
- census-designated place
- Location in San Diego County and the state of California

- Location in the United States
- Coordinates: 32°48′15″N 116°54′38″W
- Country: United States
- State: California
- County: San Diego

Area
  - Total: 2.793 sq mi (7.234 km^{2})
  - Land: 2.793 sq mi (7.234 km^{2})
  - Water: 0 sq mi (0 km^{2}) 0%
- Elevation: 659 ft (201 m)

Population (2020)
  - Total: 3,267
  - Density: 1,170/sq mi (451.6/km^{2})
- Time zone: UTC-8 (PST)
  - Summer (DST): UTC-7 (PDT)
- ZIP code: 92021
- Area code: 619
- FIPS code: 06-30703
- GNIS feature ID: 1867026

Granite Hills is a census-designated place in San Diego County, California. The name is also applied to a neighborhood within the city limits of El Cajon in the eastern part of that city. The population of the CDP, which does not include the people living within the city of El Cajon, was 3,267 at the 2020 census, down from 3,035 at the 2010 census.

== Geography ==
According to the USGS, Granite Hills is located at 32°48′11″N 116°54′17″W (32.8031070, -116.9047476), which is near intersection of Madison Avenue and Greenfield Drive. The part of Granite Hills within the city of El Cajon consists of a "gerrymandered" corridor, approximately 0.25 miles (0.40 km) wide on the south side of Madison Avenue, roughly through the center of the neighborhood. The rest of the neighborhood is on unincorporated land. According to the United States Census Bureau, the Granite Hills CDP is located at 32°48′15″N 116°54′38″W (32.804101, -116.910522). This is approximately 0.4 miles (0.64 km) west-northwest of where the USGS places Granite Hills. The CDP comprises most of unincorporated El Cajon east of the San Bernardino Meridian, north of Dehesa Road and has a total area of 2.8 square miles (7.3 km^{2}), all land. Mail sent to all parts of Granite Hills is addressed to El Cajon, California.

== Demographics ==
Historical population
Census	Pop.	Note	%±
1990	3,197		—
2000	3,246		1.5%
2010	3,035		−6.5%
2020	3,267		7.6%
U.S. Decennial Census; 1860–1870 1880-1890; 1900 1910 1920; 1930 1940 1950; 1960 1970 1980; 1990 2000 2010; 2020

Granite Hills was first listed as a census designated place in the 1980 U.S. census.

=== Racial and ethnic composition ===
Granite Hills CDP, California – Racial and ethnic composition Note: the US Census treats Hispanic/Latino as an ethnic category. This table excludes Latinos from the racial categories and assigns them to a separate category. Hispanics/Latinos may be of any race.
Race / Ethnicity (NH = Non-Hispanic)	Pop 2000	Pop 2010	Pop 2020	% 2000	% 2010	% 2020
White alone (NH)	2,859	2,430	2,309	88.08%	80.07%	70.68%
Black or African American alone (NH)	47	41	36	1.45%	1.35%	1.10%
Native American or Alaska Native alone (NH)	20	24	8	0.62%	0.79%	0.24%
Asian alone (NH)	30	41	82	0.92%	1.35%	2.51%
Native Hawaiian or Pacific Islander alone (NH)	4	7	13	0.12%	0.23%	0.40%
Other race alone (NH)	2	4	16	0.06%	0.13%	0.49%
Mixed race or Multiracial (NH)	48	87	170	1.48%	2.87%	5.20%
Hispanic or Latino (any race)	236	401	633	7.27%	13.21%	19.38%
Total	3,246	3,035	3,267	100.00%	100.00%	100.00%

=== 2020 census ===
As of the 2020 census, Granite Hills had a population of 3,267. The population density was 1,169.7 inhabitants per square mile (451.6/km^{2}). For every 100 females, there were 103.6 males, and for every 100 females age 18 and over, there were 99.5 males.

The census reported that 99.1% of the population lived in households, 30 people (0.9%) lived in non-institutionalized group quarters, and no one was institutionalized. The census also reported that 100.0% of residents lived in urban areas and 0.0% lived in rural areas.

There were 1,025 households, out of which 29.8% included children under the age of 18, 66.0% were married-couple households, 3.8% were cohabiting couple households, 17.5% had a female householder with no partner present, and 12.7% had a male householder with no partner present. 12.2% of households were one person, and 6.7% were one person aged 65 or older. The average household size was 3.16. There were 843 families (82.2% of all households).

The age distribution was 19.6% under the age of 18, 7.6% aged 18 to 24, 20.9% aged 25 to 44, 30.4% aged 45 to 64, and 21.5% who were 65 years of age or older. The median age was 46.6 years.

There were 1,078 housing units at an average density of 386.0 units per square mile (149.0 units/km^{2}), of which 1,025 (95.1%) were occupied. Of these, 89.0% were owner-occupied, and 11.0% were occupied by renters. The homeowner vacancy rate was 1.5%, and the rental vacancy rate was 7.9%.

=== Income and poverty ===
In 2023, the US Census Bureau estimated that the median household income in 2023 was $149,938, and the per capita income was $47,322. About 9.0% of families and 10.7% of the population were below the poverty line.

=== 2010 census ===
The 2010 United States census reported that Granite Hills had a population of 3,035. The population density was 1,065.4 inhabitants per square mile (411.4/km^{2}). The racial makeup of Granite Hills was 2,617 (86.2%) White, 43 (1.4%) African American, 26 (0.9%) Native American, 45 (1.5%) Asian, 9 (0.3%) Pacific Islander, 158 (5.2%) from other races, and 137 (4.5%) from two or more races. Hispanic or Latino of any race were 401 persons (13.2%).

The Census reported that 3,023 people (99.6% of the population) lived in households, 12 (0.4%) lived in non-institutionalized group quarters, and 0 (0%) were institutionalized.

There were 1,032 households, out of which 309 (29.9%) had children under the age of 18 living in them, 674 (65.3%) were opposite-sex married couples living together, 90 (8.7%) had a female householder with no husband present, 62 (6.0%) had a male householder with no wife present. There were 41 (4.0%) unmarried opposite-sex partnerships, and 4 (0.4%) same-sex married couples or partnerships. 150 households (14.5%) were made up of individuals, and 82 (7.9%) had someone living alone who was 65 years of age or older. The average household size was 2.93. There were 826 families (80.0% of all households); the average family size was 3.19.

The population was spread out, with 538 people (17.7%) under the age of 18, 311 people (10.2%) aged 18 to 24, 578 people (19.0%) aged 25 to 44, 1,042 people (34.3%) aged 45 to 64, and 566 people (18.6%) who were 65 years of age or older. The median age was 47.0 years. For every 100 females, there were 102.1 males. For every 100 females age 18 and over, there were 100.9 males.

There were 1,090 housing units at an average density of 382.6 per square mile (147.7/km^{2}), of which 914 (88.6%) were owner-occupied, and 118 (11.4%) were occupied by renters. The homeowner vacancy rate was 1.8%; the rental vacancy rate was 4.0%. 2,688 people (88.6% of the population) lived in owner-occupied housing units and 335 people (11.0%) lived in rental housing units.

=== 2000 census ===
As of the census of 2000, there were 3,246 people, 1,043 households, and 895 families residing in the CDP. The population density was 1,118.1 inhabitants per square mile (431.7/km^{2}). There were 1,058 housing units at an average density of 364.4 per square mile (140.7/km^{2}). The racial makeup of the CDP was 91.59% White, 1.45% African American, 0.68% Native American, 0.99% Asian, 0.12% Pacific Islander, 2.99% from other races, and 2.19% from two or more races. Hispanic or Latino of any race were 7.27% of the population.

There were 1,043 households, out of which 32.5% had children under the age of 18 living with them, 75.0% were married couples living together, 6.8% had a female householder with no husband present, and 14.1% were non-families. 11.1% of all households were made up of individuals, and 4.9% had someone living alone who was 65 years of age or older. The average household size was 3.07 and the average family size was 3.22.

In the CDP, the population was spread out, with 24.2% under the age of 18, 8.4% from 18 to 24, 23.7% from 25 to 44, 29.1% from 45 to 64, and 14.5% who were 65 years of age or older. The median age was 42 years. For every 100 females, there were 102.1 males. For every 100 females age 18 and over, there were 102.7 males.

The median income for a household in the CDP was $73,269, and the median income for a family was $75,359. Males had a median income of $46,463 versus $35,521 for females. The per capita income for the CDP was $29,153. None of the families and 2.2% of the population were living below the poverty line, including no under eighteens and 2.0% of those over 64.

== Annexation attempt ==
In 2006, El Cajon attempted to annex a small portion of unincorporated land that is part of the Granite Hills CDP (census block 3006) to allow The Home Depot to build a store there. Protests from the residents of the El Cajon neighborhood surrounding the unincorporated land fell on deaf ears and the annexation was approved by the city council, only to be rejected by the San Diego Local Agency Formation Commission.

== Government ==
In the California State Legislature, Granite Hills is in the 39th senatorial district, represented by Democrat Akilah Weber Pierson, and in the 75th Assembly district, represented by Republican Carl DeMaio.

In the United States House of Representatives, Granite Hills is in California's 48th congressional district, represented by Republican Darrell Issa.
