= Harbison Canyon, California =

Harbison Canyon
- census-designated place
- Location in San Diego County and the state of California

- Location in the United States
- Coordinates: 32°49′16″N 116°50′24″W
- Country: United States
- State: California
- County: San Diego

Area
  - Total: 10.071 sq mi (26.085 km^{2})
  - Land: 10.071 sq mi (26.085 km^{2})
  - Water: 0 sq mi (0 km^{2}) 0%
- Elevation: 906 ft (276 m)

Population (2020)
  - Total: 4,048
  - Density: 401.9/sq mi (155.2/km^{2})
- Time zone: UTC-8 (PST)
  - Summer (DST): UTC-7 (PDT)
- ZIP code: 92019
- Area code: 619
- FIPS code: 06-32044
- GNIS feature IDs: 1660717, 2408350

Harbison Canyon is a census-designated place (CDP) in San Diego County, California. It had a population of 4,048 as of the 2020 census, up from 3,841 as of the 2010 census.

== Geography ==
According to the United States Geological Survey (USGS) Harbison Canyon is located at 32°49′13″N 116°49′48″W (32.8203296, -116.8300236), which is near the intersection of Harbison Canyon Road and Frances Drive. This is where most maps place the community. It is located in a canyon between Crest and Alpine. Mail sent to Harbison Canyon is addressed to El Cajon.

According to the United States Census Bureau Harbison Canyon is located at 32°49′16″N 116°50′24″W (32.821101, -116.840051). This is approximately 3,100 feet west of the USGS location in undeveloped hills west of the community.

According to the United States Census Bureau, the Harbison Canyon census-designated place (CDP) has a total area of 10.1 square miles (26 km^{2}), all land.

== Demographics ==
Historical population
Census	Pop.	Note	%±
1990	2,122		—
2000	3,645		71.8%
2010	3,841		5.4%
2020	4,048		5.4%
U.S. Decennial Census; 1860–1870 1880-1890; 1900 1910 1920; 1930 1940 1950; 1960 1970 1980; 1990 2000 2010; 2020

Harbison Canyon first appeared as a census designated place in the 1990 U.S. census.

=== Racial and ethnic composition ===
Harbison Canyon CDP, California – Racial and ethnic composition Note: the US Census treats Hispanic/Latino as an ethnic category. This table excludes Latinos from the racial categories and assigns them to a separate category. Hispanics/Latinos may be of any race.
Race / Ethnicity (NH = Non-Hispanic)	Pop 2000	Pop 2010	Pop 2020	% 2000	% 2010	% 2020
White alone (NH)	3,057	3,008	2,838	83.87%	78.31%	70.11%
Black or African American alone (NH)	14	11	35	0.38%	0.29%	0.86%
Native American or Alaska Native alone (NH)	54	51	40	1.48%	1.33%	0.99%
Asian alone (NH)	37	64	68	1.02%	1.67%	1.68%
Native Hawaiian or Pacific Islander alone (NH)	2	4	4	0.05%	0.10%	0.10%
Other race alone (NH)	2	1	13	0.05%	0.03%	0.32%
Mixed race or Multiracial (NH)	89	79	221	2.44%	2.06%	5.46%
Hispanic or Latino (any race)	390	623	829	10.70%	16.22%	20.48%
Total	3,645	3,841	4,048	100.00%	100.00%	100.00%

=== 2020 census ===
As of the 2020 census, Harbison Canyon had a population of 4,048 and a population density of 401.9 inhabitants per square mile (155.2/km^{2}).

The racial makeup of Harbison Canyon was 74.8% White, 0.9% African American, 1.8% Native American, 1.8% Asian, 0.2% Pacific Islander, 6.8% from other races, and 13.7% from two or more races. Hispanic or Latino people of any race were 20.5% of the population.

The whole population lived in households. There were 1,447 households, out of which 30.1% included children under the age of 18, 59.3% were married-couple households, 6.8% were cohabiting couple households, 18.0% had a female householder with no partner present, and 15.9% had a male householder with no partner present. 16.7% of households were one person, and 9.3% were one person aged 65 or older. The average household size was 2.8. There were 1,113 families (76.9% of all households).

The age distribution was 21.4% under the age of 18, 7.0% aged 18 to 24, 20.9% aged 25 to 44, 31.9% aged 45 to 64, and 18.8% who were 65 years of age or older. The median age was 45.5 years. For every 100 females, there were 101.5 males, and for every 100 females age 18 and over, there were 103.7 males.

There were 1,497 housing units at an average density of 148.6 units per square mile (57.4 units/km^{2}), of which 1,447 (96.7%) were occupied. Of these, 88.0% were owner-occupied, and 12.0% were occupied by renters. The homeowner vacancy rate was 0.5% and the rental vacancy rate was 9.4%.

44.9% of residents lived in urban areas, while 55.1% lived in rural areas.

=== Income and poverty ===
In 2023, the US Census Bureau estimated that the median household income was $121,007, and the per capita income was $59,883. About 2.3% of families and 5.0% of the population were below the poverty line.

=== 2010 census ===
At the 2010 census Harbison Canyon had a population of 3,841. The population density was 381.9 inhabitants per square mile (147.5/km^{2}). The racial makeup of Harbison Canyon was 3,404 (88.6%) White, 12 (0.3%) African American, 74 (1.9%) Native American, 71 (1.8%) Asian, 6 (0.2%) Pacific Islander, 145 (3.8%) from other races, and 129 (3.4%) from two or more races. Hispanic or Latino of any race were 623 people (16.2%).

The census reported that 3,838 people (99.9% of the population) lived in households, 3 (0.1%) lived in non-institutionalized group quarters, and no one was institutionalized.

There were 1,343 households, 462 (34.4%) had children under the age of 18 living in them, 804 (59.9%) were opposite-sex married couples living together, 154 (11.5%) had a female householder with no husband present, 76 (5.7%) had a male householder with no wife present. There were 73 (5.4%) unmarried opposite-sex partnerships, and 14 (1.0%) same-sex married couples or partnerships. 221 households (16.5%) were one person and 70 (5.2%) had someone living alone who was 65 or older. The average household size was 2.86. There were 1,034 families (77.0% of households); the average family size was 3.19.

The age distribution was 857 people (22.3%) under the age of 18, 354 people (9.2%) aged 18 to 24, 851 people (22.2%) aged 25 to 44, 1,363 people (35.5%) aged 45 to 64, and 416 people (10.8%) who were 65 or older. The median age was 42.4 years. For every 100 females, there were 103.9 males. For every 100 females age 18 and over, there were 101.5 males.

There were 1,413 housing units at an average density of 140.5 per square mile, of the occupied units 1,160 (86.4%) were owner-occupied and 183 (13.6%) were rented. The homeowner vacancy rate was 2.3%; the rental vacancy rate was 1.6%. 3,277 people (85.3% of the population) lived in owner-occupied housing units and 561 people (14.6%) lived in rental housing units.

== History ==
=== John Stewart Harbison ===
John Stewart Harbison was born the third child of William and Margaret (Curry) Harbison, on a farm near Freedom, Pennsylvania, on September 29, 1826.

John Stewart Harbison

He became a beekeeper in the tradition of his father, and later migrated to the west coast of the United States. After spending some years in other California locations, he eventually arrived in San Diego aboard the ship Orizaba with one hundred and ten colonies of bees on November 28, 1869. In the spring of 1874 he moved with his wife and daughter to a homestead near the Sweetwater River twenty-three miles east of San Diego in a small valley now known as Harbison Canyon. Within seven years time, he was the largest producer of honey in the world, operating two thousand to three thousand hives. At that time, having several hundred hives was considered a large operation.

His success in capitalizing on the vast honey potential of San Diego County, along with his extensive campaign of selling bees to the residents of the county was the major force in making San Diego County the greatest honey-producing county in the State of California by 1874, which in turn made California the leading honey producing state of the Union. John Harbison was a major contributor to the theory of bee culture with his development of new tools and methods that characterized the remarkable advances made in nineteenth century apicultural science. Harbison and his brother William were both important 19th century American authors on bee keeping science. Furthermore, he opened up the great retail markets east of the Mississippi River needed to absorb the tremendous honey crops produced in California. Harbison, known as the "King of the Beekeepers" died on October 12, 1912, in San Diego at the age of eighty-six.

=== Fires ===
Harbison Canyon was twice devastated by wildfires, first by the Laguna Fire in 1970 then again by the Cedar Fire on October 26, 2003, the worst firestorm in California history. The town lost 370 homes out of 420 in the community. Homes were still being rebuilt as recently as 2007. The community was bestowed considerable attention by the news media, which led to a visit within weeks by Governor Gray Davis, Governor-elect Arnold Schwarzenegger, his wife Maria (Kennedy-Schriver) Schwarzenegger and President George W. Bush. The president arrived by helicopter which landed on the grounds of the Shadow Hills Elementary School.

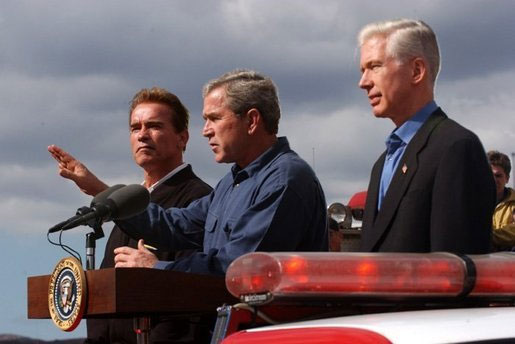
Gov-elect Schwarzenegger, Pres. G.W. Bush and Gov. Davis during visit immediately after Cedar fire.

The community received help in rebuilding from many organizations, most notably from the New York Says Thank You Foundation which was created in response to the tremendous support given to New Yorkers from people all over the United States after the September 11 attacks. Since 2003, the Harbison Canyon Lions Club has participated in numerous post-disaster rebuilding projects around the U.S. sponsored by the NYSTY Foundation.

== Attractions ==
Harbison Canyon, apart from its unfortunate encounters with wildfires, is best known amongst locals for Old Ironsides County Park, a 3.6-acre, shaded grove of trees maintained by the San Diego County Parks and Recreation Department. The park is located at 326 Harbison Canyon Road, El Cajon, CA 92020. Park hours are sunrise to sunset. The park has a playground, basketball court, picnic tables (some covered), restrooms, and a municipal hall for different community and civic groups to meet.

Ancient Kumeyaay relics have occasionally been found near the stream that runs through the park and canyon.

== Government ==
In the California State Legislature, Harbison Canyon is in the 40th senatorial district, represented by Republican Brian Jones, and in the 75th Assembly district, represented by Republican Carl DeMaio.

In the United States House of Representatives, Harbison Canyon is in California's 48th congressional district, represented by Republican Darrell Issa.

Harbison Canyon is served by San Diego County Fire Station 24.
