= Derby Dike =

Historical Landmark in San Diego, California, United States

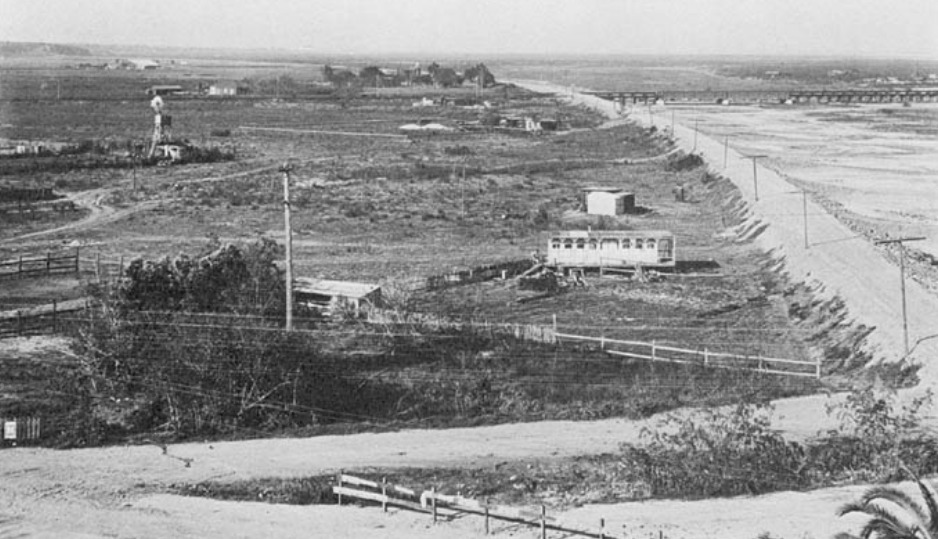
- Derby Dike and the San Diego River in 1905; the dike has power poles on it

- Location within California Location within the United States
- 32.759°N 117.196°W

History
- Built: 1853

Site notes
- Architect: Lieutenant George Derby
- Architectural style: Earthworks

California Historical Landmark
- Designated: June 10, 1936
- Reference no.: 244

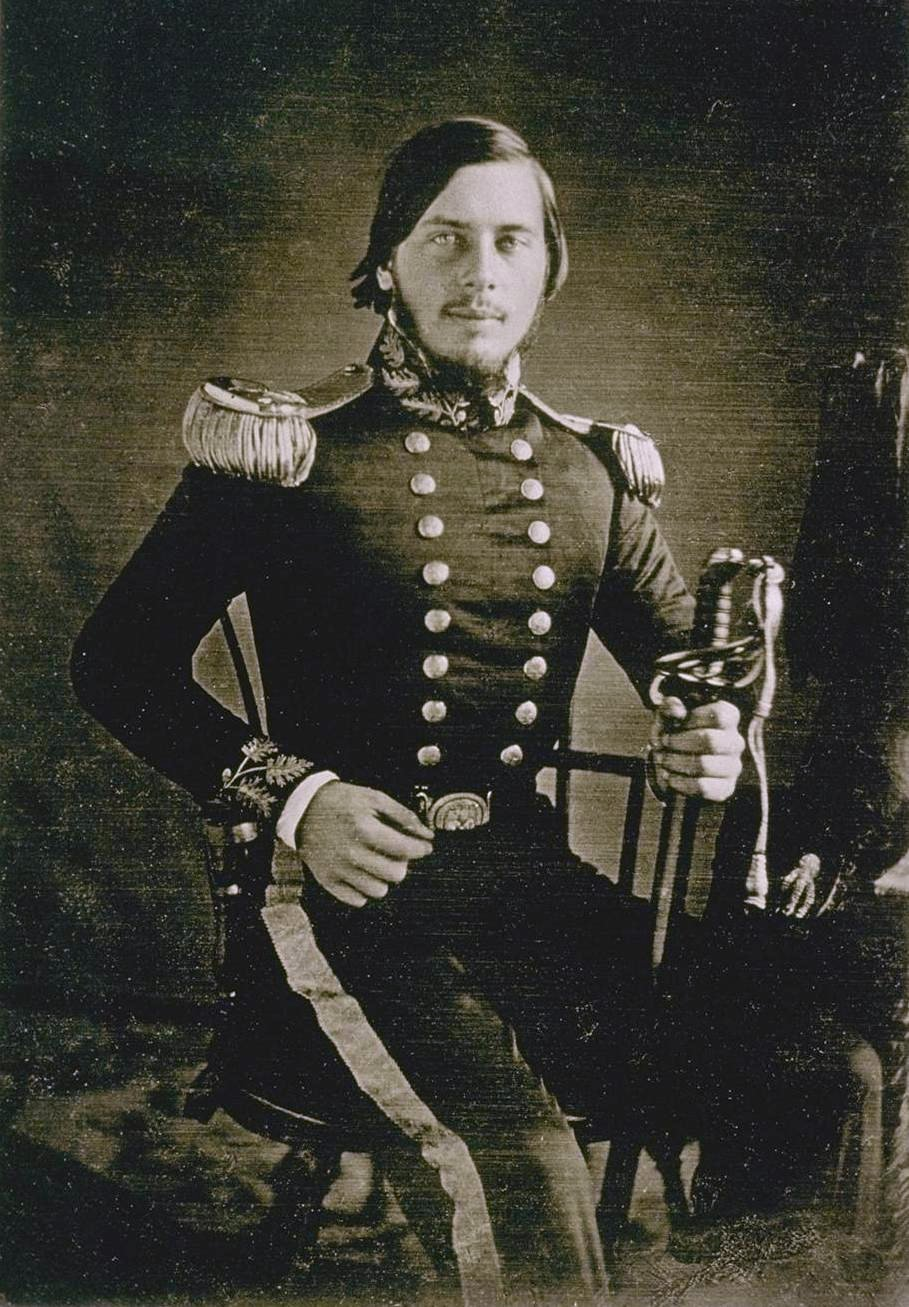
Lieutenant George Horatio Derby

Derby Dike is an earthworks levee embankment built along the San Diego River in San Diego County, California, by Lieutenant George Derby in 1853. Derby Dike is a California Historical Landmark No. 244 listed on June 10, 1936. It runs from Old Town to Point Loma, about 5 miles (8 km). A California historical marker is at Taylor Street and Presidio Drive. It was one of the first major US government projects in California.

Before Derby Dike was built, the San Diego River would often overflow its banks and flood parts of Old Town and surrounding San Diego, including San Diego Bay and its harbor. Lieutenant Derby, with the United States Army Corps of Topographical Engineers, had Derby Dike built so the river would flow into False Bay, now called Mission Bay, rather than into San Diego Bay.

While Derby Dike helped with the flooding and debris flow into the harbor, there were still major floods that overwhelmed it. A major flood in 1853 destroyed parts of Derby Dike, and the San Diego River flowed back into the harbor. By 1875, Derby Dike was repaired and the river was flowing back into False Bay. A major flood in 1884 again destroyed parts of Derby Dike, and it was repaired again.

Derby-Pendleton House was constructed in 1851 by Lieutenant Derby. Sweetwater Dam was built in 1888 to help stop the flooding problem. Six other dams were built on the San Diego River, the last in 1898. The river was not fully contained until the 1950s. The largest dam on the river is El Capitan Dam.

== See also ==
- California Historical Landmarks in San Diego County
- List of dams and reservoirs in California
- Exchange Hotel
- Old Mission Dam
- El Capitan Reservoir
- San Vicente Dam
- Loveland Dam
- Olivenhain Dam
- San Vicente Dam
- Lake Hodges Dam
- Great Flood of 1862
