= San Vicente Dam =

Dam in San Diego County, California

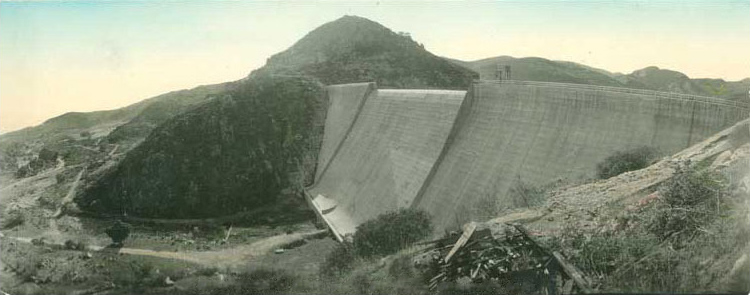
- San Vicente Dam in 1950

- Location within California
- Location: Lakeside, San Diego County, California.
- Coordinates: 32°54′44″N 116°55′28″W
- Status: Operational
- Construction began: 1941; 85 years ago (original); 2009; 17 years ago (raising)
- Opening date: 1943; 83 years ago (original); 2014; 12 years ago (raising)
- Construction cost: US$2.7 million (original); US$396 million (raising)
- Owner: City of San Diego

Dam and spillways
- Type of dam: Concrete gravity
- Impounds: San Vicente Creek
- Height: 220 ft (67 m) (original); 337 ft (103 m) (raised)
- Length: 980 ft (300 m) (original); 1,425 ft (434 m) (raised)
- Spillway type: Ogee, uncontrolled

Reservoir
- Creates: San Vicente Reservoir
- Total capacity: 90,000 acre⋅ft (110,000,000 m^{3}) (original); 249,358 acre⋅ft (307,579,000 m^{3}) (raised)
- Catchment area: 75 mi^{2} (190 km^{2})
- Surface area: 1,100 acres (4.5 km^{2}) (original); 1,600 acres (6.5 km^{2}) (raised)
- Maximum water depth: 306 feet (93 m) (raised)

San Vicente Dam is a concrete gravity dam on San Vicente Creek near Lakeside and 25 km (15.5 mi) northeast of San Diego, California. The dam was built between 1941 and 1943 and created San Vicente Reservoir for the purpose of municipal water storage, flood control and recreation. Although the reservoir is fed by run-off, its main source is the First San Diego Aqueduct. In June 2009, construction to raise the height of the dam by 117 ft (36 m), in order to more than double its reservoir size, commenced. It is the largest dam raise in the United States and largest roller-compacted concrete dam raise in the world. The dam raise project was originally set for the end of 2012, but was completed in early 2014. Efforts to replace the water supply pipelines and prepare the reservoir for the public will be underway until 2015–2017.

== History ==
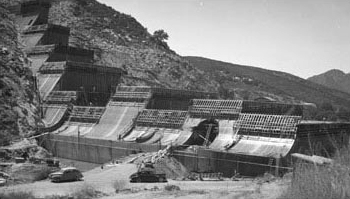
San Vicente Dam under construction in 1942

In the late 19th century, San Diego began constructing dams to help supply municipal water, mitigate drought and control floods in the San Diego River Basin. In 1928, the Metropolitan Water District of Southern California was created and charged with transferring water from the Colorado River to southern California but San Diego was excluded from the project. Construction of the Colorado River Aqueduct had begun in 1933 and was completed in 1941. However, construction on San Vicente Dam began in 1941 with anticipation of San Diego receiving water through the Colorado River Aqueduct. San Diego residents had initially rejected proposals to build San Vicente Dam in 1939 but after the realization of the city's growing population, voters quickly approved funding for San Vicente Dam in 1940.

Construction on the dam included pouring concrete into blocks measuring 5 by 50 feet (1.5 by 15.2 m) and incorporating a 275 ft (84 m) wide uncontrolled ogee-type spillway on the dam's downstream face. The outlet works, which release water for municipal use, connected the reservoir intake on the upstream side of the crest with San Vicente Pipelines 1 and 2 via three cast-iron pipes 36 inches (910 mm) in diameter. In 1944, the San Diego County Water Authority (SDCWA) was formed and would soon begin construction on an aqueduct from the Colorado River Aqueduct called the San Diego Aqueduct to supply projected future water needs. Construction on San Vicente Dam was completed in 1943 but construction on the First San Diego Aqueduct, which was supplied by the Colorado River Aqueduct, did not begin until 1945. It was not until 1947 that the First Aqueduct was complete and San Vicente Reservoir began to receive its water.

=== Dam raising ===
As part of the SDCWA's $1 billion Emergency Storage Project which began in 2000, the San Vicente Dam Raise increased the height of the 220 ft (67 m) dam by 117 ft (36 m) to 337 ft (103 m). This in turn will more than double the reservoir's original capacity of 90,000 acre⋅ft (110,000,000 m^{3}) by increasing it 152,000 acre⋅ft (187,000,000 m^{3}) to a total of 242,000 acre⋅ft (299,000,000 m^{3}). The original designers had predicted that raising the dam would be necessary in the future and positioned the dam in such a way that its height could be increased by as much as 120 ft along with ensuring its grout curtain was extended for a larger foundation.

In 2006, the SDCWA awarded Montgomery Watson Harza (MWH) with a $20.4 million contract which included developing the raised-dam's design and other engineering services during construction. Construction on the roller-compacted concrete (RCC) dam raise is being managed by Black & Veatch and Parsons and was done in specific stages. The first stage began in June 2009 and consisted of preparing the dam's foundation and was completed in 2010 after which the dam raise began. The construction reached a milestone in October 2012 as the dam reached its final height of 337 feet. The new dam is 117 feet higher than the old one, the tallest dam raise in the United States. The dam raise was completed in early 2014. The reservoir's replacement pipeline will last until 2015. The reservoir, which was closed for recreation when construction began, will reopen between 2014 and 2017 depending on when it reaches normal levels. The San Vicente Dam Raise itself was estimated to cost $568 million and will be complemented with a new pumping facility and the San Vicente Pipeline which will connect San Vicente Reservoir to the Second San Diego Aqueduct. The RCC raised-dam will be the tallest dam raise in the United States along with the tallest of its type in the world.

== See also ==
- List of reservoirs and dams in California
- Lower Otay Reservoir
- Saluda Dam
