= Capitan Grande Reservation =

Indian reservation in California, United States

Coordinates: 32°55′33.54″N 116°43′45.58″W

Location of Capitan Grande Reservation

The Capitan Grande Reservation (Kumiai: Kwillyemak) is a Kumeyaay Indian reservation in San Diego County, California, jointly controlled by the Barona Group of Capitan Grande Band of Mission Indians and the Viejas Group of Capitan Grande Band of Mission Indians. The reservation is uninhabited and is 15,753 acres (63.75 km^{2}) large, located in the Cuyamaca Mountains and middle of Cleveland National Forest and west of Cuyamaca Peak. The closest town is Alpine, California.

== History ==
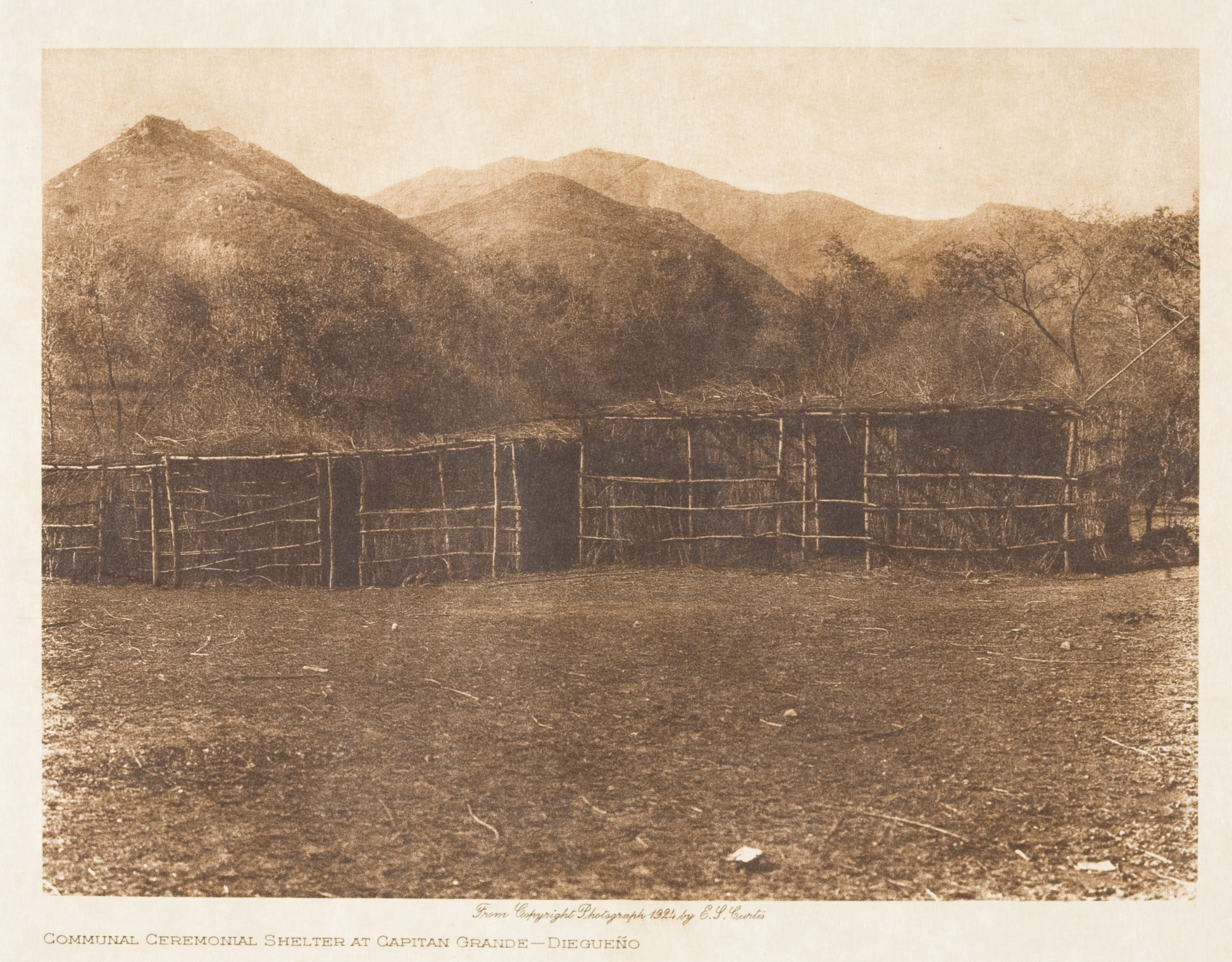
Communal Ceremonial Shelter at Capitan Grande (photographed by Edward Sheriff Curtis in 1924.

The reservation was created by President Ulysses S. Grant, via executive order in 1875 for local Kumeyaay people. Its name comes from the Spanish Coapan, which was what the area west of the San Diego River was called in the 19th century. The dry, mountainous and chaparral lands proved inhospitable.

In 1931, the state flooded the heart of the reservation, creating El Capitan Reservoir. Many Kumeyaay families had homes in the flood zone, and they petitioned Congress to prevent the loss of their land; however, Congress gave San Diego the right to buy the land without the local Kumeyaays' knowledge or consent. The two tribes, Barona and Viejas, were forced to sell the land and with their proceeds they purchased their current reservations, the Barona Reservation and Viejas Reservation, respectively.

In 1973, seven people lived on the reservation.

== Today ==
Today, the two tribes have a joint-trust patent of the remaining reservation. It is undeveloped but serves as an ecological preserve.

== Demographics ==
=== 2020 census ===
Capitan Grande Reservation, California – Racial and ethnic composition Note: the US Census treats Hispanic/Latino as an ethnic category. This table excludes Latinos from the racial categories and assigns them to a separate category. Hispanics/Latinos may be of any race.
Race / Ethnicity (NH = Non-Hispanic)	Pop 2000	Pop 2010	Pop 2020	% 2000	% 2010	% 2020
White alone (NH)	0	0	0	0.00%	0.00%	0.00%
Black or African American alone (NH)	0	0	0	0.00%	0.00%	0.00%
Native American or Alaska Native alone (NH)	0	0	0	0.00%	0.00%	0.00%
Asian alone (NH)	0	0	0	0.00%	0.00%	0.00%
Native Hawaiian or Pacific Islander alone (NH)	0	0	0	0.00%	0.00%	0.00%
Other race alone (NH)	0	0	0	0.00%	0.00%	0.00%
Mixed race or Multiracial (NH)	0	0	0	0.00%	0.00%	0.00%
Hispanic or Latino (any race)	0	0	0	0.00%	0.00%	0.00%
Total	0	0	0	100.00%	100.00%	100.00%

== Bibliography ==
- Pritzker, Barry M. (2000). A Native American Encyclopedia: History, Culture, and Peoples. Oxford University Press. ISBN 978-0-19513-877-1.
- Eargle, Dolan H. Jr. (1992). California Indian Country: The Land & the People. San Francisco: Tree Company Press. ISBN 978-0-93740-120-0.
- Shipek, Florence C. (1978). "History of Southern California Mission Indians". In Heizer, Robert F. (ed.). Handbook of North American Indians. Vol. 8: California. Washington, DC: Smithsonian Institution. pp. 610–618. ISBN 978-0-16004-574-5.
