= El Capitan Dam =

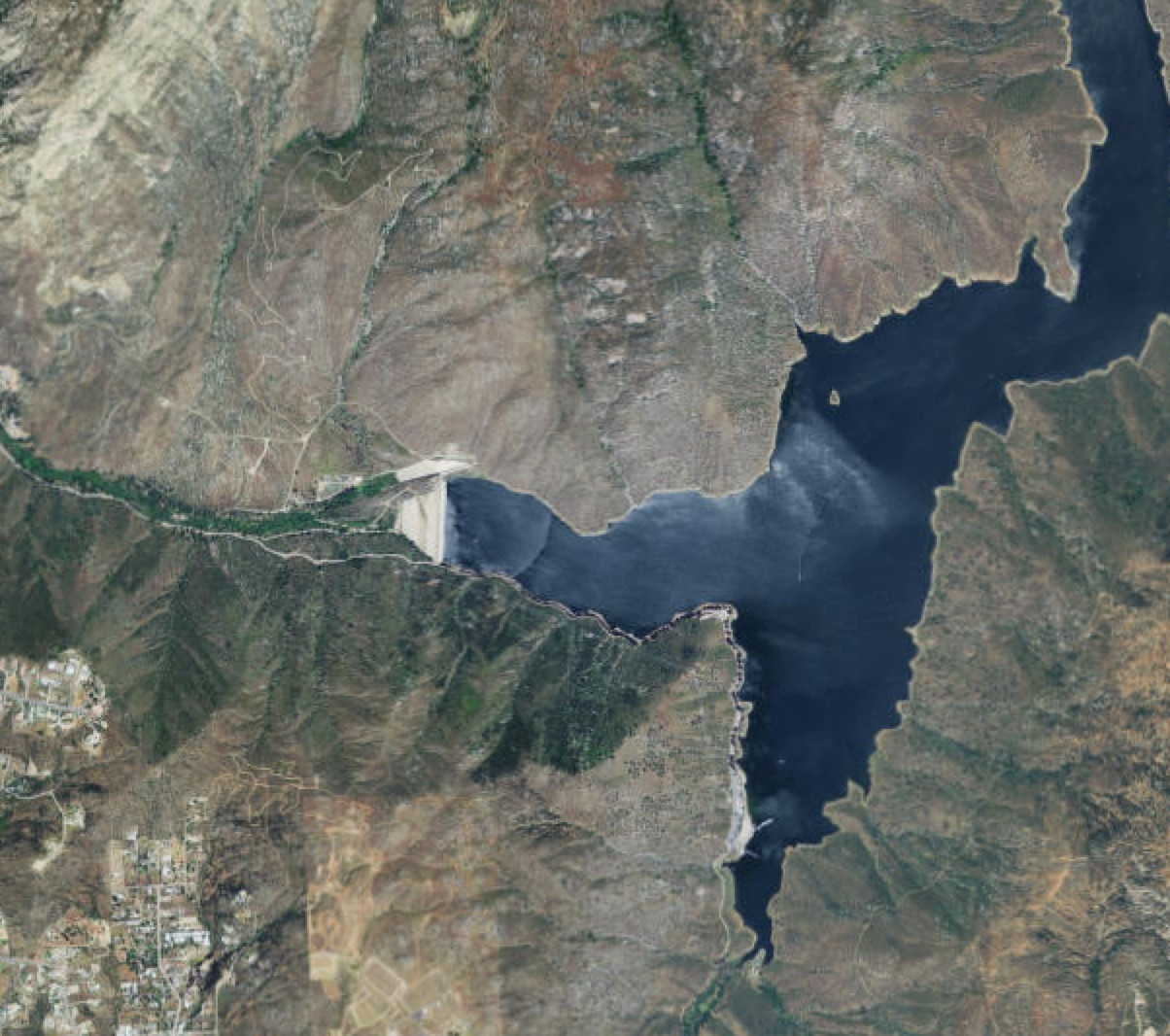
- Satellite view

- Location within California
- Country: United States
- Location: Cleveland National Forest, San Diego County, California
- Coordinates: 32°53′02″N 116°48′34″W
- Construction began: 1931; 95 years ago
- Opening date: 1934; 92 years ago
- Construction cost: $5.8 million
- Owner: City of San Diego

Dam and spillways
- Type of dam: Embankment
- Impounds: San Diego River
- Height: 237 ft (72 m)
- Length: 1,170 ft (360 m)

Reservoir
- Creates: El Capitan Reservoir
- Total capacity: 112,800 acre⋅ft (139,100,000 m^{3})
- Catchment area: 190 mi^{2} (490 km^{2})
- Surface area: 1,536 acres (622 ha)

El Capitan Dam is an embankment dam or hydraulic fill dam on the San Diego River in San Diego County, California, United States. The dam forms the 112,800-acre-foot (139,100,000 m^{3}) El Capitan Reservoir and serves mainly to supply water to the city of San Diego as well as providing flood control. The dam is connected to the San Diego municipal water system via the El Capitan Pipeline, which extends approximately 30 miles (48 km) to the city. It is the second largest storage facility in San Diego's water supply system, after San Vicente Dam.

== History ==
A dam was first proposed for the San Diego River after several years of drought in the early 1900s. The city of San Diego commissioned Engineer Hiram N. Savage to design the structure. Savage proposed the river be impounded at Mission Gorge, in what is now Mission Trails Regional Park. The bedrock canyon had ideal geology for a masonry dam, and the site was only 7 miles (11 km) from the city limits. The reservoir would have flooded a large area of the Mission Valley (now downtown Santee, which was productive agricultural land at the time. Its large surface area would also have been subject to evaporation losses. The City of San Diego favored a dam site at El Capitan, which was located more than 30 miles (48 km) further upstream. The chief benefit of the El Capitan site was that it would create a narrower, deeper reservoir with a more efficient ratio of water storage to evaporation. However, the site had a greater depth to bedrock and would require the construction of a more expensive embankment dam, as well as a longer aqueduct to transport water to the city. Savage refused to consider the El Capitan site and was fired by the city in 1923.

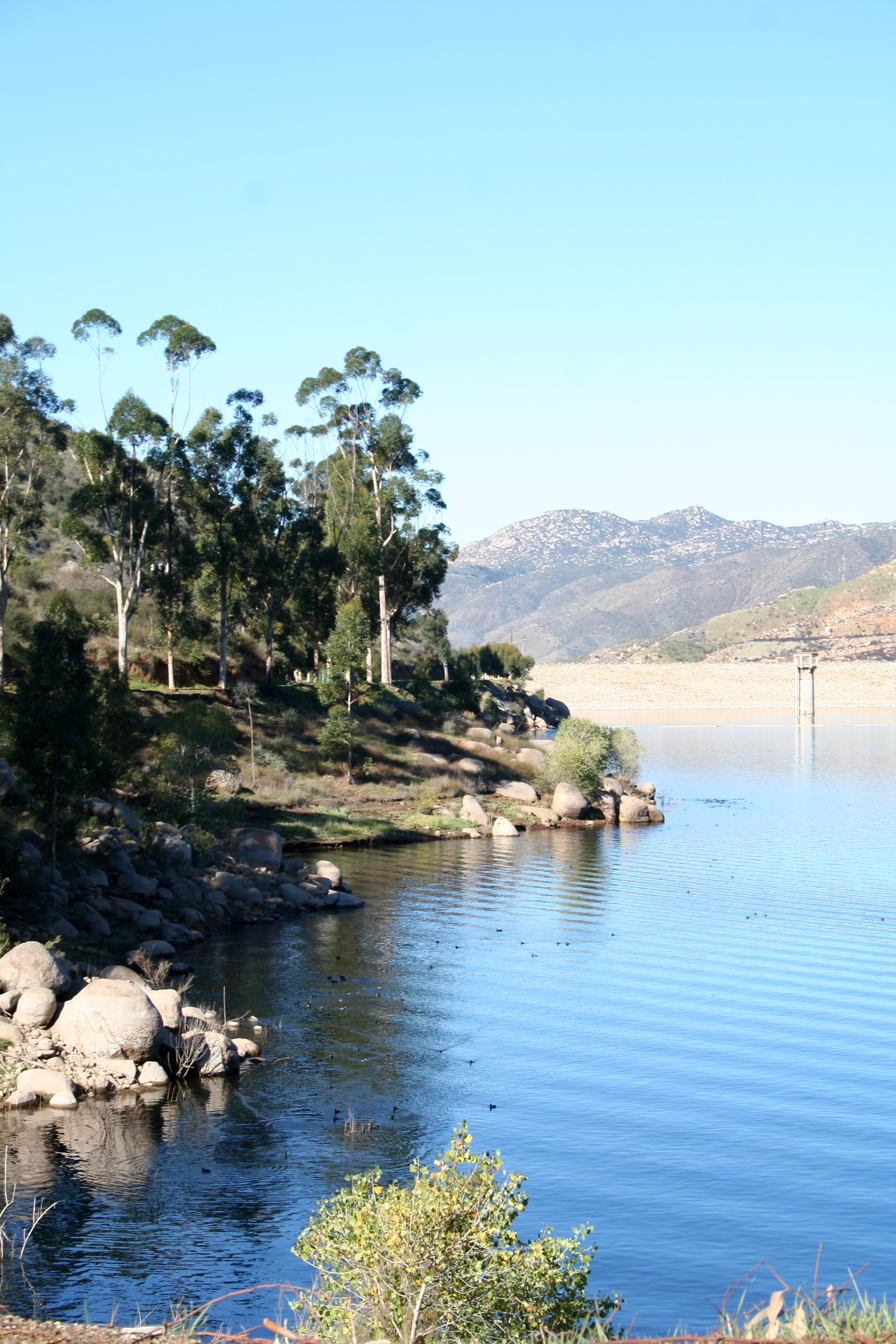
The reservoir, with the back side of dam seen in the distance

Native Americans of the Capitan Grande Reservation, part of which would be flooded by the proposed reservoir, opposed the project. Some of the Indians insisted the city give them title to new lands before allowing them to move grave sites from the reservoir area. In 1919 Congress passed the El Capitan Act, which transferred the Indians' water rights and lands to the city of San Diego, in exchange for resettlement elsewhere and a payment of $361,420 by the city. The initial act covered only the relocation of people and livestock in the reservoir flood zone, but later was extended to much of the watershed of the San Diego River above El Capitan, in order to protect water quality. Local water districts, including the Cuyamaca Flume Company, also fought against the project, fearing that the dam would reduce the amount of San Diego River water available for their use. Litigation dragged on for years, to the point where "cash-strapped San Diego taxpayers had begun to consider other reservoir sites".

Construction on the dam was financed by $4.5 million in revenue bonds issued in 1924, but even with voter approval, the project did not move forward until the 1930s, when San Diego finally won its case for the necessary water rights. The city approached Savage to design the dam, but Savage refused, on the grounds that it was a poor site. In 1931, the decision of whether a dam should be built at El Capitan or Savage's preferred Mission Gorge was held to a public vote. The Mission Gorge site lost by a narrow margin. Savage eventually agreed to design the dam, the first of its kind he had built. Just six months after the dam's completion, Savage died of heart failure. Construction on the dam began in December 1931 using the hydraulic fill method. The embankment was completed in 1934, at a final cost of $5.8 million. It was the second municipal dam to be constructed in the San Diego River basin, after the 1884 Cuyamaca Dam. The El Capitan Pipeline, which connects the reservoir to the city, was completed in the same year. The reservoir did not fill to capacity until 1938, after storms soaked Southern California, causing severe flooding.

Since 2019, four of the city's water supply dams have downgraded from fair to poor condition by California regulators due to deterioration and concerns they could fail due to an earthquake or extraordinary rainfall.

== Description ==
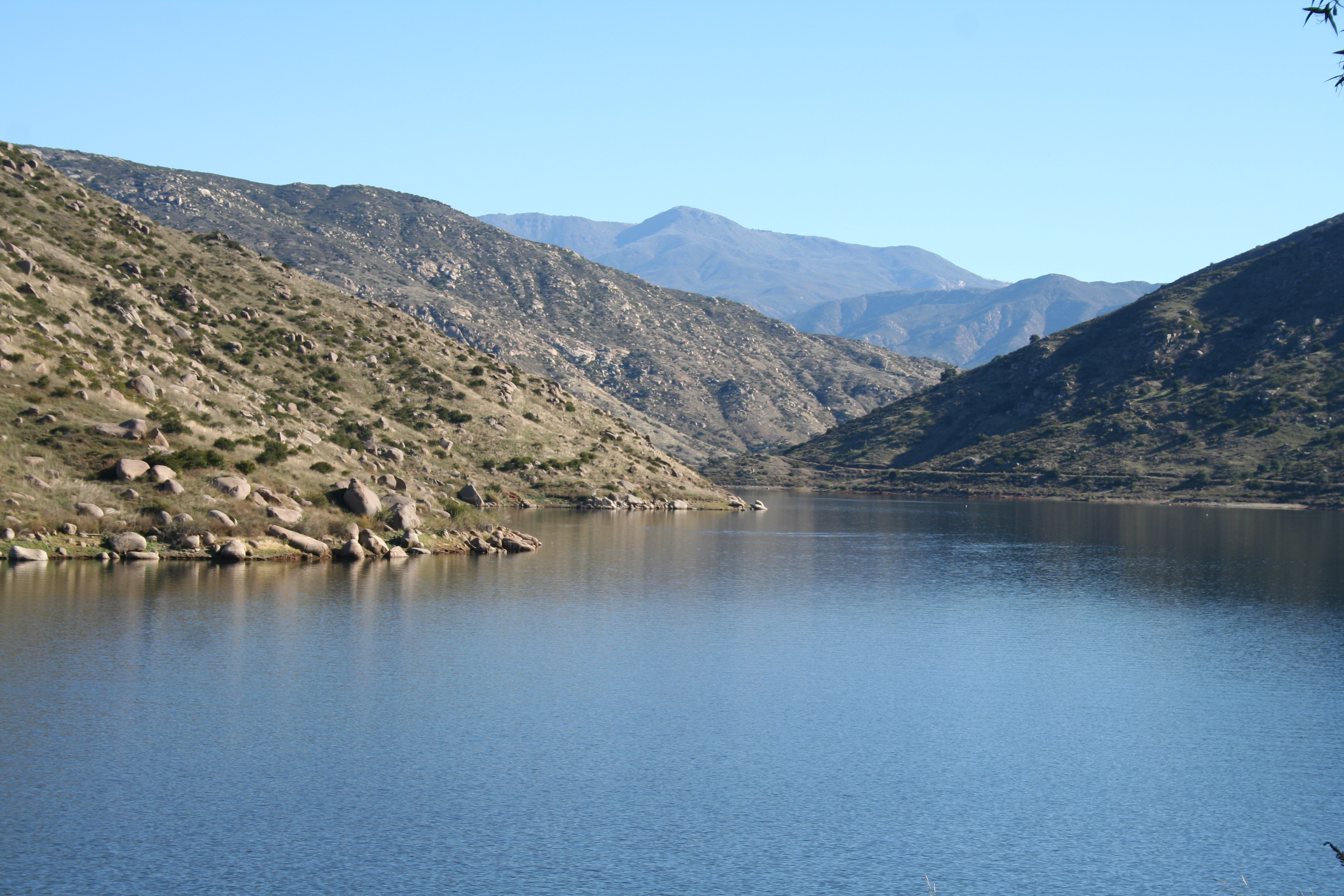
El Capitan Reservoir

El Capitan Dam is a rock-filled embankment dam with an impervious clay core. The dam is situated in a narrow granite gorge, just below the confluence of Conejos Creek with the San Diego River. The dam is 237 feet (72 m) high from the foundations and 219 feet (67 m) high from the riverbed, 1,170 feet (360 m) long at the crest, and 26 feet (7.9 m) wide at the crest. Altogether, the dam contains 2,679,680 cubic yards (2,048,760 m^{3}) of material. The spillway is a concrete overflow channel on the north side of the dam with no gates, and overflows once water levels exceed the conservation pool. The capacity of the spillway is 170,700 cubic feet per second (4,830 m^{3}/s). Normal water releases into the El Capitan Pipeline are made through a control tower with six 30-inch (760 mm) valves, allowing water to be drawn from different elevations in order to compensate for temperature and turbidity changes. The pipeline has a capacity of 61 million gallons (1,727,000 m^{3}) per day, or 94 cubic feet per second (2.7 m^{3}/s).

At full capacity, El Capitan Reservoir is about 8 miles (13 km) long and has a water elevation of 750 feet (230 m). The reservoir surface area is 1,562 acres (632 ha), and the capacity is 112,807 acre-feet (139,145,000 m^{3}). It is the biggest of San Diego's local surface water supply reservoirs (San Vicente Reservoir is larger, but is filled mainly with imported Colorado River water). The average storage levels range from a high of 48,474 acre-feet (59,792,000 m^{3}) in April to a low of 34,461 acre-feet (42,507,000 m^{3}) in November. The average annual rainfall at El Capitan Dam is 15.9 inches (400 mm), ranging from 12 inches (300 mm) in the lowlands to 33 inches (840 mm) in the highest mountains. The average annual inflow into the reservoir is 31,666 acre-feet (39,059,000 m^{3}). Water levels are unpredictable, as severe floods and multi-year droughts are not uncommon to the region. El Capitan rarely fills because its capacity is so large relative to the average runoff from the watershed above it. The water level is intentionally kept low due to the possibility of failure during an earthquake resulting in less water available during a severe drought. The reservoir is allowed to a maximum 2/3 of capacity throughout the winter and early spring to prevent uncontrolled spills. Since the dam is situated so high in the watershed, it has a limited capacity to control localized flooding along the lower San Diego River.

== Hydraulic fill dam construction ==
The draft engineer and inspection engineer for the project was Harry Newcomb. His images of the construction process are used here to describe how this was accomplished. They were found as negatives by his grandson, January 30, 2023. This is his work.

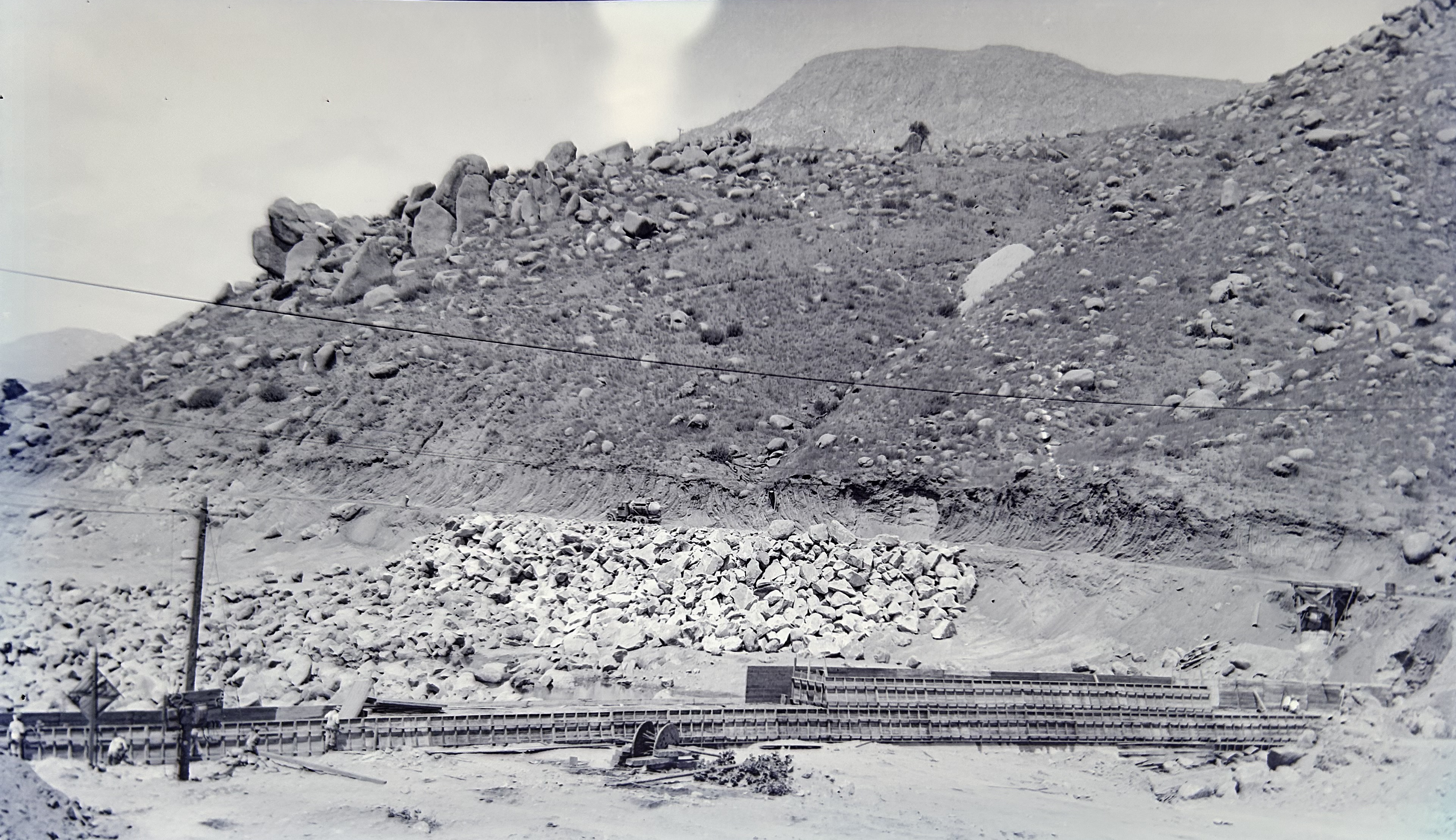

The eastern toe is visible for the levee, and the primary source of material is the mound visible here. After the site is selected, and material sources are identified, the "toes" are created on each side which provide the base for the levee on each side. At El Capitan, the length is oriented north to south, and so the levees, east and west. The materials came from two sites to the north side, the primary being the large bulge of material visible in the image of the Easter toe. The large boulder visible here remains there today just below the platform at the north end. To the right of that in that image is now the spillway. That material was used in the construction of the dam and is visible in two images below as a receding cut in the hillside. Most images below are from the south looking north.

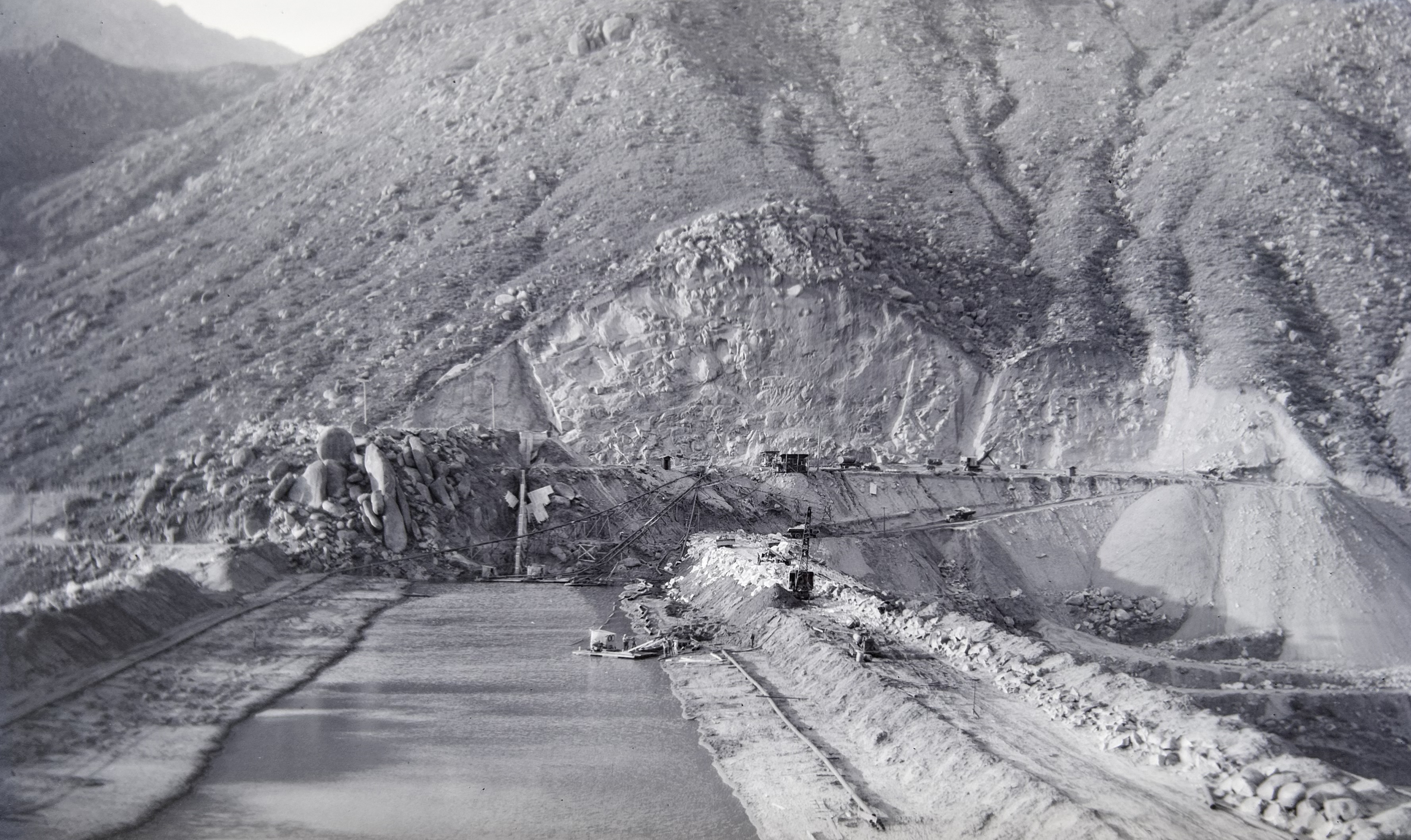

El Capitan Construction by HVN in pond looking North full operations visible Levee dredges pump houses upper settlement pond Beaches and Core Pond. When the levee on each side is formed, materials are sorted and washed. Gravel, riprap, rocks, boulders are used for the levee, the wash material is pumped down to the site and sprayed to the inside base of the levees. The material sorts itself with larger materials settling against the levee and finer sands in the middle area, called a "beech" and the "fines," or muds washing to the center settlement pond.

This is critical because the levees, shoulders, and "beach" are porous and there to support the impervious core. The mud prevents the dam from leakage, erosion, and eventual failure. As the dam rises, the levees form the sloped embankment giving them the name "embankment dam." In this image note the erosion of the mountain and the cut of the road to the left, going one mile along the road still visible today to the second materials source. The dump trucks are building the outer shell, or shoulder, or the outer beach area.

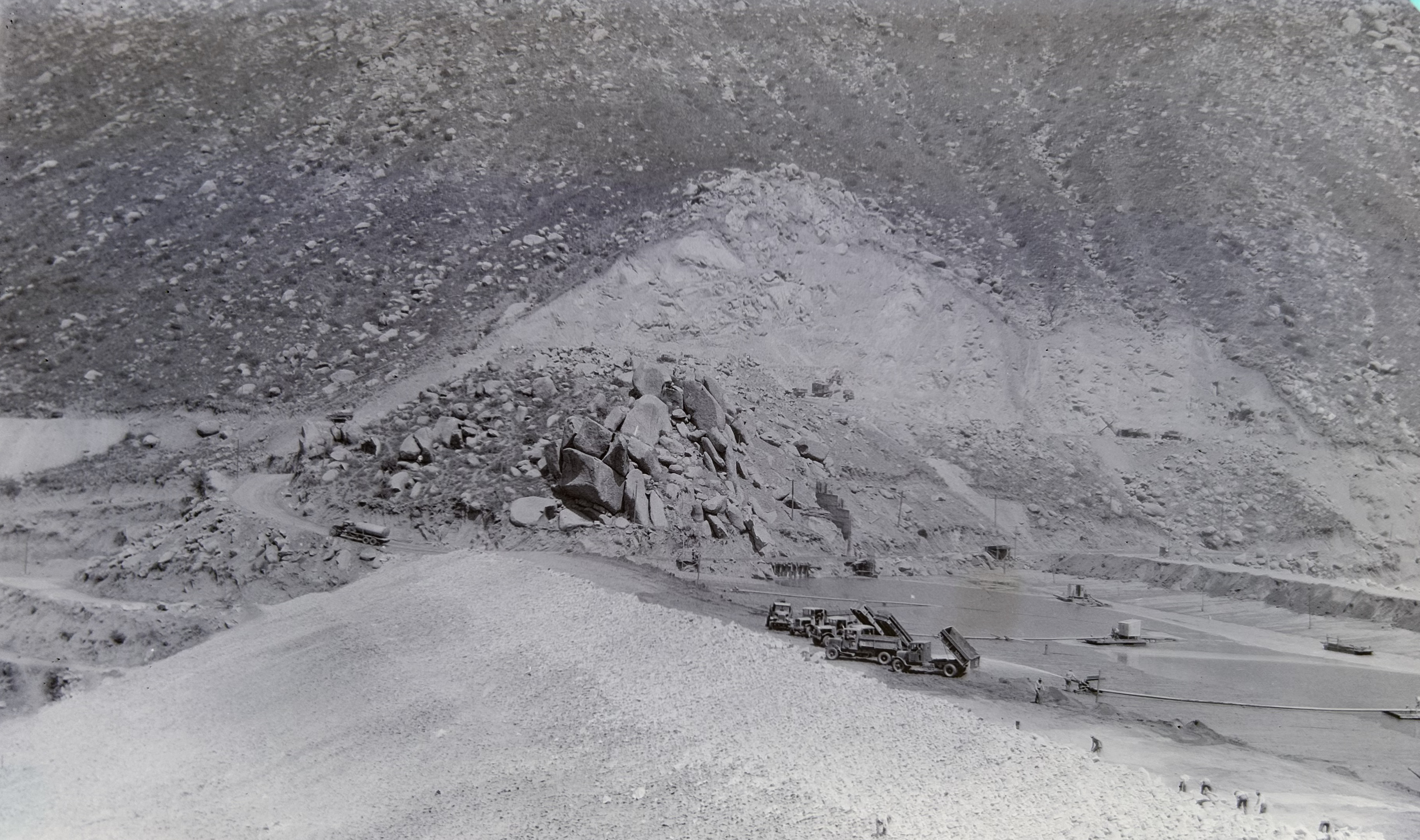

Lastly, the opening ceremony of El Capitan Reservoir, 1934. Note to the left of the crown, the large boulder visible in the first image. This orients the image.

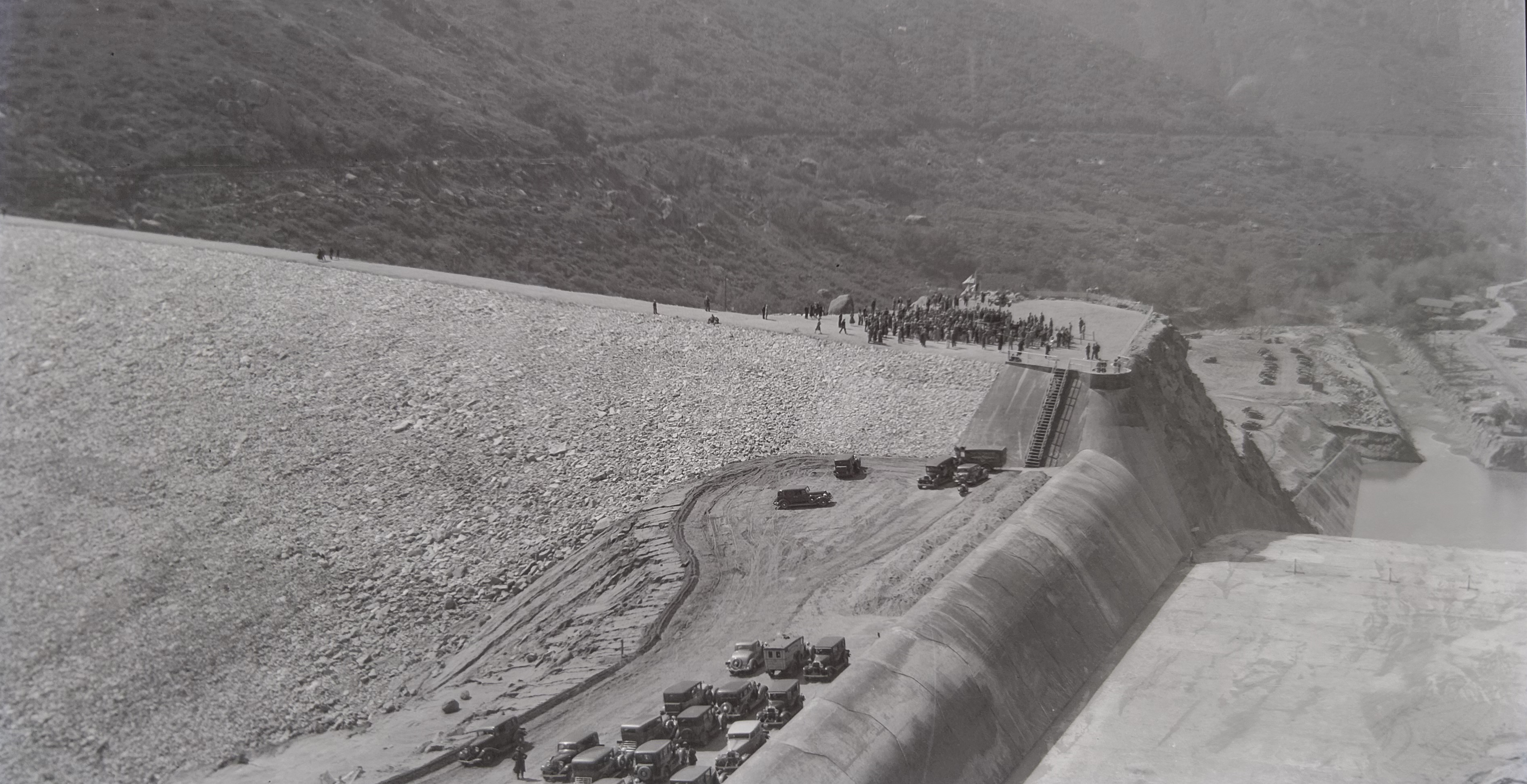

== See also ==
- List of dams and reservoirs in California
