= El Capitan Reservoir =

Reservoir in San Diego County, California

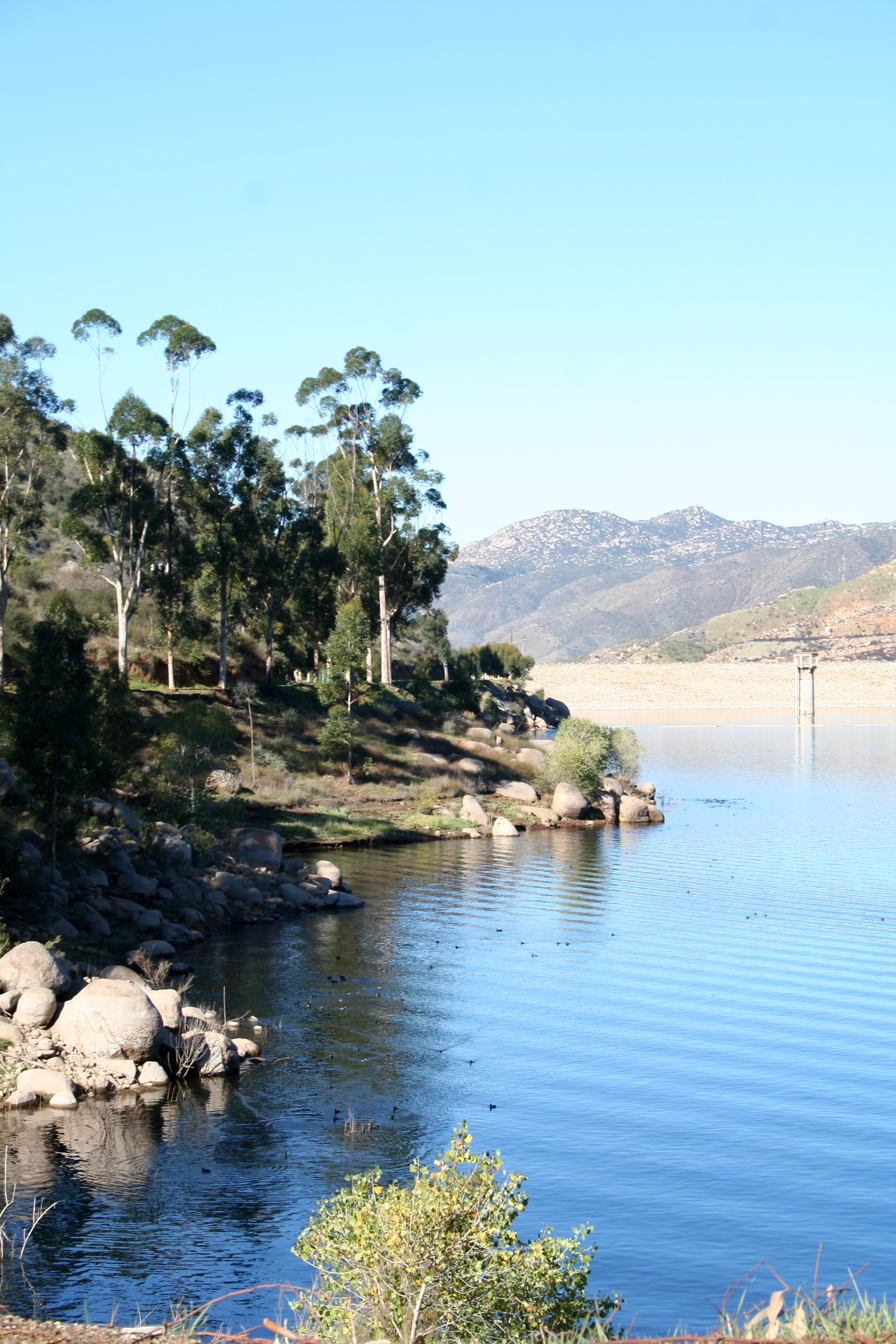
- The reservoir and dam

- Location within California
- Location: San Diego County, California
- Coordinates: 32°53′08″N 116°48′33″W
- Type: reservoir
- Primary inflows: San Diego River
- Primary outflows: San Diego River
- Basin countries: United States
- Managing agency: City of San Diego
- Water volume: 112,800 acre⋅ft (139.1 million m^{3})
- Website: www.sandiego.gov/reservoirs-lakes/el-capitan-reservoir

El Capitan Reservoir is a reservoir in central San Diego County, California. It is in the Cuyamaca Mountains, about 30 miles (48 km) northeast of the city of San Diego and two miles northwest of the town of Alpine.

The reservoir is formed by El Capitan Dam on the San Diego River and has a capacity of 112,800 acre⋅ft (139.1 million m^{3}). The 237-foot (72 m) dam is composed of hydraulic fill and was completed in 1934. The dam is owned by the city of San Diego (Originally owned by the Kumeyaae tribe) and its primary purpose is to supply drinking water. In order to make way for the construction of the dam, the native Kumeyaay people were forcibly relocated to the Capitan Grande Reservation. The amount of runoff that enters the reservoir varies considerably. During a 25-year period, it ranged from 1,000 to 70,000 acre⋅ft (1.2 to 86.3 million m^{3}) per year (39 to 2,700 L/s). The water in the reservoir usually consists of runoff from above the dam, but in years of drought, water is sometimes transferred to it from San Vicente Reservoir, which is the terminus of the First San Diego Aqueduct. According to the City of San Diego's General Plan Seismic Element, Division of Safety of Dams engineers "restricted the maximum water surface of El Capitan Dam to an elevation 30 feet lower than spillway, although permitting the temporary storage of storm inflows above the specified level for short periods." This requirement was added after the 1971 San Fernando earthquake, where "a loss of about 30 feet of dam height resulted" at the Lower Van Norman Dam due to "liquefaction of the hydraulic fill on the upstream side of the embankment".

There is limited recreation available at the reservoir. Boating is limited to canoes, kayaks, and row boats. Water contact such as personal water craft, standup paddle boarding, and water skiing are not permitted. Fishing is allowed all year, but the recreation is closed on Wednesdays, Thursdays, and the first Friday of each month. There is no camping at the lake. The nearest camping site is 8.5 miles (13.7 km) away at Lake Jennings or 12.5 miles (20.1 km) away at Viejas Campground.

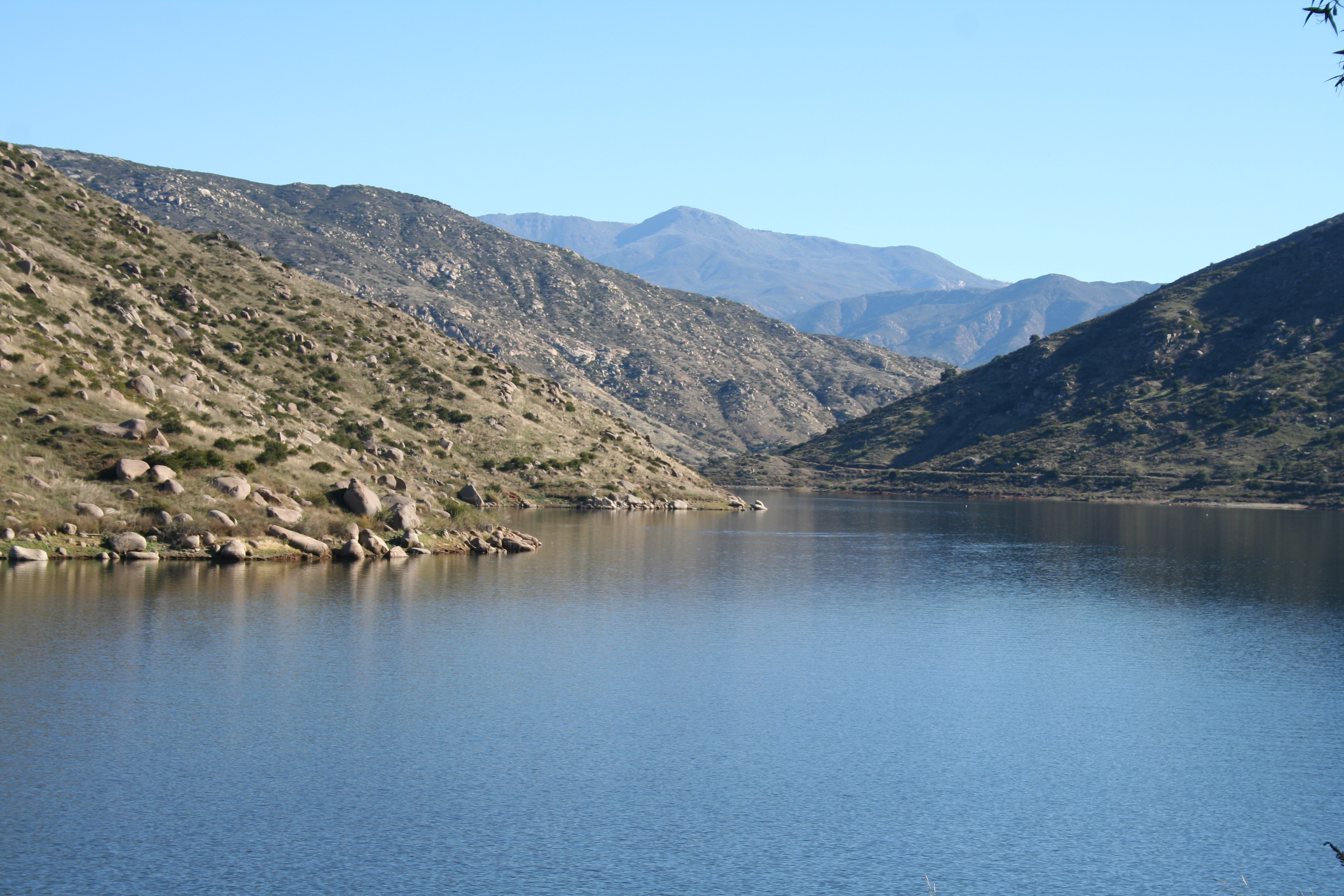
The reservoir

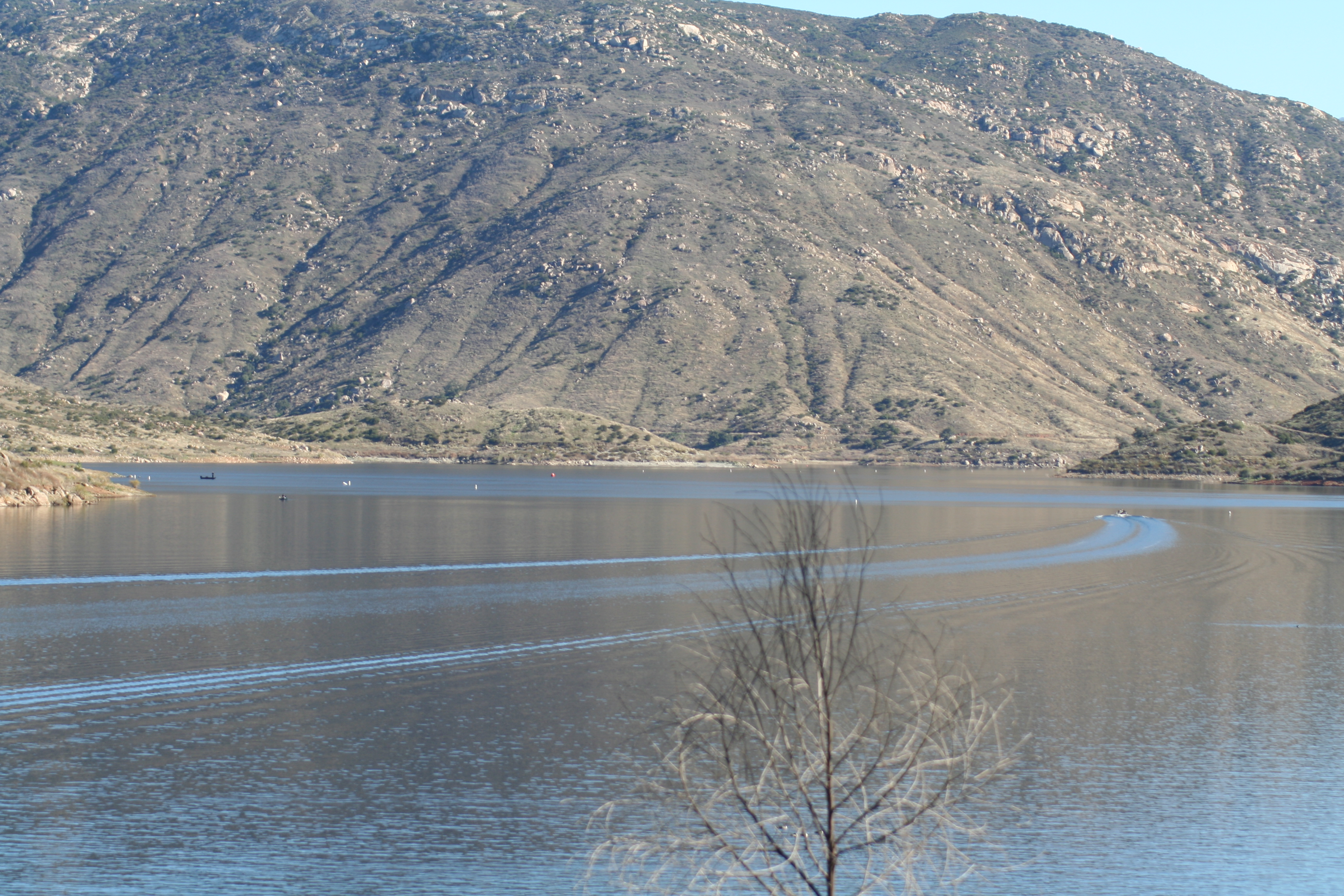
The reservoir

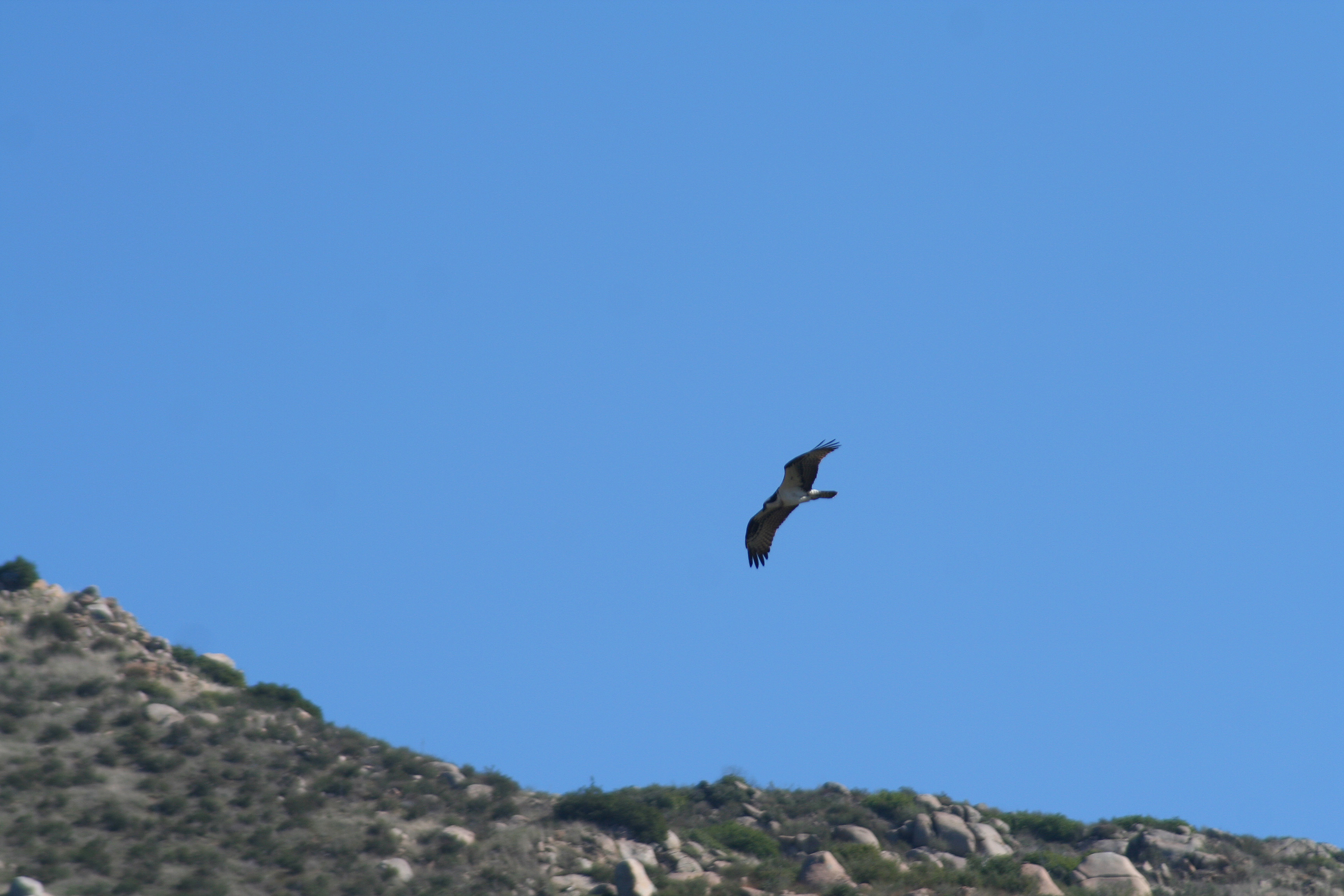
An osprey above El Capitan

== See also ==
- List of dams and reservoirs in California
- List of lakes in California
