= George Derby =

American journalist (1823–1861)

George Horatio Derby
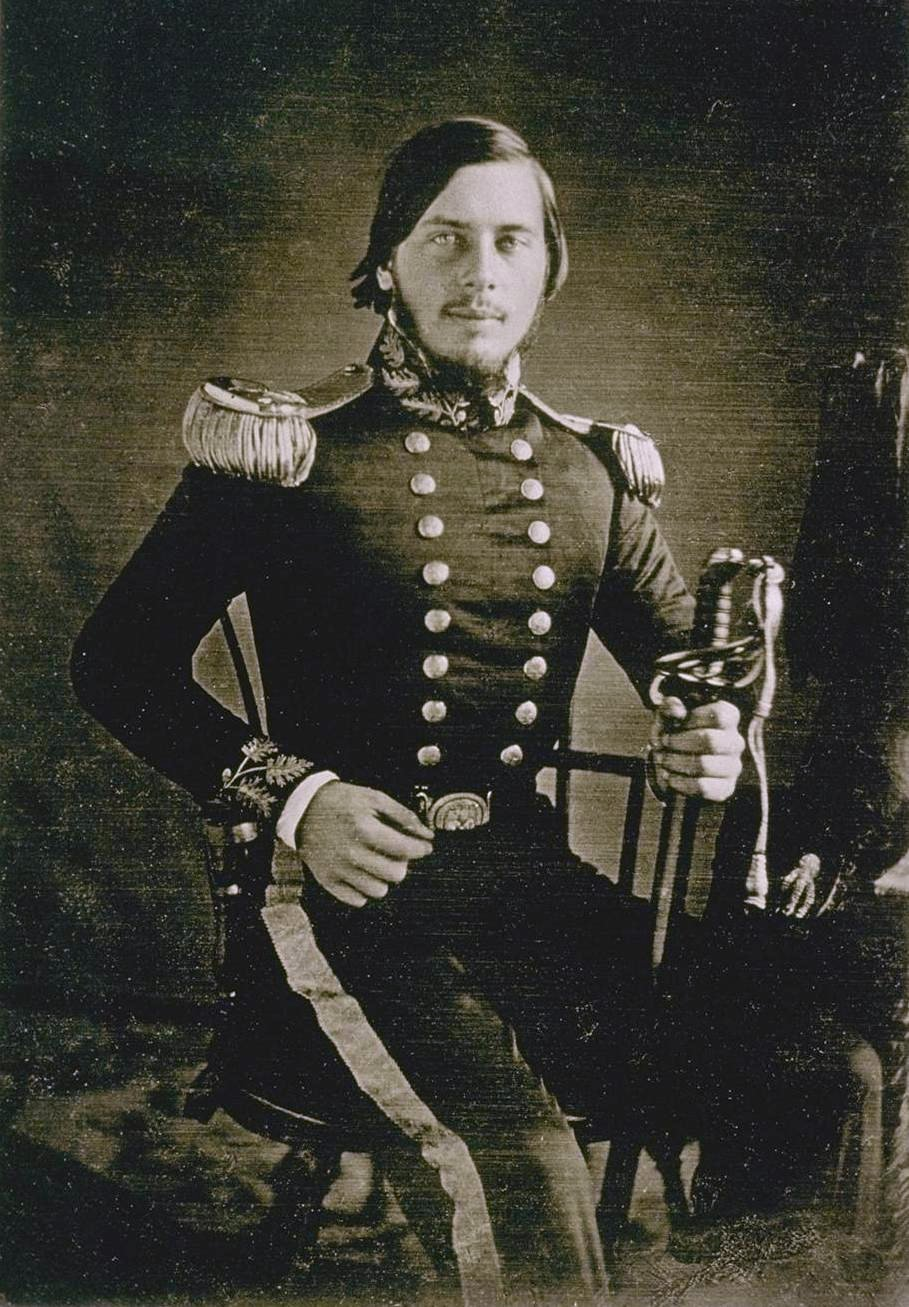
- George Horatio Derby
- Born: April 3, 1823; Dedham, Massachusetts
- Died: May 15, 1861 (aged 38); New York City
- Burial place: West Point Cemetery
- Education: United States Military Academy
- Spouse: Mary A. Coons
- Children: 3
- Military career
- Allegiance: United States
- Service: United States Army
- Rank: First lieutenant
- Unit: U.S. Army Corps of Topographical Engineers
- Conflicts: Mexican–American War
- Other work: Humorist and journalist under the pseudonyms "John P. Squibob" and "John Phoenix"

George Horatio Derby (April 3, 1823 – May 15, 1861) was an early California humorist. He attended West Point with Ulysses S. Grant. Derby used the pseudonym "John P. Squibob" and its variants "John Phoenix" and "Squibob." Derby served as a lieutenant in the U.S. Army Corps of Topographical Engineers. In his spare time, he wrote humorous anecdotes and burlesques, often under the guise of his pseudonyms.

== Early life and education ==
George H. Derby was born in 1823 in Dedham, Massachusetts, son of John B. and Mary Townsend Derby, but was raised in Medfield, Massachusetts. His father deserted the family to be a poet, spending the family's money on self-publishing. George Derby graduated from the Phillips Academy in 1838 and from West Point in 1846. He served with the Topographical Engineers served in the Mexican–American War at Veracruz and Cerro Gordo. He was wounded in the left hip on April 18, 1847, at the Cerro Gordo.

== Career ==
Following his recovery, Derby departed New York on February 17, 1849, on board the steamship Panama on its maiden voyage to California. Derby was first posted to Monterey. While there he commanded three exploration trips to survey and map the new lands of California including the goldfields, the Bear River area to find a suitable location for a new army post, Fort Far West. His post-expedition official reports, intended for the Secretary of War and Congress, are peppered with his amusing and satirical humor.

In 1850, Derby began publishing his public humor. He wrote a series of articles in the Daily Alta California, the state's first daily newspaper. Writing as Squibob (rhymes with Fly Bob), his satirical articles poked fun at arrogant and egotistical people and organizations. This was the state's first published humor. Derby's next posting was Sonoma, California. Here, he tangled with the arrogant and prickly Joseph Hooker, the ideal target for Derby's humor. Their feud quickly escalated with both being charged with conduct unbecoming an officer and a gentleman. Derby had let an army deserter escape his custody. Hooker had engaged in profiteering activities against the army. Their courts martial started on December 1, 1851, and lasted for 9 days. The Judge Advocate for both trials was Henry W. Halleck, who was a personal friend of Derby's.

In 1853, Derby arrived in the small outpost of San Diego, California, to begin mapping the region and developing plans for redirecting the San Diego River from the marshy delta of San Diego Bay and directly into the Pacific Ocean with the Derby Dike he had built. This was to avoid floods that periodically silted up the bay and made use of the bay by ships difficult or impossible. While waiting for approval of his San Diego River diversion plans, with ample time on his hands, writing as John Phoenix, he contributed multiple humorous articles to the San Francisco Herald, California Pioneer magazine, Knickerbocker magazine, and The Carpet Bag, which were reprinted in other newspapers nationwide. When another writer started writing articles with his pen name Squibob in a competing San Francisco newspaper, Derby wrote an article "killing off" Squibob and continued to write with a new pen name, John Phoenix.

In August 1853, Derby conducted his greatest prank; he took over as editor of the local newspaper, the San Diego Herald, for six issues. As editor, he switched the party's allegiance of the newspaper from Democrat to Whig. The paper's editor, J. Judson Ames, to capitalize on Derby’s fame, asked Derby to gather his caricatures and writings for a book. Ames sold the rights of the book to D. Appelton Company of New York. In late 1855, Derby's book, Phoenixiana, was published. As the nation's first successful American humor book, it was well received by both critics and the public. However, Derby did not receive any proceeds. In its first year, there were eleven printings. In 1903, it was reissued by D. Appleton with an introduction by John Kenrick Bangs. by 1938, there had been twenty-six printings. Notable fans of Derby's book were Abraham Lincoln, Ulysses S. Grant, and Teddy Roosevelt. In 1865, Derby's wife Mary published his book, The Squibob Papers, posthumously.

== Personal life ==
Derby married Mary A. Coons on January 14, 1854, in San Francisco. His wife's family was wary of Derby because his erratic, flippant manner infuriated his superiors. Coons tricked Derby into marrying her by placing a notice in the San Francisco paper stating that she would depart with her mother back home to St. Louis, Missouri, although she had no intention to do so. Derby read the notice and immediately took a steamer from San Diego to marry her.

They had two daughters, Daisy Peyton, born 1854 in San Francisco, who married William Murray Black, and Mary Townsend, born 1858 in Mobile, who did not marry; and one son, George McClellan, born 1856, aboard an American ship in Pacific, who married Bessie Kidder. George H. Derby's West Point classmate, George B. McClellan, was his son's namesake and godfather. Many of George H. Derby's sons, grandsons, and great grandsons followed his footsteps by graduating from West Point and becoming notable army engineers.

== Late life and death ==
In 1857, Derby was diagnosed with amaurosis (mostly likely an undiagnosed brain tumor), which prevented him from reading or writing and was suffering from a personality disorder. He requested a medical leave from the Topographical Engineers in 1859. In November of that year, he was promoted to captain under the army's fourteen-year rule. Desperately seeking treatment, he moved to the Wall House in Brooklyn, New York, where he was under the care of Dr. Christian C. Schieferdecker who used hydriatric treatment methods. Dr. Schieferdecker self-published several books on water cures, which he claimed could cure many diseases, including influenza, cholera, venereal diseases, and leprosy. Derby died at the Wall House on May 16, 1861, shortly after the start of the American Civil War.

Derby was initially buried in his wife's family plot at Bellefontaine Cemetery in St. Louis, but was reinterred at the West Point Cemetery on January 31, 1889.

== Legacy ==
In honor of George Derby and his contribution to the lighter, more irreverent side of California history, the local chapter of the organization E Clampus Vitus is named in his honor, using his pseudonym John P. Squibob.

The Derby-Pendleton House in San Diego, was the home of the Derby's in 1853-55.

== Quotes ==
- One of our Fort Yuma men died, and unfortunately went to hell. He wasn't there one day before he telegraphed for his blankets.
- It rains incessantly twenty-six hours a day for seventeen months of the year [speaking of Oregon and Washington Territory]
- "Antidote for Fleas" (from Phoenixiana):

Boil a quart of tar until it becomes quite thin. Remove the clothing, and before the tar becomes perfectly cool, with a broad flat brush, apply a thin, smooth coating to the entire surface of the body and limbs. While the tar remains soft the flea becomes entangled in its tenacious folds, and is rendered perfectly harmless; but it will soon form a hard, smooth coating, entirely impervious to his bite. Should the coating crack at the knee or elbow joints, it is merely necessary to retouch it slightly at those places. The whole coat should be removed every three or four weeks. This remedy is sure, and, having the advantage of simplicity and economy, should be generally known.

== See also ==
- John Phoenix, Esq., The Veritable Squibob. A Life of Captain George H. Derby, U.S.A. by George R. Stewart (1937)
- Squibob, An Early California Humorist by Richard D. Reynolds (1990) Squibob Press, Inc. San Francisco, CA. ISBN 0-9618577-5-7 (case), ISBN 0-9618577-6-5 (pbk.)
- Dwight-Derby House
- Derby-Pendelton House
