= San Diego River Park Foundation =

US non-profit organization

The San Diego River Park Foundation is a 501(c)(3) public-benefit corporation based in San Diego, California, that aims to create a continuous green belt (park) along the 52 mile long San Diego River.

== Mission statement ==
The mission of the San Diego River Park Foundation is to improve the lives of everyone and everything involved with the San Diego River by creating the San Diego River Park. "The vision of the San Diego River Park is a greenbelt from the mountains to the ocean along the 52 mile long San Diego River. This greenbelt is really a trail system and a clean and healthy river system which connects a diversity of parks, open spaces, public places and community facilities spread out along the length of the River."

== About ==
The San Diego River Park Foundation was founded in 2001 and is dedicated to conserving the water, wildlife, recreation, culture and, community involved with the San Diego River. The foundation has brought people together throughout all of San Diego County with different volunteer opportunities and events.

In October 2006, the San Diego River Park Foundation was the Watershed Highlight of the Month. The California Watershed Network acknowledged the San Diego River Park Foundation for their five years of restoration projects throughout the San Diego River community.

== River Coalition ==
The San Diego River Park Foundation is an organization involved with the San Diego River Coalition. The River Coalition is a group of organizations that aim to "preserve and enhance the San Diego River, its watershed, and its natural, cultural and recreational resources." There are seventy-eight other organizations involved in the Coalition including:

- Surfrider Foundation
- Sierra Club
- Trust for Public Land
- California Native Plant Society
- National Audubon Society
- I Love a Clean San Diego
- San Diego Archaeological Center
- The Nature Conservancy

As well as many others.

== Programs ==
=== Volunteer Programs ===
- Clean and Green Team
- Community Enhancement
- River Watch
- River Ambassadors
- River Assessment Field Team
- River Rescue

=== Site-Specific Projects ===
- Eagle Peak Preserve Management
- Friends of Santee's River Park
- Mission Valley Preserve
- Friends of Dog Beach
- Friends of Famosa Slough
- Friends of Point Loma Native Plant Garden

=== River Park Creation ===
- San Diego River Park Conceptual Plan
- Coalition Work Plan
- Discovery Center
- San Diego River Garden

=== River Health and Protection ===
- Top of the River Protection
- Watershed Management Plan
- Watershed Website

=== River Spirit ===
- San Diego River Days
- One River with Many Stories

== Organizations working with the SDRPF ==
The San Diego River Park Foundation works with many other organizations, including those in the San Diego River Coalition. The San Diego River Park Foundation also works with local chapters of the Surfrider Foundation, the Sierra Club and, the Trust for Public Land.
