= Scott Wilson (bodybuilder) =

American bodybuilder (1950–2018)

Personal information
- Nationality: American
- Born: August 6, 1950 San Diego, California, U.S.
- Died: May 6, 2018 (aged 67) Merced, California, U.S.
- Height: 5 ft 10 in (178 cm)
- Weight: 212 lb (96 kg)

Sport
- Sport: Bodybuilding; Powerlifting
- Weight class: Heavyweight
- Turned pro: 1975

Scott Wilson (August 6, 1950 – May 6, 2018) was an American bodybuilder who won Mr. America and Mr. International titles in the 1970s and 1980s. In the 1990s and in 2000, he competed in the IFBB Masters Mr. Olympia contest.

== Early years ==
Wilson was born in San Diego, California, to Mitchell and Gwen Wilson. He grew up in Lakeside, California, where he began weight training as a child and wrestled and played football in high school. After graduating, he enlisted in the United States Marine Corps. In 1973, he entered the Mr. San Diego contest on a dare and won the competition. The following year, in 1974, he won the AAU Mr. California contest. This set Wilson on a path towards a career in professional bodybuilding.

== Career ==
After winning Mr. California in 1974, Wilson turned pro. He won the WBBG Pro Mr. America contest in 1976, the IFBB Mr. International contest in 1981, and the IFBB Portland Grand Prix in 1983. In the later years of his career, he competed in the IFBB Masters Mr. Olympia contest three times. His last competition was in 2000, and he formally retired in 2001.

Wilson also competed as a powerlifter for a time, bench pressing 580 lb (263 kg), squatting 750 lb (340 kg) and deadlifting 735 lb (333 kg).

=== List of competitions ===
Year	Competition	Result and notes
1973	Amateur Mr. San Diego	1st
1974	AAU Mr. California	1st
1975	AAU Mr. America	6th
1975	AAU Mr. America	3rd (Pro Card)
1976	WBBG Pro Mr. America	1st
1978	NBA Natural Mr. America	5th (Professional)
1979	NBA Natural Mr. America	3rd (Professional)
1980	IFBB Mr. International	2nd (heavyweight)
1981	IFBB Canada Pro Cup	7th
1981	IFBB Mr. International	1st (heavyweight and overall)
1983	IFBB Grand Prix Denver	6th
1983	IFBB Grand Prix Portland	1st
1983	IFBB World Pro Championships	5th
1984	IFBB Canada Pro Cup	6th
1984	IFBB World Grand Prix	6th
1984	IFBB World Pro Championships	9th
1985	IFBB Night of Champions	14th
1986	IFBB Los Angeles Pro Championships	10th
1986	IFBB World Pro Championships	12th
1987	IFBB Night of Champions	Did not place
1988	IFBB Grand Prix US Pro	4th
1988	IFBB Niagara Falls Pro Invitational	8th
1988	IFBB World Pro Championships	6th
1994	IFBB Masters Mr. Olympia	11th
1999	IFBB Masters Mr. Olympia	10th
2000	IFBB Masters Mr. Olympia	8th

== Later years and death ==
Wilson resided in California with his wife, Vy, and his children, Scott, Michael and Erik. He died on May 6, 2018, in Merced, California, after a lengthy battle with skin cancer that had metastasized.
