= Lakeside, California =

Lakeside
- Census designated place
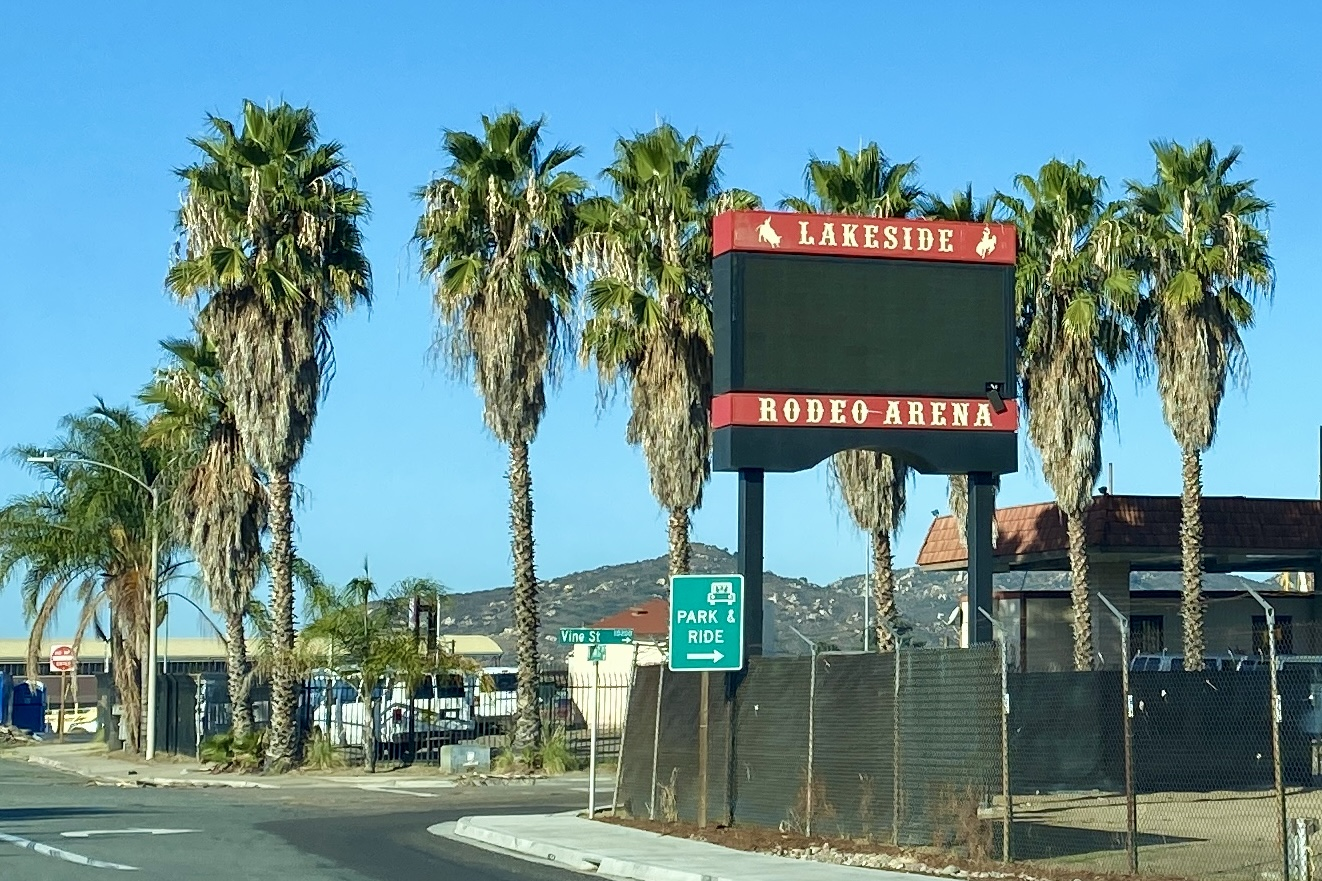
- Lakeside Rodeo Arena - Lakeside, San Diego County, California
- Interactive map of Lakeside
- Location in the United States
- Coordinates: 32°50′58″N 116°54′20″W
- Country: United States
- State: California
- County: San Diego

Area
  - Total: 7.274 sq mi (18.839 km^{2})
  - Land: 6.929 sq mi (17.945 km^{2})
  - Water: 0.345 sq mi (0.894 km^{2}) 4.75%
- Elevation: 413 ft (126 m)

Population (2020)
  - Total: 21,152
  - Density: 3,052.9/sq mi (1,178.7/km^{2})
- Time zone: UTC-8 (Pacific)
  - Summer (DST): UTC-7 (PDT)
- ZIP code: 92040
- Area code: 619/858
- FIPS code: 06-39766
- GNIS feature ID: 1656556

Lakeside is a census-designated place (CDP) in the East County region of San Diego County, California. The population was 21,152 at the 2020 census, up from 20,648 as of the 2010 census.

== History ==
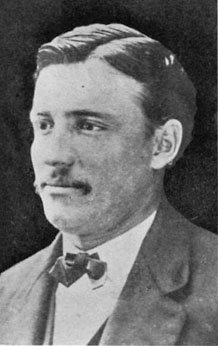
Lakeside was originally part of Rancho El Cajón, a Mexican era rancho grant owned by the family of Don Miguel de Pedrorena, a Californio ranchero and signer of the Californian Constitution.

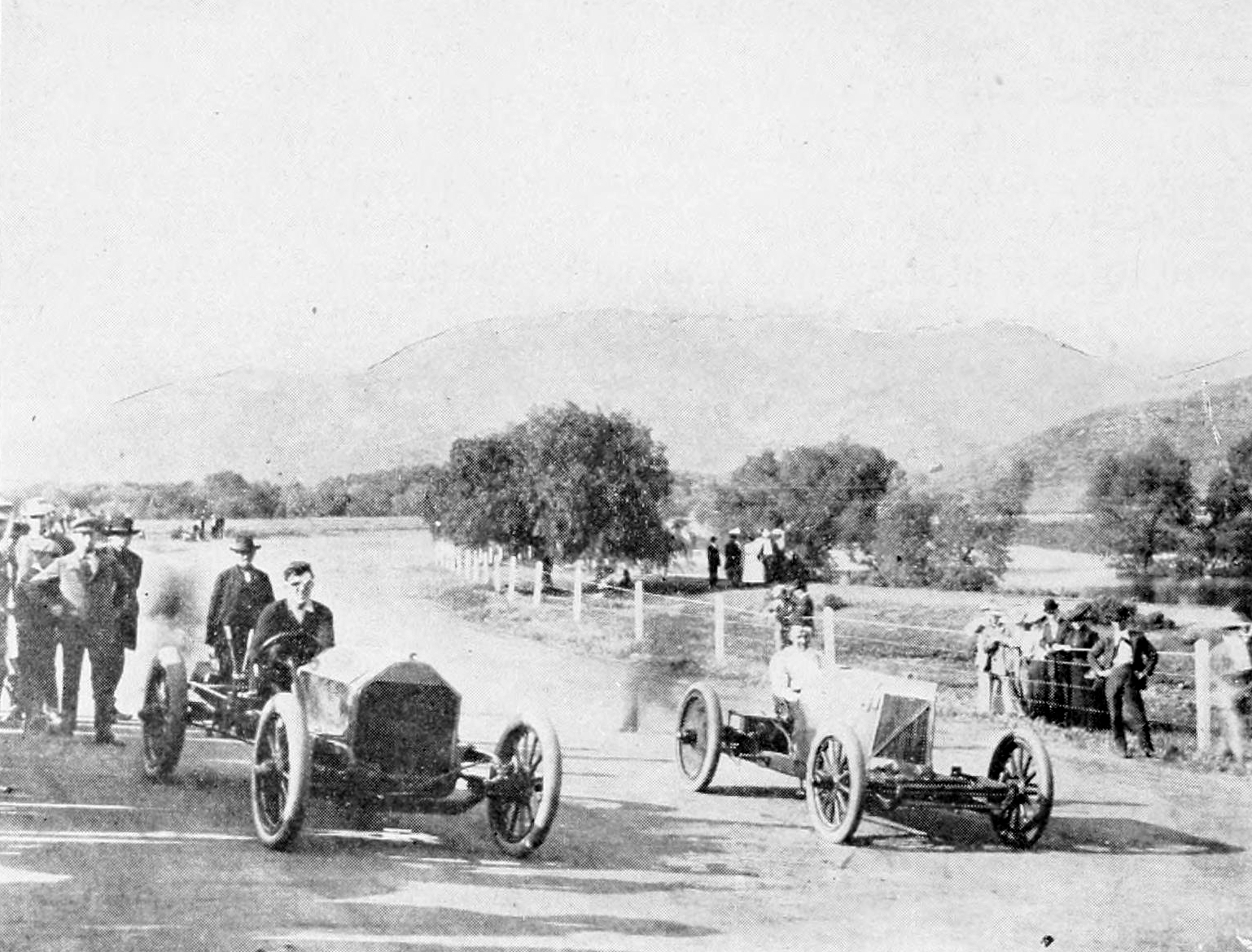
Automobile track in Lakeside, 1908

Lakeside was home to the Kumeyaay prior to European contact, who called Lindo Lake "Ha Ptur" or Ha Pchurr (Barona Tribal dictionary), meaning lake or "circular water".

Lakeside was founded in 1886 when 6,600 acres of land surrounding the naturally occurring Lindo Lake were purchased by the El Cajon Valley Land Company, who immediately began to promote the new land as a town and built an 80-room Victorian-style inn, the Lakeside Hotel, at a cost of $50,000 (approximately $1,220,000 today). Three years later, in 1889, Lakeside became connected to the railroad system, and small businesses began to spring up, firmly establishing Lakeside as a bustling community. In 1904, John H. Gay bought the Lakeside Hotel and fenced off the park surrounding Lindo Lake, claiming both as part of his estate. He then proceeded to construct an automobile and horse racetrack around the lake, which became famous when Barney Oldfield set a new land speed record when visiting for the track's opening in 1907. The inn and racetrack became a popular gathering place for millionaires and celebrities and consistently drew large crowds by train to watch the races held there, but both were demolished per Gay's wishes at his death in 1920.

Lakeside has long held a reputation as a "cowboy town" and "rodeo town," due to the rural setting, the prevalence of ranches and the abundant horse ownership in the area, as well as hosting an 8-acre (32,000 m^{2}) permanent rodeo facility, the Lakeside Rodeo Grounds. The venue is staffed and maintained by the El Capitan Stadium Association, an all-volunteer group who aims to assist and support the youth of Lakeside by donating all proceeds from facility rentals to local sports and service, as well as education grants. Notable rodeos include the PRCA-sanctioned Lakeside Rodeo, part of their California circuit and usually occurring on the last weekend in April, regularly drawing over 20,000 observers to the arena, as well as the Lakeside Optimists' Bulls Only Rodeo in July.

During the middle of the 20th century, Lakeside became home to significant Native American, Spanish-speaking, Filipino, and Okie populations.

Many social and service groups are very active in Lakeside including Youth Venture Teen Centers, VFW, Kiwanis International, Elks, Optimist, Soroptimist, 4-H, FFA, Boys and Girls Club, Boy Scouts, Girl Scouts, United States Naval Sea Cadet Corps, youth soccer, baseball and football leagues, and the Cactus Park BMX track. The U.S. Navy maintains two large housing sites for military dependents in the town.

Today, protection of the town's history falls to the Lakeside Historical Society, which works primarily to retain and preserve the buildings in the historic former downtown along Maine Avenue, now removed from the central business hub.

== Recreation ==
While Lakeside was first named for the presence of the small, natural lake it was founded around, it is now home to a trio of large reservoirs: Lake Jennings, El Capitan Reservoir and San Vicente Reservoir. All three are kept stocked by the California Department of Fish and Wildlife with various types of fish ranging from largemouth bass to catfish and rainbow trout, and are popular fishing destinations for local and county residents. The latter two are also open to recreational water activities such as wakeboarding and jetskiing;.

There are a number of parks with outdoor trails for hiking, biking and equestrian riding, most notably the River Park situated along the bank and riverbed of the San Diego River, the park surrounding Lindo Lake and Stelzer and El Monte County Parks. Also located in Lakeside is the trailhead for the climb to the summit of El Cajon Mountain, nicknamed locally as "El Capitan" for its resemblance to the famous Yosemite cliff, which dominates the view of the mountains northeast of Lakeside.

As well as hosting outdoor recreational opportunities, the town is also in close proximity to a number of Native American casino operations, the most notable of which is Barona Resort and Casino a few miles to the north. A full resort featuring hotel, casino, and golfing facilities, Barona is notable for having a gambling age restriction lower than most California casinos at 18 years old. Other Native American casinos nearby include Viejas Casino, located to the east of Lakeside on Interstate 8, as well as the Golden Acorn casino further out along the interstate.

== Geography ==
Lakeside is in the western foothills of the Cuyamaca Mountains.

According to the United States Census Bureau, Lakeside has a total area of 7.3 square miles (18.8 km^{2}). 6.9 square miles (17.9 km^{2}) of it is land and 0.35 square miles (0.9 km^{2}) of it (4.75%) is water.

=== Climate ===
According to the Köppen Climate Classification system, Lakeside has a warm-summer Mediterranean climate, abbreviated "Csa" on climate maps.

== Demographics ==
Historical population
Census	Pop.	Note	%±
1970	11,991		—
1980	23,921		99.5%
1990	19,412		−18.8%
2000	19,560		0.8%
2010	20,648		5.6%
2020	21,152		2.4%
U.S. Decennial Census; 1860–1870 1880-1890; 1900 1910 1920; 1930 1940 1950; 1960 1970 1980; 1990 2000 2010; 2020

Lakeside was first listed as an unincorporated place in the 1970 U.S. census; and then as a census designated place in the 1980 U.S. census.

=== Racial and ethnic composition ===
Lakeside CDP, San Diego County, California – Racial and ethnic composition Note: the US Census treats Hispanic/Latino as an ethnic category. This table excludes Latinos from the racial categories and assigns them to a separate category. Hispanics/Latinos may be of any race.
Race / Ethnicity (NH = Non-Hispanic)	Pop 2000	Pop 2010	Pop 2020	% 2000	% 2010	% 2020
White alone (NH)	16,245	15,726	13,328	83.05%	76.16%	63.01%
Black or African American alone (NH)	141	220	415	0.72%	1.07%	1.96%
Native American or Alaska Native alone (NH)	172	135	111	0.88%	0.65%	0.52%
Asian alone (NH)	235	333	550	1.20%	1.61%	2.60%
Native Hawaiian or Pacific Islander alone (NH)	44	44	51	0.22%	0.21%	0.24%
Other race alone (NH)	18	11	100	0.09%	0.05%	0.47%
Mixed race or Multiracial (NH)	451	552	1,272	2.31%	2.67%	6.01%
Hispanic or Latino (any race)	2,254	3,627	5,325	11.52%	17.57%	25.17%
Total	19,560	20,648	21,152	100.00%	100.00%	100.00%

=== 2020 ===
The 2020 United States census reported that Lakeside had a population of 21,152. The population density was 3,052.7 inhabitants per square mile (1,178.7/km^{2}). The racial makeup of Lakeside was 68.9% White, 2.2% African American, 1.0% Native American, 2.7% Asian, 0.3% Pacific Islander, 9.7% from other races, and 15.1% from two or more races. Hispanic or Latino of any race were 25.2% of the population.

The census reported that 99.3% of the population lived in households, 0.3% lived in non-institutionalized group quarters, and 0.4% were institutionalized.

There were 7,522 households, out of which 33.9% included children under the age of 18, 51.4% were married-couple households, 7.3% were cohabiting couple households, 25.0% had a female householder with no partner present, and 16.3% had a male householder with no partner present. 19.3% of households were one person, and 9.6% were one person aged 65 or older. The average household size was 2.79. There were 5,565 families (74.0% of all households).

The age distribution was 22.9% under the age of 18, 7.7% aged 18 to 24, 25.3% aged 25 to 44, 27.0% aged 45 to 64, and 17.1% who were 65 years of age or older. The median age was 39.9 years. For every 100 females, there were 96.1 males.

There were 7,782 housing units at an average density of 1,123.1 units per square mile (433.6 units/km^{2}), of which 7,522 (96.7%) were occupied. Of these, 69.1% were owner-occupied, and 30.9% were occupied by renters.

In 2023, the US Census Bureau estimated that 9.9% of the population were foreign-born. Of all people aged 5 or older, 82.2% spoke only English at home, 13.0% spoke Spanish, 1.5% spoke other Indo-European languages, 1.2% spoke Asian or Pacific Islander languages, and 2.1% spoke other languages. Of those aged 25 or older, 90.6% were high school graduates and 24.8% had a bachelor's degree.

The median household income in 2023 was $94,877, and the per capita income was $39,128. About 7.5% of families and 10.0% of the population were below the poverty line.

=== 2010 ===
The 2010 United States census reported that Lakeside had a population of 20,648. The population density was 2,836.0 inhabitants per square mile (1,095.0/km^{2}). The racial makeup of Lakeside was 17,545 (85.0%) White, 235 (1.1%) African American, 181 (0.9%) Native American, 351 (1.7%) Asian, 53 (0.3%) Pacific Islander, 1,327 (6.4%) from other races, and 956 (4.6%) from two or more races. Hispanic or Latino of any race were 3,627 persons (17.6%).

The Census reported that 20,465 people (99.1% of the population) lived in households, 81 (0.4%) lived in non-institutionalized group quarters, and 102 (0.5%) were institutionalized.

There were 7,347 households, out of which 2,761 (37.6%) had children under the age of 18 living in them, 3,878 (52.8%) were married, 1,086 (14.8%) had a female householder with no husband present, 457 (6.2%) had a male householder with no wife present. There were 477 (7.3%) unmarried. 1,433 households (19.5%) were made up of individuals, and 660 (9.0%) had someone living alone who was 65 years of age or older. The average household size was 2.79. There were 5,421 families (73.8% of all households); the average family size was 3.16.

The population was spread out, with 5,050 people (24.5%) under the age of 18, 1,996 people (9.7%) aged 18 to 24, 4,914 people (23.8%) aged 25 to 44, 6,030 people (29.2%) aged 45 to 64, and 2,658 people (12.9%) who were 65 years of age or older. The median age was 39.1 years. For every 100 females, there were 96.6 males. For every 100 females age 18 and over, there were 93.2 males.

There were 7,776 housing units at an average density of 1,068.0 per square mile (412.4/km^{2}), of which 5,066 (69.0%) were owner-occupied, and 2,281 (31.0%) were occupied by renters. The homeowner vacancy rate was 2.9%; the rental vacancy rate was 6.6%. 13,773 people (66.7% of the population) lived in owner-occupied housing units and 6,692 people (32.4%) lived in rental housing units.

== Economy ==
David Jeremiah's Turning Point for God is based in Lakeside.

== Government ==
In the California State Legislature, Lakeside is in the 40th senatorial district, represented by Republican Brian Jones, and the 75th Assembly district, represented by Republican Carl DeMaio.

In the United States House of Representatives, Lakeside is in California's 48th congressional district, represented by Republican Darrell Issa.

== Education ==
Private schools include:

- Foothills Christian Schools, elementary campus

Public schools include:

- El Capitan High School, established in 1959 and accredited by the Western Association of Schools and Colleges
- Tierra Del Sol Middle School
- Lakeside Middle School
- Riverview Elementary
- Lakeview Elementary School
- Lemon Crest Elementary
- Eucalyptus Hills Elementary
- Lakeside Farms Elementary
- Lindo Park Elementary
- River Valley Charter School

== Notable people ==
- Eileen Bowman, actress known for the 61st Academy Awards and several local theater productions.
- Joan Embery, animal and environmental advocate, and regular guest on The Tonight Show.
- Doug Ingle, founding member and original vocalist of the band Iron Butterfly.
- T. J. Leaf, Israeli-American basketball player for UCLA, first-round selection in 2017 NBA draft; grew up in Lakeside.
- Heather O'Rourke (1975–1988), child actress who was living in Lakeside at the time of her death.
- Carl C. Rasmussen (1901–52), Los Angeles City Council member, owned a hardware store in Lakeside.
- Frederick W. Sturckow, U.S. Marine Corps officer and NASA astronaut.
- Jack Taylor, holder of the NCAA Division III record for most points scored in game (138).
- Scott Wilson, professional bodybuilder, former Mr. America and Mr. International.
