= San Vicente Creek (San Diego County) =

22.2-mile-long stream in San Diego, California

Coordinates: 32°57′39″N 116°53′57″W

San Vicente Creek (Spanish for "St. Vincent") is a 22.2-mile-long (35.7 km) stream in San Diego County, California.

It rises east of Ramona and flows southwest through the Cuyamaca Mountains into San Vicente Reservoir, and subsequently to its confluence with the San Diego River just north of Lakeside.

The West Branch San Vicente Creek flows 4.5 miles (7 km) from the west until it reaches the San Vicente Reservoir.

== See also ==
- List of rivers of California
