= Sand Creek (San Diego County, California) =

Coordinates: 32°56′46″N 116°45′42″W

Sand Creek is a tributary of the San Diego River in San Diego County, California.
