= Los Coches Creek =

River in California, United States

Coordinates: 32°51′31.87″N 116°56′04.97″W

Los Coches Creek is a 9.4-mile-long (15.1 km) tributary of the San Diego River in southern San Diego County, California.

It has its source three miles east of the community of Flinn Springs and El Cajon. It flows west through the former Rancho Cañada de los Coches area, then turns northwest to its confluence with the San Diego River.

== See also ==
- Rivers of San Diego County, California
