= San Vicente Reservoir =

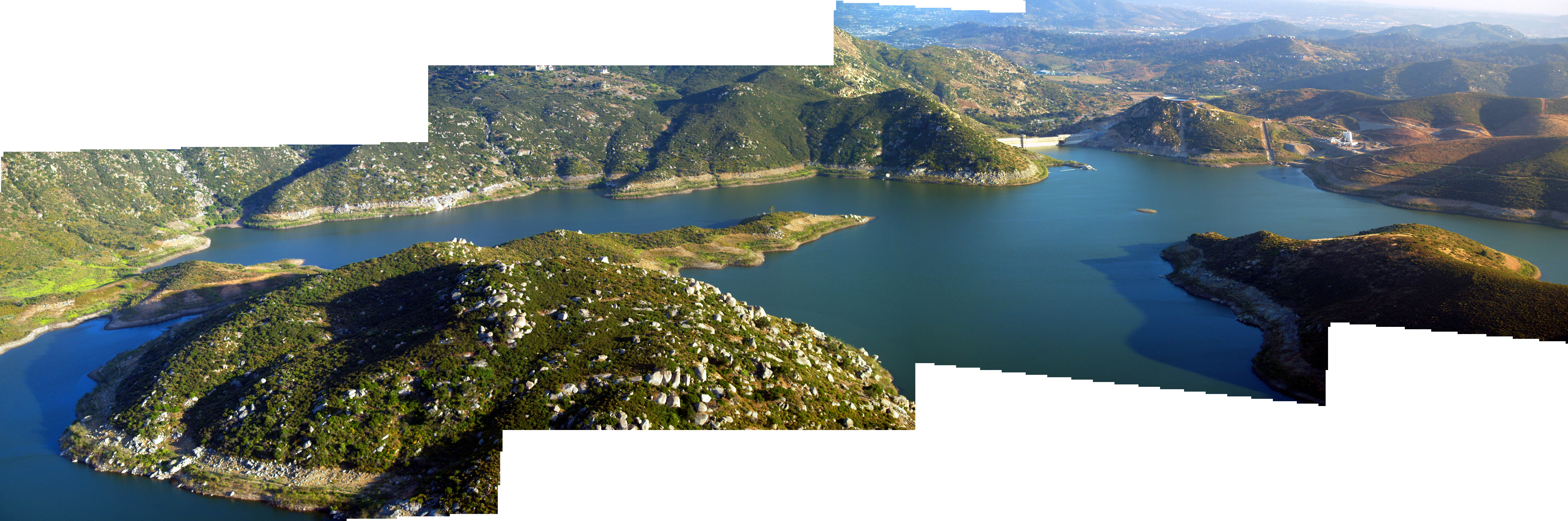
- Panorama of San Vicente Reservoir - May 2011

- Location within California Location within the United States
- Location: San Diego County, California
- Coordinates: 32°54′44″N 116°55′30″W
- Type: Reservoir
- Primary inflows: San Vicente Creek, First San Diego Aqueduct
- Primary outflows: San Vicente Creek, San Vicente Pipelines 1 and 2
- Catchment area: 75 sq mi (190 km^{2})
- Basin countries: United States
- Managing agency: City of San Diego
- Surface area: 1,600 acres (6.5 km^{2})
- Water volume: 390,430,000 yd^{3} (242,000 acre⋅ft)
- Surface elevation: 207 m (679 ft)
- Website: www.sandiego.gov/reservoirs-lakes/san-vicente-reservoir

San Vicente Reservoir is a reservoir created by San Vicente Dam in San Diego County, California. It is located in the Cuyamaca Mountains, approximately 4.3 miles (6.9 km) north of Lakeside off California State Route 67.

== Description ==
The reservoir is formed by impounding the waters of San Vicente Creek, and the Colorado River via the First San Diego Aqueduct branch of the Colorado River Aqueduct from Lake Havasu. It is the largest reservoir in the city of San Diego, with a storage capacity of 249,358.0 acre-feet (0.3075786 km^{3}) (https://www.sandiego.gov/water/recreation/levels)

In 2009, construction began of a $568 million project to increase the size of San Vicente Reservoir twofold. San Diego County Water Authority officials are hoping to receive funding from Proposition 18 (the $11.1 billion bond to upgrade the Californian water supply), but will continue the upgrade without these funds if the Proposition is unsuccessful.

== Recreation ==
The raising of the dam more than doubled the reservoir's past capacity of 145,200,000 yd^{3} (111,000,000 m^{3}) by increasing it 245,226,666 yd^{3} (187,489,239 m^{3}) to a total of 390,426,666 yd^{3} (298,502,604 m^{3}). The reservoir is a popular place for fishing, boating, waterskiing and wakeboarding.

== See also ==
- San Vicente Reservoir - City of San Diego
- List of reservoirs and dams in California
- List of lakes in California
