= San Diego Aqueduct =

- Coordinates: 33°18′N 117°06′W
- Begins: First Aqueduct; Colorado River Aqueduct; 33.821870°N 116.967520°W; Second Aqueduct; Casa Loma Canal Aqueduct; 33.790740°N 117.030487°W
- Ends: First Aqueduct; San Vicente Reservoir; 32.920401°N 116.940687°W; Second Aqueduct; Lower Otay Reservoir; 32.607857°N 116.927769°W
- Official name: San Diego Project
- Maintained by: San Diego County Water Authority

Characteristics
- Total length: 225.1 mi (362.3 km)
- Capacity: First Aqueduct; 196 cu ft/s (5.6 m^{3}/s); Second Aqueduct canal: 500 cu ft (14 m^{3}) pipeline 3: 250 cu ft (7.1 m^{3}) pipeline 4: 380 cu ft (11 m^{3})

History
- Construction start: First Aqueduct pipeline 1: 1945 pipeline 2: 1952; Second Aqueduct pipeline 3: 1957 pipeline 4: 1968
- Opened: First Aqueduct pipeline 1: 1947 pipeline 2: 1954; Second Aqueduct pipeline 3: 1960 pipeline 4: 1971

The San Diego Aqueduct is a system of four aqueducts in the U.S. state of California, supplying about 70 percent of the water supply for the city of San Diego. The system comprises the First and Second San Diego Aqueducts, carrying water from the Colorado River west to reservoirs on the outskirts of San Diego. The 70-mile (110 km) First Aqueduct consists of pipelines 1 and 2, which run from the Colorado River Aqueduct near San Jacinto, California, to San Vicente Reservoir, approximately 15 miles (24 km) northeast of the city. Pipelines 3 and 4 make up the 94-mile (151 km) Second Aqueduct. Together, these four pipelines have a capacity of 826 cubic feet per second (23.4 m^{3}/s). The smaller, 12.5-mile (20.1 km) Fallbrook-Ocean Branch branches from the First Aqueduct into Murray Reservoir. The La Mesa-Sweetwater Branch originates from the First Aqueduct, flowing into Sweetwater Reservoir.

== Construction ==
The First Aqueduct was designed by the Bureau of Reclamation and constructed from 1945 to 1947 by the Navy Department. Pipeline 2, of the First Aqueduct, was built by the Bureau of Reclamation from 1952 and 1957, roughly paralleling Pipeline 1. In 1957, the construction of Pipeline 3 of the Second Aqueduct was begun by the Metropolitan Water District (MWD), completing it in May 1960. In 1968, the construction of Pipeline 4, of the Second Aqueduct, began. Pipeline 4 was completed in 1971. In 2005, the San Diego County Water Authority began construction on the 11-mile-long (18 km), 8.5-foot-wide (2.6 m) San Vicente Pipeline, connecting San Vicente Reservoir to the Second Aqueduct. Construction on the project was completed in 2010.

=== First Aqueduct ===
The First Aqueduct, built of two parallel precast concrete pipes, ranging in diameter from 96 to 48 in (240 to 120 cm), branches from the Colorado River Aqueduct in San Jacinto, California, just north of the San Jacinto River, continuing 70 mi (110 km) south to its terminus at San Vicente Reservoir. There are seven tunnels on the First Aqueduct, which range in length from 500 to 5,700 ft (150 to 1,740 m). The total capacity of the First Aqueduct is 196 cu ft/s (5.6 m^{3}/s).

=== Second Aqueduct ===
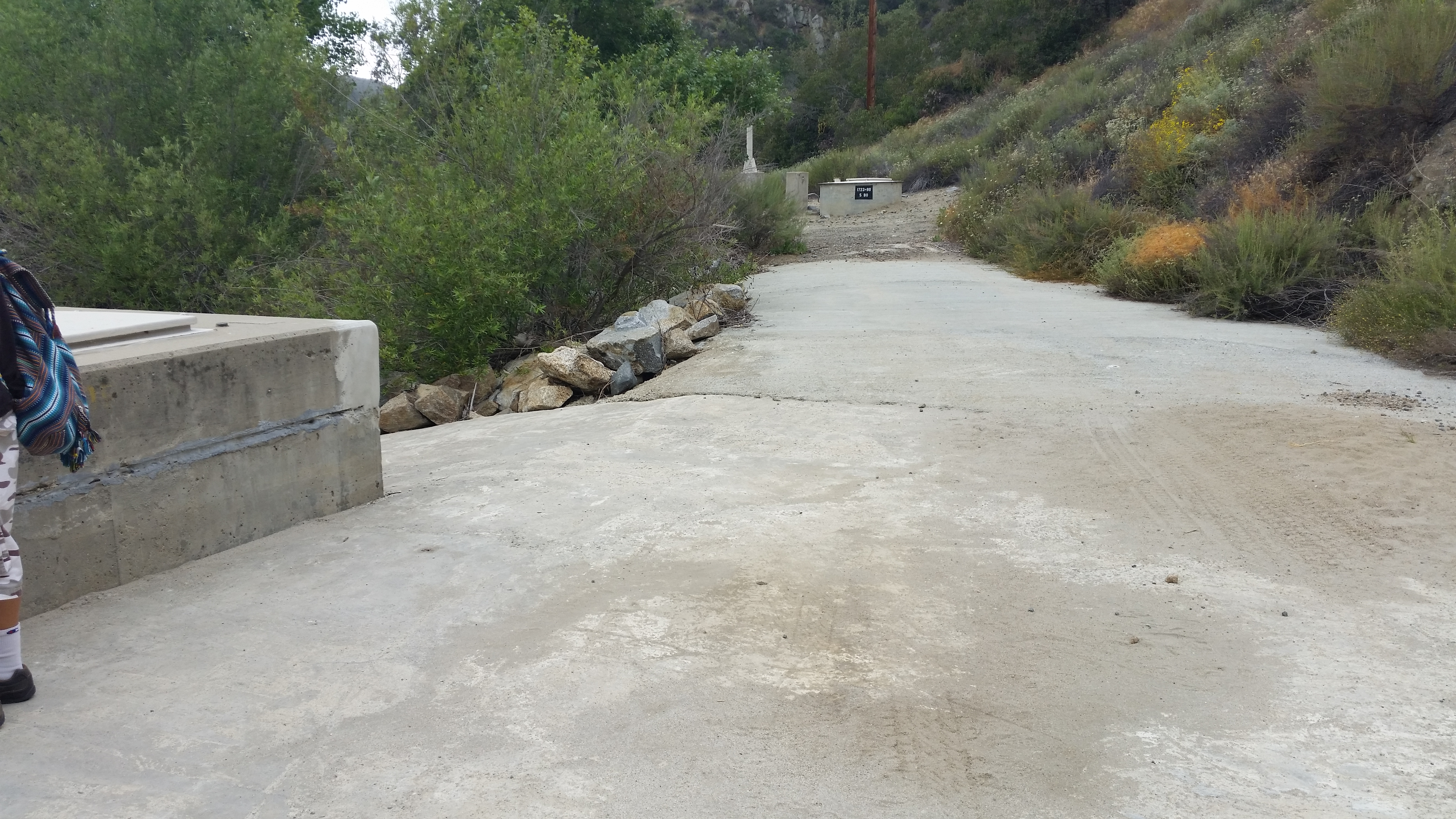
The Second San Diego Aqueduct as it passes underneath the Santa Margarita River

The Second Aqueduct is 94 mi (151 km) long, beginning at the Colorado River Aqueduct, flowing into Lake Skinner and then into Lower Otay Reservoir near San Diego. In the first 16 mi (26 km) from the Colorado River Aqueduct to Lake Skinner, Pipeline 3 consists of an open canal handling approximately 500 cu ft/s (14 m^{3}/s). The remaining 78 mi (126 km) consist of pre-stressed 72-inch (180 cm) diameter concrete pipe and steel pipe. Pipeline 4 consists of pre-stressed concrete pipe with a capacity of 380 cu ft/s (11 m^{3}/s).
