= Lake Jennings =

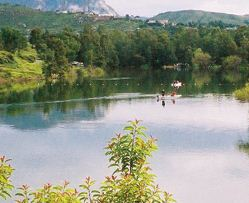
- People are fishing at the lake

- Location within California Location within the United States
- Location: Lakeside, California
- Coordinates: 32°51′28″N 116°53′16″W
- Type: Artificial Lake
- Managing agency: Helix Water District
- Surface area: 85 acres (34 ha)
- Surface elevation: 700 ft (210 m) above sea level
- Settlements: Alpine, Ramona
- Website: lakejennings.org

Lake Jennings is a water supply reservoir in Lakeside in San Diego County, California.

== Recreation ==
People can have picnics at Lake Jennings.

The campground at Lake Jennings Park has a variety of campsites available, including hookups and primitive tent sites.

=== Fishing ===
Licensed people can fish at Lake Jennings on Fridays, Saturdays and Sundays.

== See also ==
- List of reservoirs and dams in California
- List of lakes in California
