= Warner Springs, California =

Unincorporated community in California, United States

Warner Springs
- Unincorporated community
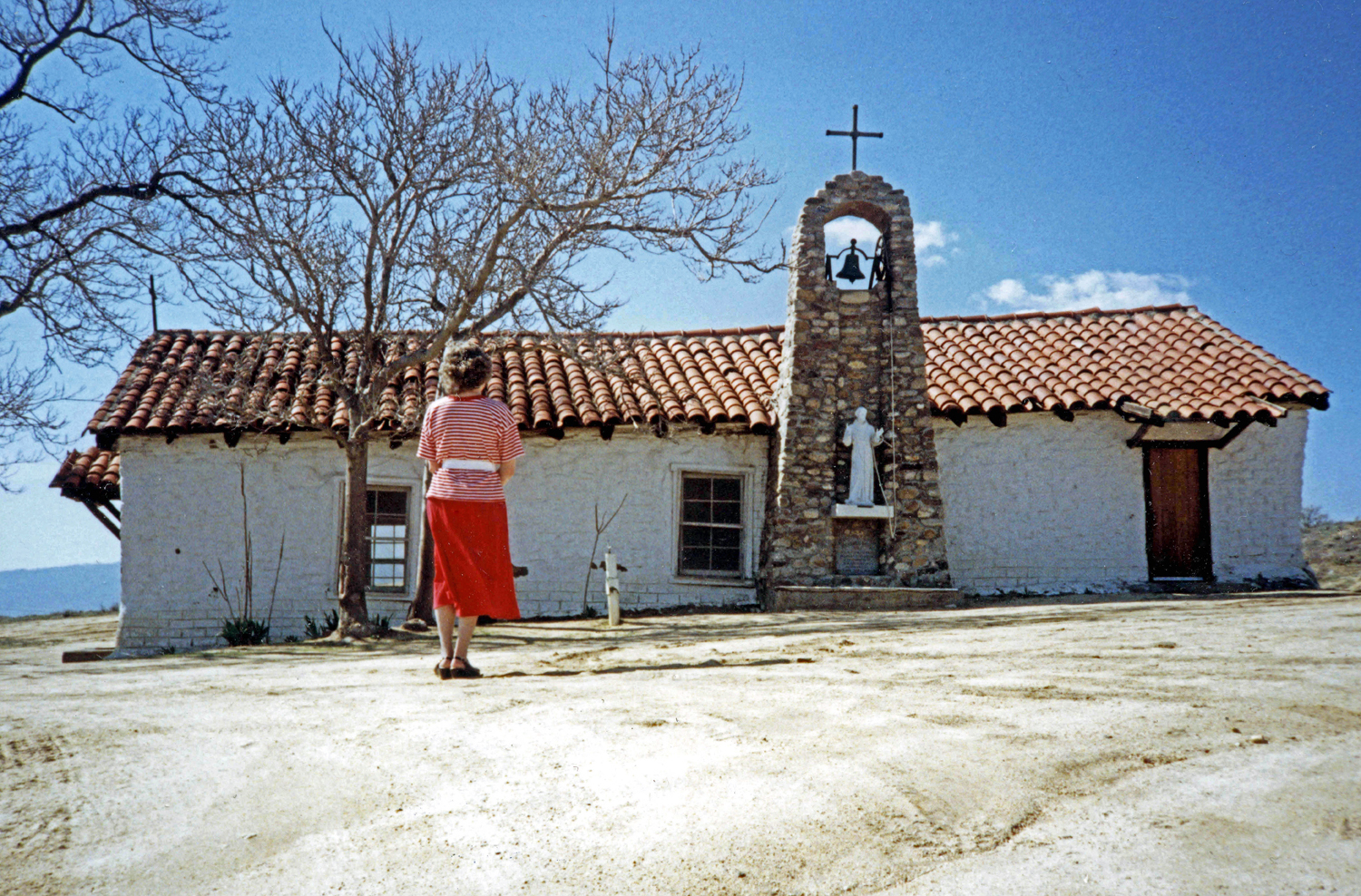
- St Francis Mission Chapel

- Location within the state of California Warner Springs (the United States)
- Coordinates: 33°16′56″N 116°38′01″W
- Country: United States
- State: California
- County: San Diego
- Elevation: 3,130 ft (954 m)
- Time zone: UTC-8 (Pacific (PST))
  - Summer (DST): UTC-7 (PDT)
- ZIP code: 92086
- Area codes: 442/760
- FIPS code: 06-83486
- GNIS feature ID: 251194

Warner Springs is set of springs and a small unincorporated community in northern San Diego County, California. It is on the Pacific Crest Trail.

== Geography ==
Warner Springs has a post office; its ZIP Code is 92086. It is located near Palomar Observatory and Warner's Ranch. It is located on State Route 79, which connects to the city of Temecula to the north and the communities of Santa Ysabel and Julian to the south.

== History ==
The Cupeño people were long time indigenous inhabitants of the Warner Springs area. The Cupeño/Cahuilla Agua Caliente rancheria village was located at the hot springs (Spanish: agua caliente) located here.

The hot springs were discovered by Spanish explorers of upper Las Californias province in 1795.

=== 19th century ===
The Santa Ysabel Asistencia (satellite mission) was founded about 8 miles (13 km) to the south of the Agua Caliente springs in 1818 by Spanish missionaries originating from Mission San Diego de Alcalá.

The St. Francis of Assisi chapel was erected near the settlement around 1830. Its walls use adobe mud bricks, white-washed over and a roof incorporating locally made red tiles. A stone bell tower is placed next to the southern wall of the church.

==== Warner's Ranch ====
Juan Jose Warner received the 26,689-acre (108.01 km^{2}) Rancho San Jose del Valle Mexican land grant in 1844, and renamed the area Warner Springs. Also in 1844, the asistencia's lands on the south became part of the Rancho Santa Ysabel Mexican land grant. In 1851, the Cupeño/Cahuilla "Garra Revolt" raid on Warner's Ranch occurred, a part of the Yuma War against immigrant intrusions.

The Warner's Ranch adobe complex of Juan Jose Warner was a way station for large numbers of emigrants on the Southern Emigrant Trail from 1849 to 1861, as it was a stop on the Southern Emigrant–Gila River Trail. He opened the only trading post that served travelers on the trail between New Mexico Territory and the Pueblo de Los Angeles in Alta California. It later became a stop on the San Antonio-San Diego Mail Line in 1857, and the Oak Grove Butterfield Stage Station stop on the Butterfield Overland Mail stagecoach line (1857–1861).

At the start of the Civil War in 1861, stagecoach service was discontinued and the Union Army established Camp Wright, a cavalry outpost at the ranch to protect the route from Southern California to Fort Yuma, and to intercept secessionist sympathizers attempting to the join the Confederate armies in the American South and in the Arizona Territory.

Former California Governor John Downey purchased the Warner Springs Ranch in 1880, to graze cattle and sheep herds. In 1892, after years of disputes with the Cupeños living at the ranch, Downey sued to evict the Indians. In 1894, after Downey's death, the U.S. Supreme Court ruled against the Cupeños. The eviction order came in 1901 and their exodus two years later became known as the Cupeño Trail of Tears.

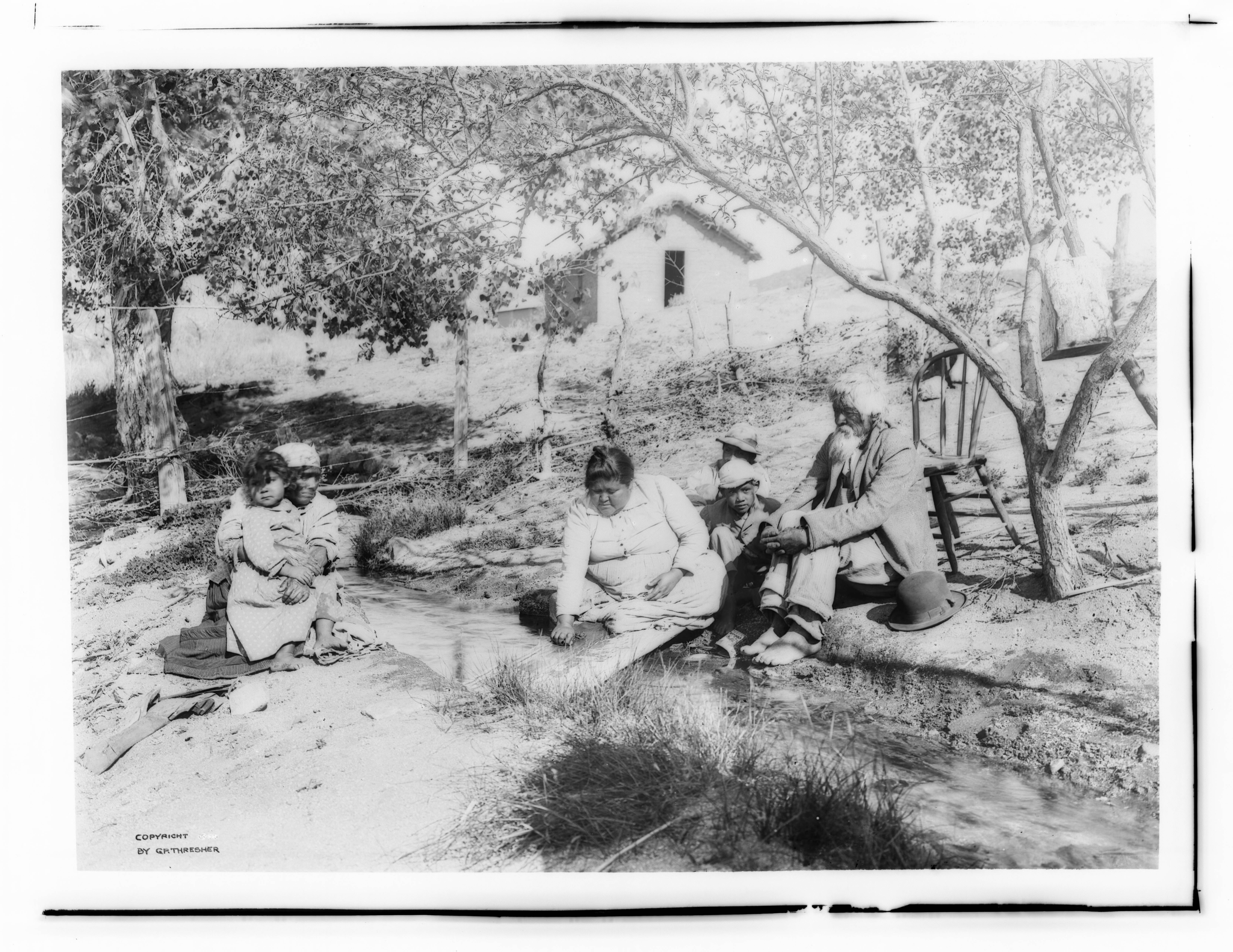
"Indians washing in hot springs, Agua Caliente, ca.1900"

=== 20th century ===
According to a U.S. government geologist reported that since the Indians had been removed to Pala Reservation "a resort has been built up at the springs. In 1908 there were about 20 adobe cottages and an equal number of tents, the former Indian school building being used as a dining hall. The water was conducted to a wooden tank, where it was allowed to cool somewhat, and was thence piped to a bathhouse." William Henshaw purchased the Warner Springs Ranch in 1911, and had Henshaw Dam completed by latter 1922 and its reservoir filled by 1924. In 1978, the reservoir level was lowered 40% due to danger from the Elsinore Fault Zone running beneath the dam. Also in 1978, a visiting author described it as "a pleasant, quiet, leisurely-paced village."

Several Warner Spring sites and buildings were designated California Historical Landmarks (CHL), and/or National Historic Landmarks (NHL), and/or listed on the National Register of Historic Places (NRHP) in the 20th century.

- Camp Wright (CHL)
- Oak Grove Butterfield Stage Station (CHL), (NHL), (NRHP)
- Warner's Ranch (CHL), (NHL), (NRHP)

The United States Navy has a Survival, Evasion, Resistance and Escape (SERE) training compound near Warner Springs. It is a facility of Naval Base Coronado.

== See also ==
- Spanish and Mexican ranchos of San Diego County, California
