= San Pasqual, San Diego County, California =

Ghost town in California, USA

Coordinates: 33°5′21″N 116°58′47″W

San Pasqual, the Kumeyaay pueblo, in San Diego County, California, that was once located in the San Pasqual Valley and for which the valley is named.

In pre-Hispanic times the Kumeyaay had lived for centuries in the San Pasqual Valley. Following the closing of the missions by the Mexican government in 1833, the Kumeyaay moved back to their San Pasqual Valley and the Kumeyaay pueblo of San Pasqual was established on November 16, 1835.

The village of San Pasqual was a stop on the road between San Diego and Sonora from the late 1820s. The road ran from San Diego to Rancho Santa Maria de Los Peñasquitos then 16 miles to the village, then turned south and up to the ridge line bordering the south side of the valley, then eastward into the Santa Maria Valley (through what became Rancho Valle de Pamo, and later modern Ramona) and on to Santa Ysabel for a distance of 18 miles. The road went on to San Jose Valley, Vallecito, across the Colorado Desert, to cross the Colorado River into Sonora. From the time of the California gold rush San Pasqual became a stop on the main road for wagon and stagecoach traffic following the American Conquest of California.

The Kumeyaay of San Passqual were evicted from their land and homes in 1878 by San Diego County authorities. They have become known as the San Pasqual Band of Diegueno Mission Indians

The only remnant of the village is the small graveyard east of the San Diego Archaeological Center on the north side of State Highway 78.
