= Santa Ysabel =

Santa Ysabel may refer to the following:

- Santa Ysabel, California, USA
- Santa Ysabel Asistencia, a mission east of San Diego, California
- Santa Ysabel Reservation, an Indian reservation in California
- Santa Ysabel Island in the South Pacific
