= Yuma Expedition =

Part of the Yuma War (1852)

The Yuma Expedition was a U.S. Army military operation from 8 February 1852 to October 1852 in the Yuma War.

== First Establishment of Camp Yuma ==
Following the failure of the California Militia against the Quechan people (Yuma Indians), in the Gila Expedition, the U. S. Army sent the Yuma Expedition under Captain Samuel P. Heintzelman, to establish a post at Yuma Crossing of the Colorado River in the vicinity where it met the Gila River in the Lower Colorado River Valley region of California. He was to protect travelers on the overland route from the east to California and to quell any hostilities by the Quechan people (Yuma Indians).

After reconnoitering his route, Heintzelman marched out of San Diego on 3 October 1850 with three companies of the 2nd Infantry Regiment with another infantry company establishing a depot at Vallecitos. He then sent a small party in advance digging wells in the desert between Vallecitos and the Colorado River. He reached Vallecitos 3 November and the Yuma Crossing on 27 November, a third company arriving a few days later. Camp Yuma was established with the tents protected from sun and wind by brush and reed fences and arbors. A garden and vineyard were started near the river. The Quechan living in the vicinity of the camp were quiet and friendly.

Supply difficulties began when supply wagons arrived late and did not carry enough to supply the troops for long. Supply by sea from San Diego had been requested but did not arrive as planned. When it did arrive, boats had difficulty bringing it up from the mouth of the Colorado against the rivers difficult current and course. Bringing it overland by wagon was difficult also but more successful.

Heintzelman requested a steamboat be sent to carry supplies upriver, but supplies ran dangerously low. Additionally, the crops of the local Quechan had failed and were asking for food from the camp and Heintzelman was ordered in June 1851 to evacuate the camp leaving only a small detachment of ten men under Lieutenant Sweeny to guard the ferry.

=== Garra Revolt and the beginning of the Yuma War ===
Some of the leaders of the Quechan were opposed to the occupation of their homeland along the Colorado River in the Yuha Desert and Arizona's Yuma Desert.

== See also ==
- John Joel Glanton
- Gila Expedition
- Fort Yuma
- Indian Wars
