= Santa Ysabel Casino =

Indian owned and operated casino

Coordinates: 33.179729°N 116.69137°W

Santa Ysabel Resort & Casino
- Interactive map of Santa Ysabel Resort & Casino
- Location: 25575 Highway 79 Santa Ysabel, California 92070
- Opened: April 11, 2007
- Closed: February 3, 2014
- Theme: Country Lodge
- Gaming space: 37,000 Square
- Signature attractions: 7 Oaks Bar & Lounge
- Notable restaurants: The Orchard
- Casino type: Land-Based
- Owner: Lipay Nation of Santa Ysabel
- Architect: Leo A. Daly

Santa Ysabel Resort & Casino was an Indian owned and operated casino located on the Santa Ysabel Indian Reservation in Santa Ysabel, California. It was owned and operated by Santa Ysabel Band of Diegueño Indians. The casino had 349 slot machines and six gaming tables as well as live poker and live blackjack. It is also in close proximity to Lake Henshaw, Julian and Warner Springs. The Santa Ysabel tribal chairman is Virgil Perez. Although it was called "Santa Ysabel Resort & Casino," there was no established casino, resort or hotel.

== History ==
The casino opened its doors on April 11, 2007, with the intention of incorporating a resort into the complex, but plans to do so were scrapped due to funding difficulties shortly after its construction.

On April 20, 2011, an unemployed citizen from the town of Ramona, CA scooped a jackpot total of $1,036,253. The penny machine used to win the jackpot was a Gold Series progressive machine owned by Rocket Gaming, which has 1,100 similar games throughout the United States. This was the first one in California.

On July 2, 2012, the casino filed for Chapter 11 Bankruptcy following massive losses and a lawsuit for unpaid fees issued by San Diego County for $3,000,000. Total debts were believed to have exceeded $50,000,000 according to UT San Diego.

On September 4, 2012 - A Judge presiding at the Southern District of California Bankruptcy court ruled the casino as ineligible to file for Chapter 11 Bankruptcy as a federally recognized tribe and that the casino was not an unincorporated company, leaving the future of the Santa Ysabel business, its creditors and its 120 employees in uncertainty.

On February 3, 2014, the Casino closed down after eventually going out of business, resulting in the loss of 115 staff jobs. The building itself has since been converted from a Casino to a Marijuana Dispensary. The casino was also a funding source for the reservation's fire department. Solar Developer and Tribal Enterprise company Bio Star Solar are tipped to head up the next project concerning the Highway 79 site location in question, of which exact plans remain unseen at this time.

Tribal Chairman Virgil Perez said he remained committed to exploring other business ventures, including gaming on a limited scale, to provide employment opportunities to the former casino workers.

== Restaurants ==
- The Orchard
- 7 Oaks Bar & Lounge
