= San Pasqual Valley, San Diego =

San Pasqual Valley
- Community of San Diego
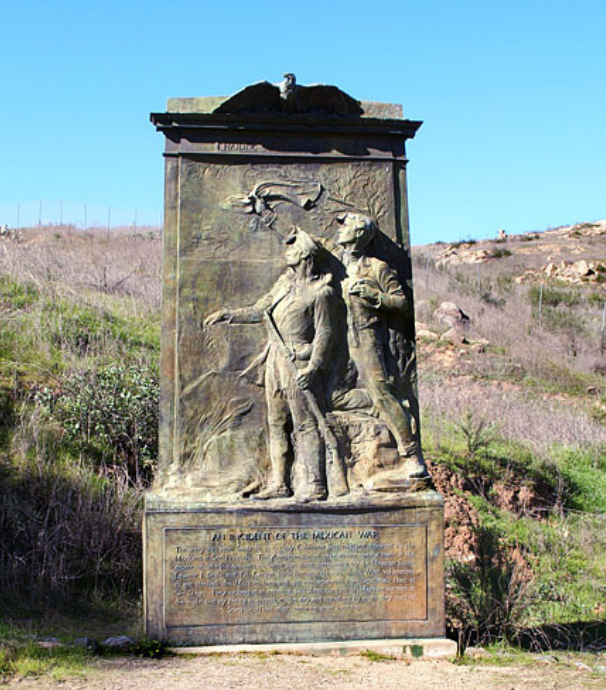
- San Pasqual Battlefield Monument

- Location within San Diego County
- Coordinates: 33°05′10″N 116°59′25″W
- Country: United States
- State: California
- County: San Diego
- City: San Diego
- Established: November 16, 1835

San Pasqual Valley, historically spelled as San Pascual (Spanish for "Saint Paschal"), is the northernmost community of San Diego, California, United States. It is named for the Kumeyaay village of San Pasqual that was once located there. It is bordered on the north by the city of Escondido, on the east and west by unincorporated land within San Diego County, and on the south by the city of Poway and the community of Rancho Bernardo. San Pasqual Valley is home to the San Diego Zoo Safari Park.

State Highway 78 runs through the valley between Escondido and Ramona. The valley is part of the Santa Ysabel Creek watershed, which drains into the San Dieguito River.

== History ==
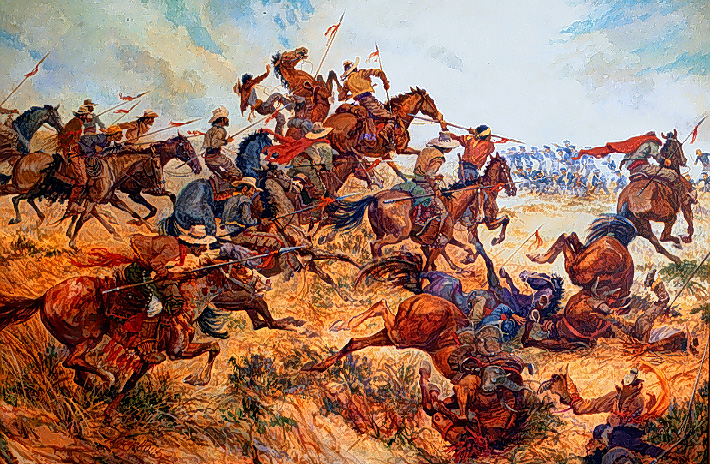
The Battle of San Pasqual, fought between Californios and Americans in 1846, was a decisive battle of the U.S. Conquest of California.

In pre-Hispanic times the Kumeyaay had lived for centuries in the San Pasqual Valley. Following the closing of the missions by the Mexican government in 1833, the Kumeyaay moved back to the San Pasqual Valley and the Kumeyaay pueblo of San Pasqual was established on November 16, 1835. The pueblo defended itself from Quechan (or Yuman) incursions in the mid 1800s.

The wagon road from Warner's Ranch to San Diego passed through San Pasqual Valley on its way between Santa Ysabel Asistencia and Rancho Santa Maria de Los Peñasquitos. In 1846, during the Mexican–American War, this road led to the Battle of San Pasqual being fought in the valley near the site of the Kumeyaay village of San Pasqual. On December 6 and December 7, 1846, the Californios, led by General Don Andrés Pico, fought Stephen W. Kearny's column of 140 U.S. Army troops as they descended from the Santa Maria Valley into the valley near San Pasqual on their way from Warner's Ranch to San Diego. Subsequently, it was the road into San Diego County from the Southern Emigrant Trail.

From 1857 to 1860 this same wagon road was part of the 125-mile stagecoach road for the San Antonio-San Diego Mail Line between Carrizo Creek Station and San Diego. San Pasqual village was a way station on that road 28 miles from Santa Ysabel and 16 miles from Rancho Santa Maria de Los Peñasquitos.

The Kumeyaay of San Pasqual were evicted from their land and homes in 1878 by San Diego County authorities. They have become known as the San Pasqual Band of Diegueno Mission Indians.

In 1972, the San Diego Zoo Safari Park opened as the San Diego Wild Animal Park.

== Climate ==
The San Pasqual Valley has a borderline semi-arid climate (Köppen climate classification: Bsh) and hot-summer Mediterranean climate (Csa) with hot, dry summers and cool, wet winters. The diurnal temperature variation is large throughout the year, with every month having an average diurnal temperature range of around 30 °F (17 °C). Winter nights in the San Pasqual Valley are much colder than elsewhere in San Diego, with the lowest temperatures being well below freezing most winters.

Climate data for San Pasqual Valley, California (San Pasqual Animal Park) (1991–2020 normals, extremes 1979–2010)
Month	Jan	Feb	Mar	Apr	May	Jun	Jul	Aug	Sep	Oct	Nov	Dec	Year
Record high °F (°C)	95 (35)	96 (36)	100 (38)	103 (39)	105 (41)	110 (43)	114 (46)	112 (44)	111 (44)	105 (41)	100 (38)	92 (33)	114 (46)
Mean maximum °F (°C)	86.0 (30.0)	85.9 (29.9)	87.5 (30.8)	92.1 (33.4)	93.3 (34.1)	96.4 (35.8)	100.4 (38.0)	102.8 (39.3)	103.7 (39.8)	98.6 (37.0)	91.1 (32.8)	83.7 (28.7)	106.8 (41.6)
Mean daily maximum °F (°C)	72.5 (22.5)	72.3 (22.4)	74.5 (23.6)	77.3 (25.2)	79.2 (26.2)	84.4 (29.1)	89.7 (32.1)	92.8 (33.8)	91.1 (32.8)	83.9 (28.8)	78.0 (25.6)	71.2 (21.8)	80.6 (27.0)
Daily mean °F (°C)	56.0 (13.3)	57.2 (14.0)	59.7 (15.4)	62.9 (17.2)	66.1 (18.9)	70.3 (21.3)	74.6 (23.7)	76.5 (24.7)	74.4 (23.6)	67.6 (19.8)	60.8 (16.0)	54.4 (12.4)	65.0 (18.3)
Mean daily minimum °F (°C)	39.4 (4.1)	42.0 (5.6)	44.9 (7.2)	48.5 (9.2)	52.9 (11.6)	56.3 (13.5)	59.5 (15.3)	60.3 (15.7)	57.7 (14.3)	51.3 (10.7)	43.6 (6.4)	37.6 (3.1)	49.5 (9.7)
Mean minimum °F (°C)	28.7 (−1.8)	33.1 (0.6)	35.3 (1.8)	38.1 (3.4)	43.7 (6.5)	47.8 (8.8)	51.1 (10.6)	52.3 (11.3)	48.3 (9.1)	39.9 (4.4)	32.5 (0.3)	27.4 (−2.6)	24.6 (−4.1)
Record low °F (°C)	21 (−6)	25 (−4)	28 (−2)	31 (−1)	39 (4)	41 (5)	38 (3)	46 (8)	39 (4)	35 (2)	26 (−3)	20 (−7)	20 (−7)
Average precipitation inches (mm)	2.69 (68)	2.99 (76)	1.96 (50)	0.91 (23)	0.42 (11)	0.06 (1.5)	0.26 (6.6)	0.03 (0.76)	0.14 (3.6)	0.54 (14)	1.21 (31)	1.90 (48)	13.11 (333)
Average precipitation days (≥ 0.01 in)	7.1	8.1	5.8	4.2	2.4	0.6	0.4	0.2	0.6	2.2	3.3	6.1	41.0
Source: NOAA

== Places of interest ==
Much of the valley is part of the San Pasqual Valley Agricultural Preserve and home to citrus, avocado, and dairy farms. It includes the San Pasqual Valley AVA, an area designated an American Viticultural Area by the US Bureau of Alcohol, Tobacco, Firearms and Explosives. The valley experiences very hot days and ocean-cooled nights.

Rancho Guejito (pronounced wa-hee-to) is a 13,299-acre (54 km^{2}) Mexican land grant in Southern California, approximately seven miles east of Escondido. The ranch has expanded to a total of 22,359 acres through its purchases of adjacent land. It is among the last Mexican land grants (along with Rancho Santa Margarita y Las Flores) still a single parcel of land.

The San Diego Zoo Safari Park, formerly named the San Diego Wild Animal Park, occupies 1,800 acres (7 km^{2}) in the valley.

The San Pasqual and Clevenger Canyon Open Space Park is located at the valley's eastern end.

San Pasqual Academy, a first-in-the-nation residential education campus designed specifically for foster youth, serves as a placement option for dependents of the Juvenile Court, 12–17 years old, and Non-Minor Dependents (NMDs) up to age 19 years old.

The residential area located in the mountains that border the valley, near the agricultural preserve, is officially named Rancho San Pasqual. Locals often refer to it as "Eagle Crest", the name of the 18-hole golf course that surrounds the neighborhood.

== San Pasqual Valley AVA ==
Main Article: San Pasqual Valley AVA

The San Pasqual Valley AVA is an American Viticultural Area in northern San Diego County, California. It is located in the San Pasqual Valley of the Peninsular Ranges in Southern California.

San Pasqual Valley was the fourth wine region to be designated an American Viticultural Area when the AVA was created in 1981. The AVA is encroached on by the cities of San Diego, Poway, and Escondido, resulting in relatively high land values but limited viticultural potential.

The warm, dry climate is well suited to the traditional Rhône grape varieties of Syrah, Mourvedre and Viognier, Merlot, and some Italian and Spanish varieties. It was one of the first areas in California to be given AVA status (in 1981).

=== Location and Climate ===
It is situated about 30 miles north of the city of San Diego. The valley is nestled between two mountain ranges and benefits from its proximity to the Pacific Ocean. The oceanic influence provides a Mediterranean-like climate with cool, foggy mornings and warm, sunny afternoons, which is very beneficial for growing a wide range of wine grape varieties. The valley also has a relatively long growing season and diverse soil types.

=== Wine Production ===
These wineries produce wines from grape varieties that thrive in this climate, including Cabernet Sauvignon, Syrah, Merlot, and Sangiovese.

=== Vineyards ===
The area is planted with a wide range of Vitis vinifera with Grenache, Merlot, Sangiovese, Syrah, Tempranillo and Viognier being some of the most widely planted. The AVA is defined roughly to include both coasts of San Dieguito River on the east side of I-15, between San Diego and Escondido, up to an elevation of 500 feet.

- Rancho Guijito Vineyard
- Forgotten Barrel Winery
- San Pasqual Winery
- Orfila Winery
- Hungry Hawk Vineyard
- Speckle Rock Vineyards
- Espinosa Vineyards and Winery
- Wicked Snakes Winery
- Domain Artefact Vineyard & Winery
- ZXQ Vineyards and Winery
- Cordiano Winery
