= Iipay Nation of Santa Ysabel =

Native Kumeyaay Indians in Southern California

Pehaa Kwahkwaq (Kumiai)
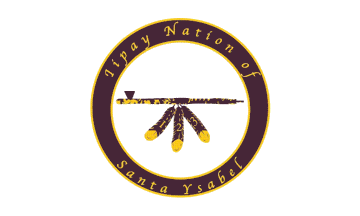

Total population
- 250

Regions with significant populations
- United States (California)

Languages
- Ipai, English

Religion
- Traditional tribal religion, Christianity (Roman Catholic)

Related ethnic groups
- other Kumeyaay tribes, Cocopa, Quechan, Paipai, and Kiliwa

The Iipay Nation of Santa Ysabel (Kumiai: Pehaa Kwahkwaq; also known as the Santa Ysabel Band of Diegueño Mission Indians of the Santa Ysabel Reservation) is a federally recognized tribe of Kumeyaay people in San Diego County, California.

== Reservation ==
Location of Santa Ysabel Reservation

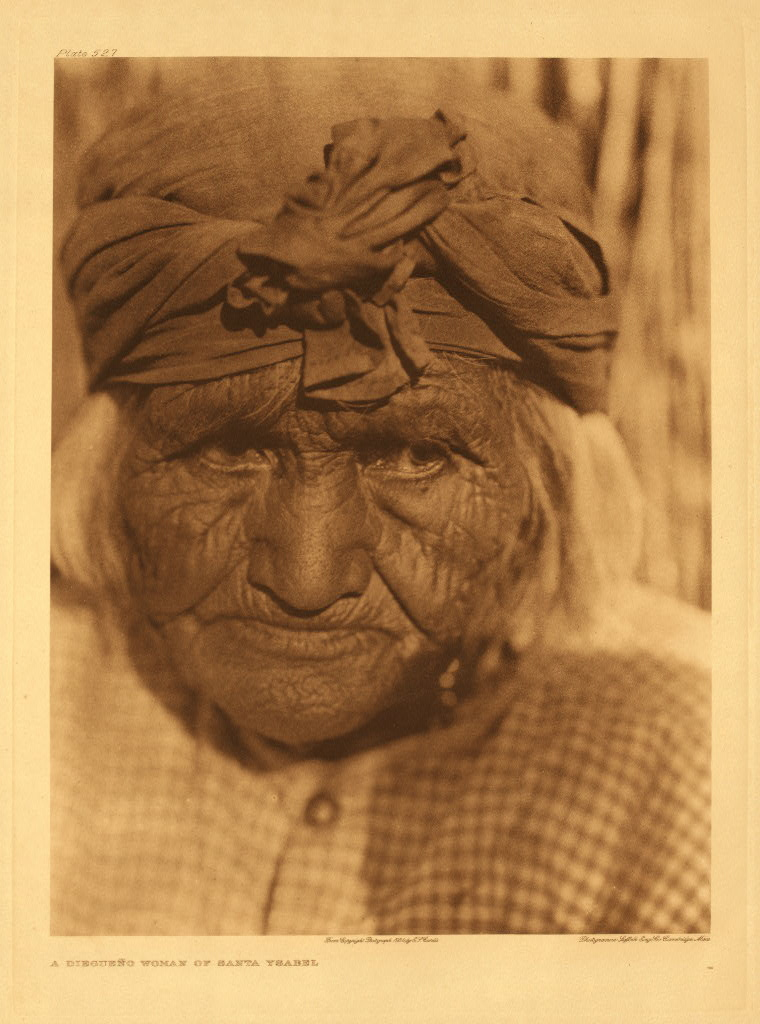
Santa Ysabel woman, photographed by Edward Curtis, 1926

The Santa Ysabel Reservation (Kumiai: 'Ellykwanan; 33°10′16″N 116°39′44″W) is a federal reservation, located in northeastern San Diego County, California, near the mountain towns of Santa Ysabel and Julian. The reservation was founded in 1893 and is 15,526.78 acres (62.8346 km^{2}) large. 110 people of 300 enrolled members lived there in the 1970s. The Santa Ysabel Indian Reservation ranges from 3,200 feet to 5,700 feet in elevation and it comprises a land base of over 15,000 acres on three tracts of land. The mountainous topography of the Reservation is home to a wide variety of indigenous plants and trees, including seven different species of oak trees, musky sage plants, verdant wild ferns, vibrantly blue lilacs, and waves of golden poppies that flourish along the hillsides and ridges of Volcan Mountain. The Santa Ysabel Reservation enjoys four beautiful seasons every year, with blossoming springs, warm summers, colorful and breezy autumns, and snow in most winters.

=== Demographics ===
Santa Ysabel Reservation, California – Racial and ethnic composition Note: the US Census treats Hispanic/Latino as an ethnic category. This table excludes Latinos from the racial categories and assigns them to a separate category. Hispanics/Latinos may be of any race.
Race / Ethnicity (NH = Non-Hispanic)	Pop 2000	Pop 2010	Pop 2020	% 2000	% 2010	% 2020
White alone (NH)	20	30	19	8.00%	9.09%	7.22%
Black or African American alone (NH)	0	0	3	0.00%	0.00%	1.14%
Native American or Alaska Native alone (NH)	206	267	222	82.40%	80.91%	84.41%
Asian alone (NH)	0	0	0	0.00%	0.00%	0.00%
Native Hawaiian or Pacific Islander alone (NH)	0	0	0	0.00%	0.00%	0.00%
Other race alone (NH)	0	0	0	0.00%	0.00%	0.00%
Mixed race or Multiracial (NH)	1	9	0	0.40%	2.73%	0.00%
Hispanic or Latino (any race)	23	24	19	9.20%	7.27%	7.22%
Total	250	330	263	100.00%	100.00%	100.00%

== Government ==
The Iipay Nation of Santa Ysabel is recognized by the United States Government as a Sovereign Government. The Santa Ysabel Band is headquartered in Santa Ysabel, California. They are governed by a democratically elected tribal council. Kevin Osuna is their current tribal chairperson and Chris Cleland is the vice chairman. In 2007 the Iipay Nation of Santa Ysabel established their Constitution in order to preserve and protect their culture, lands, and rights, and to promote equality and justice. The power of government is divided into four branches: General Council, Legislative, Executive, and Judicial. The General Council is the Supreme governing body of the Nation, and consists of over 700 adult voting members. The Executive Branch is composed of a Chairman and Vice-Chairman; The Chairman and Vice-Chairman seek office as a team, and serve four year terms. The Legislative Branch consists of seven Legislators; Legislators serve two and four year staggered terms.

== Economic development ==
The tribe owned and operated the Santa Ysabel Resort and Casino and the Orchard Restaurant and the Seven Oaks Bar and Grill, located in Santa Ysabel until they went out of business on February 3, 2014 after being denied chapter 11 bankruptcy. They established Santa Ysabel Interactive and launched the I-gaming poker website Private Table (privatetable.com) to offer Class II gaming to customers through Internet servers located on tribal lands. In offering online gaming through Santa Ysabel Interactive, the Tribe is exerting its sovereign right under the Indian Gaming Regulatory Act (IGRA) to regulate and conduct Class II gaming from the tribe's reservation. In 2007, the Iipay Nation of Santa Ysabel established the Santa Ysabel Tribal Development Corporation. In 2017, the corporation launched a high-level cannabis operation, which includes Mountain Source Dispensary and SoCal First Nations Distribution. Additionally, the Nation formed a Section 17 corporation, the Santa Ysabel Economic Development Corporation, which oversees several tribal lending enterprises and Santa Ysabel Roadside, a convenience store, and gas station. Currently, these corporations are managed by three board members: Melissa Barnet (Chairwoman), Tyler Vargas (Vice Chairman), and James Bucaro (Treasurer).

== Activities ==
In mid-November every year, the tribe celebrates a Feast Day at Santa Ysabel Asistencia.
