= Rancho Valle de San Jose (Portilla) =

Mexican land grant in California

Coordinates: 33.240°N 116.690°W

Rancho Valle de San Jose was a 17,634-acre (71.36 km^{2}) Mexican land grant in present day San Diego County, California, given in 1836 by Governor Nicolás Gutiérrez to Silvestre de la Portilla. Located in north east of San Diego County, it was bounded on the north by Buena Vista Creek and Rancho San Jose del Valle. The western part of the grant is under the waters of Lake Henshaw formed in 1922 by a dam on the San Luis Rey River.

== History ==
During the process of secularizing the Mission San Luis Rey in 1834, Captain Pablo de la Portillà was appointed administrator. In 1836, his brother, Silvestre de la Portillo (1801–), was granted the four square league Rancho Valle de San Jose, a portion of the valley formerly occupied by the Mission San Luis Rey, by Governor ad interim, Nicolás Gutiérrez. Silvestre de la Portillo left the rancho in charge of his brother, Pablo, and returned to his native Sonora and did not come back until the 1850s.

With the cession of California to the United States following the Mexican–American War, the 1848 Treaty of Guadalupe Hidalgo provided that the land grants would be honored. As required by the Land Act of 1851, a claim for Rancho Valle de San Jose was filed with the Public Land Commission in 1852, and the grant was patented to Silvestre de la Portilla in 1880.

In 1858, Silvestre de la Portilla sold Rancho Valle de San Jose to Vicenta Sepulveda de Carrillo. Silvestre de la Portillo married Claudia Valdez in 1860 at Mission San Luis Rey. Maria Vicenta Sepulveda (1816–1907) was married to Tomas Antonio Yorba (1787–1845) and then married to Jose Ramon Carrillo (1821–1864). Vicenta also received the Rancho La Sierra grant in 1846. Vicenta remained on Rancho Valle de San Jose until 1869, at which time she moved her family to Anaheim.

By about 1875, Louis Phillips and John G. Downey (1827–1894) owned most of the southern four square league Portilla Rancho Valle de San Jose and the northern six square league Warner Rancho San Jose del Valle. In 1880 Downey became sole owner.

The rights of the Native American Cupeño Indians to reoccupy their ancestral homeland became a controversial matter. In 1901, the US Supreme Court concurred with the finding of the lower courts that a U.S. Government patent of ownership conferred absolute ownership, and they were ordered ejected.

== See also ==
- Ranchos of California
- List of Ranchos of California
