= Halyikwamai =

Native American tribe

- Ethnicity: Cocopah
- Location: San Luis Río Colorado region
- Language: Cocopah

The Halyikwamai were a Native American tribe who lived along the Colorado River in the Lower Colorado River Valley between the 16th and 19th centuries in what is modern day region around San Luis Río Colorado, Sonora and San Luis, Arizona. The tribe spoke an extinct variation of the Cocopah language. The tribe was incorporated into the Maricopa in the middle of the 19th century.

== History ==
The Halyikwamai first made contact with Europeans in 1540, during Hernando de Alarcón's expedition to the Colorado River delta. They were later encountered by Juan de Onate in 1605, who located them between the Cocopa and Gila River confluence in six rancherías. They were documented in the same place by Eusebio Kino in 1701 and 1702, and Francisco Garcés in 1775-1776.

At the time of Spanish mediation between the Quechan and the 'Opa' and 'Cocomaricopa' Maricopa tribes on the Gila River in the early 1770s, the Halyikwamai were engaged in armed conflict aligned with the Maricopa. The Halykwamai were aligned with the Maricopa, along with the Akimel O'odham, Tohono Oʼodham, Cocopah, Paipai, Halchidoma, Cahuilla, Kohuana, Hualapai, and eastern Havasupai tribes against the Quechan, Mojave, Yavapai, Kumeyaay, Chemehuevi, and other small groups along the Colorado River. According to Francisco Garcés, the Halyikwamai had a population of about 2,000 in 1776.

The Halyikwamai were once again caught in conflict during the Second Yuma War in 1853, where they joined the Cocopah and Paipai and mobilized against the Quechan at Fort Yuma and the Mojave across the US-Mexican border. Following the war, the Halyikwamai were absorbed into the Maricopa.

== Culture ==
Little is known about the Halyikwamai, although it is suspected that their culture was similar to other tribes in the Gila River region. The Halyikwamai were agricultural. Kino described their land as "a veritable champaign of most fertile lands of most beautiful cornfields very well cultivated with abundant crops of maize, beans, and pumpkins." Kino also observed that they dried pumpkins and stored them. Alarcón described their chief as wearing "a garment closed in the front and back and open at the sides, fastened with buttons worked in a checkered black and white," and noted that the craftsmanship what "very fine and well made."
