= Rancho Santa Ysabel (Ortega) =

Mexican land grant in California

Coordinates: 33.140°N 116.670°W

Rancho Santa Ysabel was a 17,719-acre (71.71 km^{2}) Mexican land grant in present-day San Diego County, California, given in 1844 by Governor Manuel Micheltorena to José Joaquín Ortega and Edward Stokes after the Mexican secularization act of 1833. The grant was located in the Santa Ysabel Valley at the northern Cuyamaca Mountains, and encompassed present-day Santa Ysabel.

== History ==
The four square league former Mission San Diego de Alcalá lands in the Santa Ysabel Valley had the 1818 Santa Ysabel Asistencia (sub-mission) on them. They were granted in 1844 to José Joaquin Ortega and his son-in-law, Edward Stokes. Stokes and his father-in-law Ortega received two Mexican land grants - Rancho Valle de Pamo in the Santa María Valley in 1843 and Rancho Santa Ysabel in 1844.

José Joaquin Geronimo Ortega (1801–1865), grandson of José Francisco Ortega, married Maria Casimira Pico (1804–1883), sister of Pío Pico and Andrés Pico, in 1821. José Joaquin Ortega served as majordomo and administrator of San Diego Mission from 1835 to 1840, and as majordomo of Mission San Luis Rey de Francia during the years 1843-45. Based on this experience, he knew the best of the ex-mission lands when seeking grants. He also served as justice, elector, alternate member of the assembly, alcalde, and county supervisor.

In 1840, English sailor Edward Stokes came to California from Hawaii. In 1842 he married Maria del Refugio Ortega (1823–1918), daughter of José Joaquin Ortega. Stokes died soon after the Battle of San Pasqual. His widow Maria Ortega married in 1859 Agustin Olvera, grantee of the Rancho Cuyamaca.

With the cession of California to the United States following the Mexican-American War, the 1848 Treaty of Guadalupe Hidalgo provided that the land grants would be honored. As required by the Land Act of 1851, a claim for Rancho Santa Ysabel was filed with the Public Land Commission in 1852, and the grant was patented to José Joaquín Ortega and Eduardo Stokes in 1872.

In 1852, Ortega and Maria Stokes sold Rancho Santa Ysabel. In 1869 Alfred H. Wilcox (1823–1883) and Benjamin M. Hartshorne (1826–1900), one of his business partners in their successful Colorado River steamboat firm George A. Johnson & Company, acquired Rancho Santa Ysabel. Wilcox with his wife Maria Antonia Argüello (1835–1909), also owned Rancho La Punta after his marriage to her in 1863.

The Moretti-Cauzza family acquired the ranch in 1898 and ranched there for four generations. The family sold off the ranch. The Nature Conservancy purchased two parts of the ranch which are now operated by San Diego County Parks.

== See also ==
- Ranchos of California
- List of Ranchos of California
