= Rancho Valle de Pamo =

Mexican land grant in California

Coordinates: 33.040°N 116.880°W

Rancho Valle de Pamo (also called Rancho Santa María) was a 17,709-acre (71.67 km^{2}) Mexican land grant in present-day San Diego County, California, given in 1843 by Governor Manuel Micheltorena to José Joaquín Ortega and Edward Stokes. The grant occupied Santa Maria Valley and was centered on present-day Ramona.

== History ==
The four square league former San Diego Mission lands in the Santa Maria Valley were granted to José Joaquin Ortega and his son-in-law, Edward Stokes. Stokes and his father-in-law Ortega received two Mexican land grants - Rancho Valle de Pamo in the Santa María Valley in 1843, and Rancho Santa Ysabel in the Santa Ysabel Valley in 1844.

José Joaquin Geronimo Ortega (1801–1865), grandson of José Francisco Ortega, married Maria Casimira Pico (1804–1883), sister of Pío Pico and Andrés Pico, in 1821. José Joaquin Ortega served as majordomo and administrator of San Diego Mission from 1835 to 1840, and as majordomo of San Luis Rey Mission from 1843 to 1845. From this experience, he knew which were the best of the ex-mission lands when seeking grants. He also served as justice, elector, alternate member of the assembly, alcalde, and county supervisor.

Edward Stokes was an English sailor who came to California from Hawaii. In 1842 he married Maria del Refugio Ortega (1823–1918), daughter of José Joaquin Ortega. Stokes died soon after the Battle of San Pasqual. His widow Maria Ortega married in 1859 Agustin Olvera, grantee of the Rancho Cuyamaca.

With the cession of California to the United States following the Mexican–American War, the 1848 Treaty of Guadalupe Hidalgo provided that the land grants would be honored. As required by the Land Act of 1851, a claim for Rancho Valle de Pamo was filed with the Public Land Commission in 1852, and the grant was patented to José Joaquín Ortega and Eduardo Stokes in 1872.

In 1852, José Joaquin Ortega and María del Refugio Stokes sold the rancho to Susan McKinstry, but by 1856 had re-acquired the property, and José Joaquin Ortega mortgaged his half share of the property to William C. Ferrell. Edward Stokes and María del Refugio Ortega had had three sons, Alfredo (b. 1840), Adolfo (b. 1843), and Eduardo (b. 1846). By 1870, Adolfo Stokes became the sole owner, and in 1872, sold the property to Juan B. Arrambide. In 1878 Arrambide sold the rancho to Bernard Etcheverry (1836–1912). Etcheverry had emigrated from France in 1856 to seek his fortune in the California gold mines. After a few years, Etcheverry moved back to his native France, but then returned to San Diego County in 1872.

In 1886, Etcheverry sold 3,855 acres (15.6 km^{2}) to Milton Santee, a Los Angeles civil engineer and land developer. Santee then started the Santa Maria Land and Water Company and subdivided what is now the townsite of Ramona.

== See also ==
- Ranchos of California
- List of Ranchos of California
