= Oak Grove Butterfield Stage Station =

Overland Mail stagecoach stop in California

- U.S. National Register of Historic Places
- U.S. National Historic Landmark
- California Historical Landmark
- California Historical Landmark
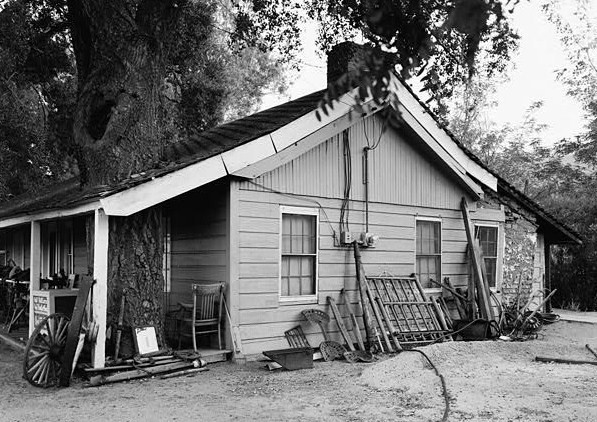
- Oak Grove Butterfield Stage Station

- Location within San Diego County, California Location within California Location within the United States
- Location: Warner Springs area, San Diego County, California
- Coordinates: 33°23′23.02″N 116°47′38.75″W
- Built: 1858
- NRHP reference No.: 66000222
- CHISL No.: 482
- CHISL No.: 502

Significant dates
- Added to NRHP: October 15, 1966
- Designated NHL: November 5, 1961

Oak Grove Butterfield Stage Station is a stage station in the western foothills of the Laguna Mountains, in northern San Diego County, California. It is located on State Route 79, 13 miles (21 km) northwest of Warner Springs and Warner's Ranch. The station was built on the site of Camp Wright, an 1860s Civil War outpost.

== Camp Wright ==
During the American Civil War, Camp Wright was a Union Army outpost in the Pacific coast theater of the American Civil War. It was established to protect the route to Fort Yuma on the Colorado River, and intercept secessionist sympathizers traveling to the east to join the Confederate Army. A detachment of California Volunteer cavalry and infantry first established Camp Wright at Warner's Ranch near Warner Springs, in October 1861. The cold and windy conditions in the higher altitude of the exposed San Jose Valley caused the commander to change its site to the more sheltered Oak Grove location in November.

At about the same time, the Dan Showalter party of secessionists were attempting to avoid the post and make their way across the desert to join the Confederate Army in Texas. They were pursued from Temecula by a 1st Regiment California Volunteer Cavalry patrol from Camp Wright, intercepted in the hills west of the San Jose Valley (site of Warner's Ranch) with the support of a 1st California Infantry detachment from the camp, and captured without shots being fired November 20–29, 1861. After being imprisoned at Fort Yuma, Showalter and the others were released upon swearing loyalty to the Union. They later made their way to the Confederacy.

For a short time in March 1862 Camp Wright was the headquarters of the 5th Regiment California Volunteer Infantry before it moved on. Used for the rest of the war as a transit camp for troops moving along the road to and from New Mexico Territory and Arizona Territory, the camp was abandoned in 1866.

The Oak Grove Butterfield Stage Station, in operation between 1858 and 1860, is one of few surviving stations of the Butterfield Overland Mail stagecoach line across the Western United States. The adobe building the stagecoach station used was built in 1858, and on the former site of Camp Wright (1861–1862). It was a stop between Los Angeles and Fort Yuma on the San Francisco to St. Louis route. It is a well-preserved one-story adobe building among California oak woodlands.

== Historic Landmarks ==
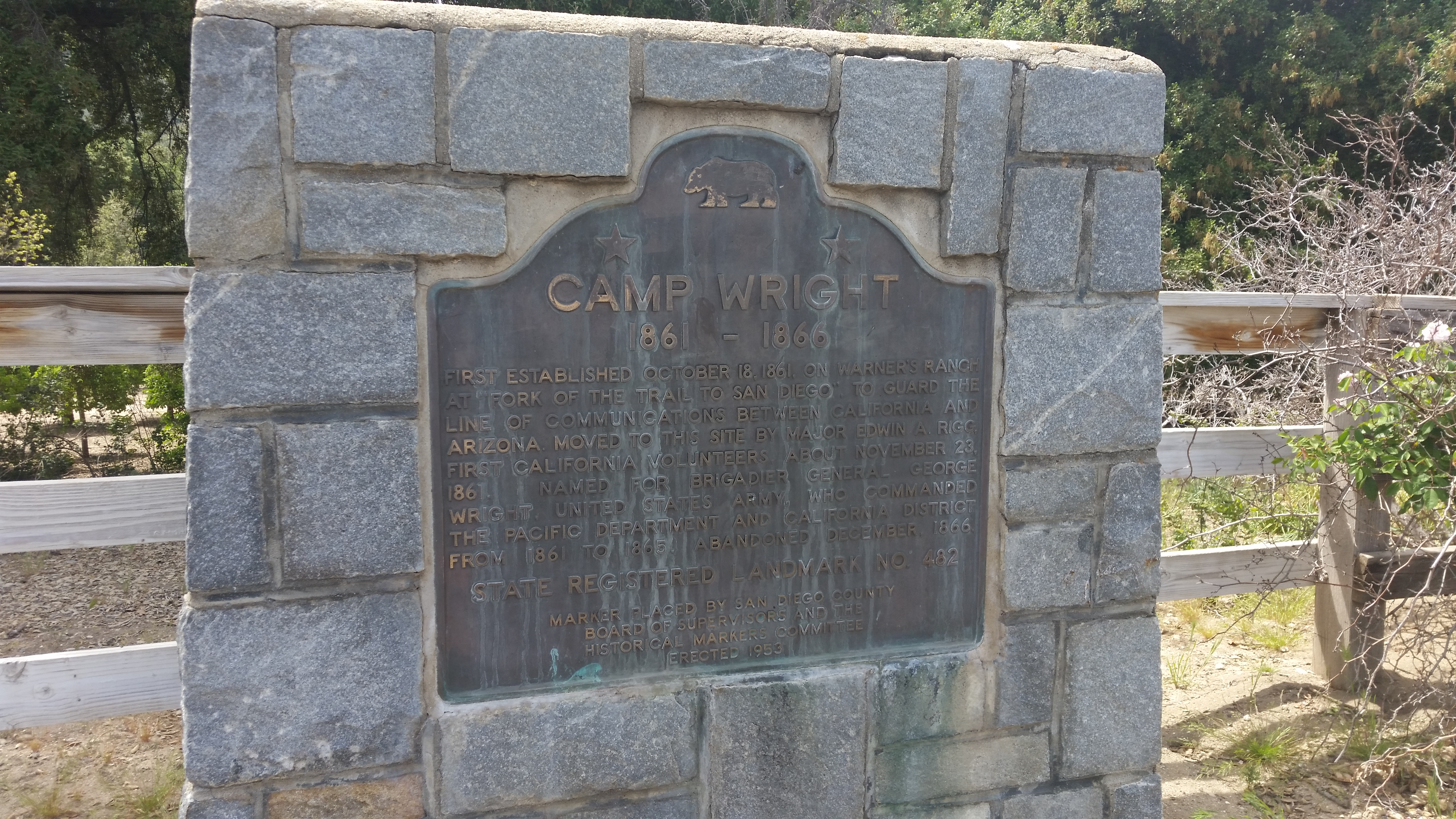
Camp Wright plaque

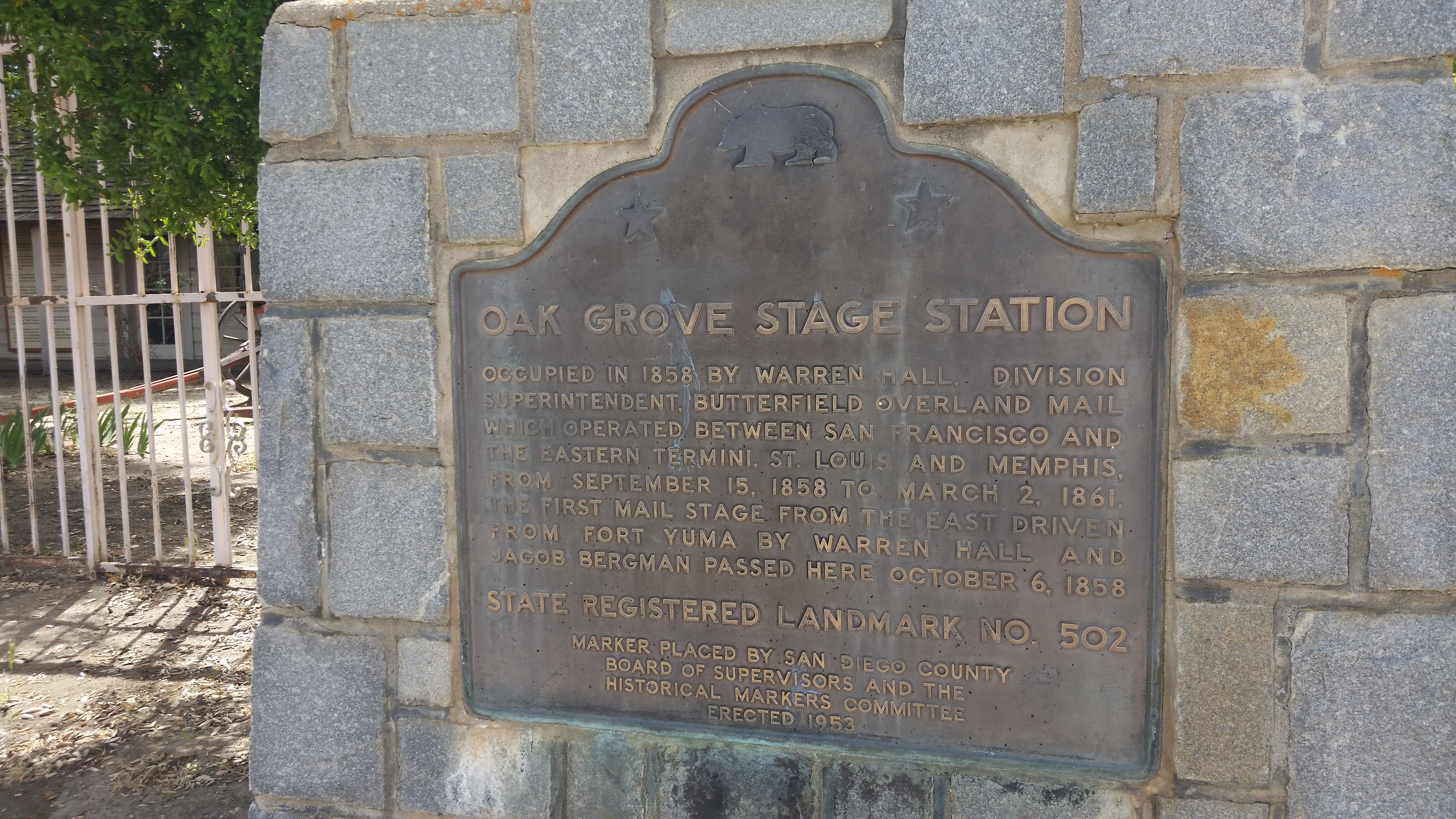
Oak Grove plaque

The site of Camp Wright was registered as a California Historical Landmark in 1950.

The Oak Grove Butterfield Stage Station on its site was registered as a separate California Historical Landmark in 1952. The Oak Grove station was declared a National Historic Landmark in 1961. The location of another nearby station at Warner's Ranch is also a National Historic Landmark.

== See also ==
- Butterfield Overland Mail in California
- Pony Express
- San Antonio–San Diego Mail Line
