= Juan José Warner =

American-Mexican rancher and politician

Juan Jose Warner
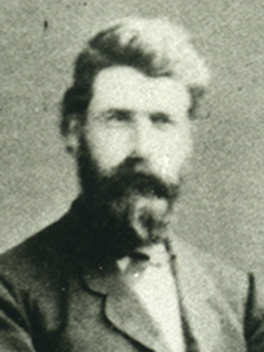
- Warner in 1875
- Born: Jonathan Trumbull Warner; 1807; Connecticut, U.S.
- Died: 1890 (aged 82–83); Los Angeles, California, U.S.
- Occupations: Rancher, politician

Juan José Warner (1807–1890), a naturalized American-Mexican citizen, developed Warner's Ranch in Warner Springs, California. From 1849 to 1861, the ranch was important as a stop for emigrant travelers on the Southern Emigrant Trail, including the Gila River Emigrant Trail and the Butterfield Overland Mail stagecoach line. Warner established the only trading post between New Mexico and Los Angeles. Warner's Ranch was designated a National Historic Landmark.

== Early life ==
Warner was born in 1807 as Jonathan Trumbull Warner in Connecticut. He went west, travelling with a trading party from St. Louis in 1830, bound for Santa Fe. The following year he traveled with fur trappers to California. In 1907, the Annual Publication of the Historical Society of Southern California published Colonel J. J. Warner's account of his California trapping days in "Reminiscences of Early California – 1831 to 1846".

== Career ==
In California Warner first trapped beaver for several years. From 1834 to 1841 he worked in a merchandising store in Los Angeles. As Mexico had controlled California since Mexican independence in 1821, Warner became a naturalized Mexican citizen and changed his name to Juan José Warner. About 1843, he moved to San Diego.

In 1844, Warner was granted the Rancho San Jose del Valle Mexican land grant, previously granted to José Antonio Pico and abandoned. He established what became known as Warner's Ranch near Warner Springs, California. The ranch property included hot springs. After he started serving travelers in 1849 on the Southern Trail, Warner set up the only trading post between New Mexico and Los Angeles.

Warner's ranch was a historic territory of the Cupeño Indians, who had inhabited the area for centuries before Spanish missionaries entered the area. Their land was taken over, many of the Cupeños worked for Warner on the ranch and constructed a village nearby.

After California became part of the United States, taxes were imposed on the Cupeño, one of a series of issues that led in 1851 to the Garra Uprising. In the revolt, several of the Warner ranch buildings were burned down. Warner moved his family to Los Angeles but continued to manage the ranch for years. The ranch was used as a stop on the Butterfield Overland Mail stagecoach line, which operated from 1857 to 1861.

Warner lost the ranch when his grant was challenged by a previous claimant. He was active in California politics in Los Angeles.

== Death and legacy ==
Warner died in 1890.

The Cupeño gained no legal remedy to their issues but remained settled around the hot springs, to which they charged some travelers admission. In 1880 the ranch was purchased by John G. Downey, a former governor of the state. In 1892 Downey tried to evict the Cupeño from the property. They filed suit against him, but lost in federal court in 1901 and were forced to relocate in 1903 to the Warner Ranch Indian Reservation located in Pala Valley about 20 miles away.
