= Gila Expedition =

1850 California militia attack in the Yuma War

The Gila Expedition or Morehead War was an 1850 California militia attack on the Quechan, in retaliation for the Glanton Massacre, which had taken place near the confluence of the Gila River and Colorado River in Arizona. It was the beginning of the 1850 to 1853 Yuma War.

Downriver from a ferry owned by A.L. Lincoln, the Quechan set up a ferry business to transport people, beasts and goods across the Colorado River on their way to the California Gold Rush. John Joel Glanton and his scalp-hunting gang destroyed the Quechan boat and beat the local Quechan chief. For a while they took over Lincoln's ferry operation, killing Mexican and American passengers for their goods and money. In revenge, the Quechan attacked, killed and scalped Glanton and most of the gang in 1850.

Later that year, the California state government recruited men for $6 a day to attack the Quechan. It was California's first military operation against indigenous Americans. On April 16, 1850, 142 men commenced the expedition against the Quechan. However, the military operation went badly, and the expedition members were besieged until September 16.

Because of the inflated costs of goods and wages during the Gold Rush, the cost of the operation reached $113,000 and nearly bankrupted the state.

== See also ==
- Military history of the United States
