= Yuma War =

Armed conflict fought primarily between the United States and the Yuma people

- Part of the American Indian Wars
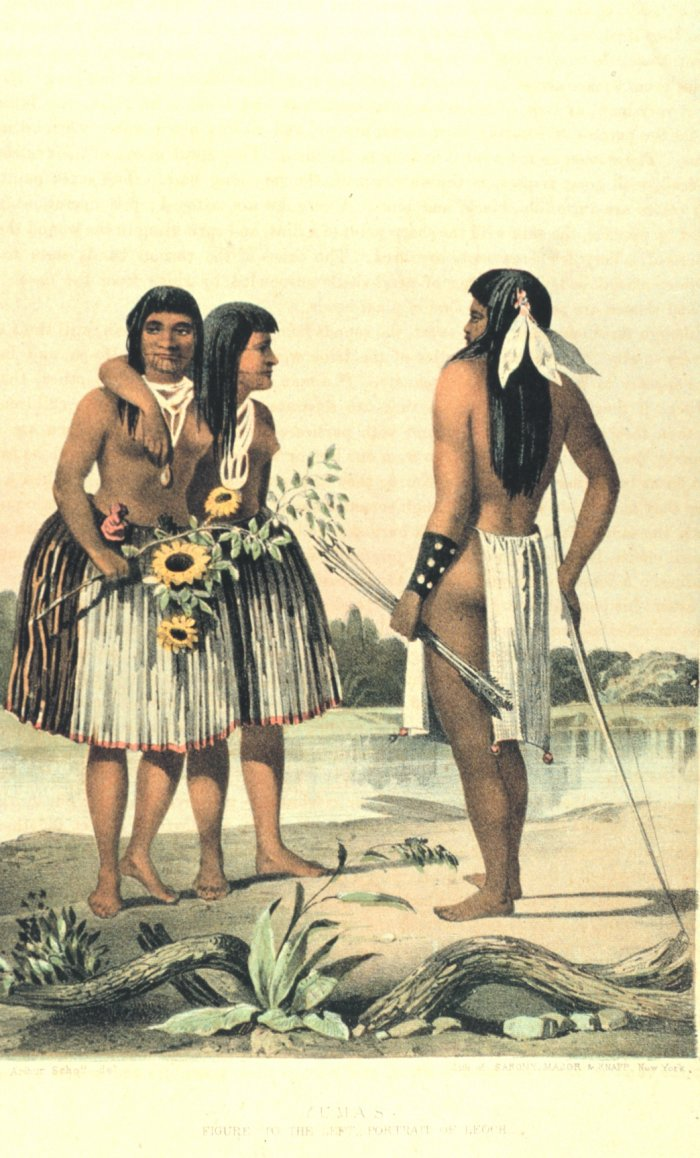
- Yumans along the Colorado River by William Emory, circa 1857.
Date	1850–1853
Location	Sonora, Arizona, California
Result	United States victory

Belligerents
1st Yuma War: Colorado River Valley Theatre; United States; San Diego Theatre; United States; Cahuilla Mountain Band; San Pasqual Kumeyaay 2nd Yuma War; Cocopah; Paipai; Halyikwamai	1st Yuma War: Colorado River Valley Theatre; Yuma; Mohave; Cocopah; San Diego Theatre; Cahuilla Los Coyotes Band; Cupeño; Mountain Kumeyaay 2nd Yuma War; Yuma; Mohave

Commanders and leaders
(United States) Samuel P. Heintzelman (United States) George Stoneman (United States) Delozier Davidson (United States) Edward H. Fitzgerald (United States) Frederick Steele; Juan Antonio (Cahuilla); Jose Pedro Panto (Kumeyaay)	Huttami; Cavallo y Pelo; Santiago; Vicente; Macedon; Jose Maria; Irataba Antonio Garra (Cupeño) †; Chipule †; Cecili †

Strength
First Yuma War: US Army: ~120-180; California Militia: 142; Cahuilla Mtn Band: ~100 Second Yuma War: Cocopah, Paipai, and Halyikwamai: ~200-400	First Yuma War: Quechan: ~200–400; Cocopah: ~100-150; Cupeno and Kumeyaay: ~100; Mohave: +200 Second Yuma War: Quechan: ~250; Mohave: +100

Casualties and losses
First Yuma War: US: 74 Second Yuma War: Cocopah: 14 (7 civilians)	First Yuma War: Quechan: 11 (1 child); Cahuilla: 10; Cupeño: 1 Second Yuma War: Quechan: 41 (33 civilians)

The Yuma War was the name given to a series of United States military operations conducted in Southern California and what is today southwestern Arizona from 1850 to 1853. The Quechan (also known as Yuma) were the primary opponent of the United States Army, though engagements were fought between the Americans and other native groups in the region.

== Background ==
After the Mexican Cession, American settlers headed west over the Colorado River to take part in the California gold rush, many of whom crossed over Quechan lands. Seeing the opportunity, the Quechans established a ferry business near the junction of the Gila and the Colorado Rivers to transport American settlers on their way to California, drawing ire from white American ferry businesses operating on the Colorado River.

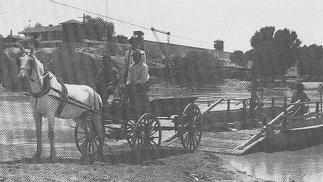
Yuma Ferry

== First Yuma War ==
=== Glanton Massacre ===
In early 1850, California outlaw John Joel Glanton and his gang of twelve men partnered with Jaeger's Ferry by sabotaging Quechan ferry operations and destroying their ferry. They then robbed and murdered both Americans, Mexicans, and natives as they traveled around and across the river. The Glanton gang also mugged the local Quechan chief and harassed the local Quechan.

In response, a Quechan war party retaliated by attacking Glanton's gang, killing nine. This act sparked the beginning of the Yuma War as news of the retaliation spread to California, provoking US military action.

=== Gila Expedition ===
California responded with the Gila Expedition, raising a militia of 142 men who were paid $6 a day to fight the Yuma as opposed to panning gold. Setting off on April 16, the Gila Expedition entered what is today Arizona only to be besieged and defeated in September after a series of skirmishes. The expedition was a failure and due to the inflated prices caused by the gold rush, cost the State of California 113,000 dollars, a sum which nearly bankrupted the state.

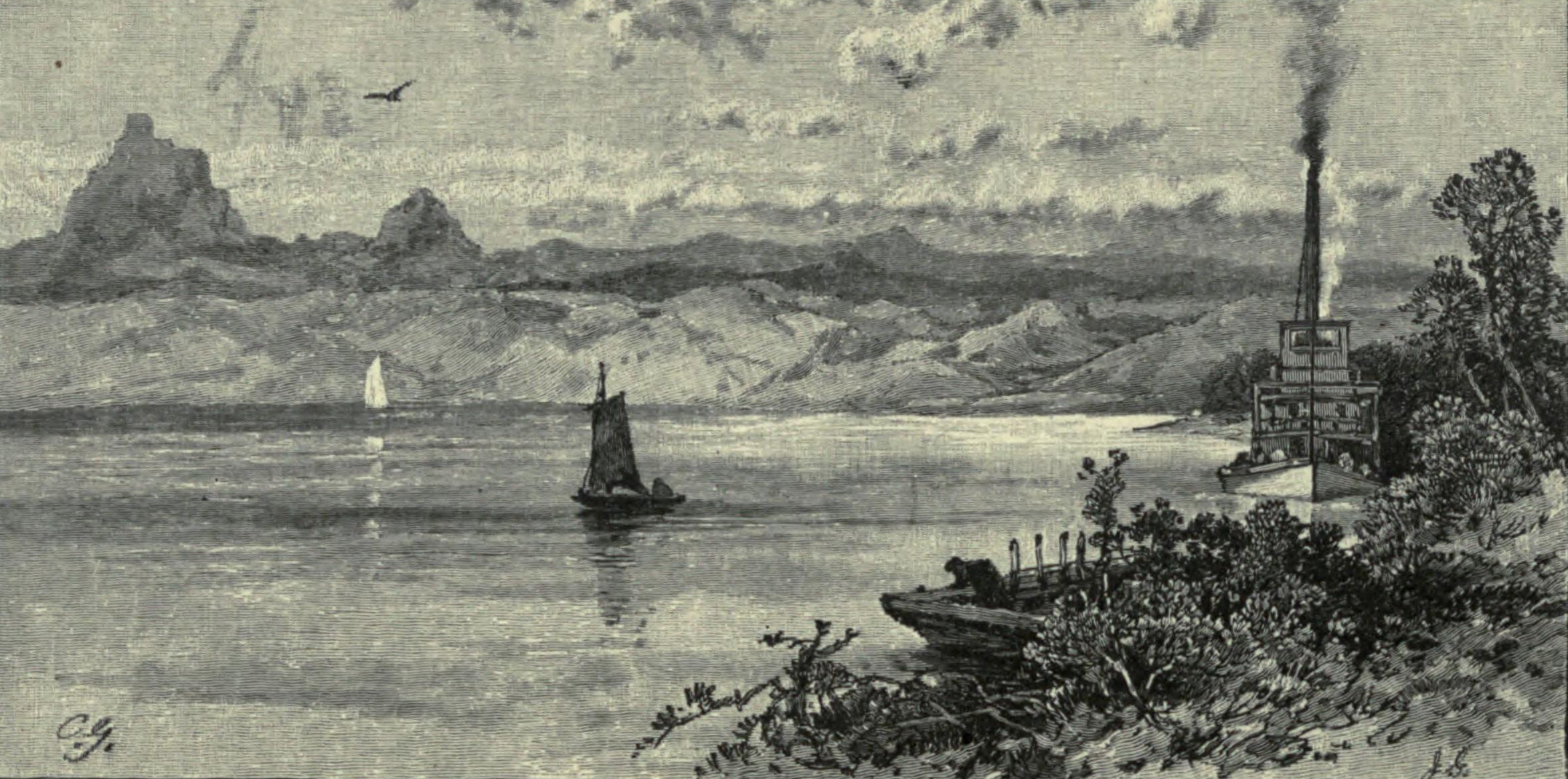
Colorado River at Yuma

=== Yuma Expedition ===
Following the failure of the California Militia against the Quechan people (Yuma Indians), in the Gila Expedition, the U. S. Army sent the Yuma Expedition under Captain Samuel P. Heintzelman, to establish a post at Yuma Crossing of the Colorado River in the vicinity where it met the Gila River in the Lower Colorado River Valley region of California. He was to protect travelers on the overland route from the east to California and to quell any hostilities by the Quechan people (Yuma Indians).

After reconnoitering his route, Heintzelman marched out of San Diego on 3 October 1850 with three companies of the 2nd Infantry Regiment with another infantry company establishing a depot at Vallecitos. He then sent a small party in advance digging wells in the desert between Vallecitos and the Colorado River. He reached Vallecitos on November 3 and the Yuma Crossing on November 27, a third company arriving a few days later. Camp Yuma was established with the tents protected from sun and wind by brush and reed fences and arbors. A garden and vineyard were started near the river. The Quechan living in the vicinity of the camp were quiet and friendly.

In February 1851, Heintzelman again met with some Quechan leaders along the Colorado. Presenting them with tobacco, food and other gifts, the Quechan were very pleased and expressed their fear of the Maricopa who lived along the Gila River and were raiding Quechan villages. Heintzelman attempted to secure a peace between the Quechan and Maricopa.

Supply difficulties began when supply wagons arrived late and did not carry enough to supply the troops for long. Supply by sea from San Diego had been requested but did not arrive as planned. When it did arrive boats had difficulty bringing it up from the mouth of the Colorado against the river's difficult current and course. Bringing it overland by wagon was difficult also but more successful even though it was technically a brief invasion of Sonora, Mexico.

Heintzelman requested a steamboat be sent to carry supplies up river but supplies ran dangerously low. Additionally the crops of the local Quechan had failed and were asking for food from the camp and Heintzelman was ordered in June 1851 to evacuate the camp leaving only a small detachment of ten men under Lieutenant Sweeny to guard the ferry.

=== Siege of Fort Yuma ===
During the construction of the camp, there was no fighting between the Quechan and the American army due to the peace Heintzelman had settled, but peace did not last long.

In October 1851, a letter arrived at San Diego from Lieutenant Sweeny. It asked that Heintzelman immediately send aid to the fort. Provisions were low, scurvy had broken out and dozens of Quechan warriors had surrounded the post. Sweeny expected an attack but Heintzelman's only response was a letter of his own stating that there was no reason to believe the Yuma were hostile. But when news arrived that four of Sweeny's command had been killed by around 800 Quechan, Cocopah, & Mohave, Heintzelman sent sixteen men under Captain Delozier Davidson with a train of mules and wagons. The squad arrived at the fort on December 6 but abandoned it soon after for a new camp six miles to the south near Pilot Knob.

=== Garra's Revolt and the San Diego Tax Revolt of 1851 ===
In 1851, San Diego County unilaterally imposed property taxes on Native American tribes in the county and threatened to confiscate land and property should they fail to pay up the $600 tax. These new obligations for taxes were applied to the Cupeño and the Kumeyaay, who hardly dealt with US currency. The two tribes agreed to join the revolt along with the Cocopah and Quechan in the Yuma War, although the Kumeyaay made no military commitments to attack San Diego.

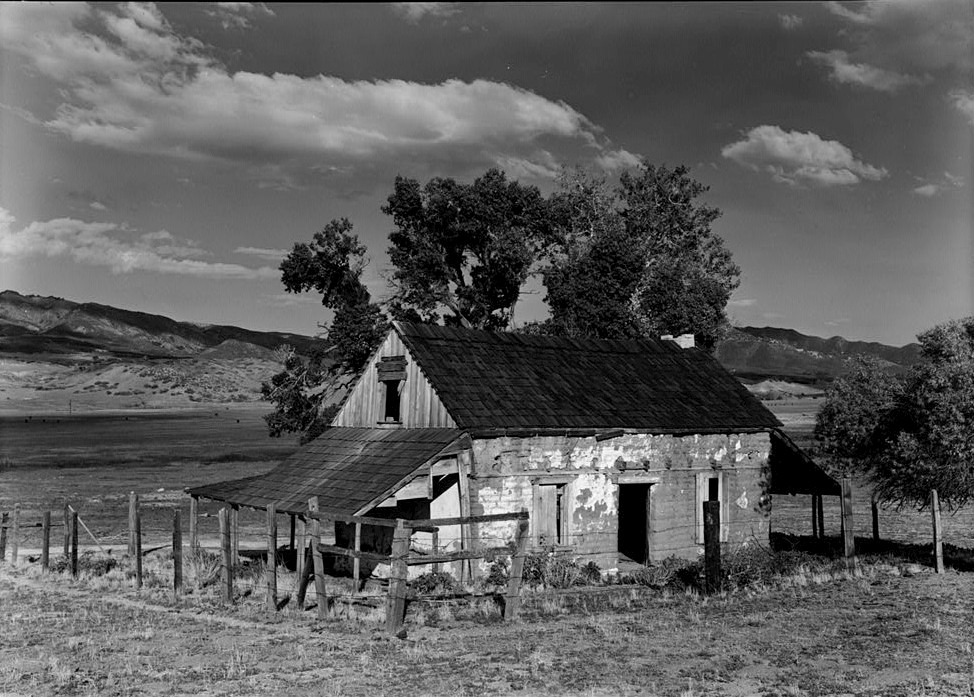
Warner's Ranch

At the beginning of the Garra Revolt, an uprising by the local Cupeño tribe under Antonio Garra, launched an attack on Warner's Ranch together with the Cahuilla and the nearby Kumeyaay, which had a negative reputation for severe treatment of Indians.

Heintzelman learned of a December 1851 Cahuilla and Cupeño raid on Warner's Ranch and Agua Caliente in the San Felipe Mountains. The Cupeño warrior Antonio Garra led what became known as the Garra Revolt. California's American population were very concerned at the possibility of warfare being waged so close to their settlements on the coast, in San Diego concerned citizens began preparing to defend the town in case the Cahuilla and Cupeño attacked there. The Kumeyaay at the San Pasqual Pueblo had earlier fought off a Quechan campaign bound for San Diego in the San Pasqual Valley. In response to the raids, Heintzelman started the Agua Caliente Expedition, a march to the San Felipe Mountains.

Just northeast of Agua Caliente, Heintzelman's column of five infantry companies and one artillery company encountered 100 Cahuilla, under Chief Chipule, at the Battle of Coyote Canyon, located within Borrego Valley. A battle was fought on the morning of December 21, 1851, ending with the loss of six warriors, including Chipule and Chief Cecili. The natives were armed mostly with bows and they were routed from the field. From Coyote Canyon, Heintzelman continued northeast, further into the mountains, where they found a rancheria containing items from Warner's Ranch. The rancheria and nearby village were abandoned but Heintzelman had them burned before continuing back to Agua Caliente.

After losing their villages, the Cahuilla chose to surrender to the Americans. Jonathan Warner was used as an interpreter in a court case to decide the fate of four Cahuilla chiefs who were found guilty of raiding Warner's Ranch, killing civilians there, burning the place and robbing it. Subsequently, the four, named Juan Baustista, Francisco Mecate, Quisil and Luis, were executed by firing squad and buried on December 25, 1851. Garra was captured at Razon's rancheria in the Coachella Valley, by the Mountain Cahuilla leader Juan Antonio and turned over to the volunteer company from Los Angeles. He was later tried and executed in San Diego, January 10, 1852.

Further relations between the Cahuilla and the Cupeño broke down in 1852 and the two tribes went to war.

=== Campaigns along the Colorado and Gila Rivers ===
==== Colorado River campaigns ====
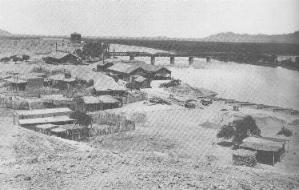
Yuma Crossing in 1886.

Heintzelman stayed in San Diego for a couple months to organize a second Yuma expedition to secure and reinforce Fort Yuma. The expedition sailed up the Colorado river in February 1852, but had to land at Ogden's Landing after one of the boats got swamped and had to reach Fort Yuma on land. Edward H. Fitzgerald would leave Fort Yuma to escort Heinzelman's men. Eighteen miles from Yuma, Fitzgerald's men were attacked by the Quechan for 18 hours, resulting in one American and four Quechan dead, forcing Fitzgerald to retreat to the fort.

Late in March 1853, the soldiers of Fort Yuma organized a second expedition of eighty infantry and cavalry under Captain Fitzgerald and Captain Davidson. It was not very successful, as the Quechan were warned of the advancing Americans and they retreated from their villages without a fight. Only twenty Quechan were spotted by the soldiers, and one old man was captured. Lieutenant Frederick Steele launched an operation just after, with forty men Steele proceeded up the western bank of the Colorado River and engaged in one skirmish. A small band of Quechan were found along the river and attacked as they fled across. Several Quechan were reportedly killed, though most escaped harm. Lieutenant Steele continued on, destroying a few Quechan fields before returning to the fort. American civilians passing by the fort informed the captain that a large party of Quechan was about forty miles north. Thirty men were sent to investigate, but they returned to Fort Yuma after traveling seventy miles north without encountering the enemy. In mid May, the garrison conducted several scouting operations in the vicinity around the fort. In one of these missions, Lieutenant Sweeny with twenty-five men attacked a village south of Fort Yuma. There they killed one warrior, accidentally wounded a woman and burned the village. Large amounts of clothing and food were also destroyed. Lieutenant Henry B. Hendershott led a third party into Quechan territory around the fort, destroying two villages, along with several wheat fields, and killing two warriors. During a fourth operation of the same type, First Lieutenant George Pearce and his men killed three warriors and wounded Chief Pasqual. One woman was also wounded and a child drowned in the Colorado.

==== Battle of the Gila River ====
In August, Ambrosio Armijo of New Mexico, with 9,000 head of sheep, was approaching the fort. He sent a message to Heintzelman stating that the natives had been harassing his train since he passed the Pima Villages and many of his livestock had been taken by the Pima and Maricopa. The Quechan, were now threatening the train, so immediately upon receiving the message, Heintzelman dispatched fourteen men under Lieutenant Sweeny for protection. Almost as soon as Sweeny crossed the Colorado, he sent a message back stating that he expected to be attacked by some 800 warriors and that one of Armijo's sheep herders had been killed. Heintzelman quickly moved his entire command across the river, fully expecting a major battle. According to reports, Apache, Mohave, and Maricopa made up part of the 800 man force. It was almost dark when the garrison left the fort. Heintzelman marched along the southern bank of the Gila all through the night and into the following morning without realizing he had passed Armijo's camp. When the captain concluded that he was going the wrong way, he sent a squad back down the Gila, but before they had gone a mile, they encountered 100 to 150 mounted Quechan and Cocopah warriors. The squad returned to Heintzelmen's column, which was solely infantry, so the captain attempted to outmaneuver the natives. He divided his force into two and sent one to flank the group of warriors. However, as soon as the flanking party started to move, the Quechan and Cocopah loosed a volley of rifle fire and a hail of arrows upon them. Flanking the natives had failed, so Heintzelman ordered all of his men to charge. However, before the Americans could get close enough, the natives scattered into the surrounding hills. Two Americans were wounded along with at least two natives.

=== Yuma Treaty ===
In October 1852, the Quechan surrendered to Heintzelman. A peace treaty with many of the participating war chiefs in the region was made between the Quechan tribes and the US.

== Second Yuma War ==
Second Yuma War
- Part of the American Indian Wars
Date	1853
Location	Arizona, California
Result	Ceasefire; US gains unrestricted right to build forts and roads on Mohave territory.

Belligerents
Cocopah; Paipai; Halyikwamai	Yuma; Mohave

Commanders and leaders
	Macedon †; Irataba; Kapetame; Asikahota; Tapaikuneche; Hatsurama

Casualties and losses
14 (7 civilians) dead	41 (33 civilians) dead

As result of the peace, the Cocopah cut their alliance with the Quechan and conflict broke out again in May 1853. First the Cocopah besieged three Quechan villages, killing Chief Macedon, four other warriors and ten women and children. Twelve prisoners were taken and a herd of Quechan horses captured. The Cocopah then massacred Chief Jose Maria's camp, killing three men and twenty-three women and children. Heintzelman noted that this massacre was an "unprovoked aggression on part of the Cocopah." A burial detail was formed and sent to the scene of the attack, within Mexican territory and present day Arizona. The bodies were burned according to native American tradition and then the detail returned to the fort. Days later, Chief Maria arrived at Fort Yuma and informed Heintzelman that the high Cocopah chief had released some Quechan women and children, but the majority were still in captivity. Maria also told the captain that the Cocopah were retreating into the mountains and that the Yuma were preparing their own raid in retaliation.

The Cocopah also formed an alliance with the Paipai and Halyikwamai. Together they outnumbered the Quechan warriors who gathered at Fort Yuma, which was now a center of trade with the Americans. Some warriors at the post alarmed the garrison, but the Quechan were not hostile. When about 250 men were assembled, they raided south into Cocopah territory, killing seven warriors and four women. Simultaneously, the Mohave under Chief Arateve raided Cocopah territory after the Yuma asked them to join in the war. The Mohave, by all accounts, did not want to fight, but because their Quechan friends feared for their safety, the Mohave came to their aid. In the raid, three Cocopah men were killed and two women were taken captive. According to the Mohave, years later the Cocopah women were captured to be married to Mohave men and by producing blended Cocopah and Mohave offspring, they would help to ensure peace between the two tribes.

When conflict with the Cocopah ceased the Americans at Fort Yuma received a new objective which was to prevent further bloodshed between the native tribes. Chief Arateve went to Fort Yuma where he asked the Americans to deliver a sort of contract to the four other Mohave war chiefs. The four braves were Kapetame, Asikahota, Tapaikuneche and Hatsurama. With Arateve they were known as the "Five Brave Men." All ranked equally and all received five letters from the American army, which, if accepted, stipulated that they would no longer attack other native tribes or American settlers, and they would not prevent the army from building forts and roads on their land. If the stipulations were not met the United States would go to war against the Mohave. With some convincing from Aratave, the four other chiefs eventually agreed to be peaceful and the Yuma War came to an end.

== Aftermath ==
Following the Gadsden Purchase in June 1853, the eastern side of the Colorado became part of the United States and though the war was over between the Quechan and the Americans, the United States Army could now launch major military campaigns across the river without having to concern themselves with the Mexican military. War between the United States and the Mohave became a reality in 1858 when warriors attacked American settlers at Beale's Crossing in Arizona. The attack resulted in the establishment of Fort Mohave and the war ended in 1859 after the Mohave were defeated twice in two significant engagements.

Later, the Quechan came into conflict with the Maricopa, and in 1857 the last major battle involving the Yuma was fought. In the Battle of Pima Butte in the Sierra Estrella Mountains, the Maricopa and Pima defeated and killed well over 100 Quechan and their allies, after which the Quechan were no longer a military power.

== See also ==
- Sitgreaves Expedition
