= Santa Ysabel Asistencia =

"Sub-mission" to Mission San Diego de Alcalá in California

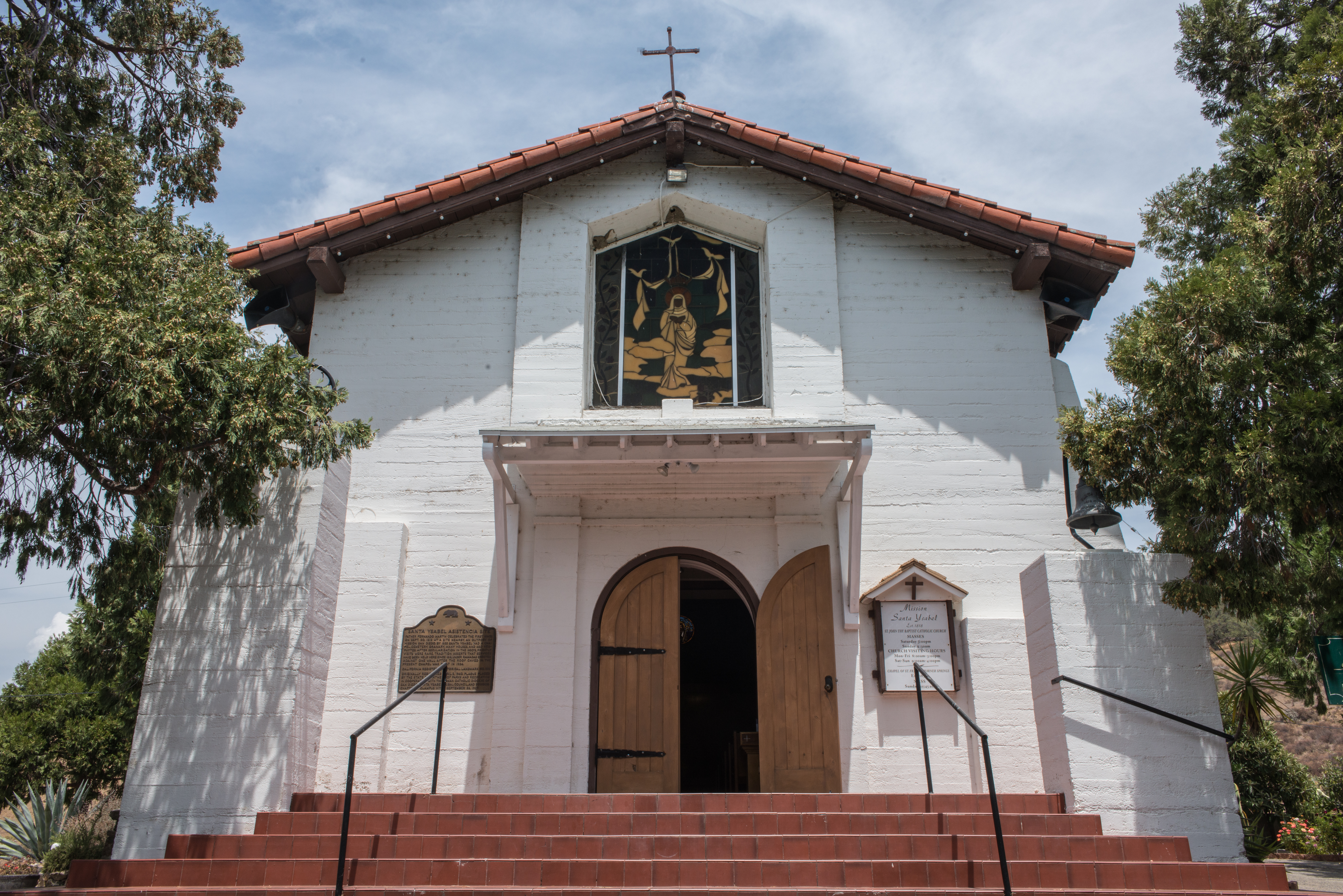
- The Church of Saint John the Baptist, erected on the site of the original Santa Ysabel Asistencia in 1924.

- Location within California
- Location: Santa Ysabel, California
- Coordinates: 33°7′49″N 116°40′41″W
- Name as founded: Asistencia de la Misión San Diego de Alcalá
- English translation: Sub-Mission of the Mission San Diego de Alcalá
- Patron: Saint Elizabeth (Isabel), Queen of Portugal
- Nickname: "Church of the Desert"
- Founded: September 20, 1818
- Founded by: Father Fernando Martín
- Military district: First
- Native tribe: Kumeyaay (Ipai), Payomkowishum; Diegueño, Luiseño
- Native place name: Elcuanan
- Governing body: Roman Catholic Diocese of San Diego
- Current use: Chapel / Museum

California Historical Landmark
- Reference no.: #369

The Santa Ysabel Asistencia was founded on September 20, 1818, at Cañada de Santa Ysabel in the mountains east of San Diego (near the village of Elcuanan), as a asistencia or "sub-mission" to Mission San Diego de Alcalá, and to serve as a rest stop for those travelling between San Diego and Sonora. The native population of approximately 450 neophytes consisted of both Luiseño and Diegueño peoples. Based on historical records, Santa Ysabel enjoyed a higher-than-average conversion rate when compared to the other California missions. Given its remote location, the facility was visited infrequently by the padres after secularization of the missions in the 1830s.

== History ==
=== Mission era (1769–1833) ===
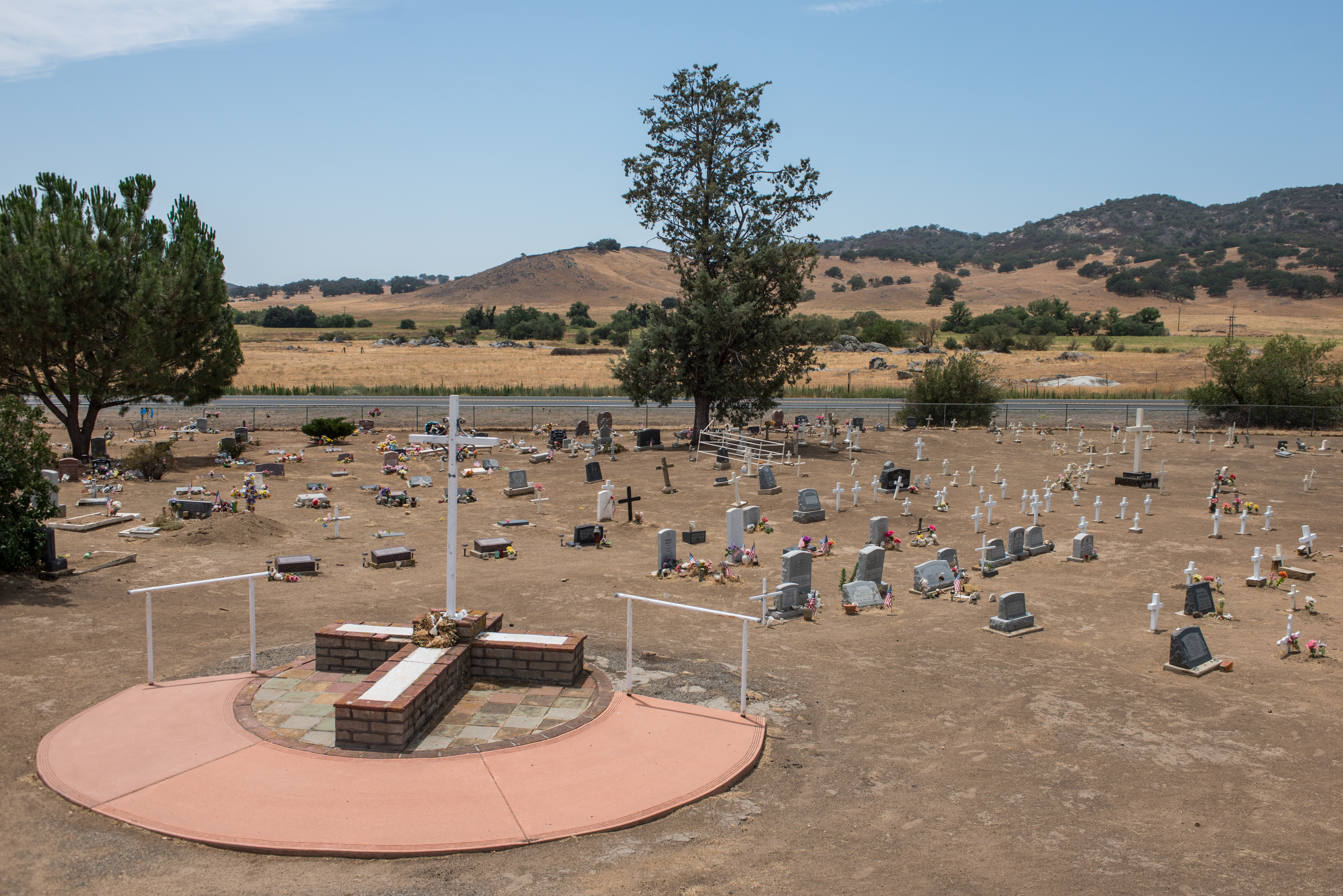
Cemetery at Santa Ysabel Asistencia

Father Juan Mariner first visited the site in 1795. In 1816, mission fathers in San Diego formally requested permission from the Spanish Governor to establish the asistencia. Fray Martin presided over the inaugural mass on the last day of September 1818. By 1821, a chapel, granary, several adobe houses, and a cemetery had all been constructed on the site. In September of that same year Father Mariano Payeras, "Comisario Prefecto" of the California Missions, visited the area as part of a plan to establish an entire chain of inland missions, with Santa Ysabel as the "mother" mission. The plan never came to fruition, however.

=== Rancho era (1834–1849) ===
The missions were secularized in 1834, and Jose Joaquin Ortega and Edward Stokes received the Rancho Santa Ysabel Mexican land grant in 1844. A wagon road to Warner's Ranch from San Diego passed through the site from this time. In 1846, General Stephen W. Kearny and the "Army of the West" made camp on the rancho on their way to the Battle of San Pasqual following this road.

Jean Baptiste Charbonneau, son of Sacagawea, camped at the Mission in 1847 after guiding the Mormon Battalion from New Mexico to San Diego. In 1849, U.S. Army Lieutenant A.W. Whipple visited the site during the course of the United States and Mexican Boundary Survey and documented the Mission's condition as being "in ruins."

=== California statehood (1850–1900) ===
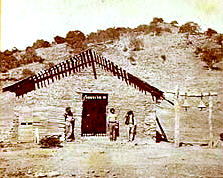
The chapel at Santa Ysabel Asistencia, c. 1875.

In 1850, the roof caved in and shelters were erected against one wall in order to allow religious services could continue. John Russell Bartlett, an American traveller who passed by the Mission proper in 1852, noted that the facility consisted of little more than a roofless church and a few simple huts; nothing remains of the original structures due to neglect over the years.

By 1857 there were some American settlers there, and a way station for the coaches of the San Antonio-San Diego Mail Line between San Diego and Carrizo Creek Station via the Warner's Ranch road, and then on the Southern Emigrant Trail to Rancho Valle de San Felipe, Vallecito and on to Carrizo. San Ysabel was 24 miles from Warner's and 28 miles from San Pasqual through Rancho Valle de Pamo (also called Rancho Santa María). That line ran through San Ysabel until 1860.

In 1898 The Santa Ysabel Indian Reservation was established.

=== The 20th century and beyond (1901 – present) ===
After three acres of the original Mission compound are returned to the Roman Catholic Church, Father Joseph Exalaphat Lapointe, a French-Canadian missionary, came to Santa Ysabel in 1903 to work with the locals.(Padres and Indians: Settling San Diego County's Frontier by Sandra A. Maynes, 2001). The cornerstone for a new, Mission Revival Style chapel (situated atop the site of the former adobe) was laid on September 14, 1924.

LaPointe died in 1932 and was buried next to the chapel.

== The "Mystery of the Lost Bells" ==
Bells were vitally important to daily life at any mission. The bells were rung at mealtimes, to call the Mission residents to work and to religious services, during births and funerals, to signal the approach of a ship or returning missionary, and at other times; novices were instructed in the intricate rituals associated with the ringing the mission bells. In 1846, two bells, the oldest in Alta California, were purchased from Misión Nuestra Señora de Loreto Conchó (Our Lady of Loreto) in Loreto, Baja California Sur, Mexico in exchange for six burro loads of barley and wheat. The bells were inscribed: "N.S. De Loreto 1723" and "San Pedro 1767." After the Mission began to deteriorate in the 1830s, and the bells were hoisted onto the yoke shown in the photograph at right. On a summer night, in 1926, the bells disappeared, apparently stolen. The day after they disappeared, a local named Jose Maria Osuna found the clappers (bell ringers) and took them home for safekeeping. After Osuna's death, the clappers were passed down to others, until they were eventually returned to the Mission in 1959. In 1966, a remnant of one of the bells was discovered; details regarding where and how it was found have never been revealed.

In 1993, a local molder named Ed Schwaesdall and his son John struck a new bell (made mostly of brass and copper) and donated it to the Mission in honor of the installation's 175th anniversary.

In 2012, a piece of one of the mission's original two bells was recovered after the unearthing of an anonymous account of them in an oral history transcription.

== See also ==
- List of Spanish missions in California
- Mission San Diego de Alcalá
- Mission San Luis Rey de Francia
- Mission San Juan Capistrano
