= Antonio Garra =

Cupeño leader who led the Garra uprising of 1851

- Born: Kupa (Agua Caliente), in present-day San Diego County, California
- Died: January 10, 1852; San Diego, California
- Cause of death: Execution by firing squad
- Known for: Leading the 1851 Garra uprising (also called the “Indian tax rebellion”)

Antonio Garra (died January 10, 1852) was a leader of the Cupeño people (from Kupa/Agua Caliente in present-day San Diego County, California) who organized resistance in 1851 to U.S. and county policies in Southern California that included attempts to levy taxes on Native communities. Garra was captured after the uprising and executed by firing squad in San Diego following a court-martial proceeding reported in contemporary and later historical accounts.

== Garra uprising of 1851 ==
=== Background and causes ===
In 1850–1851, San Diego County officials attempted to collect property taxes from Native communities despite their lack of political rights under U.S. governance in California. Historian Richard L. Carrico notes that Sheriff Agoston Haraszthy asserted that "Christianized Indians" were taxable, and that the taxation push combined with land loss to squatters and broader instability contributed to the uprising associated with Antonio Garra. The Native American Heritage Commission similarly summarizes the conflict as organized resistance to an "illegal tax" imposed by county authorities, followed by a broad crackdown on Native communities.

=== Plans, alliances, and early fighting ===
A later narrative in the Los Angeles Times describes Garra attempting to coordinate a multi-group alliance across Southern California and the lower Colorado River, and outlines plans (partly unrealized) for attacks on Anglo settlements and military posts; it reports that some groups declined to join while others—including Quechan and Cocopah groups along the river—agreed to fight. In November 1851, fighting escalated along the Colorado River corridor; the Los Angeles Times account reports an encounter in which five American sheepherders were killed and a siege attempt was made against Camp Independence (near the river crossing), which failed.

A 1952 compilation of historical materials by B. D. Wilson (published as The Indians of southern California in 1852) also describes widespread alarm among settlers over a rumored "general Indian uprising," and credits the Cahuilla leader Juan Antonio with arresting Garra with a small party of warriors, illustrating the extent to which Native political divisions shaped the conflict’s outcome.

=== Suppression and capture ===
Carrico characterizes the uprising as running from November 1851 into mid-January 1852 and emphasizes that "friendly" Native groups—including some Cahuilla and northern Diegueño/Kumeyaay—sided with Anglo forces, contributing to the rapid suppression of the revolt. The NAHC account likewise emphasizes a "massive crackdown" on Indian communities following "sporadic attacks," and states that a rival Cahuilla leader captured Garra and turned him over to authorities.

=== Trial and execution ===
Contemporary reporting indicates Garra was tried by a military tribunal and executed in January 1852. The Sacramento Daily Union reported that Garra "was shot on the 10th inst., at San Diego, by order of the Court Martial." A later local history published by the San Diego History Center (William E. Smythe’s History of San Diego, 1542–1908) also places his execution on January 10, 1852, and describes the circumstances surrounding it.

Carrico notes that multiple leaders were executed and that some villages were burned in the course of suppression, after which “southern California returned to normal,” in the phrasing of the period sources he summarizes.

== Capture and execution ==
Garra was captured and taken to San Diego, where he was tried by court-martial and executed by firing squad. The Sacramento Daily Union reported that Garra “was shot on the 10th inst., at San Diego, by order of the Court Martial,” describing his death as occurring in January 1852. A detailed narrative published by the San Diego History Center (William E. Smythe’s History of San Diego, 1542–1908) also places the execution on January 10, 1852, and describes clergy attendance and preparations for the firing squad.

== Legacy ==
The uprising has been described as an early episode of organized Native resistance during California’s early statehood, with the crackdown believed to have helped shape subsequent relations between the state and Native communities. In recent years, public commemorations such as "Antonio Garra Day" have emphasized Garra’s role as a symbol of Indigenous resistance and sovereignty in Southern California.

== See also ==
- Cupeño
- California genocide
- Native Americans in the United States
- Warner Springs, California
