= Rancho San José del Valle =

Mexican land grant in California

Coordinates: 33.290°N 116.680°W

- Land Grant
- Interactive map of Rancho San José del Valle
- Country: Mexico
- State: California
- County: San Diego
- Established: 1840 (José Antonio Pico), 1844 (Juan José Warner)
- Founder: José Antonio Pico, Juan José Warner

Rancho San José del Valle (also called "Rancho Agua Caliente" or "Warner's Rancho") was a 26,689-acre (108.01 km^{2}) Mexican land grant in present-day San Diego County, California, given in 1840 by Governor Juan B. Alvarado to José Antonio Pico, and then given in 1844 by Governor Manuel Micheltorena to Juan José Warner. The most northeasterly grant made within present-day San Diego County, it was bounded on the west by Palomar Mountain, and on the south by Buena Vista Creek and Rancho Valle de San Jose, and encompassed present-day Warner Springs. The western part of the grant is under the waters of Lake Henshaw, formed in 1922 by a dam on the San Luis Rey River.

== History ==
In 1840, Governor Alvarado granted José Antonio Pico, a member of the Pico family of California, whose brother Andrés Pico was then administrator of the mission, made formal application for "the place called Agua Caliente", belonging to the Mission San Luis Rey. Continued trouble with the Indians probably caused Pico to abandon the land.

Jonathan T. Warner (1807–1895), better known as Juan José Warner, was in born in Connecticut. He settled at Los Angeles in 1831 and in 1836 married Anita Gale, daughter of a Boston sea captain, who had been brought to California when five years of age and placed in the care of the Pico family, by whom she was adopted. In 1844, Governor Micheltorena granted the six square league Rancho San Jose Del Valle to Juan José Warner.

With the cession of California to the United States following the Mexican–American War, the 1848 Treaty of Guadalupe Hidalgo provided that the land grants would be honored. As required by the Land Act of 1851, a claim for Rancho San José del Valle was filed with the Public Land Commission in 1852, and the grant was patented to Juan J. Warner in 1880. A claim by Juan J. Warner for four more square leagues (Rancho Camajal y Palomar) west of Rancho San José del Valle was rejected.

By about 1875, Louis Phillips and John G. Downey (1827–1894) owned most of the southern four square league Portilla Rancho Valle de San José and the northern six square league Warner Rancho San José del Valle. In 1880 Downey became sole owner. Downey leased the ranch to Walter Vail in 1888.

The rights of the Cupeño American Indians to occupy the land became a controversial matter. In 1901, the US Supreme Court concurred with the finding of the lower courts that a U.S. Government patent of ownership conferred absolute ownership, and the Indians were ordered ejected.

Pacific Light and Power Company acquired the ranch in 1905. William G. Henshaw acquired the ranch in 1911. Henshaw later organized the San Diego County Water Company. The Vista Irrigation District purchased the properties of the San Diego Water Company in 1946.

== Historic sites of the Rancho ==
- Warner's Ranch
