= Warner's Ranch =

- U.S. National Register of Historic Places
- U.S. National Historic Landmark
- California Historical Landmark
- Location within San Diego County, California Location within California Location within the United States
- Nearest city: Warner Springs, California
- Coordinates: 33°14′19″N 116°39′3″W
- Built: 1849
- NRHP reference No.: 66000228
- CHISL No.: 311

Significant dates
- Added to NRHP: October 15, 1966
- Designated NHL: January 20, 1961
- Designated CHISL: 1939

Warner's Ranch, near Warner Springs, California, was notable as a way station for large numbers of emigrants on the Southern Emigrant Trail from 1849 to 1861, as it was a stop on both the Gila River Trail and the Butterfield Overland Mail stagecoach line (1859-1861). It was also operated as a pioneering cattle ranch.

The 221-acre (0.89 km^{2}) property, with two original adobe buildings from 1849 and 1857, was declared a California Historical Landmark in 1939, and a National Historic Landmark in 1961. There is evidence that travelers stayed at the original 1849 ranch house. The ranch is located 4 miles (6.4 km) south of Warner Springs.

== History ==
This area had long been inhabited by the Cupeño American Indians, who first encountered Europeans when Spanish missionaries arrived in the area. The Cupeño were forced into the colonial mission system and over time lost control of their land, although under Mexican law they were supposed to receive rights to land which they tilled and settled. They continued to live and work in the area, however.

In 1830, Juan José Warner (born John Trumball Warner) left Connecticut and headed to California, passing through this valley. He worked as a fur trader and merchant in Los Angeles. By 1844, he had become a naturalized Mexican citizen and changed his name to Juan José. He received the Rancho San Jose del Valle Mexican land grant. Warner established a successful trading post there in the San José Valley, and purchased cattle from Rancho Santa Margarita; this lasted until 1851.

On December 2, 1846, Stephen Watts Kearney, with a small command from New Mexico, reached the ranch on what proved to be his way to the Battle of San Pasqual. He was later followed by the Mormon Battalion, that was establishing the route of Cooke's Wagon Road from New Mexico to California.

More importantly, from 1849 to 1851, Warner operated part of the ranch to serve travelers on the Gila River Emigrant Trail (part of the Southern Emigrant Trail). He opened the only trading post between New Mexico and Los Angeles on a wagon road developed after the Mexican–American War. Thousands of emigrants began flowing to California. This trail later was used by the Butterfield Overland Mail stagecoach line, from 1857 to 1861.

When California became part of the United States, new obligations for taxes were applied to the Cupeño. Many of them worked on the Warner ranch, which had a negative reputation for severe treatment of Indians. In 1851, at the beginning of the Garra Revolt, an uprising by the local Cupeño tribe under Antonio Garra, Warner was attacked at his ranch. He sent his family to Los Angeles. Some of the ranch buildings were burned, but Warner continued to operate it, until his grant was challenged by a former claimant.

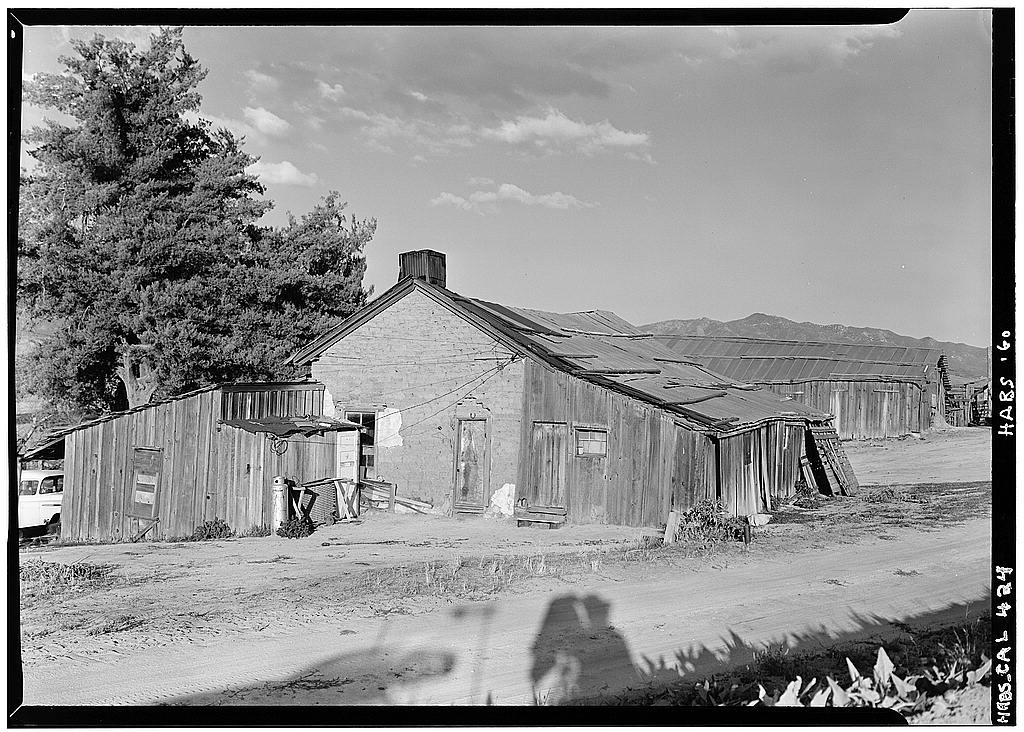
Warner's Ranch, Ranch House, San Felipe Road (CR S2), October 1960

Warner's Ranch was a stop on the San Antonio-San Diego Mail Line in 1857 and the Butterfield Overland Mail stagecoach line between 1858 and 1860. It was linked to San Diego by the San Diego - Fort Yuma mail route via the road through Santa Isabel to San Diego. Travelers rested here along their journey, after the trip through the desert.

During the American Civil War, Union troops established Camp Wright on the grounds of Warner's Ranch on October 18, 1861. The installation was designed to protect California from attack along the route of the emigrant travel route between Arizona and California. Due to difficulties caused by frequent high winds on the exposed position, the location of the camp was moved by Major Edwin A. Rigg, 1st California Infantry on November 23, 1861, to Oak Grove Butterfield Stage Station some 20 miles (32 km) to the north, also in San Diego County.

The ranch passed through several hands until in 1880, John G. Downey, former governor of California, became sole owner of Warner's Ranch. He started legal efforts in 1892 to evict the Cupeño. They challenged his actions under provisions of Mexican and United States law, but lost their case in the U.S. Supreme Court in 1901. The court ruled they were correct in their assessment of rights to the land, but had waited too long to press their claim. The case was followed closely by many citizens who had sympathy for the Cupeño. They tried to purchase their own land but were unable to raise sufficient funds. The local tribe was relocated to Pala Indian Reservation on May 12, 1903.

The first advertising for the hot springs was in 1894. Gradually a resort was developed, called Warner Hot Springs, which became popular in the 1950s.

The ranch house was designated a National Historic Landmark in 1961. The 221-acre (0.89 km^{2}) property holds the now-restored 1849 adobe ranch house and the Restored 1857 Carillo Adobe and barn which was the original Butterfield Stage Station and Trading Post.

== Today ==
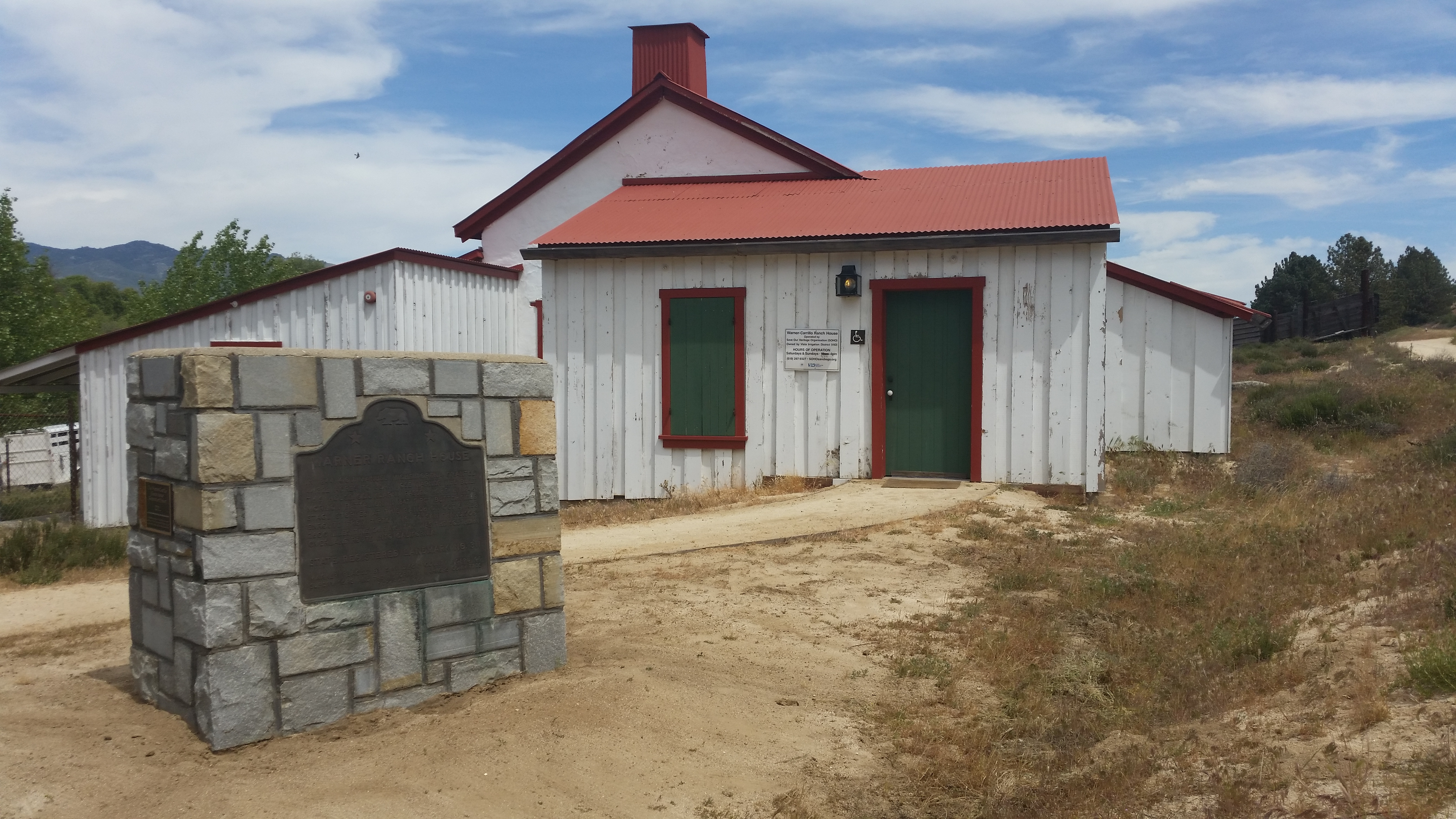
California historic landmark plaque and adobe ranch house in 2017

The historic portion includes an adobe ranch house and barn. The Ranch House has been restored and open to the public on weekends 12PM to 4PM and by appointment.
