= Santa Maria Valley (San Diego County) =

Valley in California, United States

Coordinates: 33°02′09″N 116°53′14″W

Santa Maria Valley is a valley in northeastern San Diego County, California.

== Geography ==
The town of Ramona is located in the valley.

Santa Maria Valley is located between mountain ranges of the Peninsular Ranges System.
