= Mission San Diego de Alcalá =

18th-century Spanish mission in California

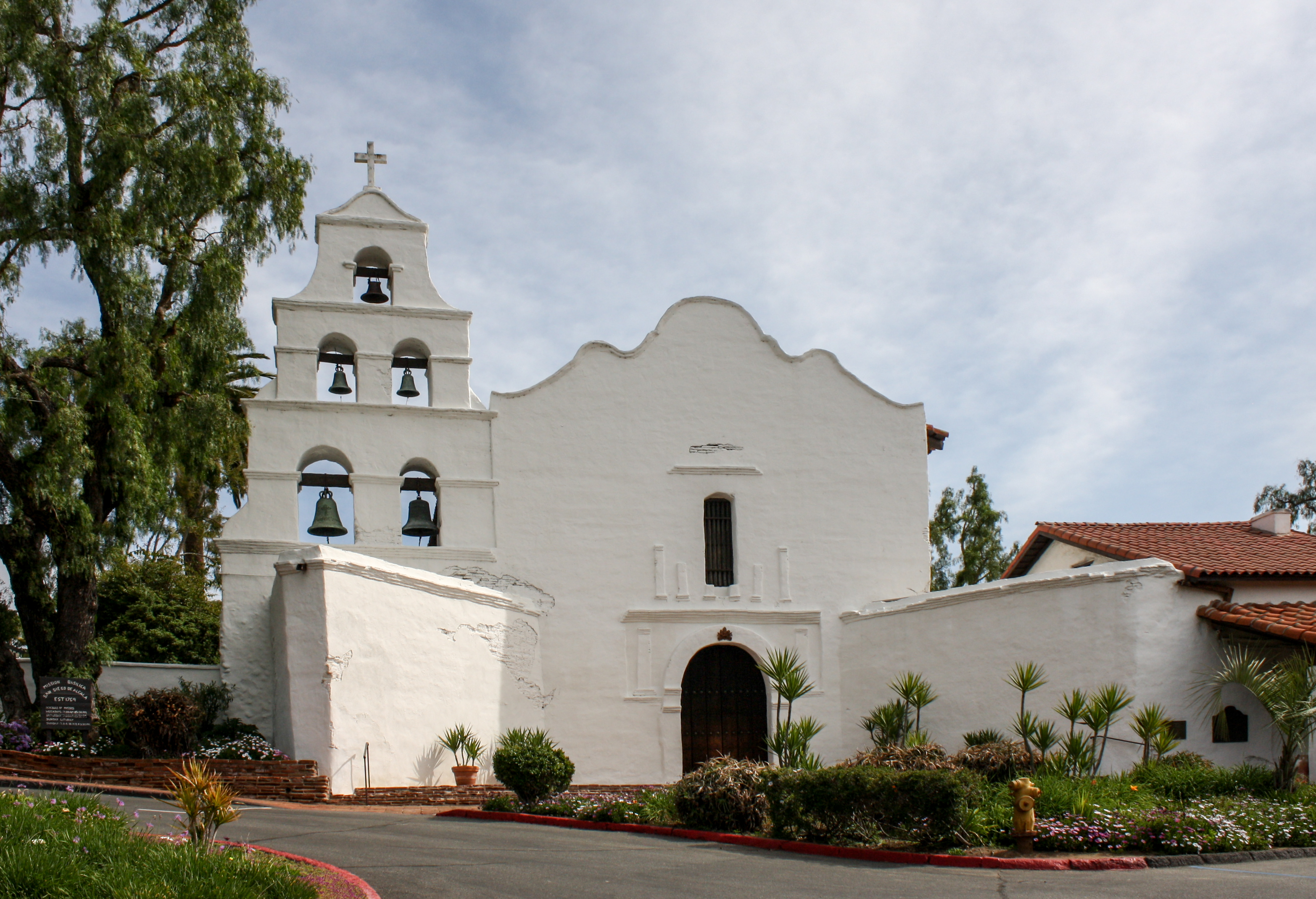
- The church façade of Mission San Diego de Alcalá

- Location in San Diego Mission San Diego de Alcalá (California) Mission San Diego de Alcalá (the United States)
- Location: 10818 San Diego Mission Rd. San Diego, California 92108-2429
- Coordinates: 32°47′4″N 117°6′23″W
- Name as founded: La Misión San Diego de Alcalá
- English translation: The Mission of Saint Didacus of Acalá
- Patron: Saint Didacus of Alcalá
- Nickname: "Mother of the Alta California Missions"
- Founded: July 16, 1769
- Founded by: Father Presidente Junípero Serra
- Built: 1769
- Architect: Fr. Jose Bernardo Sanchez
- Founding Order: First
- Headquarters of the Alta California Mission System: 1769–1771
- Military district: First
- Native tribe: Kumeyaay (Ipai / Tipai); Diegueño
- Native place name: Kosoi, Nipawai
- Baptisms: 6,522
- Confirmations: 1,379
- Marriages: 1,794
- Burials: 4,322
- Neophyte population: 1,455
- Secularized: 1834
- Returned to the Church: 1862
- Governing body: Roman Catholic Diocese of San Diego
- Current use: Parish Church

U.S. National Register of Historic Places
- Official name: San Diego Mission Church
- Designated: April 15, 1970
- Reference no.: 70000144

U.S. National Historic Landmark
- Designated: April 15, 1970

California Historical Landmark
- Reference no.: #242

San Diego Historic Landmark
- Designated: October 6, 1976
- Reference no.: 113

Website
- missionsandiego.org

Mission Basilica San Diego de Alcalá (Spanish: Misión San Diego de Alcalá, lit. The Mission of Saint Didacus of Acalá) was the second Franciscan-founded mission in the Californias (after San Fernando de Velicata), a province of New Spain. Located in present-day San Diego, California, it was founded on July 16, 1769, by Spanish friar Junípero Serra, in an area long inhabited by the Kumeyaay people. The current church, built in the early 19th century, is the fifth to stand on this location. The mission site is a National Historic Landmark.

The mission and the surrounding area were named for the Catholic saint Didacus of Alcalá, a Spaniard more commonly known as San Diego. The mission was the site of the first Christian burial in Alta California. The original mission burned in 1775 during an uprising by local natives. San Diego is also generally regarded as the site of the region's first public execution, in 1778. Father Luis Jayme, California's first Christian martyr who was among those killed during the 1775 uprising against the mission, lies entombed beneath the chancel floor.

== History ==
The former Spanish settlement at the Kumeyaay Nipawai lies within that area occupied during the late Paleoindian period and continuing into the present day by the Native society commonly known as the Diegueño; the name denotes those people who were served by the padres at Mission San Diego de Alcalá. Relatively, much is known about the native inhabitants in recent centuries, thanks in part to the efforts of Juan Rodríguez Cabrillo, who explored the coast in the service of Spain. He documented his travels in the coastal villages he encountered along the Southern California coast in October 1542. Cabrillo was the first European to set foot in what is now the state of California and the first to encounter San Diego Bay. On the evening of September 28, 1542, the ships San Salvador and Victoria sailed into the harbor, whereupon Cabrillo christened it "San Miguel". During that expedition a landing party went ashore and briefly interacted with a small group of natives. Some sixty years later another Spanish explorer, Sebastián Vizcaíno, made landfall some ten miles from the present Mission site. Under Vizcaíno's command the San Diego, Santo Tomás, and frigate Tres Reyes dropped anchor on November 10, 1602, and the port was renamed "San Diego de Alcalá". It would be another 167 years before the Spanish returned to San Diego.

Ever since the voyages of Christopher Columbus, the Kingdom of Spain sought to establish missions to convert the pagans in Nueva España ("New Spain") to Roman Catholicism to save souls and to facilitate colonization of these lands. However, it was not until 1741—the time of the Vitus Bering expedition, when the territorial ambitions of Tsarist Russia towards North America became known—that King Philip V felt such installations were necessary for Upper California. In 1769, Visitador General José de Gálvez sent the expedition of Junípero Serra and Gaspar de Portolà to found missions and presidios at San Diego and Monterey (see Timeline of the Portolà expedition), thereby securing Spain's claim to the Pacific coast harbors recommended by Cabrillo and Vizcaino. Two groups traveled from Lower California on foot, while a pair of packet ships (bearing supplies) traveled up the coast from the Baja California peninsula.

The original mission church was destroyed by fire in 1775 during an uprising by local indigenous people. An estimated 600 plus "American Indians" pillaged the mission, burned it to the ground and massacred a blacksmith, a carpenter (mortally wounded), and Father Jayme, who became California's first Catholic Martyr. Father Jayme is buried next to the altar in the present church. Survivors of the night-long attack were one corporal and three Leather Jacket soldiers, one blacksmith, two children who were the son and nephew of the Presidio commandant, and Associate Pastor Father Vicente Fuster. Father Serra then returned to the site of the original structure in 1776 to oversee the rebuilding of the mission. However, the scarce amount of water and the difficulty of making the land until (feasible for preparing crops to be planted by plowing and fertilizing) made the re-establishment of the mission a long and difficult process. From 1778 to 1795, the mission focused on horse and mule breeding, providing other missions in Alta and Baja California an average of 16 animals per year. After it was restored as a Catholic mission, Mission San Diego de Alcalá saw a record number of spiritual results recorded when 567 baptisms were performed, and neophytes numbered 908.

=== Rancho period (1834–1849) ===
On August 9, 1834, Governor Figueroa issued his "Decree of Confiscation". The missions were offered for sale to citizens, who were unable to come up with the price, so all mission property was broken up into ranchos and given to ex-military officers who had fought in the War of Independence against Spain. On June 8, 1846, Mission San Diego de Alcalá was given to Santiago Argüello by Governor Pío Pico "for services rendered to the government". After the United States invaded California, the Mission was used by the military from 1846 to 1862.

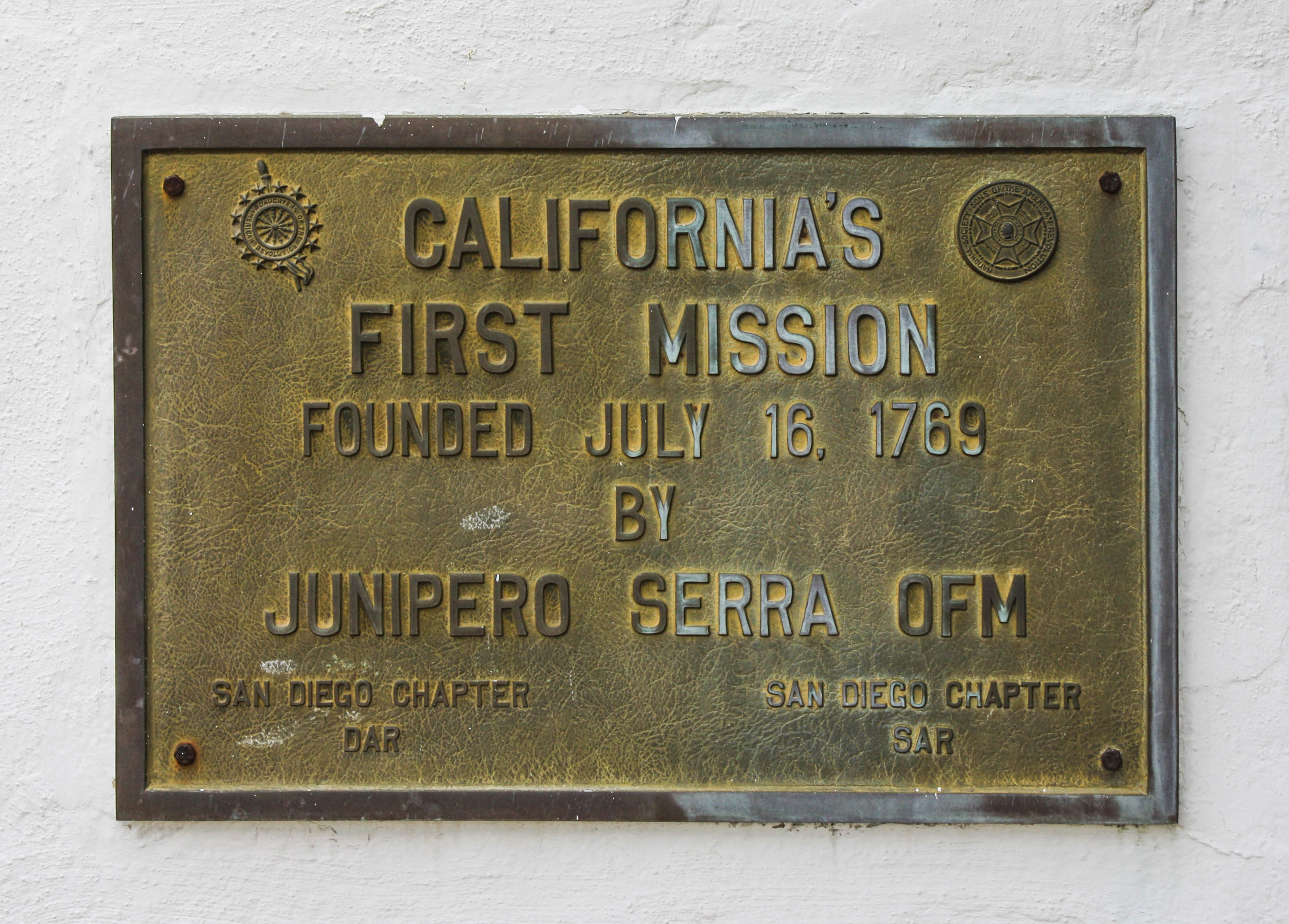
Plaque of Mission San Diego de Alcala

The Mission San Diego de Alcalá sign and white-washed façade (2026)

=== California statehood (1850–1900) ===
President Abraham Lincoln signed a proclamation on May 23, 1862, that restored ownership of the Mission proper to the Roman Catholic Church. When Mission San Diego de Alcalá was granted back to the Church, it was in ruins. Starting as early as 1891, Father Antonio Ubach made efforts to find funds for restoration of the old Mission buildings.

=== 20th century and beyond (1901 – present) ===
Father Ubach died in 1907 and restoration work ceased until 1931. In 1941, the Mission once again became a parish church, in what is still an active parish serving the Diocese of San Diego. In 1976, Pope Paul VI designated the Mission church as a minor basilica.

Mission San Diego de Alcalá is located within San Diego city limits, near the intersection of Interstate 8 and Interstate 15, and approximately one mile east of Snapdragon Stadium.

== Other historic designations ==
- California Historical Landmark #242
- California Historical Landmark #784 – El Camino Real (starting point in Alta California)
- City of San Diego Historic Designation #113

== Mission industries ==
The cattle brand used at Mission San Diego.

The goal of the missions was, above all, to become self-sufficient in relatively short order. Farming, therefore, was the most important industry of any mission. Before the establishment of the missions, the native peoples knew how to utilize bone, seashells, stone, and wood for building, tool making, weapons, and much more. The missionaries discovered that the Indians, who regarded labor as degrading to men, had to be taught industry to learn how to be self-supportive. The result was the establishment of a manual training school that comprised agriculture, the mechanical arts, and the raising and care of livestock. Everything consumed and otherwise utilized by the natives was produced at the missions under the supervision of the padres; thus, the neophytes not only supported themselves, but after 1811 sustained the entire military and civil government of California. Wheat, corn, wine grapes, barley, beans, cattle, horses, and sheep were the major crops at San Diego.

In 1795, construction on a system of aqueducts was begun to bring water to the fields and the Mission (the first irrigation project in Upper California). The building manager was Fray Pedro Panto, who was poisoned by his Indian cook Nazario before the project was completed. In his testimony, in the trial that followed, Nazario stated that he had poisoned the friar due to constant beatings inflicted by Friar Panto, part of an ongoing practice of abuses by Church authorities over indigenous people.

The Mission San Diego was primarily supported from lands included in a Spanish royal land grant, encompassing roughly the eastern third of the current City of San Diego, as well as most of the cities of La Mesa and Lemon Grove. While not exact, its boundaries are roughly Interstate 805, Miramar Road, California State Route 125, Skyline Drive, and Division Street. Boundary Street (which parallels Interstate 805 in the neighborhood of North Park) lies directly on one portion of the boundary and draws its name from it.

=== Wine ===
The first vineyards planted in California were planted at the mission in 1769. Father Junípero Serra planted these initial vines. The vines were of the Mission variety, which were brought to Mexico in the 16th century. Unfortunately, the initial plantings did not survive, with Mission San Juan Capistrano having the first surviving plantings. By at least 1781, wine was being produced at the mission. One source claims that the vineyard on mission lands reached up to fifty thousand acres. The mission vineyards were around until at least 1823.

== Gallery ==
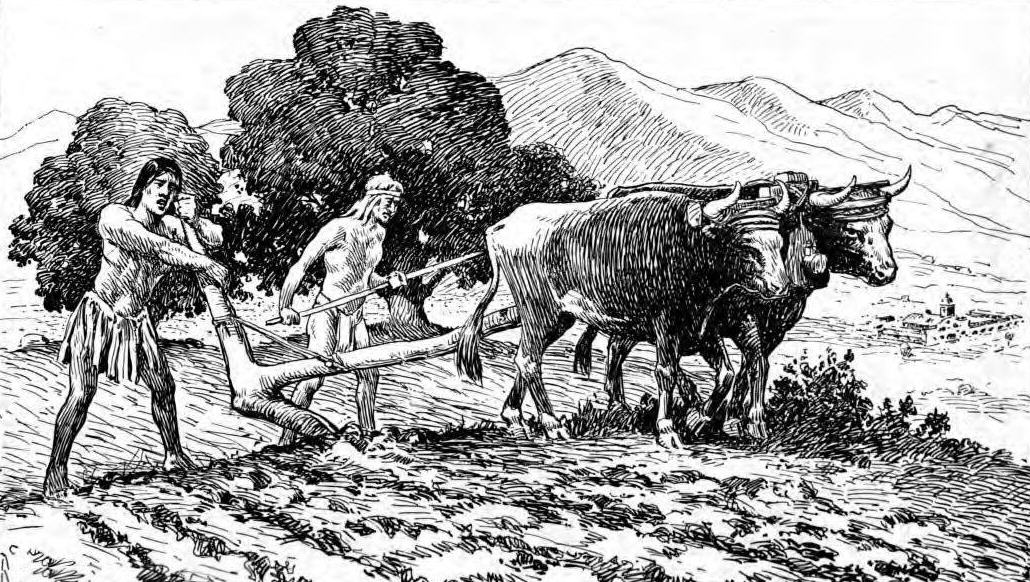
Natives utilize a primitive plow to prepare a field for planting near Mission San Diego de Alcalá.

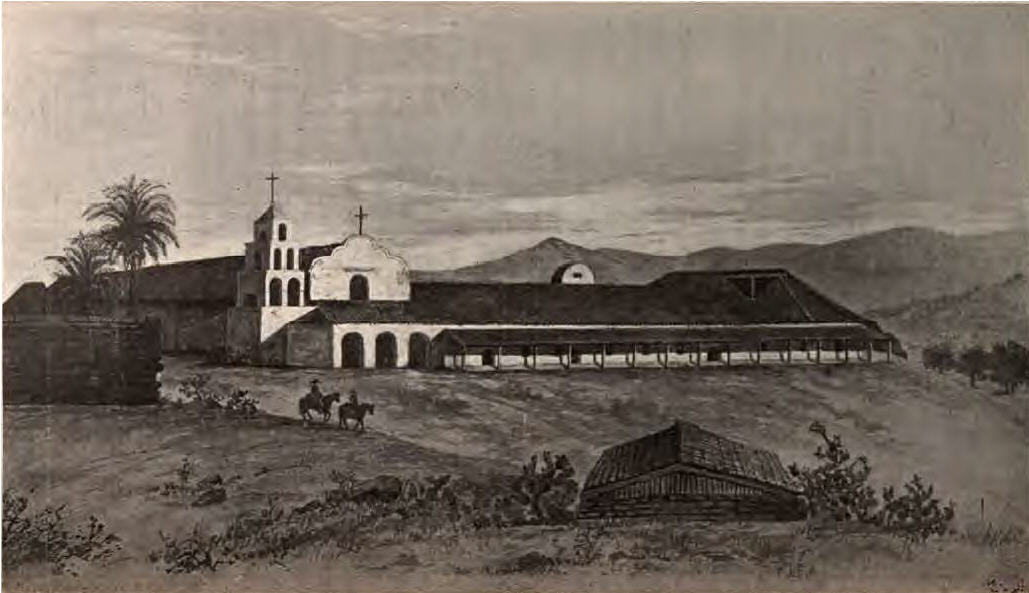
A painting of Mission San Diego de Alcalá as it appeared in 1848 depicts the original campanario ("bell tower"), before it was reduced to rubble. The painting also shows the enclosed front portico.

The "Alemany Plat" prepared by the United States General Land Office to define the property restored to the Catholic Church by the Public Land Commission, later confirmed by presidential proclamation on May 23, 1862.

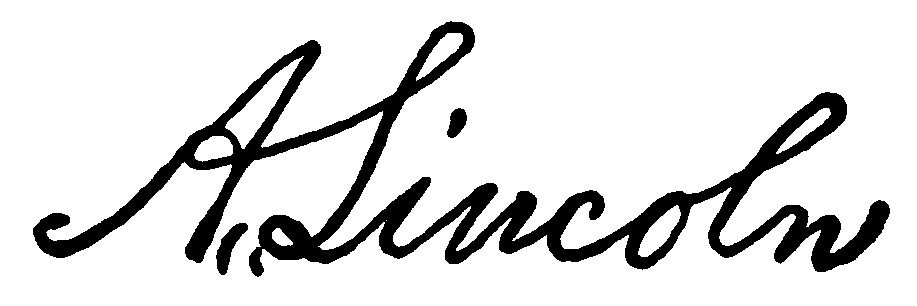
President Abraham Lincoln's signature as it appeared on the United States Patent that restored the Mission property to the Catholic Church in 1862. This is one of the few documents that the President signed as "A. Lincoln" instead of his customary "Abraham Lincoln".

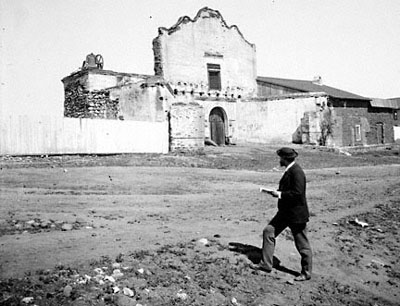
Mission San Diego de Alcalá as it stood circa 1900. Note the missing Campanario, and the exposed church, which fell into disrepair.

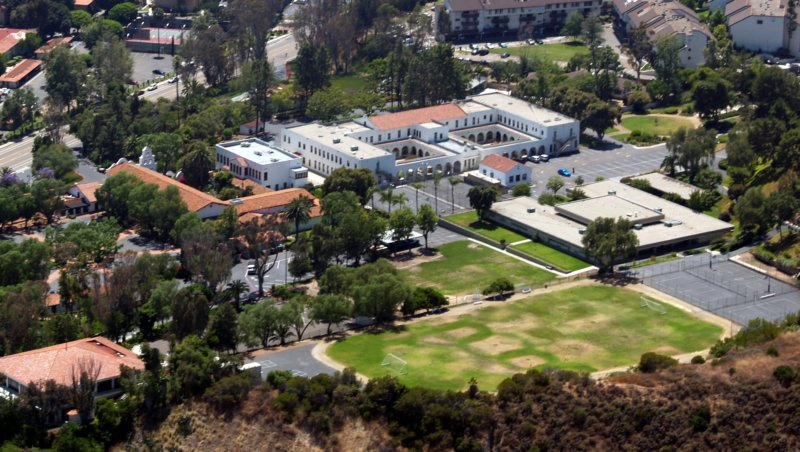
Aerial view of the Mission, 2011

== See also ==
- Spanish missions in California
- List of Spanish missions in California
- Santa Ysabel Asistencia
- Presidio of San Diego
- USNS Mission San Diego (AO-121) – a Mission Buenaventura Class fleet oiler built during World War II.
- Union Station (San Diego)
- List of the oldest buildings in the United States
- Pueblo de San Diego
