= Santa Ysabel, California =

Unincorporated community in California, United States

Santa Ysabel
- Unincorporated community
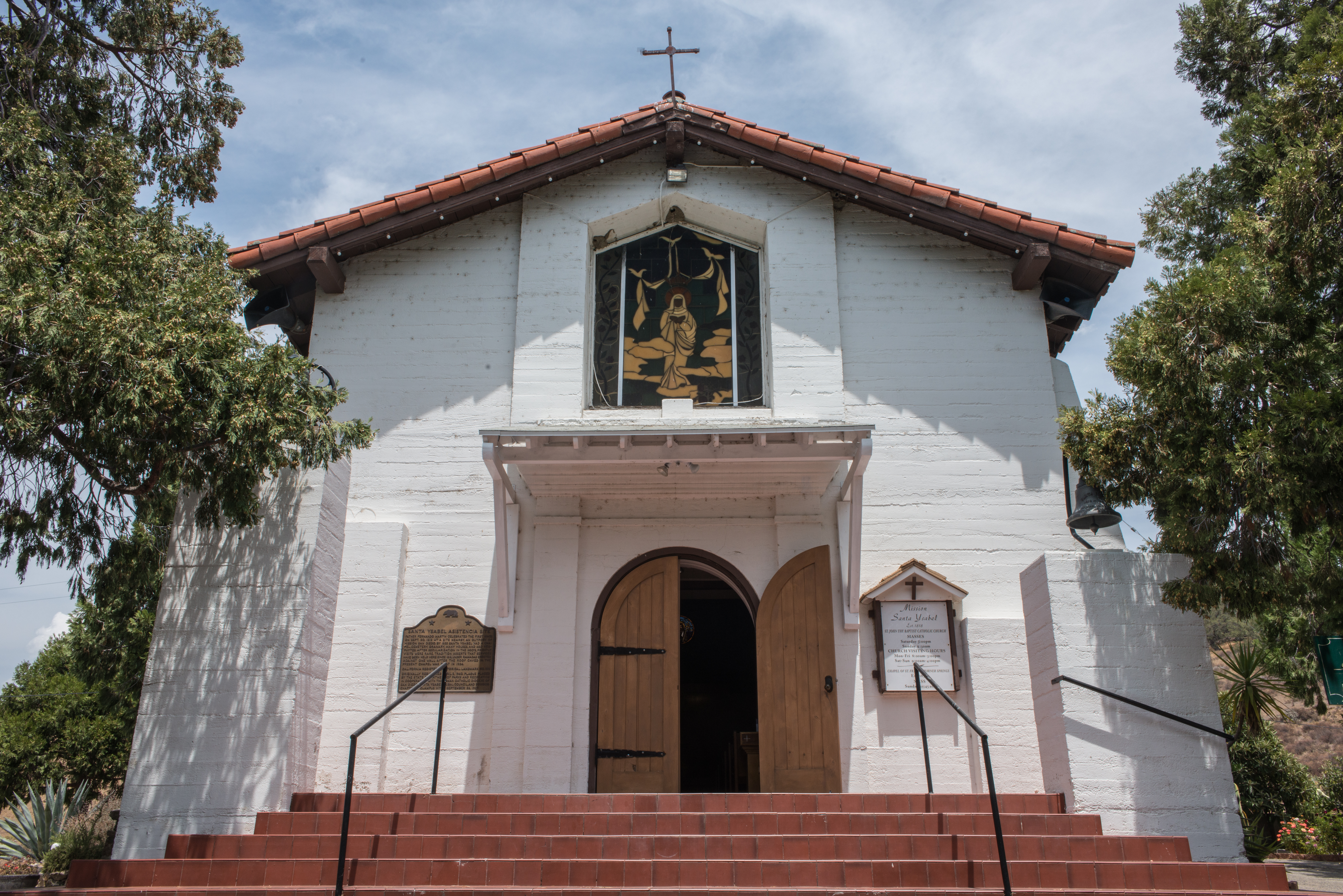
- Santa Ysabel Asistencia

- Location within the state of California Santa Ysabel (southern California) Santa Ysabel (California) Santa Ysabel (the United States)
- Coordinates: 33°6′33″N 116°40′23″W
- Country: United States
- State: California
- County: San Diego
- Time zone: UTC-8 (Pacific (PST))
  - Summer (DST): UTC-7 (PDT)
- ZIP codes: 92070
- Area codes: 442/760

Santa Ysabel (Spanish for "St. Elizabeth") is an unincorporated community in the Santa Ysabel Valley of eastern San Diego County, California.

== History ==
The 1818 Santa Ysabel Asistencia is located here, a Spanish mission asistencia (sub-mission) of Mission San Diego de Alcalá. The town site is within the former Rancho Santa Ysabel, an 1844 Mexican land grant to José Joaquín Ortega and Eduardo Stokes. In 1878, what began as the town of Santa Ysabel began with a store owned by C. R. Wellington, and grew to include a hotel and a blacksmith. By June 26, 1889, it had acquired its own post office.

== Today ==
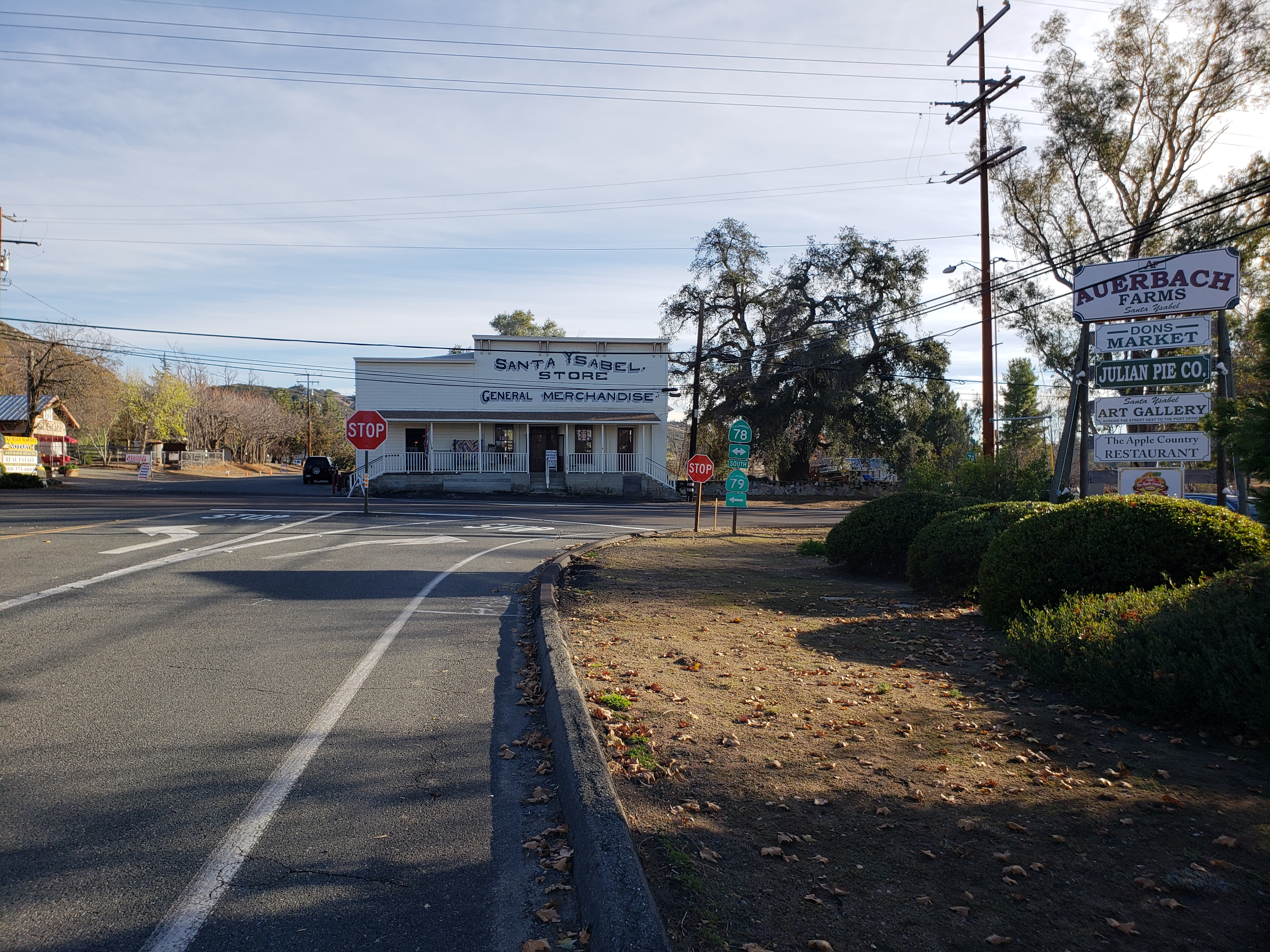
Historic Santa Ysabel store

The town is located near the San Diego River, just north of the Cleveland National Forest at the junction of Highway 78 and Highway 79.

Other notable sights of the small town include the famous Dudley's Bakery and the Julian Apple Pie factory. The town serves as a gateway to the mountain areas of San Diego County, including the Laguna Mountains, Julian, and Palomar Mountain.

== Climate ==
According to the Köppen climate classification system, Santa Ysabel has a warm-summer Mediterranean climate, abbreviated "Csa" on climate maps.
