= Butterfield Overland Mail in California =

Historic route by state

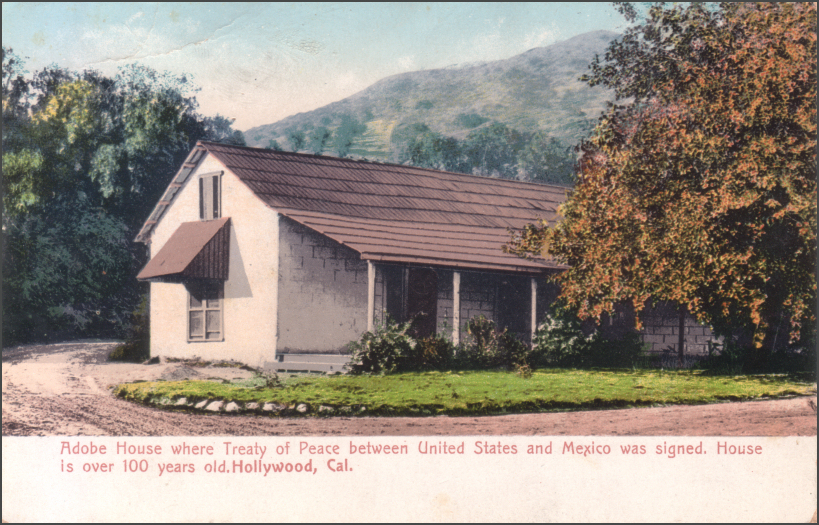
The Cahuenga stop was between San Fernando Mission station and Los Angeles and the junction point between divisions one and two of the route

The Butterfield Overland Mail in California was created by the United States Congress on March 3, 1857, and operated until June 30, 1861. Subsequently, other stage lines operated along the Butterfield Overland Mail in route in Alta California until the Southern Pacific Railroad arrived in Yuma, Arizona in 1877.

The route lasted from 1857 to 1861 and became one of the most important roads in the early settlement and development of California.

== First Division ==
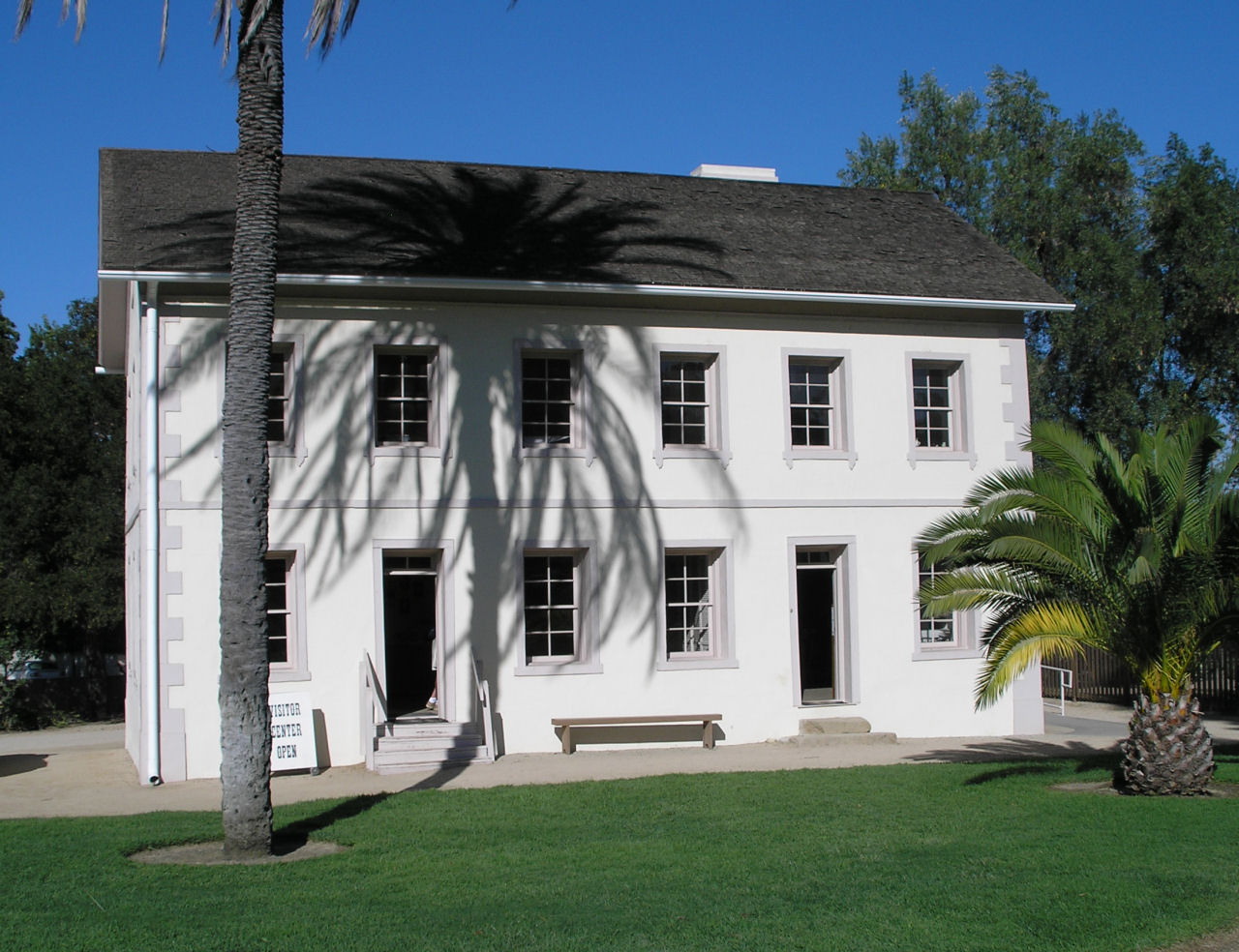
Rancho Los Encinos Stage Station, San Fernando Valley.

The First Division's California route north from Los Angeles followed the Stockton - Los Angeles Road that was established as a southern route to the goldfields during the California Gold Rush. The route went through the San Fernando Valley, with a stop at Rancho Los Encinos. It proceeded over Fremont Pass out of the Valley, up San Francisquito Canyon and over San Francisquito Pass, to the Fort Tejon Pass, where it dropped to the San Joaquin Valley.

The Butterfield route split off the Stockton - Los Angeles Road at Elkhorn Spring Station. From there it went west across the upper San Joaquin Valley, crossing El Camino Viejo on the Rancho San Luis Gonzaga (St. Louis Ranch). It crossed over the Diablo Mountains at Pacheco Pass to reach to Gilroy. It then proceeded north through the Santa Clara Valley and San Jose, to its western terminus in San Francisco, also the headquarters of the First Division of the Butterfield Overland Mail.

== Second Division ==
The Second Division's route from Fort Yuma to Warners Pass followed the Sonora Road, an old Spanish and Mexican trail from Sonora, México to San Diego. The Sonora Road linked with the Kearney Trail that was used during the Mexican–American War by the U.S. Army. During the California Gold Rush the route pioneered by Kearny and Cooke, with the addition of a road from Warner's Pass to the Pueblo of Los Angeles, became the Southern Emigrant Trail used by American immigrants.

The route crossed the Colorado River from New Mexico Territory at present day Yuma, Arizona to Fort Yuma in California, then descended into Baja California Mexico for 129 miles (208 km) to avoid the Algodones Dunes sand barrier in the dry southern Colorado Desert. The Mexican route also provided stations with water in the Sonoran Desert, from the Colorado River's spring flooding into the Alamo River and New River.

The route then reentered California to cross the Yuha Desert, and proceeded through the present day Carrizo Impact Area, then up Carrizo Wash through the Carrizo Badlands, to Carrizo Springs Station. It proceeded up Carrizo Creek through the present-day Carrizo Impact Area, towards the oasis of Vallecito Station. From there the route ascended northwest into the Peninsular Ranges, crossing the Laguna Mountains at Warner's Pass to Warner's Ranch Station, and then on to Temecula Station. This route's terminus was Los Angeles, the headquarters of the Second Division of the Overland Mail. The 2nd Division was headquartered in a brick building at the Pueblo de Los Angeles, consisting of an office, blacksmith shop, stables and sheds.

== Stations added later ==
Later some of the larger gaps between stations were filled by six new stations.

- Four were added in the southern Colorado Desert, within present day Imperial County (California) and Baja California state (México), to provide more water and fresh horses needed in the hot desert climate. One of these was Sackett's Wells, located 17.5 miles (28.2 km) southeast of Carrizo Creek Station and 15 miles (24 km) northwest of Indian Wells Station.
- A fifth was added in the western Mojave Desert, at Mud Spring in the Antelope Valley.
- A sixth was added in the Temecula Valley of the Peninsular Ranges, the Willow Springs Station.

== List of 1st Division stations ==
- San Francisco – Western terminus and 1st Division headquarters, located in downtown San Francisco.
- Clarks's Station – Located 12 miles south of San Francisco in what is now San Bruno.
- Sun Water Station – Located 9 miles south of Clarks Station in what is now San Mateo.
- Redwood City – Located 9 miles south of Sun Water Station.
- Mountain View Station – Located 12 miles south of Redwood City.
- San Jose Station – Located 11 miles south of Mountain View Station in the city of San Jose.
- Seventeen Mile House – Located 17 miles south of San Jose.
- Gilroy Station – Located 13 miles south of Seventeen Mile House in what is now Gilroy, California.
- Pacheco Pass Station – Located 18 miles east of Gilroy near the top of Pacheco Pass.
- St. Louis Ranch – Located 17 miles east of Pacheco Pass.
- Lone Willow Station – Located 18 miles east of St. Louis Ranch near Los Banos.
- Temple's Ranch – Located 13 miles southeast of Lone Willow Station near Dos Palos.
- Firebaugh's Ferry – Located 15 miles southeast of Temples Ranch, on the San Joaquin River.
- Fresno City – Located 19 miles southeast of Firebaugh's Ferry.
- Elkhorn Spring Station – Located 22 miles east of Fresno City near present-day Riverdale.
- Whitmore's Ferry – Located 17 miles southeast of Elkhorn Spring Station on the Kings River.
- Head of Cross Creek Station – Located 15 miles southeast of Whitmore's Ferry.
- Visalia – Located 12 miles southeast of Cross Creek Station.
- Packwood Station – Located 12 miles east of Visalia.
- Tule River Station – Located 14 miles south of Packwood Station.
- Fountain Spring Station – Located 14 miles southeast of Tule River Station.
- Mountain House – Located 12 miles south of Fountain Spring Station.
- Posey Creek Station – Located 15 miles southwest of Mountain House, on Posey (Poso) Creek.
- Gordon's Ferry (Kern River Station) – Located 10 miles south of Posey Creek Station on the Kern River just above present-day Bakersfield.
- Kern River Slough Station – Located 12 miles south of Gordons Ferry.
- Sink of Tejon Station – Located 14 miles southwest of Kern River Slough Station.
- Fort Tejon – Located 15 miles southwest of Sink of Tejon Station, north of and below the summit of Tejon Pass.
- Reed's Station – Located 8 miles southeast of Fort Tejon, near, to the south of the summit of the Tejon Pass.
- French John's Station – Located 14 miles east southeast of Reeds Station, in the vicinity of the mouth of Cow Springs Creek Canyon.
- Mud Spring, a later station operating in 1860, 14 miles east from French Johns and 13 miles north from Clayton's Station (formerly Widow Smith's Station). [1]
- Widow Smith's Station (Clayton's Station, Major Gordon's Station) – Located 24 miles from French John's Station, in upper San Francisquito Canyon near Green Valley.
- King's Station – Located 10 miles south of Widow Smith's Station in lower San Francisquito Canyon.
- Hart's Station or Lyons Station – Located 12 miles south of King's Station, in Santa Clarita.
- Lopez Station – Located 8 1/2 miles southeast of Hart's Station, in the San Fernando Valley north of Mission San Fernando Rey de España.
- Cahuenga Station – Located 12 miles southeast of Mission San Fernando, in Cahuenga Pass, of the Santa Monica Mountains. The first station of the 1st Division, it was located 12 miles northwest of Los Angeles.

Source: "List of Butterfield Overland Mail Stations "Itinerary of the Route"" (PDF). New York Times. October 14, 1858.

== List of 2nd Division Stations ==
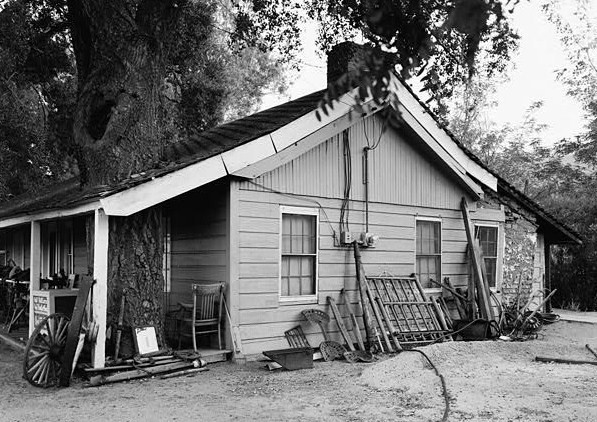
Oak Grove Stage Station in the Laguna Mountains, San Diego County, California.

- Los Angeles – Located 12 miles southeast of Cahuenga Station in the pueblo of Los Angeles. The 2nd Division headquarters was in a brick building, consisting of an office, blacksmith shop, stables and sheds.
- Monte – Located 13 miles east of Los Angeles.
- Rancho San Jose – Located 12 miles east of Monte in present-day Pomona.
- Rancho Santa Ana del Chino – Located 12 miles southeast of Rancho San Jose.
- Temescal Station – Located 20 miles southeast of Rancho Santa Ana del Chino.
- Laguna Grande Station – Located 10 miles southeast of Temescal Station, near present-day Lake Elsinore.
- Alamos or Willow Springs Station – a later station, 11 miles south of Laguna Grande Station.
- Temecula Station – Located 21 miles southeast of Laguna Grande Station.
- Tejungo Station – Located 14 miles east of Temecula Station, near Aguanga
- Oak Grove Stage Station – Located 12 miles southeast of Tejungo Station.
- Warner's Ranch – Located 10 miles southeast of Oak Grove Station.
- San Felipe Station – Located 10 miles southeast of Warner's Ranch, northwest of nearby Scissors Crossing.
- Vallecito Station – Located 18 miles southeast of San Felipe Station.
- Palm Spring Station – Located 9 miles southeast of Vallecito Station at Palm Spring.
- Carrizo Creek Station – Located 9 miles east southeast of Palm Spring Station.
- Sackett's Wells – a later station, located 17 1/2 miles east southeast of Carrizo Creek Station, 15 miles west northwest of Indian Wells.
- Indian Wells Station – Located 32 miles southeast of Carisso Creek, near present day Heber, no water except at station.
- New River Station – a later station, located 15 miles southeast of Indian Wells Station, in Baja California, 14 miles west of Alamo Mocho Station, in present day Mexicali.
- Alamo Mocho Station – Located south of the Mexican border in Baja California, 38 miles east of Indian Wells Station, no water except at station.
- Gardner's Wells Station – a later station, located south of the Mexican border in Baja California, 9 miles east of Alamo Mocho and 9 miles west of Seven Wells.
- Salt or Seven Wells – a later well, located south of the Mexican border in Baja California, 18 miles east of Alamo Mucho.
- Cooke's Wells Station – Located south of the Mexican border in Baja California, 22 miles east of Alamo Mocho Station, no water except at station.
- Pilot Knob Station – Located 18 miles east of Cooke's Wells.
- Fort Yuma Station – Located 10 miles east of Pilot Knob Station.

Source: "List of Butterfield Overland Mail Stations "Itinerary of the Route"" (PDF). New York Times. October 14, 1858.

== See also ==
- Butterfield Overland Mail in Baja California
- Butterfield Overland Mail in New Mexico Territory
- Butterfield Overland Mail in Texas
- Butterfield Overland Mail in Indian Territory
- Butterfield Overland Mail in Arkansas and Missouri
