= Butterfield Overland Mail in Baja California =

The Butterfield Overland Mail route in Baja California was created as a result of an act by the United States Congress on March 3, 1857, and operated until June 30, 1861 as part of the Second Division of the route. Subsequently other stage lines operated along the route until the Southern Pacific Railroad arrived in Yuma, Arizona.

== History ==
Although it lasted only from 1857 to 1861, the Butterfield route made famous one of the most important roads in the early settlement and development of California and most of it was used in one form or another until today. The route from Fort Yuma to Warners Pass followed the Sonora Road, an old Spanish trail from Sonora to San Diego. That Sonora Road linked with the Kearny Trail was used during the Mexican American War by the U.S. Army. During the California Gold Rush the route pioneered by Kearny and Cooke with the addition of a road from Warners Pass to Los Angeles became the Southern Emigrant Trail used by American immigrants, and herds of stock from the east in 1849 and for decades thereafter.

The route that was operated crossed the Colorado River from New Mexico Territory into the Second Division of the Overland Mail's route at Fort Yuma then proceeded along the river to Pilot Knob Station, where it then descended into Baja California, Mexico for 117 miles to avoid the barrier of the Algodones Dunes and to take advantage of stations with the little water available from spring flooding from the Colorado River along the course of the Alamo and New Rivers in the otherwise nearly waterless Colorado Desert. The route then reentered California to Indian Wells between the two Lagunas of the New River.

The route then crossed the level, desolate, Yuha Desert to Sackett's Wells and proceeded through what is now the Carrizo Impact Area, up Carrizo Wash that cut through the Carrizo Badlands, to Carrizo Creek Station and on to the oasis of Vallicito. From there the route ascended northwest into the Peninsular Ranges, via the San Felipe Station in the San Felipe Valley crossing via Warners Pass to Warner's Ranch, then to Temecula Station and on to Los Angeles, headquarters office and terminus of the Second Division.

== Stations ==
- New River Station - a later station in Baja California, located 15 miles southeast of Indian Wells Station, California and 14 miles west of Alamo Mocho, in what is now Mexicali.
- Alamo Mocho Station - an original station, located in Baja California, 38 miles east of Indian Wells Station.
- Gardner's Wells Station - a later station, located in Baja California, 9 miles east of Alamo Mocho and 9 miles west of Seven Wells.
- Salt or Seven Wells - a later station, located in Baja California, 18 miles east of Alamo Mocho.
- Cooke's Wells Station - an original station, located in Baja California, 22 miles east of Alamo Mocho Station, 18 miles west of Pilot Knob Station in California.

== See also ==
- Butterfield Overland Mail in California
- Butterfield Overland Mail in New Mexico Territory
- Butterfield Overland Mail in Texas
- Butterfield Overland Mail in Indian Territory
- Butterfield Overland Mail in Arkansas and Missouri
