= Sackett family =

Fictional characters

The Sackett family is a fictional American family featured in a number of Western novels, short stories, and historical novels by American writer Louis L'Amour.

== Background ==
The novels trace much of the history of the family through individual members of the family as they move across the Atlantic from England, settle in the Appalachians, and then move west to the Great Plains, the Rockies, and California. Unlike novels by such writers as James A. Michener, these stories do not trace the rise and fall of the fortunes of a clan or extended family, but simply tie together significant and minor characters in several of the Western novels.

L'Amour's Sackett family originates in The Fens of Cambridgeshire in East Anglia. The patriarch of the family, Barnabas Sackett, becomes a merchant captain and eventually settles with his wife Abigail (née Tempany) in what will become the borderlands of North Carolina and Tennessee. The family quickly divides into three clans, sired by several of their sons - the "Smoky Mountain Sacketts", "Cumberland Gap Sacketts", and "Clinch Mountain Sacketts". Also, Flatland Sacketts are rarely touched upon in the novels. The Smoky Mountain Sacketts produce some of L'Amour's most memorable and beloved characters, including William Tell "Tell" Sackett and his brothers, Tyrel and Orrin, of the novel Sackett (see below) and others. Orrin was a sheriff, legislator, and eventually senator. Tyrel became a respected rancher and lawman, often simply known as the "Mora Gunfighter" after the town where he settled.

The main theme that runs through most of the Sackett books is that of loyalty to the family and helping the family when beset by foes. "When you step on the toes of one Sackett, they all come running." The deadly Sackett-Higgins feud in Tennessee lasted years. As Tell Sackett notes in the book The Sackett Brand, "The last feud my family taken part in lasted 70 years. The last Higgins died with his gun in his hand, but he died."

The Clinch Mountain boys tend to be rougher. The twins, Nolan and Logan, have hired out their guns and held up a stage or two, but are decent men. Logan came to the aid of Emily Talon, herself a Sackett by birth, in Colorado. Several Clinch Mountain Sacketts also show up in Ride the River to help cousin Echo.

Two other families about whose members L'Amour wrote, and whose families have rubbed shoulders at different times over the three centuries his novels cover, are the Chantry and Talon families, with Borden Chantry and Milo Talon being contemporaries of Tell Sackett. The founders of the three families were contemporaries, as well: Tatton Chantry (the first who used the name Chantry, hero of the novel Fair Blows the Wind) and a famous pirate called Talon (who took the name after the hook he used for a lost hand) were contemporaries of Barnabas Sackett, around the year 1600. Timing is a little vague, as L'Amour never rewrote his earlier novels, and exact years may not match in each novel.

== Sackett (the novel) ==
This is the ninth in the chronology of the Sackett novels and was published in 1961 (Daybreakers was the first to be published in 1960, though it is not the first chronologically). It tells the story of William Tell Sackett, a Union Army veteran who makes his way West in the years following the war, hoping to settle down at the right place as a rancher. He is the main character in several other Sackett books, including Mojave Crossing, The Lonely Men, Treasure Mountain, and The Sackett Brand. He is the brother of Tyrel and Orrin Sackett, who went west to New Mexico in 1867 in The Daybreakers. Tell is also the "ugly duckling" (by his own admission) of the family. However, he does meet a beautiful woman named Ange Kerry in Sackett and falls in love. He loses her when she is brutally murdered in The Sackett Brand. He meets another lady in Treasure Mountain, and presumably marries her. L'Amour has left the ending to the imagination of the reader in this novel.

L'Amour confirmed to Dr. John Sackett that he found the name on Sackett's Well in a place west of Yuma. The desert watering hole was named for cavalry Lt. Delos B. Sackett, who was an Indian fighter in the region before the Civil War. L'Amour has used names and places that roughly parallel a real branch of the Sackett family, but the accounts are fictional.

== The Sackett Companion ==
This nonfiction book, published in 1988 a few months after Louis L'Amour's death, is his personal guide to the Sackett novels, with long lists of characters, locations, ships, weapons, and summaries of each of the novels.

== Sackett's Land (novel) ==
Sackett's Land, published in 1974, is the first novel chronologically of the Sackett novels, taking place around AD 1600 in England (including The Fens and Queen Elizabeth I's London), on the Atlantic Ocean, and the Atlantic Seaboard of North America, particularly in the vicinity of Cape Hatteras. The main character and narrator is Barnabas Sackett, son of mercenary and freeholder Ivo Sackett.

== The Sacketts (TV movie) ==
The Sacketts is a two-part TV movie broadcast on May 15 and 16, 1979, based on the novels The Daybreakers and Sackett. It starred Sam Elliott as Tell Sackett, Tom Selleck as Orrin, and Jeff Osterhage as Tyrel, but also featured parts for Western movie veterans, including Glenn Ford, Gilbert Roland, Jack Elam, Slim Pickens, Pat Buttram, Ben Johnson, and Mercedes McCambridge (as Ma Sackett). It was later released in a cut-down version as The Daybreakers.

== Characters in mainstream novels ==
Barnabas Sackett – The founding member of the Sackett clan. Travels to the New World to escape the warrant of the Queen. Killed by Seneca Indians. Son of Ivo Sackett, soldier and war hero.

Kin-Ring Sackett – First son of Barnabas Sackett, born on a buffalo robe in the heat of battle. First Sackett born in the New World. Married Diana Macklin from Cape Ann.

Brian Sackett – Second son of Barnabas Sackett. Leaves America with his mother and sister to study law in England

Yance Sackett – Third son of Barnabas Sackett. Best known for his quick temper and strength and willingness of action. Founder of Clinch Mountain Branch of Sacketts. Married a girl named Temperance Penney from Cape Ann.

Jublain Sackett (Jubal) – Fourth son of Barnabas Sackett. He was the first Sackett to cross the mountains and see the plains. Known as the quiet one, he is a ghost in the woods. Spends much time away from home and eventually quits the hills of North Carolina for the Rocky Mountains. Marries Itchakomi Ishaia, a "Sun" of the Natchee.

Echo Sackett – Only female member of the Sackett clan to narrate a story. Aunt of Tell, Orrin and Tyrel.

Logan Sackett – Twin brother of Nolan Sackett. Comes from the Clinch Mountain branch of Sacketts and lives up to their reputation. Rough, two-fisted, a man "with the bark on", and with a deserved reputation as being fast with a gun and hell-on wheels in any kind of fight, he has ridden the Outlaw Trail and admits to skirting the dark side of the law on more than one occasion. A lot rougher than Orrin or Tyrel, he is nonetheless a generally decent man. Comes to the aid of his aunt, Emily Talon.

Nolan Sackett – Twin Brother of Logan Sackett. Comes from the Clinch Mountain Branch of Sacketts. Like his brother, he has ridden the outlaw trail. Rough and dangerous, with a hefty reputation as a very bad man to fool around with, he has a strong sense of right and wrong. Wears three pistols, two tied down and one in his coat.

Orlando Sackett (Lando) – Son of Falcon Sackett. One of the last Sacketts to move west. Spends six years in a Mexican prison. Becomes a well-known fist-fighter and boxer.

Falcon Sackett – Father of Orlando Sackett. Formerly captain of a ship. Finds a lost treasure of great value and spends several years in a Mexican prison before finally escaping and being rescued by his son.

Flagan Sackett – Brother of Galloway Sackett. One of the younger Sacketts. Has a strong will to survive. Rarely found far from his brother.

Galloway Sackett – Brother of Flagan Sackett. Tall and handsome, nearly fearless in the face of danger. Known to brave danger and live.

Parmalee Sackett – A "flatland Sackett", Parmalee's family moved down to the richer flatlands while the majority of the clan stayed in the mountains. His affluent lifestyle has not made him weak, as men who have braced him could testify – if they were still above ground.

== Three main characters ==
The three main and most well known characters are the three brothers, sons of Colburn Sackett: Tell, Orrin, and Tyrel. Their father liked his horses fast, his drinks hard, and his preachers hellfire hot, and raised his three sons accordingly. Although they often go long periods without seeing one another, they are completely devoted to one another, and come to each other's aid any time needed, dropping all else in which they might be involved at the time, true to the one binding rule in their lives: "When you hunt one Sackett, you hunt 'em all".

William Tell Sackett (Tell) – Oldest son of Colburn Sackett ("Ride the Dark Trail" section of "The Sackett Companion"). Fought for the Union in the Civil War. A hard, tough, quiet man who wants only to be left alone, it takes very little to anger Tell, and he will fight like a rabid wolf if pushed, as several men have found out – usually, it's the last mistake they make. He's a loner, at home in the High Lonesome, often going years without seeing or communicating with his family back in Tennessee. He takes any job that suits him at the moment, from cowhand to miner, and drifts, rarely staying in one place any great length of time. He's killed several men in his lifetime, is fast and deadly accurate with any kind of gun, as well as the Tinker-made knife he carries. Although outwardly he appears rough, he has a sound, strong moral character, never forgetting his father's rule of "...always ride on the side of the law, never against it". In the film adaptations he is portrayed by Sam Elliott.

Orrin Sackett – Second son of Colburn Sackett. Orrin likes people and tries to see the best of them. Handsome, witty, and smart, he likes to believe that most people like him, however he can be a bit naive at times. Good with a gun, and always ready with a smile and a quote, he's strong willed and completely devoted to his family. He is calm during a fight, never getting excited or losing his head, a trait that is in all three brothers. Married twice, he killed a member of the Higgins family during a gunfight, only to have Long Higgins come after him on his wedding day. Orrin was unarmed, and his new wife jumped in front of him as Higgins fired, killing her. Orrin's brother Tyrel killed Higgins, then left Tennessee to avoid further problems. Orrin left soon after, promising his mother they'd send for her. He then married the treacherous Laura Pritts who tried to use him as part of her bigoted father's land grab in Santa Fe against the settled Mexican landowners.

After her fraud is exposed, Laura attempts to lure William Tell into Apache country to rescue her nonexistent son with Orrin, a plan which fails. Always honest and straightforward, the fights in which Orrin usually finds himself a part are generally started by his steadfast and unwavering attitude toward what he believes in strongly. A smooth talker, Orrin has no problem making friends, especially female. He was elected sheriff of Santa Fe, New Mexico, where his reputation as a man fair to all ethnicities, Hispanic and Anglo alike, gained him respect.

In one of the novels, Orrin's ex-wife Laura Pritts sends men to kill him. As one of his brothers relates it, "Seems like they'd been told they were hunting a lawyer. Well, there's lawyers and there's lawyers, just like there was a dentist named Doc Holliday." The man died. In the film adaptations, Orrin is portrayed by Tom Selleck.

Tyrel Sackett – Third son of Colburn Sackett. He idolizes his brothers Tell and Orrin. Known throughout the West as the Mora Gunfighter, and by his brothers as the "mean one" or the "black sheep", Tyrel is the fastest with a gun of the three brothers. Wherever Tyrel goes, he seems to attract trouble, and sooner or later someone always tries to outdraw him, but never succeeds – by his own admission: "Till the day I hung 'em up, I was the fastest gun alive." Compassionate to a fault, his sense of morals never leaves him and stands as a steady guide on his way west. In Santa Fe he is forced to kill Tom Sunday, a close friend who'd gone bad after losing what he saw as his last chance to start a new life, which affects him deeply. Naive where women are concerned, Tyrel often seems like a shy schoolboy when facing a pretty girl. He marries Drusilla Alvarado, the beautiful granddaughter of a rich Spanish don. In the film adaptations, Tyrel is portrayed by Jeff Osterhage.

== Trivia ==
The 1982 made-for-TV movie The Shadow Riders was based upon another Louis L'Amour novel and stars Sam Elliott (Dal Traven), Tom Selleck (Mac Traven), and Jeff Osterhage (Jesse Traven) in similar roles to those they play in The Sacketts. However, neither the novel nor the movie is connected with the Sackett saga. The movie was made primarily to capitalize on the success of The Sacketts.

== List of Sackett stories by L'Amour ==
Louis L'Amour wrote a number of fiction novels telling of the settlement of much of North America revolving around a fictional family named Sackett. The first of these books was The Daybreakers, which introduced the Sackett family to fans of Wild West fiction. Over his life, L'Amour expanded his tales of the Sacketts to include numerous members of the Sackett clan, as well as members of the Talon and Chantry families, who over the generations have various relationships with the Sacketts. In The Sackett Companion, L'Amour described The Man from the Broken Hills as being a Talon book. He wanted the Talon and Chantry books to be seen as series of books separate from the Sackett books. Yet, at the same time, he had already written and planned future stories establishing various connections between the three families. In so doing, he had already begun creating a single saga that was built around the Sacketts and reflected how L'Amour wanted to describe the settling of the American frontiers in an entertaining, and yet a relatively accurate historical and cultural way with bigger-than-life characters. Included in the saga are several novels that are not specifically Sackett, Talon, or Chantry tales, but rather outliers where L'Amour managed to weave a Sackett touch into the story. Examples of these outliers are Bendigo and Passin' Through. The following is a suggested chronological listing of the 32 novels that make up this saga of the Sacketts and their kin.

Following each title is the year in which the book is most likely set. In some books, L'Amour has his protagonist explicitly give the year. In others, the year can be determined by some historical reference used by the author, such as in Chancy, when Chancy tells of meeting Wild Bill Hickok in Abilene. According to Wikipedia, historical records show that Hickok was marshal of Abilene only in 1871, which makes the setting of Chancy to be 1871. Other books are given their place in the chronology based on references by characters or events that indicate a book's place in the chronology.

The names that follows each title listed below identifies the main protagonist in the novel. The years in which the novels are set are given after the protagonist name followed by the justification for the year assigned as the setting for the novel.

- Fair Blows the Wind – Tattan Chantry – 1590 (Based on the reference in Chapter 23 to the Battle of Ivry when Chantry is taken captive shortly before leaving for America when the story initially begins.)
- Sackett's Land – Barnabas Sackett – 1599 (In Chapter 1, Barnabas tells the reader the year is 1599.)
- To the Far Blue Mountains – Barnabas Sackett – 1600 (In Chapter 1, Barnabas has returned to the Fens in England, where he comments that nothing has changed "now almost a year later", which indicates it is one year after Sackett's Land or 1600. Also included are his four sons, Kin Ring, Yance, Jubal, and Brian, and his daughter Noelle.)
- Jubal Sackett – Jubal Sackett – 1630 (In Chapter 13, Jubal Sackett tells the reader that his father "had been in America most of 30 years". This would indicate that Barnabas died in 1629, which makes this story take place circa 1629. Although nothing explicit is in the story regarding the year, it appears reasonable that this tale may have been intended to be set in an approximate time concurrent with his two brothers in The Warrior's Path.)
- The Warrior's Path – Kin Ring Sackett and Yance Sackett – 1630 (In Chapter 1, Kin tells the reader, "This was 1630...")
- The Ferguson Rifle – Ronan Chantry – 1805 (The Ferguson rifle was named after Major Patrick Ferguson, who was a real person who was killed in 1780 at the Battle of Kings Mountain. Ronan tells the reader that Major Ferguson gave the rifle to him shortly before being killed. Since Ferguson was killed in 1780 and Ronan claims that he has had the rifle for 25 years, this would make the year of this tale to be 1805.)
- Rivers West – Jean Talon – 1821 (In Chapter 3, Jean Talon makes an observation about "political windbags" being plentiful in the "year of 1821", which identifies the year for this tale as 1821.)
- Ride the River – Echo Sackett – 1840 (In Chapter 3, the author tells the reader that James White, the shyster lawyer, had an annual income that was a good income for 1840. Dorian Chantry plays a major role. Cameos include Finian Chantry and Clinch Mountain Sacketts Trulove, Macon, and Mordecai. References are made to Daubenny Sackett and Ethan Sackett.)
- Bendigo Shafter – Bendigo Shafter – 1866 (In Chapter 29 when the settlers have been in their town for two years, Bendigo refers to the nomination of Ulysses S. Grant to be President. According to britannica.com, Grant was nominated and elected in 1868. Since the story began two year previous, the story would have begun in 1866. Ethan Sackett plays a major role. "Bendigo Shafter" won a U.S. National Book Award in the one-year category Western.
- Over on the Dryside- Owen Chantry – 1866 (In Chapter 3, Doby Kernohan tells the reader, "In the year of 1866, the fast draw was an unheard of thing...)
- The Iron Marshal – Tom Shanaghy – 1866 (In Chapter 1, Shanaghy recalls his arrival in New York where he meets John Morrisey. Morrisey is another of those actual historical figures often found in L'Amour's books. Shanaghy is told that Morrisey "was" the heavyweight bare-knuckle champion. Shanaghy recalls working for Morrisey for 12 years, which would place the time about 1866. It would not likely be later because Morrisey was elected to the US Congress in 1867. It contains the smallest Sackett reference of all with no specific Sackett identified. It just has a reference to a "man in Tennessee by the name of Sackett".)
- Booty for a Badman – Tell Sackett – Sometime between 1866 and 1869. A short story. It appears to have been an introduction to Tell Sackett.
- "The Courting of Griselda" – Tell Sackett – Soon after Booty for a Badman, but prior to Sackett. A short story.
- The Daybreakers – Tyrel Sackett and Orrin Sackett – 1867 to 1872 (In Chapter 3, Tyrel tells the reader when they leave Abilene, "In 1867, the Santa Fe Trail was an old trail..." Later, in Chapter 14, Tyrel replies to a comment from Tom Sunday that it had been five years since they had met. In Chapter 3, Tyrel refers to his brother Tell.)
- The Man From the Broken Hills – Milo Talon – 1868 (In Chapter 1 of this book, Milo states that most of the last three years he had been riding the Outlaw Trail. This indicates that this story takes place three years after the Civil War or Milo would have given more history as he does in Milo Talon, when he talks of riding shotgun for a stage and working as a town marshal. In Chapter 1, Milo mentions his brother Barnabas, who he says is named after the patriarch Barnabas Sackett.)
- Lando – Orlando Sackett – 1868 to 1874 (Near the beginning of Chapter 3, Lando declares the year to be 1868. He spends six years as a prisoner in Mexico. A major role is played by Lando's father Falcon Sackett.)
- Dark Canyon – Gaylord Riley – 1869 (In Chapter 9, when Tell Sackett makes a cameo appearance, he is asked if he is kin to the Sacketts of Mora. This indicates that the year for this story is just prior to 1870 or 1871, since Tyrel and Orrin were fairly well established in Mora by then.)
- Chancy – Otis Tom Chancy – 1871 (In Chapter 4, the cattle drive reaches Abilene, KS, where they find that Wild Bill Hickok is marshal. According to his biography in Wikipedia, Hickok was marshal of Abilene only in 1871. In Chapter 1, Gates tells Chancy of a man named Sackett, who rode through Texas telling them of a green valley out west, which would fit with Tell Sackett's timeline. Chancy then reveals to the reader that he is a distant relative to the Sacketts.)
- Catlow Abijah Catlow and Ben Cownan – 1871 (In Chapter 3, Ben tells Catlow to drive his herd to Abilene, where Wild Bill Hickok is marshal. According to his biography in Wikipedia, Hickok was marshal in Abilene in 1871. In Chapters 15 and 22, references are made to Sacketts in New Mexico, which would have been Tyrel and Orrin.)
- Mustang Man – Nolan Sackett – 1871 (Information in Chapters 14 and 15 place this novel after the Sacketts arrive in Mora and prior to the end of The Daybreakers, and prior to "Mojave Crossing" and "The Sackett Brand". In Chapter 14 of "Mustang Man", Nolan rides into a camp and, while negotiating a horse trade, tells the campers that he is headed for Mora to visit some kin named Sackett. The camp riders state that they have heard of the Sacketts in Mora but do not make any reference to Tyrel as the Mora gunfighter, which could indicate that this book takes place prior to 1872, which is when Tyrel has the big gunfight with Tom Sunday and becomes known as the Mora gunfighter. In Chapter 15, Nolan tells Ollie Shaddock that he does not know Tyrel or Orrin Sackett, but has heard of them. He would later join Tyrel and Orrin in the final shootout in The Sackett Brand. Since he does not mention to Ollie Shaddock anything about knowing Tell, this would imply that this tale also takes place prior to Mojave Crossing in which Tell first meets up with Nolan as indicated in The Sackett Brand, because in The Sackett Brand, Tell informs the reader that he has met Nolan before when Nolan helped with a serious situation told about in Mojave Crossing. Considering that the camp riders in Chapter 14 do not refer to Tyrel as the Mora Gunfighter, it seems reasonable to assume that Mustang Man is set in 1871, prior to 1872 when he had the big gunfight that earned him that reputation.)
- Sackett – William Tell Sackett – 1873 (Tell leaves Texas after killing a man named Bigelow in a gunfight. He joins a trail herd headed north for Montana. From there, he heads for Mora, New Mexico, to find Tyrel and Orrin. Along the way, he stumbles on an old gold mine. When Tell finds his mine, he says it is late spring. The next year, he returns to mine in late spring and discovers Ange and her grandfather's grave. The year 1874 on the gravestone is given in Chapter 8. Tell tells the reader that 1874 is the year before his discovery of the grave. Considering his travels to Montana and towards New Mexico, the story began in 1873. This is the first novel about Tell Sackett.)
- Mojave Crossing – Tell Sackett – 1876 (The year of 1876 is based on the novel Sackett ending in the winter of 1875. This novel also includes once again the appearance of Nolan Sackett from the Clinch Mountains. It is also the first introduction of a Trelawney girl.)
- The Sackett Brand – Tell Sackett −1877 (This novel is set in 1877 based on the date that Tell puts on Ange's grave marker. It covers a period of time of only about 40 days late April and May. Sacketts who show up in minor roles include Lando with his friend the Tinker, Nolan, Tyrel, Orrin, Falcon, Flagan, Galloway, and Parmalee.)
- The Skyliners – Flagan and Galloway Sackett – 1877 (This novel takes place right after the story told in The Sackett Brand. It covers a period of time of about three months from about June through August. In addition, Flagan and Galloway run into Wyatt Earp and Bat Masterson in Dodge City. Biographies in Wikipedia for these two place Earp and Masterson both in Dodge City in 1877.
- Galloway – Flagan and Galloway Sackett – 1877 – (Based on the timing of The Sackett Brand, The Skyliners, and Milo Talon, Galloway would have taken place in late 1877. The Skyliners appears to take place immediately after The Sackett Brand, which would indicate that Galloway takes place after The Skyliners. This is never directly stated though, and none of the events of "The Skyliners" are mentioned despite the degree of prominence they brought to Flagan and Galloway. This has led to alternate theories that Galloway is set earlier and that Flagan and Galloway's ranch failed, causing them to return to Tennessee just before the events of The Skyliners (although this would not explain the absence of Galloway's wolf). Regardless of this, Galloway apparently takes place prior to Milo Talon because Milo Talon mentions a cousin who is followed around by a wolf. The latest that Milo Talon can take place is also 1877, which places Galloway in 1877, as well. It covers a period of about 70 days, which would put it in the September and October timeframe. Parmalee Sackett and Logan Sackett have cameos.)
- Milo Talon – Milo Talon – 1877 – (This novel has to be after Galloway, because in Chapter 3, Milo mentions a cousin with a wolf-dog that follows him around. This would be Flagan in Galloway. In addition, this would place this story about 12 years after the Civil War, because in Chapter 2, the reader is told that Milo is almost 30, which indicates that he is no older than 29. If he joined the army at 17 to fight in the Civil War and he is 29, this is 12 years after he joined the army. If he did not join the army until the last year of the war, it would make the latest that Milo Talon could take place as 1877, while still being after Galloway. If the year were after 1877, Milo could not have fought in the Civil War. If the year were prior to 1877 or he is less than 29, it would force the placement of Milo Talon earlier than Galloway, which would mean no cousin followed by a wolf would exist. Also mentioned is Packet Sackett, who was small but feisty and a dead shot.)
- The Lonely Men – Tell Sackett – 1877 or 1878 (Since The Sackett Brand was set in 1877, a reasonable estimate for this novel would be late 1877 or early 1878, since Tell refers to injuries received in The Sackett Brand. Mention is made of Tyrel and Orrin.)
- Ride the Dark Trail – Logan Sackett – 1878 or 79 (1878 appears to be a reasonable year for this novel, although it could be later. The story has to follow Milo Talon and The Sackett Brand, because Milo has still not returned home and Logan makes reference to Tell's problems in the Tonto Basin as told in The Sackett Brand. Logan is the twin brother of Nolan from the Clinch Mountains. A major role is played by Em Talon nee Sackett. Cameos are made by Milo and Barnabas Talon.)
- Treasure Mountain – Tell Sackett – 1878 (1878 seems a reasonable year in which to set this novel. First, based on the characters and their familiarity with each other, it is definitely after "The Sackett Brand" in 1877. Second, its inclusion of Flagan Sackett in a minor role and settled in Colorado indicates that it is also set after "Galloway" in 1878. However, it is still in the 1870s as Tell makes a comment in Chapter 2 about the New Orleans of the 1870s, which gives reason to place this novel no later than in 1879. But, 1879 would be difficult because Logan is major character in Lonely on the Mountain, which is likely set in 1879. Major roles are played by Orrin Sackett and the Tinker.)
- Lonely on the Mountain – Tell, Tyrel, and Orrin Sackett – circa 1879 – (1879 seems the most logical time for this novel. This story also starts in the spring, which would make squeezing it into 1880 difficult, because of Tyrel's involvement in Borden Chantry. The inclusion of a real historical figure, Louis Riel, makes placing the story after 1885 difficult, as Riel was hanged that year during what was called the Second Resistance. It could not be during the First Resistance, which took place from 1869 to 1870. In addition, the story makes reference to a Fort Garry. Wikipedia indicates that Fort Garry was demolished between 1881 and 1884. Based on the history of Fort Garry, 1879 seems to be a reasonable fit for this novel.)
- Borden Chantry – Borden Chantry – 1879 (In Chapter 18, Borden asks Tyrel Sackett about unsolved murders in Mora seven or eight years previously. As Tyrel was a deputy sheriff at the end of The Daybreakers in 1872, Borden Chantry likely is taking place seven or eight years after The Daybreakers or around 1879 or 1880. As Tyrel Sackett was involved in Treasure Mountain set in 1878, the year 1879 seems a reasonable fit. A cameo is made by Tyrel Sackett.)
- Passin' Through – Passin' Through – 1881 – (In Chapter 8, Passin' tells Ms. Hollyrood that "1881 has started off slow..." This gives the year for this novel. This is another story without an active role played by a Sackett unless Passin' Through is himself actually a Sackett. In Chapter 10, Ms. Hollyrood tells of a shooting incident years before that involved Parmalee Sackett, who left shortly thereafter to help a relative who was in trouble. This was likely a reference to Tell Sackett in The Sackett Brand. In Chapter 23, a young woman named Matty reveals that her last name is Higgins and that she is a Clinch Mountain Higgins. Early on in the Sackett saga, readers learned that the Sacketts had a long-running feud with the Higgins. L'Amour possibly had Matty make this statement because she believed it would mean something to a Sackett.)
- Son of a Wanted Man – Mike Bastian – 1882 (Significant cameos are made by Tyrel Sackett and Borden Chantry. Based on Tyrel's timeline, 1882 seems like the earliest year in which it could be set.)
- North to the Rails – Tom Chantry −1906 (Tom is the son of Borden Chantry. In this book, the reader learns that Borden Chantry was town marshal for six years, which indicates that he was killed in 1886. No specific year is given for this novel. However, the maps at the front of the book show the Oklahoma Panhandle to be Indian Territory. Since Oklahoma became a state in 1907, it would seem the latest setting for this novel would be 1906.)

== See also ==
- Sackett (surname) has information about the surname of real families found primarily in the United Kingdom, United States, and Australia, plus links to Wikipedia pages of notable Sacketts.
