= Volta, California =

- Census-designated place
- Location within California Location within the United States
- Coordinates: 37°05′51″N 120°55′34″W
- Country: United States
- State: California
- County: Merced

Area
  - Total: 4.434 sq mi (11.484 km^{2})
  - Land: 4.370 sq mi (11.318 km^{2})
  - Water: 0.064 sq mi (0.165 km^{2}) 1.44%
- Elevation: 105 ft (32 m)

Population (2020)
  - Total: 366
  - Density: 83.8/sq mi (32.3/km^{2})
- Time zone: UTC-8 (Pacific (PST))
  - Summer (DST): UTC-7 (PDT)
- ZIP Code: 93635 (Los Banos
- Area code: 209
- GNIS feature IDs: 1660110; 2583179

Volta is an unincorporated community and census-designated place (CDP) in Merced County, California, United States. It is located 5 miles (8 km) west-northwest of Los Banos at an elevation of 105 feet (32 m). The population was 366 at the 2020 census, up from 246 at the 2010 census.

From 1858 to 1861, Lone Willow Station a swing station for the Butterfield Overland Mail, was located east of here on the west bank of Mud Slough, 18 miles east of the St. Louis Ranch Station and 13 miles northwest of Temple's Ranch station.

A post office operated at Volta from 1890 to 1972. The name was from the Volta Improvement Company.

== Geography ==
Volta is in southwestern Merced County, between Los Banos to the southeast and Santa Nella to the west. It is on the western side of California's Central Valley.

According to the United States Census Bureau, the CDP covers an area of 4.4 square miles (11 km^{2}), of which 98.56% is land and 1.44% is water.

== Demographics ==
Historical population
Census	Pop.	Note	%±
2010	246		—
2020	366		48.8%
U.S. Decennial Census; 1850–1870 1880-1890; 1900 1910 1920; 1930 1940 1950; 1960 1970 1980; 1990 2000 2010

Volta first appeared as a census designated place in the 2010 U.S. census.

The 2020 United States census reported that Volta had a population of 366. The population density was 83.8 inhabitants per square mile (32.4/km^{2}). The racial makeup of Volta was 157 (42.9%) White, 2 (0.5%) African American, 3 (0.8%) Native American, 1 (0.3%) Asian, 0 (0.0%) Pacific Islander, 138 (37.7%) from other races, and 65 (17.8%) from two or more races. Hispanic or Latino of any race were 252 persons (68.9%).

The whole population lived in households. There were 98 households, out of which 48 (49.0%) had children under the age of 18 living in them, 64 (65.3%) were married-couple households, 5 (5.1%) were cohabiting couple households, 19 (19.4%) had a female householder with no partner present, and 10 (10.2%) had a male householder with no partner present. 13 households (13.3%) were one person, and 10 (10.2%) were one person aged 65 or older. The average household size was 3.73. There were 80 families (81.6% of all households).

The age distribution was 113 people (30.9%) under the age of 18, 46 people (12.6%) aged 18 to 24, 91 people (24.9%) aged 25 to 44, 70 people (19.1%) aged 45 to 64, and 46 people (12.6%) who were 65 years of age or older. The median age was 28.9 years. For every 100 females, there were 96.8 males.

There were 110 housing units at an average density of 25.2 units per square mile (9.7 units/km^{2}), of which 98 (89.1%) were occupied. Of these, 56 (57.1%) were owner-occupied, and 42 (42.9%) were occupied by renters.
