= Willow station =

Willow station may refer to:

== Transportation ==
=== Railway ===
- Willow Grove station, a SEPTA commuter station in Willow Grove, Pennsylvania
- Willow River station, a railway station in Willow River, British Columbia
- Willow Springs station (Illinois), a Metra commuter station in Willow Springs, Illinois
- Willow Tree railway station, a railway station in New South Wales, Australia
- Willow Tree station (LIRR), a former Long Island Rail Road commuter station in Queens, New York
- Newton-le-Willows railway station, a railway station in Newton-le-Willows, England

=== Transit ===
- Willow (CRT station), a former Chicago Rapid Transit Company station
- Willow station (PAAC), a Port Authority of Allegheny County light rail station in Castle Shannon, Pennsylvania
- Willow Lawn station, a GRTC bus rapid transit station in Richmond, Virginia
- Willow Street station, a Los Angeles County Metro light rail station
- Willow Creek/Southwest 185th Avenue Transit Center, a MAX light rail station and transit center in Hillsboro, Oregon

== Military ==
- Naval Air Station Joint Reserve Base Willow Grove, a former Naval Air Station in Montgomery County, Pennsylvania
- Willow Run Air Force Station, a former USAF station that was to the east of Willow Run Airport in Michigan

== Other ==
- Willow (TV channel), an American sports channel devoted to airing overseas cricket events
- Willow Beach Gauging Station, a gauging station in the Lake Mead National Recreation Area, Nevada
- Willow Springs Station, a former Butterfield Overland Mail changing station in Riverside County, California
- Lone Willow Station, a former settlement in Merced County, California
