= Anshei Glen Wild Synagogue =

Orthodox synagogue in Glen Wild, New York

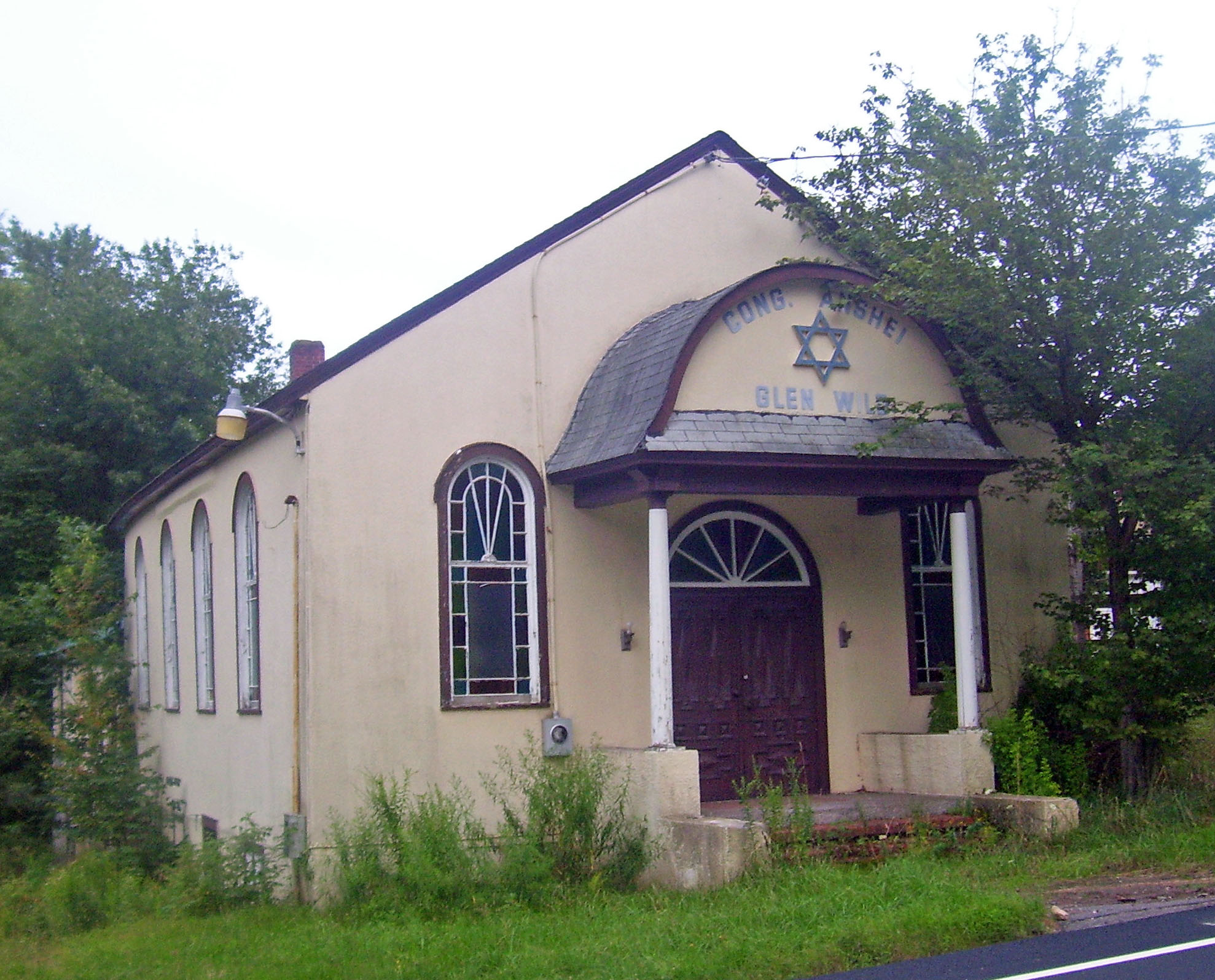
- West profile and north elevation, 2008

- Location in New York

Religion
- Affiliation: Orthodox Judaism (former)
- Ecclesiastical or organisational status: Synagogue (1923 – 2013); Art gallery and performance space (since 2013)
- Status: Closed (as a place of worship)

Location
- Location: Glen Wild Road, Glen Wild, Sullivan County, New York
- Country: United States
- Coordinates: 41°39′00″N 74°35′19″W

Architecture
- Founder: Jaffe family
- General contractor: Jim Couch and Sons
- Established: 1913 (as a congregation)
- Groundbreaking: 1921
- Completed: 1923

Specifications
- Direction of façade: West
- Materials: Concrete; stucco
- Anshei Glen Wild Synagogue
- U.S. National Register of Historic Places
- NRHP reference No.: 98001618
- Added to NRHP: 1999

Anshei Glen Wild Synagogue is a small former Orthodox Jewish synagogue located on Glen Wild Road, Sullivan County Route 58, in the unincorporated community of Glen Wild, New York, in the United States. The congregation was founded in 1913 by a local family and never had its own rabbi. The former synagogue is preserved virtually intact from the time of its construction in 1923. The building was listed on the National Register of Historic Places in 1999.

Since 2013, the former synagogue has been used as an art gallery and performance space.

== Building ==
The former synagogue is a single-story three-by-four-bay building on a concrete foundation with stucco siding and a gabled roof shingled in asphalt. A four-bay addition projects from the rear. The west (front) facade features a porch with bell-shaped roof supported by two round wooden columns rising from a concrete stoop. The porch's entablature features the name of the synagogue and a Star of David. Both sides and the original rear wall feature large round-arched windows with colored and opaque glass.

The ornately paneled wooden doors, surmounted by a colored fanlight, open onto a small vestibule. The remainder of the original block is used for the sanctuary, a barrel-vaulted square room. A chandelier hangs from the intersection of two iron tie rods at the bottom of the vault. The floor layout of the sanctuary follows Orthodox tradition, with the centrally located bimah surrounded by pews with curved end panels on three sides, all of which face the Torah ark at the rear. Two or three have been set aside as the women's gallery.

Turned wooden posts on the elaborately decorated ark support a pedimented roof, where two carved, gilt Lions of Judah hold a scroll with the Ten Commandments topped by a large gilt crown. Both the ark platform and bimah are made of paneled wood with square posts.

== History ==
As in other areas of Sullivan County, Jews began coming to the region, first to vacation and later to stay, around the turn of the 20th century. Among the early arrivals to the Glen Wild area, in 1904, were Simon Jaffe and his family, of Lithuanian descent like other Jews in the area. Since he had been a shochet, or ritual animal slaughterer, he helped establish the small congregation, of 13 members at first, in 1913.

Worshipers met in his house for over a decade before they began to talk about building a synagogue. A small parcel of land was acquired, and cornerstones were laid in 1921. Local contractor Jim Couch and Sons, neighbors of the Jaffes, handled the construction. The finished building, completed in 1923, reflects some characteristics of Sullivan County's Christian churches such as the gabled roof, but the window treatments and stucco finish link it to other synagogues of the period in the area, such as the former Hebrew Congregation of Mountaindale and the South Fallsburg Hebrew Association Synagogue.

In 1955 a congregant, Louis Rosenblatt, donated money for the construction of the rear wing, to be used as a social hall. This has been the only change made to the building since 1923.

Since Anshei Glen Wild was a small congregation, it never hired its own rabbi. Simon Jaffe, a schoolteacher, conducted services and taught congregants' children Hebrew. His family continued to maintain the synagogue, although services were infrequent. The two dozen members focused much of their efforts on maintaining the nearby cemetery.

Around 2013 the synagogue was bought by Mike Osterhout, an artist, and converted into an art gallery and performance space. Osterhout also owns the nearby heritage-listed Glen Wild Methodist Church, built in 1867, and renamed by Osterhout as the Church of the Little Green Man.

== See also ==
- Anshei Israel Synagogue, a similar small rural synagogue in Lisbon, Connecticut
- National Register of Historic Places listings in Sullivan County, New York
