= Murder of Maya Millete =

2021 event in California, United States

Maya Millete
- Maya Tabalanza
- Born: Maya Tabalanza; May 1, 1981; Philippines
- Disappeared: January 7, 2021 (aged 39); Chula Vista, California
- Status: Missing for 5 years, 10 months and 14 days
- Occupations: Civilian employee, United States Navy
- Known for: Missing individual, husband's murder conviction
- Height: 5 ft 2 in (1.57 m)
- Spouse: Larry Millete
- Children: 3
- Parent(s): Pablito and Noemi Tabalanza
- Relatives: Maricris Drouaillet (sister)

Maya "May" Millete (born May 1, 1981) is a Filipino American woman who disappeared on January 7, 2021, in Chula Vista, California. A police investigation into her disappearance occurred. Her husband, Larry, was charged with Maya's murder in October 2021; his trial began in May 2026. Larry was convicted of first-degree murder on July 9, 2026. As of July 9, 2026, Maya remains missing. On November 2, 2026, Larry was sentenced to 25 years to life in prison.

== Background ==
Maya Millete, a Filipino American, was a civilian employee of the United States Navy; prior to June 2020, Maya worked at Southwest Regional Maintenance Center as a contract specialist. She last worked as a contract specialist for the Naval Information Warfare Center. Millete was born in the Philippines. Her family immigrated to Hawaii in 1995, when Maya was 13. She was then raised in Honolulu. She graduated from Admiral Arthur W. Radford High School, later attending and graduating from University of Hawaiʻi at Mānoa. Maya met Larry Millete in high school, after he had moved to Hawaii from San Diego with his family following a juvenile gang related assault arrest in 1997. They later married and he served in the United States Navy for five years. (Note: He was enlisted from 1999 to 2005 and served as a corpsman; during his service and following discharge, he worked as an optician. He is not a combat veteran. He most recently worked at Naval Medical Training Center San Diego. (Note: During the 2026 trial it was revealed that while in the Navy, and while married to Maya, Larry had an extramarital affair.)) They moved to San Diego, and had three children. They lived in a house in the San Miguel Ranch area of Chula Vista. In late 2020 their relationship deteriorated, and Larry allegedly became increasingly controlling and paranoid, while suspecting Maya was having an affair. (Note: Later investigation revealed that Maya was having an affair with a man named James "Jamey" Laird.) (Note: Laird's wife at the time of the affair was pregnant as well as a San Diego County Sheriff's deputy; they have since divorced. (Note: During the 2026 trial, it was testified that Liard's wife had a conversation with Larry on either 4th or 5th of January 2021, that Laird later admitted to his wife about the affair with Maya after their first child was born. They later had another child, and the divorce occurred in 2024.) Laird was Maya's co-worker. (Note: During the 2026 trial, it was testified that Laird was Maya's subordinate. Testimony also was made that Laird's wife had suspected the affair in February 2020, and Laird's mother-in-law reported the affair to his employer as it was against its policies. Other testimony during the trial stated that on the date when Maya went missing, Laird's wife went into labor. Laird later lied to multiple people, including his wife and law enforcement.) The affair resulted in Maya becoming pregnant, who then had an abortion to end the pregnancy.) (Note: During the 2026 trial, members of Maya's family testified that Larry wanted to "get rid of" Maya's boyfriend.) By December 2020, Maya had resolved to divorce Larry, and was taking steps to formalize the separation. (Note: Later investigation revealed Larry had attempted to utilize psychics, spellcasters, and spirit channelers to have his relationship with Maya mended; (Note: During the 2026 trial, one of those testifying was described by media as a "spellcaster", who called what they did as "physical prayer", who was contacted by Larry via Fiverr. Prosecuters claimed that Larry asked for hexes be placed on Maya's affair partner and the affair partner's unborn child.) he later requested that she experience bodily harm so she would be dependent on him and would not leave.) (Note: During the 2026 trial multiple witnesses testified that they encouraged Maya to improve her marriage with Larry.) A friend of Maya's alleged that Larry had physically abused her, and that she feared for the safety of their children. Another friend had offered a condo safe house to her because of fears for her safety.

== Disappearance and searches ==
On January 7, 2021, Millete was last seen at the family's house around 5 in the evening; she had called a divorce attorney earlier that day. The following day, Larry Millete was observed on video backing their black Lexus GX 460 into a position where the rear of the vehicle could not be seen on camera. Larry claimed that he drove the Lexus to Solana Beach with one of their children that day; the vehicle was later impounded by the Chula Vista Police Department. (Note: Another vehicle the family owned, a black Jeep, was also impounded.) (Note: During the 2026 trial, it was testified that Larry asked a neighbor for a quote to repair paint damage to the Lexus on 9 January 2021.) Maya's relatives came to check on her on January 8 but were told by Larry that she had remained locked in a room by herself since the previous day. When they returned the following morning and insisted Larry open the door, they found the room empty with no sign of her. Millete's sister, Maricris Drouaillet, then filed a missing persons report with the Chula Vista Police Department. On January 9, Larry spoke to a neighbor saying that he took the Lexus to Anza-Borrego Desert State Park, and asked the neighbor to detail the vehicle. Maya Millete is presumed to be dead.

On January 13, 2021, volunteers searched Mount San Miguel Park for Millete. On January 23, 2021, investigators conducted a search warrant at Millete's home, searching for clues or any evidence that would point to the cause of her disappearance or possible whereabouts. In January, Maya's relatives hired a private investigator to assist in finding her. On February 5, 2021, the Chula Vista Police Department and Millete's family held a briefing to encourage the public to look for her. Skeletal remains were found in Orange County that were thought to be Millete's remains, but this was proven false, and the remains were then said to be that of a male. Later on the remains were proven to be animal bones.

Additional searches for Maya Millete were conducted by volunteers in February at the Glamis sand dunes, March near Lower Otay Lake, and May in National City and at an abandoned golf course in Chula Vista. In late July, at an event celebrating Filipino-American Friendship Day, an effort was made to increase awareness of the continued search for Maya. In late October, searches were conducted near the Salton Sea, Fish Creek, and Glamis. Up until his arrest in late October, Larry Millete had not participated in any of the searches. In early November, searchers returned to Glamis sand dunes; the area of Imperial Gables was also searched in November. Searches for Maya continued to occur weekly through December. On 8 January 2022, a prayer vigil was held commemorating a year of Maya Millete being missing, and searches continued in January including the use of ground penetrating drones. Searches for Maya continued into 2022, with searches occurring at least in August, and September. At least one search for Maya occurred in 2023 in Chula Vista.

== Audio recording ==
Eight loud bangs can be heard in an audio recording from January 7, 2021, at approximately 8:30 p.m. in the vicinity of Millete's Chula Vista residence. The audio recording, which was released to law enforcement and the public, corresponds to video surveillance footage that was not released to the public due to privacy concerns brought by the neighbor who provided the video footage and audio recording. At around 10 p.m. audio was recorded on a neighbor's camera of the Millete children playing outside on a cold night in their backyard.

== National media attention ==
On April 6, 2021, Maya's disappearance was aired on Good Morning America. The attorney for Millete's family, her sister, and her brother-in-law appeared on Dr. Phil on April 12, 2021. In an article by Dateline NBC, the case of Maya's disappearance was included among 169 other missing individuals. On February 19, 2022, more than a year since Millete's disappearance, CBS network’s true-crime series 48 Hours aired an hour-long report on her case, hoping the national exposure would lead to some answers.

== Prosecution of Larry Millete ==
In an interview in January 2021, Larry admitted to having arguments with Maya in 2020. Beginning on February 3, 2021, Larry hired an attorney and stopped being cooperative with police. In April 2021, it was reported that Larry wanted to hire someone to kill the man he suspected Maya had an affair with. In May 2021, Larry's remaining firearms were seized by the police based on a gun violence restraining order (GVRO) due to the unsafe environment they posed to his children; his children reportedly knew the passcode to his gun safe and a photo was presented showing his 4-year-old son standing on a table, surrounded by firearms.

In late July 2021, Larry was named a person of interest by the Chula Vista Police Department. In September 2021, with visitation of the children still in dispute, Larry made accusations against members of Maya's side of the family, in an attempt to justify the lack of visitation. On Tuesday October 19, 2021, Larry Millete was arrested and charged with the murder of his wife Maya. During a press conference announcing the arrest San Diego County District Attorney Summer Stephan stated that the body of Maya Millete had not yet been found as of the time of the arrest. The arrest came after 67 search warrants had been executed, and 87 interviews had been conducted. Following the arrest, the Millete home was searched again, a vial containing a chemical found in hemlock was found. After Larry's arrest, he remained in custody and was held without bond. On Thursday October 21, 2021, Larry pleaded not guilty at his arraignment at San Diego County Superior Court's South County Court in Chula Vista. On Thursday November 4, Larry was denied bail and release, with the judge citing his past threat of harm upon an individual he believes was having an affair with Maya.

Following a petition in June 2022 by Larry's defense attorney that he was not competent to stand trial, Larry was examined by a psychiatrist. San Diego County Superior Court Judge Cindy Davis subsequently ruled in September 2022 that Larry was mentally competent to stand trial. Preliminary trial hearings occurred in January 2023, leading to Judge Dwayne Morning ordering Larry to stand trial for the murder of Maya; Larry will be on trial for murder, as well as a firearm possession charge. In September 2024, the judge agreed to push the start of the trial to July 7, 2025, after Larry and his attorney requested a delay due to financial hardship. In April 2025, the judge again delayed the trial until January 2026. In September 2025, the trial was once again delayed until March 9, 2026, which Millete's attorneys said was expected to be the final postponement. However, in January 2026, his attorneys requested another delay with a new trial date set for May 11, 2026.

On May 12, 2026, a jury of seven women and five men were selected with six alternative jurors of three men and three women also chosen after two days of jury selection; the trial began on May 18, 2026. The presiding judge ruled that during the trial Larry's lawyers could not imply that Maya was killed by anyone else. Additionally, the presiding judge admonished both prosecuting and defending attorneys for their conduct within and outside of the courtroom. On June 30, 2026 the prosecution rested their case in the trial; (Note: The prosecution's case consisted entirely of circumstantial evidence.) the defense rested their case the following day. Deliberation by the jurors began on July 8, 2026; after five hours of deliberation the jurors found Larry Milette guilty of first-degree murder on July 9, 2026. (Note: Five hours of deliberation occurred over two days.) At the time of Larry's conviction, Maya still hasn't been found.

Following the trial of Maya Millete's murder, Larry was to be trialed for a firearm law violation. However, on July 20, 2026, he changed his plea to guilty on an assault weapons charge; his sentencing was scheduled for September 29, 2026, but was delayed until November 2, 2026. On November 2, 2026, Larry was sentenced to 25 years to life in prison; (Note: KNSD stated that the sentence was for 27 years to life.) he maintains that he is innocent for what he has been convicted of.

== Millete children custody ==
In May 2021, Maya's parents requested visitations with the children; Larry refused and did not respond to any further communications with her parents. By July, Maya's parents had filed a formal petition for visitation rights and a hearing was set for December 2021. On October 19, 2021, the couple's children were passed to their paternal grandparents' custody. During Larry's arraignment, he was prohibited from contacting his children to prevent further emotional trauma.

On Wednesday October 27, Superior Court Judge Maryann D’Addezio ruled that Larry violated the restraining order prohibiting him from contacting his children by speaking with them during phone calls he made to his parents from jail. In total, he made over a hundred phone calls and spoke with his children for more than nine hours during which he asked them to read him newspaper articles about his upcoming trial. As a result, Larry was limited to only calling his attorney. That same day, Maya's sister submitted a motion to gain custody of the children and move them to Moreno Valley, California. On Wednesday 10 November, Judge Julia Craig Kelety granted Maya's sister visitation rights, but allowed the paternal grandparents to retain custody so the children could continue to attend their current schools in Chula Vista. (Note: The children's maternal relatives were initially allowed visitations weekly.) The children also received a court appointed guardian.

By early December 2021, both Maya's sister and the paternal grandparents had filed for guardianship of the children. In mid January 2022, maternal family visitation rights were modified, to allow for the children to travel up to Riverside County every other weekend, while extending paternal grandparent custody until at least April 2022. In October 2022, Larry was granted permission to communicate with his children by writing, but was still forbidden from communicating with his children through in-person visitation and telephone. In June 2023, the paternal grandparents continued guardianship of the children of Maya and Larry, with the youngest attending therapy, with maternal family visitation rights being modified to allow them to spend more time with the maternal family during the summer. In August 2023, a conservator was appointed by the court over Maya Millete's estate, to include the Chula Vista home. (Note: The Milettes' house was listed for sale in August 2023; it was sold in March 2025. Vehicles and other property were sold as well.) Maya's sister, Maricris, was awarded custody of the children in August 2024.

== See also ==
- List of murder convictions without a body
- List of people who disappeared mysteriously (2000–present)
- Murder of Christina Marie Williams
