= Hualapai Smith's =

Steamboat landing on the Sonora bank of the Colorado River

Coordinates: 32°24′46″N 114°50′35″W

Hualapai Smith's or Smith's Ferry was a steamboat landing and a ferry crossing and farm on the Sonora bank of the Colorado River, the border between Sonora and Baja California, from the later 1860s to 1878. It was located on the Colorado River in Sonora 20 miles overland from Yuma, Arizona and 30 miles down river from Fort Yuma in 1861.

Hualapai Smith's was named after the proprietor, J. L. Smith, known as Hualapai Smith for his exploit of being first to explore the Hualapai Valley of Arizona before any other prospector in the early 1860s. The site of Hualapai Smith's is within the ejido La Grullita southwest of San Luis Río Colorado, in the San Luis Río Colorado Municipality, Sonora.

== History ==
Hualapai Smith's was a successor to Gonzales' Ferry or Mariposa Ferry 30 miles below Fort Yuma and 3 miles below Paddock's Old Ferry on the Colorado River in Sonora. These two crossings existed there prior to the beginning of the American Civil War. Roads in Baja California led southeast of the Southern Emigrant Trail from New River Station and Alamo Mocho Station to these crossings into Sonora. Gonzales' Ferry was the name of place Confederate sympathizer Daniel Showalter mentions is the place he and his party intended to cross to avoid inspection by the Union troops at Fort Yuma. Paddock's Old Ferry had been long abandoned and the adobe house there was in ruins and the Gonzales' Ferry boat was destroyed by November 21, 1861, on orders of Lt. Col. West commander of Fort Yuma, to prevent any crossings by a Confederate force attempting to cross the Colorado River. Fecunda Gonzales the owner of Gonzales' Ferry had abandoned the location after his ferry was destroyed by Union troops in November 1861. He moved to Los Angeles and tried to get restitution for his loss.

The Mariposa ferry would have been on the river just west of the settlement shown as Mariposa on the 1865 map of Arizona Territory.

Due to the hostilities with the Hualapai and Paiute that began in 1865, many mines the vicinity of the northern Colorado River shut down for several years until they ended. J. L. Smith with a stake from mining up river, probably acquired the abandoned ferry and land for his farm there about this time and established a new landing. By the 1872 Smith's Ferry had been established, and was mentioned in the Saturday, December 7, 1872, The Arizona Sentinel of Yuma, Arizona:

"Mexican Doings. A report reached town yesterday to the effect that about forty Mexicans had taken possession of the property of J. L. Smith, better known as Hualapai Smith, who lives on the Mexican side of the line, about 20 miles from this city."

By August 19, 1873, the Sentinel reports Smith's ferry was alerted to watch for two men wanted for the murder of the station keeper of Kenyon Station.

The river landings on the Colorado below Yuma, were ended in 1878, after the Southern Pacific railroad reached that town in 1877. They purchased the Colorado Steam Navigation Company and by 1878 had replaced Port Isabel, Sonora with a river port and shipyard at the rail head in Yuma.

== Today ==
There is no trace of the old settlement, which is now under farmland and farm buildings in the ejido Grullita, along a former course of the Colorado River.
