= Osterhage =

Osterhage is a surname. Notable people with the surname include:

- Deborah Osterhage, Australian ichthyologist
- Jeff Osterhage (born 1953), American actor
- Patrick Osterhage (born 2000), German football player
