= The Legend of the Golden Gun =

1979 TV film

- Genre: Western
- Written by: James D. Parriott
- Directed by: Alan J. Levi
- Starring: Jeff Osterhage; Hal Holbrook; Carl Franklin; Robert Davi
- Theme music composer: Jerrold Immel
- Country of origin: United States
- Original language: English

Production
- Executive producers: Harve Bennett; Harris Katleman
- Producer: B. W. Sandefur
- Production locations: Warner Brothers Burbank Studios - 4000 Warner Boulevard, Burbank, California
- Cinematography: Gerald Perry Finnerman
- Editor: Robert F. Shugrue
- Running time: 100 minutes
- Production companies: Bennett/Katleman Productions; Columbia Pictures Television

Original release
- Network: NBC
- Release: April 10, 1979

The Legend of the Golden Gun is a 1979 American Western television film, starring Jeff Osterhage, Hal Holbrook, Carl Franklin, and Robert Davi.

== Plot summary ==
John Golden, a young farmer whose parents are murdered meets Joshua Brown, a runaway slave, and they team up to track down the legendary Confederate guerrilla William Quantrill. Along their travels, they run into a legendary gunfighter, who teaches the young farmer how to shoot and gives him a special gun that shoots seven rounds, the seventh of which is intended as an advantage against evil.

== Cast ==
- Jeff Osterhage as John Golden
- Carl Franklin as Joshua Brown
- Robert Davi as William Quantrill
- Keir Dullea as General Custer
- Michele Carey as Maggie
- John McLiam as Jake Powell
- Elissa Leeds as Sara Powell
- R. G. Armstrong as Judge Harrison Harding
- Hal Holbrook as J.R. Swackhammer
- William Bryant as William Ford
- Rex Holman as Sturges
- J. Brian Pizer as Captain Marks
- R. L. Tolbert as Buffalo Bill
- Budge Taylor as Dr. Wheller
- Walt Davis as Soldier #3
- Michael Yama as The photographer
- David Holbrook as The young outlaw

== DVD ==
The Legend of the Golden Gun was released on DVD on December 4, 2012.
