= Sackett (surname) =

Family name

Sackett (occasionally Sacket) is an English surname originating in the Isle of Thanet, Kent, probably at Sackett's Hill in the parish of St Peter in Thanet (now Broadstairs and St Peter's). The earliest record of the name dates from 1317 when William Saket of Southborough, St Peter in Thanet, was in a legal dispute with the Abbot of St Augustine, Canterbury.

The Sacketts were among the first colonists of America, with Simon Sackett arriving at the Massachusetts Bay Colony a few months after the Winthrop Fleet of 1630, and John Sackett, possibly a nephew of Simon, arriving at the New Haven Colony sometime before 1641.

== Variants ==
Early variants were Sakt and Saket. Later records are of Sacket, Sackett, Sackette, Sackitt. The only extant forms are Sacket, Sackett and Sackitt, with Sackett predominating.

== Origin of the surname ==
Several derivations of the surname Sackett have been proposed:

- descent from Adam le Sackere, a "sacker" and exporter of wool;
- manufacturer of sacks, being a diminutive of either Old English sacc or Norse-Viking Sekkr;
- a nickname from Middle English sa(c)ket ‘small sack, purse’, perhaps for a maker of purses;
- an "adversary", from French Sacquet and Old German Sacco, meaning to dispute, strive, blame;
- a "cottager by the sea", the early form "Saket" meaning "sea", then pronounced "say", and "cot", on the analogy of Beckett, "bee" and "cot" indicating a cottager who kept bees.

The word "sacket" has two dictionary definitions: a bag; and a term of reproach or abuse.

None of these possible derivations of the surname is likely. Any would have resulted in the name arising independently in different places; but such is the concentration of the name in early records in a small area of Thanet that it may be supposed that the name originated in a single family. Certainly, the surname, first found in 1317, is seen to predate the earliest recorded use (c1440) of the word "sakett" meaning a bag.

== Notable Sacketts ==
- Albert M. Sackett (1920–2016), Rear Admiral, US Navy, fought in three wars (World War II, Korea and Vietnam) and served 40 years of active duty.
- Augustine Sackett (1841–1914), patented Sackett Board, the precursor to modern drywall, in 1884.
- David Sackett, OC, FRSC (1934–2015) is a Canadian medical doctor and a pioneer in evidence-based medicine.
- Frederic Mosley Sackett (1868–1941) was US Ambassador to Germany during the collapse of the Weimar Republic and Hitler's rise to power.
- Delos Bennett Sackett (1822–1885) was a commander in the American Civil War and became Inspector General of the United States Army.
- William A. Sackett (1811–1895) was a U.S. representative from New York state.
- Nathaniel Sackett (1737–1805) was the spymaster appointed by George Washington to create a network of civilian spies located in New York during the American Revolution.
- Joseph F. Sackett (1940– ) is an American clinical radiologist and professor of neuroradiology.
- Julia Sanderson (née Sackett), (1888–1975) was a singer and actress who achieved stardom in both New York and London.
- Penny Sackett (1956– ) is an astronomer and Chief Scientist of Australia.
- Susan Sackett (1943– ) is an American author and screenwriter, best known for her involvement in the Star Trek franchise.

== Distribution of the name ==
Although the name originated in England, there are now many more Sacketts in the United States. The great majority of these are in the line of Simon Sackett the colonist (1595–1635). Sacketts in the UK number just under 500, giving a frequency of 9 per million, and a surname ranking of 11,423. There are about 5,500 Sacketts in the USA, a frequency of 20 per million, and a ranking of 5,759. Australia has about 70 residents with the name, which is ranked 19,192, with a frequency of 4 per million.

== Sackett places ==
- Sackett's Hill, St Peter in Thanet, Kent, "so called from its being the estate of an ancient yeomanry family of this name".
- Sackets Harbor, New York
- Sackett's Wells, California
- Sackett Lake, New York
- For a more extensive list of Sackett place names, see "Sackett places" at The Sackett Family Association

== Fictional characters ==
The author Louis L'Amour chose the name Sackett for the central characters in a series of novels after finding Sackett's Well in California.
