= J. L. Smith (Hualapai Smith) =

Forty-Niner and Arizona pioneer (1817–1887)

J. L. Smith, also known as Hualapai Smith, (1817? – January 19, 1887), a Forty-Niner, and an Arizona pioneer, a ferry and steamboat landing operator on the Colorado River, Hualapai Smith's in Sonora after 1865 into the 1870s.

Nothing is known of the date and location of his birth or his life before he came to California in 1849, nor much of his life before he came to Arizona Territory in 1862. There he earned his nickname Hualapai Smith "by being the first man to enter the Hualapai Valley."

After 1865, he acquired the site of an old ferry crossing in Sonora, which he revived and made a steamboat landing and woodyard, for the Colorado Steam Navigation Company. This place was called Hualapai Smith's or Smith's Ferry, located 30 miles below Fort Yuma and 3 miles below Pedrick's and 20 miles from Yuma.

J. L. Smith's death and a brief biography are recorded in the January 22, 1887, Arizona Sentinel of Yuma, Arizona:

"Sheriff Nugent returned from Phoenix on Thursday morning. He informs us of the death on Wednesday in the asylum, of J. L. Smith, well known throughout the Territory as "Hualapai" Smith, an appellation which he earned by being the first man to enter the Hualapai Valley. In the days of long ago he was Sheriff of Santa Barbara County California, and until about four years ago was a man of great energy. He came to the coast in '49 and for the past 25 years has resided in the Territory. One year ago he had a stroke of apoplexy which caused the loss of his mind. His age was about seventy."
