= The Shadow Riders =

1982 Western TV film by Andrew V. McLaglen

- Film poster
- Genre: Romance; Western
- Based on: The Shadow Riders by Louis L'Amour
- Screenplay by: Jim Byrnes
- Directed by: Andrew V. McLaglen
- Starring: Tom Selleck; Sam Elliott; Dominique Dunne; Katharine Ross
- Theme music composer: Jerrold Immel
- Country of origin: United States
- Original language: English

Production
- Executive producer: Jim Byrnes
- Producers: Dennis Durney; Verne Nobles
- Cinematography: Jack Whitman
- Editor: Bud Friedgen
- Running time: 96 minutes
- Production companies: CBS Entertainment Productions; Columbia Pictures Television; The Pegasus Group

Original release
- Network: CBS
- Release: September 28, 1982

The Shadow Riders is a 1982 American Western television film directed by Andrew V. McLaglen and starring Tom Selleck, Sam Elliott, Dominique Dunne, and Katharine Ross. Based on the 1982 novel of the same name by Louis L'Amour, the film is about two brothers who meet up after fighting on opposite sides of the Civil War, and return home, only to find their siblings kidnapped by ruthless raiders. Together, they set out on an adventure to rescue their family. The film reunites actors Selleck, Elliot, and Jeff Osterhage, who also starred in the 1979 film The Sacketts. The Shadow Riders first aired in the United States on Tuesday, September 28, 1982.

== Plot ==
At the end of the Civil War, Confederate soldier Dal Traven (Sam Elliott) is about to be lynched when he is rescued by his brother Mac (Tom Selleck) who served as a Union officer. Despite serving on different sides, the brothers bear no ill will toward each other.

Dal and Mac arrive home to find that their home has been looted and their two sisters, their brother Jesse (Jeff Osterhage), and Dal's girlfriend Kate (Katherine Ross) have been kidnapped. Ashbury is who looted their home (along with many other homesteads). Ashbury has made camp by the Gulf of Mexico, where he is waiting to meet a smuggler by the name of Holiday Hammond. He plans to trade the goods, livestock, and prisoners he has stolen for guns to fight the Union. Jesse and Kate attempt an escape, but it does not go according to plan. Desperate, Jesse swims into the gulf, but is shot and presumed dead.

Hammond arrives by boat and takes all of the prisoners, except Kate, to Mexico to be sold. Ashbury accompanies him. Dal and Mac track the Confederates and come across their wounded brother. The three of them attack the Confederate camp and rescue Kate. Kate informs the brothers that their sisters have been taken to Mexico. However, none of them has the local knowledge needed to navigate Mexico. Dal and Mac break their uncle Jack (Ben Johnson) out of jail to guide them.

Meanwhile in Mexico, Ashbury confronts Hammond, who has continually deflected Ashbury's questions about the guns promised to him. Hammond reveals that he never had any intention of selling any guns and imprisons Ashbury. Jack successfully leads the group to Hammond's hideout and a battle commences. During the battle, Ashbury escapes, but is caught by Dal. Dal prepares to shoot Ashbury for kidnapping his sisters, but spares him, as Ashbury had earlier saved his life.

Hammond takes the Traven sisters and attempts to escape by train, but Dal and Mac pursue him on horseback, eventually catching the train. The brothers save their sisters and capture Hammond, but just as the Travens are reunited, the Texan sheriff who put Jack in jail arrives to arrest him again. However, the Travens convince the sheriff to trade Jack for Hammond (the most wanted man in Texas). With the rest of the prisoners freed, all five Traven siblings, Kate, and Jack begin the trip back to Texas.

== Cast ==
- Tom Selleck as Mac Traven
- Sam Elliott as Dal Traven
- Dominique Dunne as Sissy Traven
- Katharine Ross as Kate Connery / Sister Katherine
- Ben Johnson as Uncle 'Black Jack' Traven
- Scanlon Gail as Yankee Officer
- Geoffrey Lewis as Major Cooper Ashbury, Comanchero Leader
- Jeff Osterhage as Jesse Traven
- Gene Evans as Colonel Holiday Hammond, Gunrunner
- R. G. Armstrong as Sheriff Miles Gillette
- Marshall R. Teague as Lieutenant Butler
- Ben Fuhrman as Devol
- Jane Greer as Ma Traven
- Harry Carey, Jr. as Pa Traven
- Natalie May as Heather Traven
- Jeannetta Arnette as Southern Belle
- Owen Orr as Frank King, Kate's Fiancee
- Kristina David as Renfro Damsel
- Joe Capone as Sergeant Ballock
- Robert B. Craig as Laird

== Production ==
=== Filming locations ===
- Columbia State Historic Park, 22708 Broadway, Columbia, California
- Railtown 1897 State Historic Park, Jamestown, California (Train scenes)
- Santa Cruz, California
- Sonora, California
- Brookings, Oregon
