= Thompson, New York =

- Town
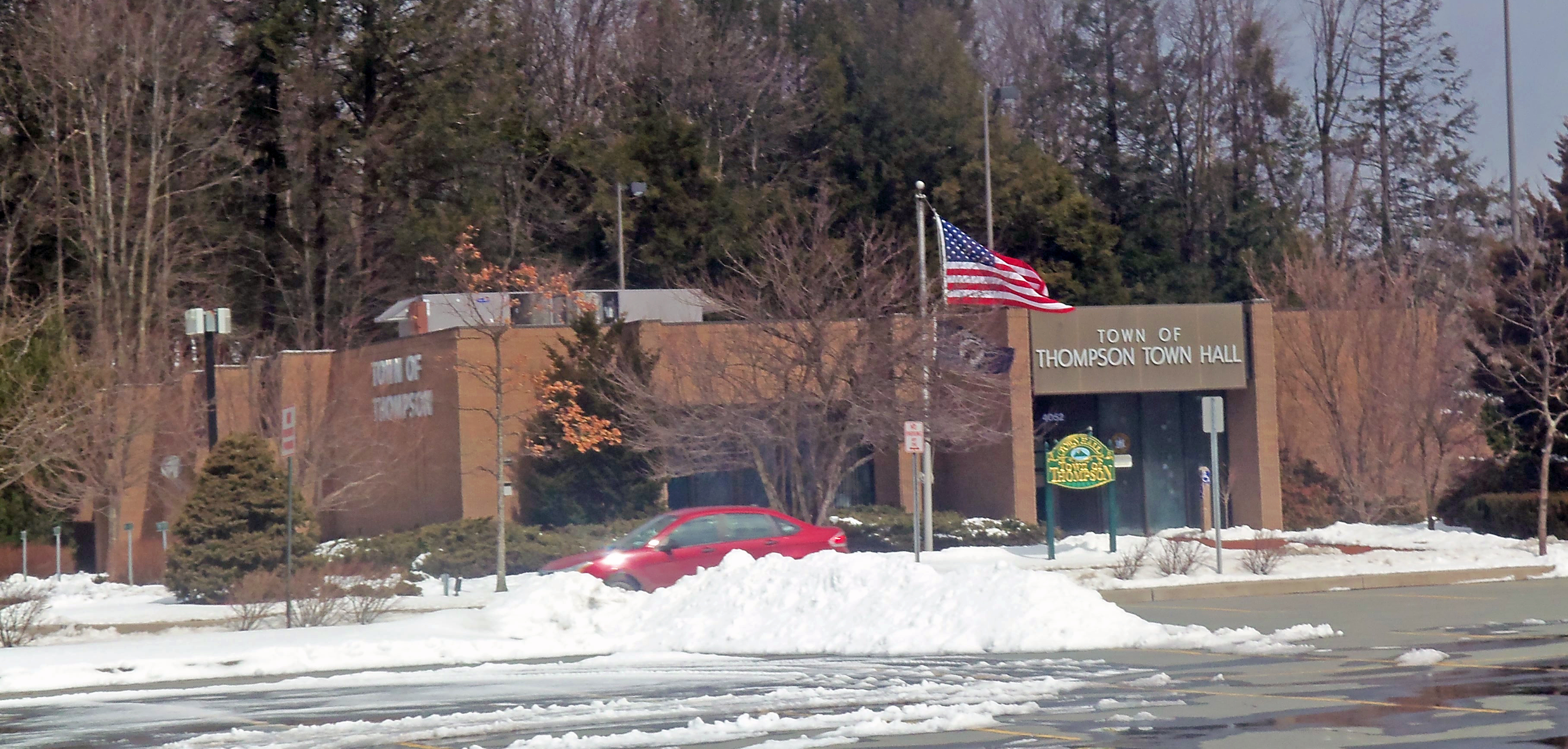
- Town hall on Route 42, 2013

- Location of Thompson in Sullivan County, New York
- Coordinates: 41°38′58″N 74°40′21″W
- Country: United States
- State: New York
- County: Sullivan

Area
  - Total: 87.50 sq mi (226.62 km^{2})
  - Land: 84.09 sq mi (217.79 km^{2})
  - Water: 3.41 sq mi (8.83 km^{2})
- Elevation: 1,480 ft (450 m)

Population (2020)
  - Total: 16,550
  - Density: 196.8/sq mi (75.99/km^{2})
- Time zone: UTC-5 (Eastern (EST))
  - Summer (DST): UTC-4 (EDT)
- FIPS code: 36-73627
- GNIS feature ID: 0979543
- Website: https://thompsonny.gov/

Thompson is a town in the southern part of Sullivan County, New York, United States. The population was recorded as 16,550 in the 2020 census. The town is named after William A. Thompson, an early settler who served as the first judge of Sullivan County.

== History ==
The area that became Thompson was initially inhabited by bands of the Munsee Lenape Native Americans. The first European settlers, two farmers, arrived in Thompson in 1749, where they created the beginnings of a settlement in the vicinity of Dutch pond. Thompson was established in 1803 from the town of Mamakating. Part of the town was taken from the town of Fallsburg in 1826.

== Geography ==
According to the United States Census Bureau, the town has a total area of 87.4 square miles (226 km^{2}), of which 84.1 square miles (218 km^{2}) is land and 3.3 square miles (8.5 km^{2}) (3.77%) is water.

== Demographics ==
Historical population
Census	Pop.	Note	%±
1820	1,897		—
1830	2,459		29.6%
1840	2,610		6.1%
1850	3,198		22.5%
1860	3,834		19.9%
1870	3,514		−8.3%
1880	3,763		7.1%
1890	3,462		−8.0%
1900	3,739		8.0%
1910	4,196		12.2%
1920	4,597		9.6%
1930	5,950		29.4%
1940	6,054		1.7%
1950	6,912		14.2%
1960	8,792		27.2%
1970	11,418		29.9%
1980	13,550		18.7%
1990	13,711		1.2%
2000	14,189		3.5%
2010	15,308		7.9%
2020	16,550		8.1%
U.S. Decennial Census 2020

As of the census of 2000, there were 14,189 people, 5,543 households, and 3,481 families residing in the town. The population density was 168.7 inhabitants per square mile (65.1/km^{2}). There were 9,258 housing units at an average density of 110.1 per square mile (42.5/km^{2}). The racial makeup of the town was 73.70% white, 16.94% African American, 0.18% Native American, 1.85% Asian, 0.03% Pacific Islander, 4.64% from other races, and 2.67% from two or more races. Hispanic or Latino of any race were 14.56% of the population.

There were 5,543 households, out of which 30.0% had children under the age of 18 living with them, 42.4% were married couples living together, 15.2% had a female householder with no husband present, and 37.2% were non-families. 30.6% of all households were made up of individuals, and 11.3% had someone living alone who was 65 years of age or older. The average household size was 2.44 and the average family size was 3.04.

In the town, the population was spread out, with 26.0% under the age of 18, 7.4% from 18 to 24, 26.8% from 25 to 44, 25.5% from 45 to 64, and 14.2% who were 65 years of age or older. The median age was 38 years. For every 100 females, there were 97.0 males. For every 100 females age 18 and over, there were 94.0 males.

The median income for a household in the town was $35,511, and the median income for a family was $41,043. Males had a median income of $37,759 versus $26,692 for females. The per capita income for the town was $18,668. About 18.3% of families and 23.3% of the population were below the poverty line, including 34.9% of those under age 18 and 13.4% of those age 65 or over.

== Communities and locations in the town of Thompson ==
- Ateres – a village near Kiamesha Lake on Gibber Road.
- Bridgeville – a hamlet southeast of Monticello on Route 17.
- Coopers Corners – a hamlet west of Monticello.
- East Monticello – a location east of Monticello on Route 17.
- Emerald Green – a hamlet by the eastern town line on Route 17.
- Glen Wild – a hamlet east of Monticello. The Anshei Glen Wild Synagogue and Glen Wild Methodist Church are listed on the National Register of Historic Places.
- Harris – a hamlet north and west of Monticello.
- Kiamesha Lake – a hamlet north of Monticello on Route 42.
- Maplewood – a hamlet west of Monticello.
- Melody Lake – a location by the southern town line.
- Monticello – village which is the county seat.
- Rock Hill – a hamlet southeast of Monticello on Route 17.
- Sackett Lake – a location in the southwestern part of the town.
- Thompsonville – a hamlet in the eastern part of the town.
