= Sackett Lake =

- Location within New York Location within the United States
- Location: Sullivan County, New York
- Coordinates: 41°37′29″N 74°44′28″W
- Type: lake
- Surface area: 127 acres (51 ha)
- Surface elevation: 1,329 feet (405 m)

Sackett Lake is located in Thompson, New York with a small community that revolves around the lake by the same name. It is approximately 4 miles southwest of Monticello, the county seat of Sullivan County. The lake is 127 acres (51 ha) at an elevation of 1,329 feet (405 m).

It includes Fireman's Camp (for use by the volunteer firefighters in the area), Beaver Dam, Winston Day Camp, and a JCC. Sackett Lake is now home to a large diverse community. It is a diverse and picturesque area that is just far enough from the village to feel very rural.

== Borscht Belt years ==
During the height of the "Borscht Belt" in the Catskills, The Laurels Hotel and Country Club occupied the northern section of Sackett Lake. On summer weekends top singers and bands, such as Louis Armstrong, played in the nightclub. The Laurels boasted outdoor and indoor pools, a 9-hole golf course, ice skating rink, boat rentals, and a ski lift located behind the golf course's Pro Shop. There were also about 35 bungalows near the golf course that were rented out for the summer. The Laurels was able to hold its own against larger Borscht Belt hotels such as Grossinger's and the Concord, despite lacking signature towers and professional links. However, The Laurels was foreclosed upon in the mid-1970s and had a devastating, suspicious fire in 1980. The buildings stood for several years and were torn down in the 1980s. The land is now home to many species of wild birds, such as the blue heron. Two other hotels were located on the other side of Sackett Lake Road: the Belmore Hotel and the Old Congress Hotel. Both had "casinos" or halls on lakeside property. The Bellmore Hotel burned down in the late 1960s. The Old Congress Hotel reopened several times, but failed. It opened as a high school football camp in the early 1970s, but that also failed. The land was unused for many years, but now contains a community of private homes called Sackett Lake Estates. Across Sackett Lake from the Laurels was a small hotel named the Sackett Lake Lodge. It consisted of a main building, lakeside bungalows and a “casino.” It was owned by Louis and Anne Witkin and Jack and Ann (aka) Bubbie Katz. It burned down in the early 1960s.

== Camps ==
There were three "sleepaway" (overnight) camps on the lake - Camp Winston, Camp Roosevelt, and Camp Ta-Go-La. Camp Winston closed in the 1960s and is now a private community of modular homes called Camelot Woods. Camp Roosevelt and Camp Ta-Go-La are now orthodox overnight summer camps, Camp Romimu and Camp Adas Bnos Vien, respectively. There were a few bungalow colonies that dotted the lake, such as Goodman's Showboat Colony. The "showboat" was a white building that sat overhanging the lake on the center of the western side. It contained a large room used for weekend gatherings of the bungalow renters and their guests, and also had a small apartment where Abe and Miriam Goodman, the bungalow colony owners, stayed during the summer season. The hotel and bungalow colonies are gone and Sackett Lake now comprises mainly private homes. There was also a third small hotel on Sackett Lake Road above the Congress Hotel called the Sackett Lake Lodge.
