= Kern River Slough Station =

Coordinates: 35°15′35″N 118°58′3″W

- Former settlement
- Interactive map of Kern River Slough Station
- Country: United States
- State: California
- County: Kern County

California Historical Landmark
- Reference no.: 588

Kern River Slough Station was a stagecoach stop on the Butterfield Overland Mail 1st Division route from 1858 to 1861. The Butterfield Overland Mail (1857–1861) site is now registered California Historical Landmark #588. The site is 3 miles (4.8 km) west of Lamont.

The California Historical Landmark reads:

NO. 588 KERN RIVER SLOUGH STATION - Just south of this point stood the Kern River Slough Station on the Butterfield Overland Stage route. Operating through present Kern County during 1858-1861, this famous line ran from St. Louis, Missouri to San Francisco until the outbreak of the Civil War.

== See also ==
- Butterfield Overland Mail in California
- California Historical Landmarks in Kern County
- California Historical Landmark
