= Fish Creek Mountains Wilderness =

Protected wilderness area in California, United States

- IUCN category Ib (wilderness area)
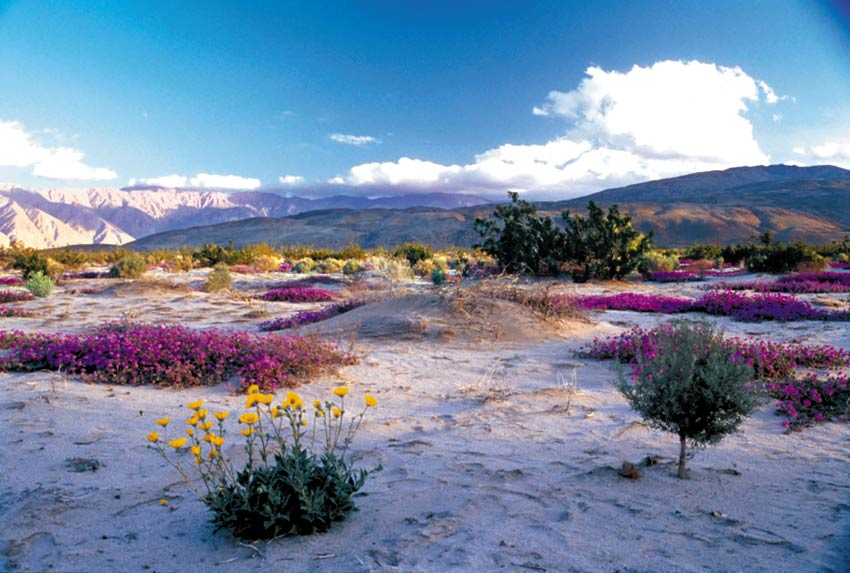
- Fish Creek Mountains Wilderness in springtime, with Mexican gold poppy

- Location within California Location within the United States
- Location: Imperial County, California
- Nearest city: Brawley, California
- Coordinates: 32°58′28″N 116°00′46″W
- Established: 1994
- Governing body: Bureau of Land Management

The Fish Creek Mountains Wilderness is located about 25 miles west of Brawley, California, and southeast of the Vallecito Mountains in the United States. The wilderness is located in the Fish Creek Mountains region in the northern part of the Carrizo Impact Area, which is closed to the public.

== Geography ==
The Fish Creek Mountains resemble a plateau rising as a great wall above the desert basin. From a distance, few dramatic peaks are visible. However, on closer examination, a rugged land of jagged ridges and peaks appears above twisting canyons and small valleys, creating a pristine natural environment. The steep mountain slopes contain limestone outcrops that have resisted erosion. As a result, water from cloudbursts has created narrow chutes swirling with water. Shielded from the sun's evaporating rays, water at the base of these chutes remains year-round serving wildlife as natural tanks. A portion of the ancient Lake Cahuilla shoreline is visible within this wilderness. The lake was a great body of freshwater once covering the Imperial and Coachella Valleys, receding 500 years ago.

== Visiting ==
Camping is permitted outside of the Carrizo Impact Area, but is limited to 14 days. After 14 days, campers must relocate at least 25 miles (40 km) from previous site. The wilderness covers 21,425 acres (86.70 km^{2}). It is south of Anza-Borrego Desert State Park in the Colorado Desert, and west of the Imperial Valley.

== See also ==
- Official Fish Creek Mountains Wilderness Area website
- BLM Fish Creek Mountains Wilderness Map
