= Jeff Osterhage =

American actor

Jeffrey Osterhage (born March 12, 1953) is an American film and television actor from Columbus, Indiana. He graduated from North Farmington High School, Farmington Hills, Michigan, and Western Michigan University with a BBA Degree (1976).

== Life and career ==
Osterhage is of German descent, and began his acting career in a television adaptation of True Grit in 1978 and starred in the 1979 TV movie The Legend of the Golden Gun. He is probably most recognizable to western fans in his role as Tyrel Sackett in the 1979 western The Sacketts, followed by the 1982 The Shadow Riders, both being film adaptations of novels by western novelist Louis L'Amour. In both films he starred opposite Tom Selleck and Sam Elliott. In the first film he also starred alongside western legends Ben Johnson and Glenn Ford, with Johnson also starring in the second. Osterhage has appeared in twenty-seven films, made-for-television movies, and television series appearances in TV series including The Dukes of Hazzard, Knight Rider, T. J. Hooker, Scarecrow and Mrs. King, Murder, She Wrote, Moonlighting, Simon & Simon, Matlock, as well as the computer game Baldur's Gate II: Shadows of Amn. His latest appearance is in the 2008 film Taken by Force. He also played Marshal James Anderson in the computer game Outlaws, released in 1997.

Osterhage also appeared in the short-lived 1989 revival of Dragnet, called The New Dragnet, alongside Bernard White.

== Filmography ==
- True Grit: A Further Adventure – TV movie – Christopher Sumner (1978)
- The Sacketts – TV movie – Tyrel Sackett (1979)
- The Legend of the Golden Gun – TV Movie – John Golden (1979)
- The Texas Rangers – TV Movie (1981)
- The Shadow Riders – TV movie – Jesse Traven (1982)
- Sky Bandits – Luke (1986)
- Buckeye and Blue – Blue Duck Harris (1988)
- South of Reno - Martin Clark (1988)
- Masque of the Red Death Claudio (1989)
- Big Bad John – Alvin Mahoney (1990)
- The Sacketts Go West – Video Documentary Short – Himself (2006)

== Television ==
- Knight Rider – episode – K.I.T.T. vs. K.A.R.R. – John Stanton (1984)
- The Dukes of Hazzard – episode – Play It Again, Luke – Eddie Lee Memphis (1984)
- Scarecrow and Mrs. King – episode – The Three Faces of Emily – Garrison (1984)
- Murder, She Wrote – episode – Funeral at Fifty-Mile – Art Merrick (1985)
- T.J. Hooker – episode – Homecoming – Dale Hunter (1985)
- Murder, She Wrote – episode – Powder Keg – Ed Bonner (1986)
- Moonlighting – episode – Blonde on Blonde – Mr. Goodbar (1987)
- Simon & Simon – episode – The Richer They Are the Harder They Fall – Lance Van Alde (1988)
- The New Dragnet – 47 episodes – Vic Daniels (1989–91)
- Matlock – episode – The Assassination: Parts 1 & 2 – Matt Greenwood (1992)

== Video games ==
- Outlaws – Marshal James Anderson (1997)
- Baldur's Gate II: Shadows of Amn – Valygar Corthala (2000)
