= Glen Wild Methodist Church =

Historic church in New York, United States

- U.S. National Register of Historic Places
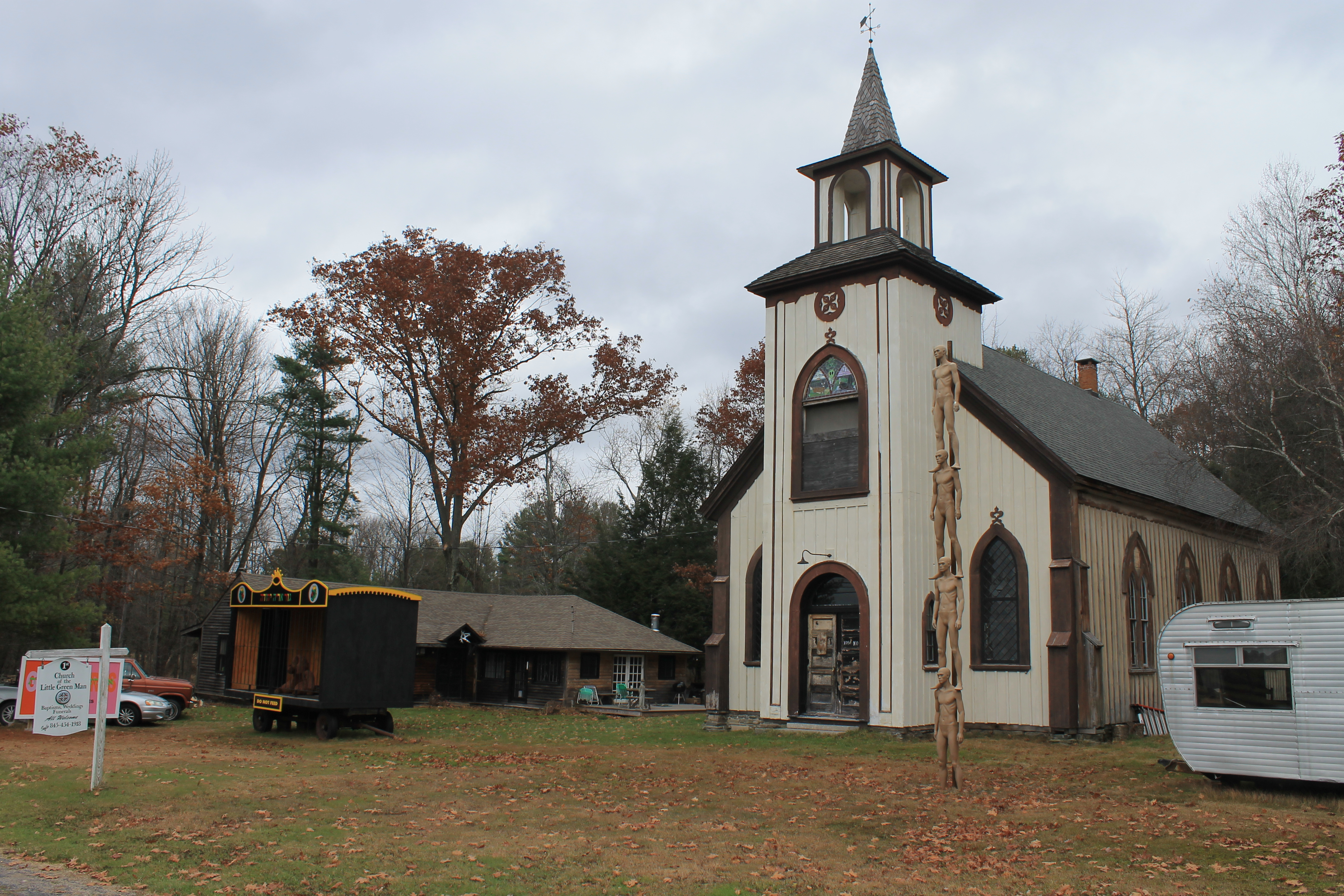
- The Glen Wild Methodist Church in 2013

- Location within New York Location within the United States
- Location: Old Glen Wild Rd., Glen Wild, New York
- Coordinates: 41°39′58″N 74°35′18″W
- Area: 1 acre (0.40 ha)
- Built: 1867
- Architectural style: Gothic Revival
- NRHP reference No.: 84003035
- Added to NRHP: May 10, 1984

Glen Wild Methodist Church is a historic Methodist church on Old Glen Wild Road in Glen Wild, Sullivan County, New York. It was built in 1867 and is a rectangular, wood-frame building with board and batten siding in a vernacular Gothic Revival style. It features square based tower, with belfry and steeple, projecting from the front facade. Also on the property is the former church hall built in 1944. It is a small, one-story wood-frame L-shaped building.

It was added to the National Register of Historic Places in 1984.
