= Pilot Knob Station =

Overland Mail stagecoach stop in California

Coordinates: 32°45′0″N 114°41′46″W

Pilot Knob Station, a former stage station of the Butterfeild Overland Mail, located near Andrade, California. It was placed 10 miles west of the Fort Yuma stage station on the road along the Colorado River, in California, and 18 miles east of the Cooke's Wells Station in Baja California. Pilot Knob is the name of a volcanic plug located southwest of station.

It was subsequently used by the Union Army as station for its troops and supply wagons during the American Civil War and was a stage station again after the Civil War until the Southern Pacific Railroad, arrived in Yuma, Arizona ending the need for the stage line from California.

The ruins of Pilot Knob Station are more commonly referred to as the Anza Stage Station.
