= The Sacketts =

1979 film

- DVD cover
- Genre: Western
- Based on: The Daybreakers and Sackett by Louis L'Amour
- Screenplay by: Jim Byrnes
- Directed by: Robert Totten
- Starring: Sam Elliott; Tom Selleck; Jeff Osterhage; Glenn Ford; Ben Johnson
- Music by: Jerrold Immel
- Country of origin: United States
- Original language: English

Production
- Executive producers: Douglas Netter; Jim Byrnes
- Producers: Douglas Netter; Jim Byrnes
- Production locations: Buckskin Joe Frontier Town & Railway, Canon City, Colorado; Mescal, Arizona; Old Tucson Studios, Arizona; Red Hills Ranch, Sonora, California
- Cinematography: Jack Whitman
- Editor: Howard A. Smith
- Running time: 170 minutes
- Production companies: Douglas Netter Productions; M.B. Scott Productions; Shalako Enterprises (produced in association with) Media Productions

Original release
- Network: NBC
- Release: May 15, 1979

The Sacketts is a 1979 American made-for-television Western miniseries directed by Robert Totten and starring Sam Elliott, Tom Selleck, Jeff Osterhage, and Glenn Ford. Based on the novels The Daybreakers (1960) and Sackett (1961) by Louis L'Amour, the film recounts the story of the Sackett brothers in 1869 who leave their Tennessee home and start a new life together in Santa Fe.

== Plot ==
Three brothers from Tennessee, the sons of Welsh immigrants, named Tell Sackett, Orrin Sackett, and Tyrel Sackett, respectively, are brought together by the tragic events that occur at Orrin's wedding. Tell (Sam Elliott) is a mountain man who hasn't seen his family in almost ten years, Orrin (Tom Selleck) is a former lawman now looking to settle down with his family, and Tyrel (Jeff Osterhage) is the youngest brother who is very good with a revolver. At the wedding, Long Higgins (James O'Connell), the brother of a man Orrin had previously killed, arrives in the middle of the ceremony and holds Orrin at gunpoint. Long pulls the trigger, but Orrin's fiancée gets in the way and is shot and killed. Tyrel arrives and shoots Long dead.

Having killed a man, Tyrel clears out of Tennessee and heads west. Following the funeral of Orrin's fiancée, his mother tells him to join Tyrel and find Tell, and to go start a life in the west. Meanwhile, Tell has found work in a mining camp in Uvalde, Texas. During a card game, Tell accuses one of the men, Wes Bigelow, of cheating and shoots him dead. The leader of the mining camp suggests that Tell should leave before the victim's brothers arrive to seek revenge, and Tell heads out alone into the wilderness.

On his way west, Tyrel meets with a cattle drive and signs on as a cowhand. He immediately becomes friends with aging cowhand Cap Rountree (Ben Johnson), and former gunfighter Tom Sunday (Glenn Ford), who becomes a mentor to Tyrel. Orrin catches up with the group and joins them. As they finish the drive in Abilene, Kansas, Cap, Tom, Orrin, and Tyrel make plans to collect wild cattle near the Purgatoire River. While in the town, Orrin becomes attracted to the daughter of wealthy man Jonathan Pritts (John Vernon), while Tyrel becomes attracted to Dona Drusilla (Ana Alicia), the granddaughter of wealthy Mexican Don Luis (Gilbert Roland). Don Luis and Pritts are arguing with each other over Luis' land in Santa Fe, New Mexico.

Orrin and Tyrel eventually meet up with Tell in a small town in Colorado called Purgatorie. Cap and Tell decide to go searching for gold up in the mountains, while Orrin, Tyrel, and Sunday continue with their plan to collect wild cattle on the way to Santa Fe. Soon after they leave, Ira Bigelow (Jack Elam) arrives in town and declares that he is tracking Tell Sackett with the aim of killing him.

In Elizabethtown, New Mexico, Tell and Cap are confronted by a young gunfighter named Kid Newton. Tell avoids a gunbattle with Newton by talking him down and ordering him to leave. When Ira Bigelow's search for Tell brings him to Elizabethtown, Newton offers to be his guide.

Just before reaching Santa Fe, Sunday, Orrin, and Tyrel come across the corpses of a family killed by Indians. Upon finding a safe-box containing $1,000, Orrin and Sunday disagree over what to do with the money, with Sunday wanting to split the money among the three of them and Orrin wanting to send the money to a relative of those killed, mentioned in a letter found near one of the bodies. Tyrell backs Orrin, which does not sit well with Sunday. Upon reaching Santa Fe, when Sunday finds out that Orrin and Tyrell returned the money, the relationship between Orrin and him slowly disintegrates, with Tyrel caught in the middle, though he generally sides with his brother.

Meanwhile, while searching for gold in the mountains, Cap and Tell find a lost woman, Ange Kerry (Wendy Rastatter). Ira Bigelow, his brother Jack (Slim Pickens) and their hired men soon arrive and eventually assault Tell's camp, wounding Cap in the leg and trapping the three of them in the caves, where they hide out.

Both Orrin and Sunday run in the election for town sheriff. Pritts, knowing that if Sunday wins he will side with Don Luis and the Mexicans and expecting that he can control Orrin (since Orrin is interested in his daughter) helps Orrin win the election by disclosing that Sunday is a disbarred lawyer and ex-convict from Louisiana. Humiliated, Sunday starts drinking heavily and becomes increasingly hostile towards Orrin. Sunday accuses Orrin of being bought by Pritts and slaps Orrin when Orrin calls him a liar. Later, Orrin sends Tyrell to ask Sunday to be his deputy, but Sunday blames Orrin for ruining his dream of a fresh start in Santa Fe and angrily refuses the offer.

Don Luis dies shortly afterward. Orrin and Tyrel, now appointed as deputy sheriff, prove that Pritts ordered a Mexican killed, and then ordered another of his men to kill him after he is caught. Pritts is taken away by the territorial marshall. Orrin decides to run for mayor if Tyrel stays as sheriff. As Orrin is announcing his intention to the townspeople in the plaza, Sunday arrives seeking a final confrontation with Orrin. Tyrel sees him first and stands in his way. When Tyrel refuses to move, Sunday draws his gun. Tyrel draws and shoots Sunday first. Tyrel weeps as Sunday dies in his arms.

Still trapped in the caves and with Cap unable to go far due to his wounded leg, Ange escapes on a stolen horse and wires a message for help to Orrin, while Tell and Cap (when his leg is strong enough) escape back to Purgatorie on foot. The Bigelows and their men catch up to them in town and challenge Tell to a gunfight the next day at daybreak. Orrin and Tyrel receive Ange's telegram and rush to join Tell at Purgatorie.

The following day Tell strides out onto the street alone to face the Bigelow gang, now including the last Bigelow brother, Benson (Gene Evans). Unbeknownst to Tell, Cap grabs a shotgun and hobbles after him. Tell finds Orrin and Tyrel waiting for him in the street. As the Bigelows and their men start to emerge from the livery stable, the Sacketts open fire and the gun battle begins. With the help of Cap, the Sacketts kill all seven of the Bigelow gang. Cap joins the reunited Sackett brothers as they walk away down the street.

== Cast ==
- Sam Elliott as Tell Sackett
- Tom Selleck as Orrin Sackett
- Jeff Osterhage as Tyrel Sackett
- Glenn Ford as Tom Sunday
- Ben Johnson as Cap Rountree
- Gilbert Roland as Don Luis
- John Vernon as Jonathan Pritts
- Ruth Roman as Rosie
- Jack Elam as Ira Bigelow
- Gene Evans as Benson Bigelow
- L. Q. Jones as Belden
- Paul Koslo as Kid Newton, Gunhand For The Bigelows
- Mercedes McCambridge as Ma Sackett
- Slim Pickens as Jack Bigelow
- Ana Alicia as Drusilla
- Wendy Rastatter as Ange Kerry
- Louis L'Amour as Himself
- Buck Taylor as Reed Carney
- Pat Buttram as Tuthill, The Banker
- Shug Fisher as Purgatorie Barkeep
- Lee de Broux as Simpson, Henchman For The Bigelows
- James Gammon as Wesley "Wes" Bigelow
- Marcy Hanson as Laura Pritts
- Frank Ramírez as Juan Torres
- Henry Capps as Boyd, Henchman For The Bigelows
- Ramon Chavez as Pete Romero
- Don Collier as L.P. Seeker
- Pam Earnhardt as Mary
- Bruce M. Fischer as Trapper
- Richard Jamison as Miner #1
- Pat Mahoney as Purgatorie Customer
- James O'Connell as Long Higgins
- Ken Plonkey as Miner #2
- Mark Wallace as Teller
- Malcolm Watt as Preacher
- Mai Gray as The Harlot
- Bill Hart as Rodale
- Brian Libby as Durango
- Kimo Owens as Fetterson
- Monique St. Pierre as Delilah
- Tom Waters as Hobes, Henchman For The Bigelows
