= Carrizo Impact Area =

Coordinates: 32°55′00″N 116°02′00″W

The Carrizo Impact Area was used by the United States Navy as an air-to-ground bombing range during World War II and the Korean War. It is in the Anza-Borrego desert in south central California and covers about 45 square miles (120 km^{2}). The majority of the range is in Anza-Borrego Desert State Park and about a third is owned by the United States Bureau of Land Management, including the Fish Creek Mountains Wilderness. The Navy currently only owns about 2 percent of the land and about 5 percent is privately owned. There are no structures or habitations within a 20-mile (32 km) radius of the site.

The range is closed to the public due to the hazard of unexploded ordnance. Bombs ranging from 3 to 1,000 pounds, rockets, 20-millimeter cartridges and 50-caliber bullets were dropped and fired on the range from 1942 until June 1959. After that, the range was only used a few times. The first clearance of material occurred during late 1959 and early 1960 and the second in January 1965. A large amount of unexploded bombs and wreckage were found. An inspection in 1970 found only detonated or non-explosive ordnance, but it took place in only one day. Additional unexploded ordnance has been found on a regular basis since then. Clearing the area of bombs is made difficult by the large number of munitions and the fact that they burrowed up to 30 feet (9.1 m) into the ground after being dropped from aircraft, although some have worked their way up to the surface through natural processes. Despite the area receiving the highest classification of hazard from unexploded ordnance, the area is considered low priority for cleanup because its remote location makes it unlikely that anyone will be hurt by it.
