= Gardner's Wells Station =

Overland Mail stagecoach stop in Baja California

Coordinates: 32°35′48″N 115°09′05″W

Gardener's Wells Station was built at the site of Gardener's Wells in Baja California was one of the wells developed by the Butterfield Overland Mail, as a part of its improvements of its Colorado Desert route between Cooke's Wells Station and Alamo Mocho Station. These wells allowed travel along the level ground along the 19th century course of the Alamo River, avoiding the more difficult route up on Andrade Mesa.

Gardener's Wells Station was in operation until March 1861 when the Butterfield route was abandoned for the Central Route by the beginning of the American Civil War. However the locality remained in use as a watering place for travelers on the Southern Emigrant Trail and was a post for Union Army units moving back and forth between California and Arizona Territory. In the journal of an 1861 march of California Volunteers to Fort Yuma, Lieut. Col. Joseph R. West described the old station:

November 1.- Left Alamo Station at 4.50 p.m.; road inferior. Gardner's Wells (old mail station, but water has failed), nine miles; thence by same character of road and country to Salt or Seven Wells, and camped. Water plenty, but brackish; wood abundant. Weather warm. Distance previous, 108 miles; distance to-day, 18 miles; distance in eight days, 126 miles.

The Gardner's Well Station was in use again by stagecoach lines from 1867 until 1877 when the Southern Pacific Railroad reached Fort Yuma. It was then abandoned but the well continued in use until the river changed course in 1905.

Today Gardner's Well is located about three miles north of Querétaro, Baja California in the bed of the old Alamo River.
