= Salt or Seven Wells =

Overland Mail stagecoach stop in Baja California, Mexico

Coordinates: 32°37′25″N 115°02′02″W

Seven Wells Station was built at the site, of Salt or Seven Wells one of the wells developed by the Butterfield Overland Mail, as a part of its improvements of its Colorado Desert route between Cooke's Wells Station and Alamo Mocho Station. These wells allowed travel along the level ground along the 19th century course of the Alamo River (north of the course of the modern river), avoiding the more difficult route up on Andrade Mesa.

It was in operation until March 1861 when the Butterfield route was abandoned for the Central Route by the beginning of the American Civil War. However the locality remained in use as a watering place for travelers on the Southern Emigrant Trail and was a post for Union Army units moving back and forth between California and Arizona Territory. In the journal of an 1861 march of California Volunteers to Fort Yuma, Lieut. Col. Joseph R. West described the old station:

November 1.- Left Alamo Station at 4.50 p.m.; road inferior. Gardner's Wells (old mail station, but water has failed), nine miles; thence by same character of road and country to Salt or Seven Wells, and camped. Water plenty, but brackish; wood abundant. Weather warm. Distance previous, 108 miles; distance to-day, 18 miles; distance in eight days, 126 miles.

The Seven Wells Station was in use again by stagecoach lines from 1867 until 1877 when the Southern Pacific Railroad reached Fort Yuma. It was then abandoned but the Seven Wells continued in use until the river changed course in 1905.

Today the location of the Seven Wells site is about a mile southwest of the modern town of Bórquez Norte, Baja California.
