= Temple's Ranch =

Coordinates: 37°01′27″N 120°32′34″W

Temple's Ranch was the ranch and a home of F. P. F. Temple, a wealthy land owner in Los Angeles County, United States, with large business and land holdings comprising thousands of acres in Madera and Fresno counties, including this ranch in Fresno County near the Merced County border.

== Temple's Ranch Station ==
Temple's Ranch was a swing station in the First Division of the Butterfield Overland Mail in Fresno County, California. It was located 13 miles east southeast of Lone Willow Station and 15 miles northwest of Firebaugh's Ferry northwest of what is now Dos Palos. The station at Temple's Ranch was located on the west bank of the San Joaquin River, at the home of F. T. F. Temple, the original owner of the property, who was living there in 1858. Temple sold the ranch in 1866.

This section of the mail road along the San Joaquin River and over the plain, west through Lone Willow Station to St. Luis Ranch and Pacheco Pass was described as one of the best for making fast time on the route. The fifteen miles between Firebaugh's Ferry and Temple's Ranch was frequently driven in one hour and twelve minutes.
