= Alamo Mucho Station =

Overland Mail stagecoach stop in Baja California

Coordinates: 32°36′39″N 115°14′55″W

Alamo Mucho Station, the misspelled name of Alamo Mocho Station was one of the original Butterfield Overland Mail stations located south of the Mexican border, in Baja California. Its location is 0.5 miles south-southeast of the Mexicali International Airport Terminal building.

Alamo Mocho meant trimmed cottonwood, or a cottonwood with its branches cropped, mutilated or lopped off, something travelers in the Colorado Desert would do to obtain wood in this otherwise desolate region. A riparian species, cottonwoods are a conspicuous indicator of water at or near the surface of the ground where they occur in the desert.

== History ==
Long used by Native Americans, Spaniards and Mexican travelers on the Sonora Road, the Alamo Mocho Well was first used by American soldiers of Kearny and Cooke passing through the desert in 1847 during the Mexican–American War. If the wells had been near cottonwood trees when they first received their Spanish name, the trees were cut down long before the Americans arrived.

The diversion of the Southern Emigrant Trail and the later stage road south of the Mexican Border was due to the Algodones Dunes, extensive sand dunes located west of Fort Yuma and northwest for over 50 miles that were impassable to wheeled vehicles of the era. The route followed the Colorado River south from Fort Yuma to beyond Pilot Knob where it turned west. Here the route passed south of the dunes, following the direction of ephemeral sloughs that fed the Alamo River to the south of the route, made by the variable overflowing of the Colorado River in the spring. When it overflowed this inundation flowed west on the sloughs of Alamo River to the vicinity of Alamo Mocho Well and via the Paradones River to the volcanic lake southeast of Cerro Prieto and down the New River, up to 60 miles west of the Colorado to the vicinity of Indian Wells. In years of extraordinary flooding or if the Colorado changed course down these channels it might flow north, to the Salton Sink. Following these spring flood events, water that remained in these channels formed ponds and lakes, where water percolated into the soil before they dried out. Here wells could be sunk to obtain water even in years the channels were not flooded, in the otherwise almost waterless desert during the rest of the year. Cottonwoods, fond of water, are found along the length of the lower Colorado River and in these sloughs also.

Alamo Mocho Station was located at such a small shallow lake basin, along the course of the Alamo River, 38 miles east of Indian Wells Station, and 22 miles west of the Cooke's Wells Station. At first it provided the only water between Indian Wells on the New River and Cooke's Wells. After the mail route began to be traveled, improvements were made in the route of the road to follow the course of the river further south, providing new wells and stations between Indian Wells Station and Alamo Mocho Station at New River Station and between Alamo Mocho and Cooke's Wells Stations, at Gardner's Wells Station and Salt or Seven Wells.

In a report on his march to Fort Yuma in October, 1861, Lieutenant Colonel Joseph R. West, marched east along the mail route describes Alamo Mocho on October 31, six months after the stage line abandoned the route:

The Alamo is another old deserted mail station; there is a well thirty feet deep, affording a supply of good water. Animals can now make use of a lagoon, half a mile southwest from the house. Within 350 yards of the house the road to Fort Yuma branches off to the left; the right-hand fork leads to the Mariposa ferry, thirty-six miles, and down the Colorado thirty miles from Fort Yuma. That route can be used to advantage by any one acquainted with the water lagoons, which are in thickets off the road and hard to find by strangers.

== The site today ==
Agricultural development and the canalizing of the Colorado and Alamo River waters, during the twentieth century in Mexico, have completely obscured the site of the station.
