= Delos Bennett Sackett =

United States Army general (1822–1885)

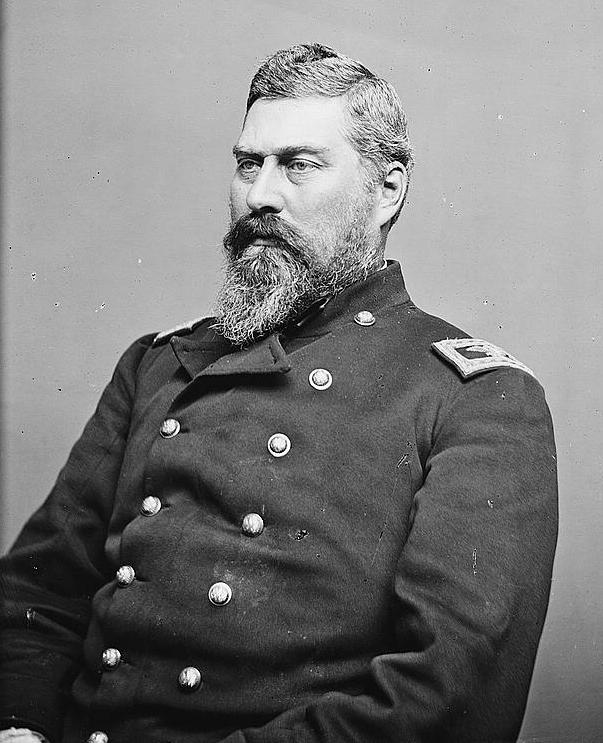
- Born: April 14, 1822; Cape Vincent, New York
- Died: March 8, 1885 (aged 62); Washington, D.C.
- Burial place: Cape Vincent, New York
- Military career
- Allegiance: United States of America; Union
- Branch: United States Army; Union Army
- Service years: 1845–1885
- Rank: Brigadier General; Bvt. Major General
- Commands: Inspector General, Army of the Potomac; Inspector General of the U.S. Army
- Conflicts: Mexican–American War; Battle of Palo Alto; Battle of Resaca de la Palma; American Indian Wars; American Civil War; Peninsula Campaign; Maryland Campaign; Battle of Fredericksburg

Delos Bennett Sackett (April 14, 1822 – March 8, 1885) was a career officer in the United States Army, and served in the American Civil War as a colonel in the Union Army. Later he became the Inspector General of the U.S. Army.

== Early life and career ==
Sackett (spelled Sacket in some army records) was born in Cape Vincent, New York. He graduated the United States Military Academy in 1845. As a lieutenant in the 2nd Dragoons, he was assigned to duty in Texas and then in the Mexican–American War. He was cited for gallantry for his actions at the battles of Palo Alto and Resaca de la Palma.

He plotted out 84 city blocks with stakes and rawhide rope, as the foundation of what is now Las Cruces, New Mexico. In 1848, during the summer, he was with 87 soldiers of the First Dragoons of Company H, charged with defending homesteads from Apache raids. El Paso, Texas, was one of these communities protected by Sackett's force. While scouting against the Apache Indians in 1850, he won special distinction from his superiors as "an active and gallant officer." Sackett married a Cherokee girl, Amanda Fields. The couple had a daughter, but Mrs. Sackett died in August 1849 in Arkansas while her husband was serving on the frontier.

In December 1850, Sackett returned to West Point as Assistant Instructor of Cavalry Tactics, serving until April 1855. With the rank of captain in the 1st U.S. Cavalry, he went to Kansas Territory to Fort Leavenworth and served on various expeditions against hostile Indians. He then served on a variety of posts around the country and took a leave of absence for an extended trip to Europe. He was serving in the Indian Territory when the Civil War erupted.

== Civil War ==
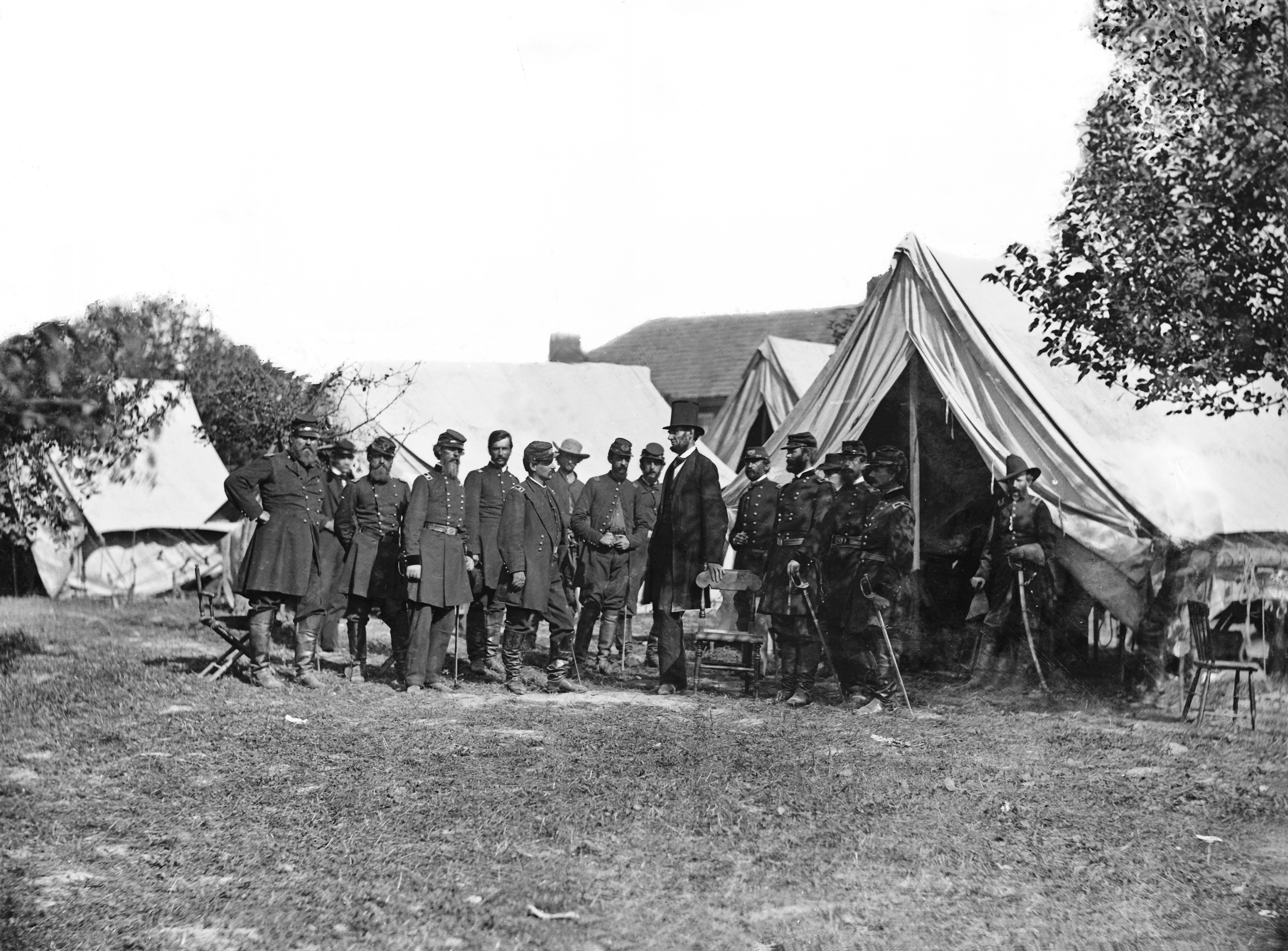
Col. Delos B. Sackett (extreme left) with President Lincoln, George B. McClellan and other officers after the Battle of Antietam, 1862.

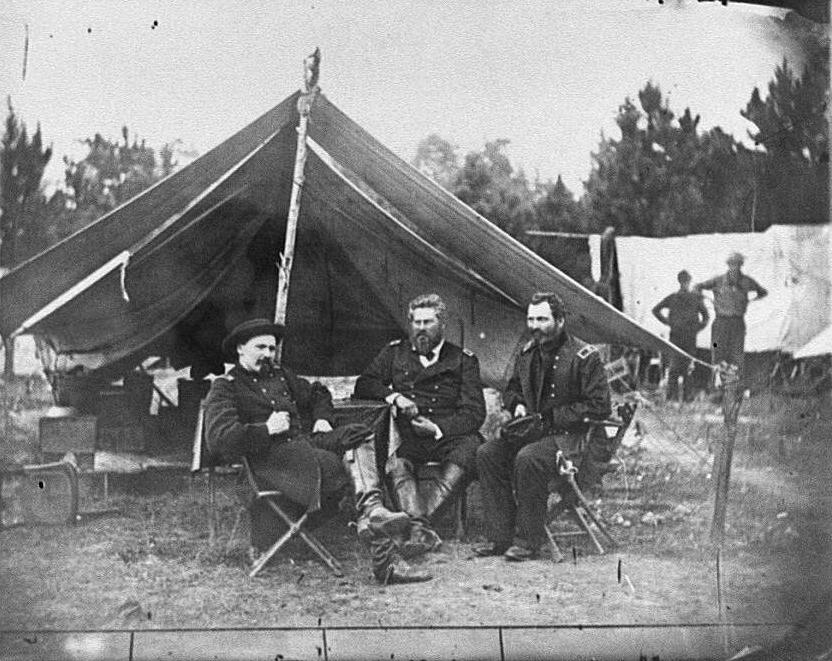
Colonel Sackett (seated center) with Colonel Albert V. Colburn and General John Sedgwick in Harrison's Landing, Virginia, during the Peninsula Campaign, 1862.

At the outset of the war, Sackett, then the lieutenant colonel of the 5th U.S. Cavalry, was assigned to Washington, D.C. as the Acting Inspector-General of the Department of Washington. He held that position until August 1861, when he was reassigned as the Mustering and Disbursing Officer for New York City until December, spending much of his time helping to organize newly recruited troops. In late December, he joined the Army of the Potomac as its Inspector General, serving in that role until January 1863. He was in the Peninsula Campaign as a staff officer and advisor to Maj. Gen. George B. McClellan and again during the Maryland Campaign. After serving under Maj. Gen. Ambrose Burnside at Fredericksburg, Sackett took command of the Inspector General's Office in Washington.

He then served on a variety of military boards (helping to organize the Invalid Corps) until April 1864, when he was sent to the Western Theater on inspection duty for the Departments of the Tennessee, Cumberland, Arkansas, and New Mexico. On December 3, 1867, President Andrew Johnson nominated Sackett for appointment to the grade of brevet major general in the regular army, to rank from March 13, 1865, for "faithful and meritorious services during the Rebellion," and the United States Senate confirmed the appointment on February 14, 1868.

== Postwar career ==
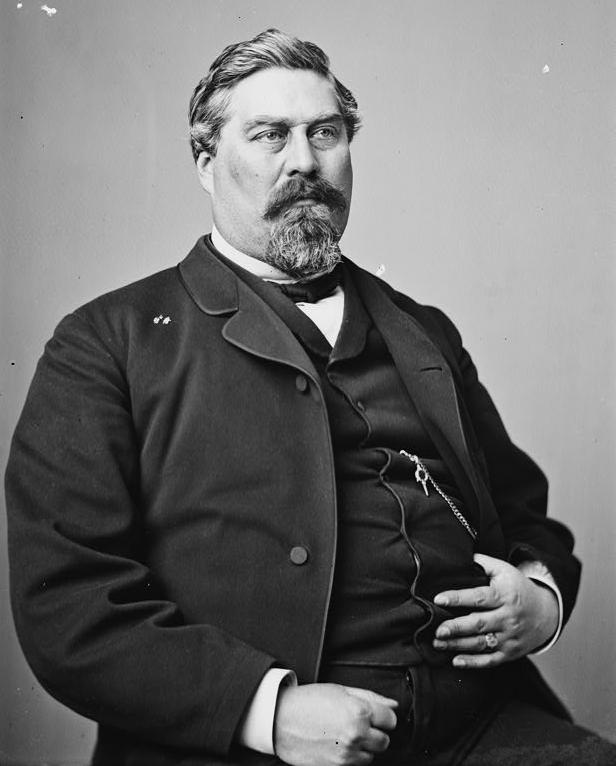
Delos B. Sackett after the war.

After spending a year in New York City awaiting orders, Sackett was sent to the Montana Territory on an inspection tour, and then went on to the Pacific Coast. He was then assigned as Inspector General of the Department of the Tennessee from November 1866 through to March 1867. He served in the same role in a variety of posts until 1881, when he returned to Washington as a brigadier general and Inspector General of the U.S. Army, a post he held until his death in Washington at the age of 62 of gangrene.

He was buried in his native Cape Vincent, where he had built an impressive house in 1872.

Post # 268 of the Grand Army of the Republic in Cape Vincent was named for Delos B. Sackett. Camp Sackett was a United States military camp located about 3.5 miles southwest of Lecompton, Kansas. It served as a temporary prison for free state advocates, including Governor Charles L. Robinson, during the Bleeding Kansas issue in 1856.

== See also ==
- List of American Civil War brevet generals (Union)

== Notes ==
Military offices
Preceded by Randolph B. Marcy	Inspector General of the U. S. Army; January 2, 1881-March 8, 1885	Succeeded by Nelson H. Davis
