= New River Station =

Overland Mail stagecoach stop in California

Coordinates: 32°36′49″N 115°27′15″W

New River Station was a later station added into the Colorado Desert route of the Butterfield Overland Mail it was located 15 miles southeast of Indian Wells Station and 14 miles west of Alamo Mocho Station beside the New River. It was in operation until March 1861 when the Butterfield route was abandoned for the Central Route by the beginning of the American Civil War.

However the locality remained in use as a watering place for travelers on the Southern Emigrant Trail and was a post for Union Army units moving back and forth between California and Arizona Territory. In the journal of an 1861 march of California Volunteers to Fort Yuma, Lieut. Col. Joseph R. West described the old station:

October 30.- ... At New River, old mail station, deserted. Deep well of inferior water; a lagoon within 400 yards now affords a supply, but would fail after a long spell of dry weather; it cannot be relied upon. This station is a precarious one for water.

The New River Station was in use again by stagecoach lines from 1867 until 1877 when the Southern Pacific Railroad reached Fort Yuma. It was then abandoned.

Its location was probably in what is now Colonia Hidalgo, Mexicali beside the New River. Its location remains imprecise because the great flood of the Colorado River in 1905 dramatically transformed the landscape along the New River washing away this station site as well as that at Indian Wells.
