= Indian Wells, Imperial County, California =

Historic site in the U.S. state of California

Coordinates: 32°44′03″N 115°37′11″W

Indian Wells is a former settlement in Imperial County, California. It was located 8 miles (13 km) south-southwest of present-day Seeley.

During the 19th century, Indian Wells was a watering place between two small lakes on the New River discovered by the Kearny and Cooke Expeditions in 1846. They were subsequently used during the California gold rush as a watering place on the Southern Emigrant Trail crossing the arid Colorado Desert. Its location is described by the 1854–1855 Railroad Expedition report:

From Sackett's to the Colorado river the desert appears to the unaided eye a perfect level, but it is shown to be undulating, and composed of several gentle slopes or swells of surface rising to a level terrace in the vicinity of Alamo Mocho. The two "lagoons" on the desert being now dry, water is obtained from a well dug in the channel which connects them, at a point about half way between, and 14.5 miles from Sackett's. This watering place is known by the name of "Indian Wells." The water is at a depth of about 30 feet, and is of tolerable quality. From here to Alamo Mocho is a stretch of 20 miles without water, over a surface generally even and free of obstructions."

Indian Wells was a stop on the Butterfield Overland Stage line. The Indian Wells post office, located 10 miles (16 km) west of present-day El Centro, operated from 1876 to 1877. The site of Indian Wells was obliterated by the 1906 flood of the New River, when the Colorado River changed course and filled the Salton Sea, scouring a deeper and wider channel for the New River.
