= Sackett's Wells, California =

Sackett's Wells
- Former settlement
- Interactive map of Sackett's Wells
- Coordinates: 32°48′13″N 115°53′39″W
- Country: United States
- State: California
- County: Imperial County
- Region: Colorado Desert

Sackett's Wells is a former settlement in Imperial County, California. It was located 3 miles (4.8 km) west northwest of Plaster City, in or near Coyote Wash.

== History ==
The springs were probably used as a watering place by local indigenous peoples of California, and in the latter 18th century by colonial Spanish and Mexican explorers from the Viceroyalty of New Spain to Las Californias province, and 19th century Mexican settlers and travelers from Sonora to Alta California.

=== American period ===
They were certainly used from the time of the Mexican American War when they were a watering place for the expeditions of Kearny and Cooke, and other travelers crossing the Colorado Desert westward from the Colorado River. When the Southern Emigrant Trail was established from the Yuma Crossing to Los Angeles, they were one of the watering places used.

John Russell Bartlett, described Sackett's Wells in his 1854 book A Personal Narrative of Explorations and Incidents in Texas, New Mexico, California, Sonora and Chihuahua:

June 5th. Reached the water-holes called Sackett's Wells, twenty-four miles from Carrizo, at 3 o'clock this morning. Before leaving camp last night, I sent four men with spades in advance, in order that they might sink some holes, and have a small supply of water for us on our arrival; but as they were ignorant of the place and were unfamiliar with the best indications of water, they had accomplished little. Some more experienced hands now set themselves busily at work in an arroyo, or place where there was a slight depression in the desert, marked by some mezquit bushes, whose freshness showed that water sometimes reached their roots. After digging about six feet, the water began slowly to enter; and by dipping it up with a basin, we managed to supply our animals. The desert where we were now encamped, is an open and remarkably level plain, with scarcely an undulation. On the south-west, twenty miles distant, is a range of lofty mountains, which forms its limit in that direction. On the north and east, it is bounded by the horizon, no mountains or hills being visible. The soil is either a fine gravel, or loose sand. The vegetation is exceedingly sparse, consisting chiefly of stunted mezquit and the larrea Mexicana. Near the arroyo, where water sometimes finds its way, a few mezquit bushes have attained the height of ten feet, whose brilliant hue is most agreeable to the eye, amid so much barrenness. A little grass was found in clumps about a mile from our camp in an arroyo, whither our animals were sent. This, with the young shoots of the mezquit, was all they had. At sunrise this morning, the mercury stood at 92°, and at noon 108° in the shade. Distance from Carrizo Creek, twenty-five miles.

==== Butterfield Overland Mail station ====
In 1858, the Butterfield Overland Mail established a stage station there at the well, located 17.5 miles (28.2 km) southeast of Carrizo Creek Station and 15 miles (24 km) northwest of Indian Wells Station.

At the beginning of the American Civil War the mail stations were abandoned but the wells continued to be used by the Union Army and other travelers. After the Civil War Sackett's Wells was again used for a station and watering place for other stage companies on the route between California and Arizona Territory, until the route fell into disuse in the late 1870s with the arrival of the railroad in Yuma, Arizona.

The exact location has been lost. A 1925 newspaper interview with former state driver John McCain described the site:

From Warner's down to the desolate stations of San Felipe, Vallecitos, Carrizo and the lost Sackett's Well, he hauled hay and supplies. There are very few men alive today who saw the old transcontinental stages running as did John MoCain. The stages never stopped, night or day, according, to McCain. A mile or so from each station, the driver would sound a horn, and a fresh team was waiting, ready and harnessed when the stage pulled up. Ofter the driver never left his seat. They were men of iron, too, for one driver took the stage regularly from Yuma to Sackett's Well, almost a 24-hour session on the swaying seat of the stage, through the heat and dust of the most terrible portion of the desert run. The station at Sackett's Well was destroyed by a terrific sand storm after the stage lines stopped running. So completely did the storm erase all traces of the station that it has never been located to this day. John McCain says he can find it and the rediscovery of its shallow water would make desert travel safer in that region between Dixieland and Carrizo.

— San Pedro News Pilot, 1925

== In popular literature ==
The author Louis L'Amour, known for his stories and novels about the Old West, refers to Sackett's Well in his book The Sackett Companion. Many of his books tell stories about different fictional members of the Sackett family as they immigrate from England to the New World and settle, then move west as the narratives progress in time. Because of the interest that his fans held for the Sackett family, he wrote The Sackett Companion to help his readers understand the many relationships and events involving this family. Mr. L'Amour states that he took the family name from Sackett's Well.

In The Sackett Companion, Mr. L'Amour tells that he had occasion to search for and locate Sackett's Well. He states that Arthur Woodward credited the well's name to Russell Sackett, a stageline station keeper. But Mr. L'Amour believed the water hole was discovered by Lt. Delos B. Sackett, thus saving his expedition's mules.

== See also ==
- Butterfield Overland Mail in California
- Yaqui Well
