= Cooke's Wells Station =

Overland Mail stagecoach stop in Baja California, Mexico

Coordinates: 32°40′10″N 114°55′35″W

Cooke's Wells Station a stage station of the Butterfeild Overland Mail, located south of the Mexican border, in the old Alamos River bed, about 1 km west northwest of Mérida, Baja California. Its site was at Cooke's Wells, named for Philip St. George Cooke whose expedition found them in 1847. It was at first the only water source 22 miles (35 km) east of Alamo Mucho Station and 18 miles (29 km) west of the Pilot Knob Station on the Southern Emigrant Trail.

Cooke's Wells were fed by spring flooding from the Colorado River along the course of the Alamo River that sank into the ground or formed small pools or lakes along its course that could provide water in the otherwise dry region. Later the stage company established two other stations in similar locations on the river west of Cooke's Wells, at Gardner's Wells Station 9 miles (14 km) east of Alamo Mucho and at Salt or Seven Wells 9 miles (14 km) east of Gardner's Wells and 4 miles (6.4 km) west of Cooke's Wells.
