= Lone Willow Station =

Former settlement in California

Coordinates: 37°4′39″N 120°47′29″W

- Interactive map of Lone Willow Station

Lone Willow Station was a former settlement in Merced County, California, United States, located near present-day Los Banos.

== Background ==
Lone Willow Station was a changing or swing station along the First Division route of the Butterfield Overland Mail, from 1858 to 1861. Lone Willow Station was located on the west bank of Mud Slough, 18 miles east of the St. Louis Ranch Station and 13 miles northwest of Temple's Ranch Station. This station consisted of a house for the hostler and a large barn for the relay horses and storage of their barley and hay.
