= Green Valley, (Cuyamaca Mountains, California) =

Valley in San Diego County, California

Coordinates: 32°54′24″N 116°34′54″W

Green Valley is a valley in the Cuyamaca Mountains in San Diego County, California. The Sweetwater River flows through Green Valley, and has its source at the top of Upper Green Valley.

== History ==
Green Valley was the site of Lassiter's Ranch, used as a stop on the San Antonio-San Diego Mail Line. Mules carried passengers 18 miles up and down Upper Green Valley, Oriflamme Canyon, Vallecito Wash, Vallecito Creek and Carrizo Creek between the ranch and Carrizo Creek Station. From the ranch, they could ride or take a coach through Julian's Ranch, Williams' Ranch, Ames' Ranch, Mission San Diego, 67 miles to San Diego.

The coaches with baggage and other passengers staying with the coaches took the Southern Emigrant Trail to Rancho Valle de San Felipe through Warner Pass and then followed the old wagon road to San Diego from Warner's Ranch via San Ysabel, Rancho Santa María, San Pasqual and Rancho Peñasquitos.
