= Upper Green Valley =

Valley in California, United States

Upper Green Valley is a valley in the Cuyamaca Mountains in San Diego County, California. Its mouth lies at an elevation of 4,163 feet / 1,269 meters. Its head is at 32°59′03″N 116°32′01″W, at an elevation of 4,890 feet. The Sweetwater River has its source at the top of Upper Green Valley.

== History ==
Upper Green Valley was a part of a pathway between the California coast in the vicinity of San Diego and the Colorado River. U.S. Army couriers used it during and after the Mexican–American War. As part of the San Antonio–San Diego Mail Line, mules carried passengers 18 miles up and down Upper Green Valley, Oriflamme Canyon, Vallecito Wash, Vallecito Creek and Carrizo Creek between Lassiter's Ranch and Carrizo Creek Station.
