= Vallecito, San Diego County, California =

Former settlement in the United States

Vallecito
- Vallecito Stage Station County Park
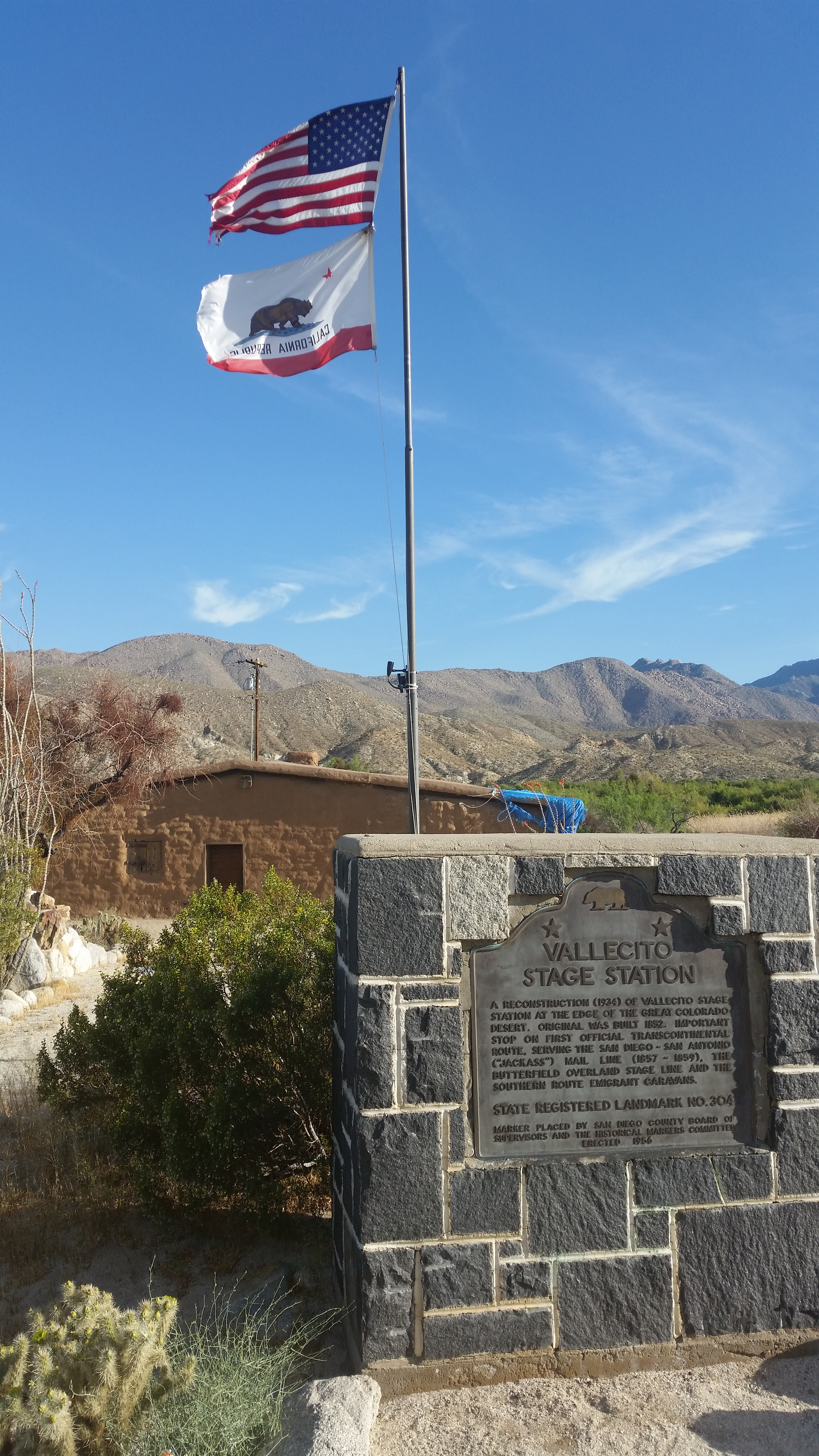
- Vallecito Stage Station historical marker (2017)

- Location within California
- Location: San Diego County, California, U.S.
- Nearest city: Agua Caliente Springs, California
- Coordinates: 32°58′34″N 116°21′1″W
- Operator: San Diego County
- Former settlement
- Nickname: Vallecitas
- Interactive map of Vallecito, San Diego County, California
- Established: November 1850
- Elevation: 474 m (1,555 ft)

California Historical Landmark
- Official name: Vallecito Stage Station
- Reference no.: 304

Vallecito, in San Diego County, California, is an oasis of cienegas and salt grass along Vallecito Creek and a former Kumeyaay settlement on the edge of the Colorado Desert in the Vallecito Valley. Its Spanish name is translated as "little valley". Vallecito was located at the apex of the gap in the Carrizo Badlands created by Carrizo Creek and its wash in its lower reach, to which Vallecito Creek is a tributary. The springs of Vallecito, like many in the vicinity, are a product of the faults that run along the base of the Peninsular Ranges to the west.

Once a seasonal village of the native Kumeyaay people, on a trail across the desert from the Colorado River, this oasis became a crucial stopping place for Spanish and then Mexican travelers to recover from the desert crossing between Sonora and New Mexico to California. Later it also served the same function for American soldiers, 49ers and their herds of animals being driven to the goldfields on the Southern Emigrant Trail.

The non native settlement of the site began in 1850 as a camp with a one-room sod warehouse as the U.S. Army Depot Vallecito for the supply of Fort Yuma. It was later increased in size and became a store, a stage station, and a ranch house. Eventually reduced to ruins, the Station house was restored in 1934 and is now the site of Vallecito Stage Station County Park.

Documented Native trails exist from Laguna Mountains to the Preserve area. Three important, extensive, and highly sensitive Kumeyaay village sites occur within the area. Important named location on Southern Overland Trail – travel corridor from the Colorado River to coastal California. Used from prehistoric times to present by indigenous Peoples, explorers, Mexicans, Europeans, early U.S. military, mail, pioneer settlers in wagons, stage coaches, gold-seekers, cattlemen, ranchers, and other pioneer travelers. Area is adjacent to Vallecito Butterfield Stage-Overland Mail Station in San Diego County Park. 19th century homestead of James E. Mason (Mason Valley). Olin-Bailey Earthen Structure (rammed earth) of early 20th century; protective shelter recently constructed (Prop 84 funds allocated for stabilization of the structure, interpretation, and fencing). Campbell Ranch Historic Complex of mid-20th century; eligible for National Register as an Historic District.

== History ==
=== Hawi Oasis ===
Once a seasonal village of the native Kumeyaay people, called Hawi, Hawi was in the Vallecito Valley on a trail between the Quechan peoples on the Colorado River and the Kumeyaay of the coastal San Diego area. After crossing the desert from Hawi, the trail ran up Oriflamme Canyon to Cañada Verde, (or Green Valley as it came to be called by later American settlers) in the Cuyamaca Mountains. From there, it ran down the western slope to the coast following the Sweetwater River. Hawi was used by the Kumeyaay into the 19th century.

The waters of the Vallecito oasis were described by the geological report of the 1854-55 railroad survey expedition:

The water at Vallecitas is hard and sulphurous, but not unpleasant to the taste. As many as twenty springs are concentrated near the camping ground; these ooze out gently, flow down a few yards as a small stream, and then sink into the soil.

The first European to visit Vallecito was the Spanish Captain, Pedro Fages, in 1781. Subsequently, named Vallecito, its abundance of water and green grass was an oasis for Spanish and later Mexican travelers from Sonora and New Mexico and their animals to recover after emerging from their travel across the dry, barren Colorado Desert. In 1846, Colonel Stephen Watts Kearny and his dragoons with their scout Kit Carson passed through Vallecito on their route from New Mexico to California. Soon afterward, Lt. Colonel Philip St. George Cooke and the Mormon Battalion followed Kearny, establishing the first wagon road across the Southwest into California. This wagon road passed through Vallecito to the northwest through Warner Pass, then to Santa Ysabel, and on to San Diego. It became known as Cooke's Wagon Road. Later during the California Gold Rush most of it became the route of the Southern Immigrant Trail.

The Southern Immigrant Trail became the highway for the Forty-Niners to California; it was also a major route for herds of cattle and sheep from Texas and New Mexico on their way to the goldfields. The water and grass of Vallecito saved herds desperate for water and grazing after their crossing of the desert. Large numbers of animals were driven on this route from 1849 to the late 1870s when the railroads came to Fort Yuma. However, herds were still driven on the route as late as 1919.

=== Army Camp and Depot Vallecito ===
In November 1850, United States Army Captain Samuel P. Heintzelman ordered a company of the 2nd Infantry to march to Vallecito Valley to build a post with a warehouse as a supply depot for the expedition he was taking to the post; he was going to establish at the Yuma Crossing to protect the area from outlaws and hostile natives. They built a camp and a one-room sod building near a spring in the Vallicito Valley as a U. S. Army depot, supporting the building and supply of Fort Yuma.

After 1851, the fort was partially supplied by sea from Robinson's Landing at the mouth of the Colorado River in Sonora, Mexico, from which cargo was brought northward to the fort overland. But the depot remained in use until 1853 when a steamboat was put into service on the Lower Colorado River to bring up cargo from the landing at its mouth. Now obsolete, the Vallecito post was abandoned by the Army.

=== Lassator's Ranch ===
The sod building of Depot Vallecito was subsequently taken over in 1854 and expanded by a settler named James Ruler Lassator (also spelled Lassiter and Lassitor in various public records and secondary sources) and lived there with his wife Sarah and his stepsons, Andrew and John Mulkins. The Lassators raised their children there, operated a store, and provided a campground for travelers coming across the Colorado Desert in the Southern Immigrant Trail.

Between 1854 and 1857, military couriers taking mail between San Diego and Fort Yuma used the old native route through Vallecito and Green Valley. In 1857, Lassator and his stepson John Mulkins also began a 160-acre ranch in Green Valley in the Cuyamaca Mountains to the west of Vallecito. There they raised livestock and cut hay at the ranch, providing livestock and feed for sale for travelers at Vallecito. Lassitor's Green Valley ranch became a rest stop on the trail. Lassator's Green Valley ranch became his home and the site for annual rodeos after he was appointed Judge of the Plains for Agua Caliente Township.

=== Vallicito Stage Station ===
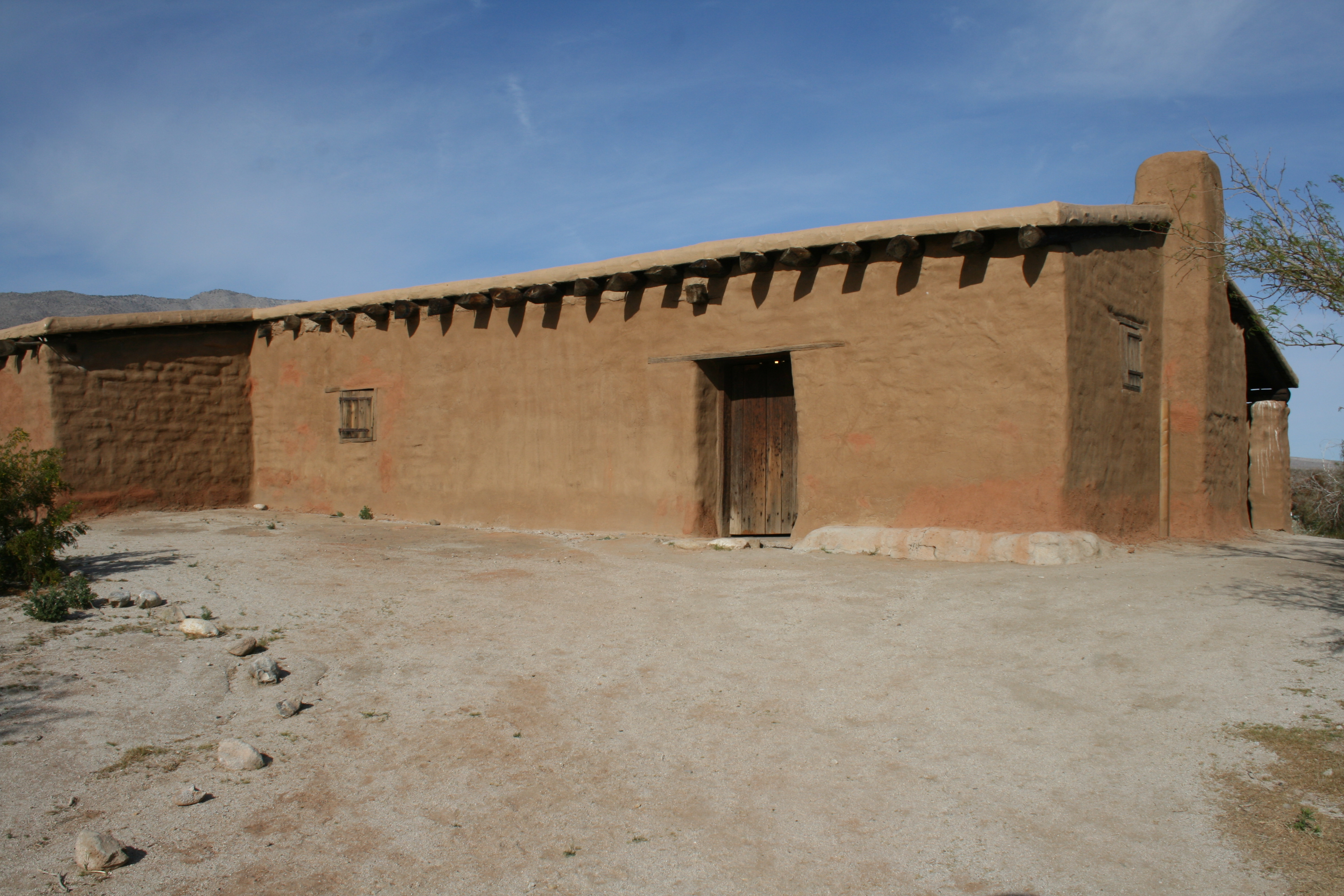
The restored Vallecito Stage Station

In 1857, Vallecito and Lassitor's Green Valley ranch became a stops on the San Antonio-San Diego Mail Line that at first used the old Native American route to San Diego via Julian Sandoval's Ranch, Williams Ranch, Ames Ranch and Mission San Diego. Travelers willing to take mules could descend or ascend Oriflamme Canyon between Lassitor's Green Valley ranch and Carrizo Creek Station. Others staying with coaches took the Southern Immigrant Trail to Rancho Valle de San Felipe and Warner Pass and then followed the old wagon road to San Diego from Warner's Ranch via San Ysabel, Rancho Santa María, San Pasqual and Rancho Peñasquitos.

When the Butterfield Overland Mail took over the mail route, its route was changed northward to Los Angeles. However, Lassiter was the agent in charge of Vallecito Stage Station and the stations at Palm Springs and Carrizo Springs.

Vallecito the other stations functioned as a changing or "swing" station that replaced teams with fresh horses. Most had a single keeper, a hostler who took care of the livestock and, with the driver, changed the teams. Vallecito was an exception; pasturing livestock for other desert changing stations, it had two hostlers providing meals, a cook, and a merchant residing at the store there. The main Division station on the route was the next one to the north at San Felipe Station.

In 1861, the Butterfield Overland Mail route shut down due to the American Civil War. No stage line was to run on the route for the duration of the war, and not until 1867 did they resume. But Lassator's station was used as a camp and as a grazing and water stop by the Union Army and other travelers to and from Arizona Territory. While prospecting in Arizona in 1863, James Lassator was murdered and the Vallecito ranch became the property of John Mulkins.

John Hart purchased the old Vallecito Station shortly after Lassitor's death, and ran it with his wife. Several short-lived stage lines that ran from Los Angeles and San Bernardino to Arizona used Vallecito, as well as most of the other old overland mail stations. John Hart died in 1867 at the age of 31 and was buried in the station cemetery, next to the mysterious Lady in White. She had been a female passenger on one of the old Butterfield Mail coaches who had become gravely ill, and died there at the station overnight. Finding no identification but a white wedding dress, the station staff dressed her in it and buried her 100 feet from the station.

A few months later, Hart's widow married John C. Wilson, a stage driver. Vallecito was a station for other stage companies until 1877 when the railroad replaced the stagecoach for long-distance travel between California and Arizona. Completion of the Southern Pacific Railroad between Los Angeles and Yuma in 1877 ended the large scale use of the Southern Emigrant Trail. Hart's widow abandoned the station in the late 1870s.

=== Vallecito Ranches ===
Charles Ayres, a former postmaster at Warner's Ranch from 1870 to 1875, and his family settled at the abandoned station of Vallecito where he raised cattle and mules. James E. Mason visited the area on a prospecting trip in 1878 and settled at Vallecito, keeping cattle with Ayers' livestock. In 1879 Mason filed a homestead claim on 160 acres that included the stage station, receiving a patent on November 1, 1884. A year later, Charles Ayres abandoned his wife and children. His wife, Jesusa Ayres, obtained a divorce in 1888, and then married James Mason. The couple then sold their Vallecito homestead to Christian F. Holland, Jesusa's San Diego divorce lawyer. A few years later Holland acquired 640 acres in the center of the valley and rented these properties to area ranchers or cattle companies who used the area for winter pasture. Mason and his wife moved up to the next valley near some springs to start another ranch in what became known as Mason Valley. In 1931, Mason died and now lies in the last of the three graves at Vallecito Stage Station Cemetery.

=== Vallecito County Park ===
In 1934 Holland deeded six acres along with the dilapidated Vallecito stage station to the County of San Diego. With funds from the county and State Emergency Relief Agency, a nearby rancher Everett Campbell supervised the reconstruction of the old stage station. Today the 1934 reconstruction of the historic Butterfield Stage Station is now the centerpiece of a 71-acre County Park.

== See also ==
- California Historical Landmarks in San Diego County
- Palm Spring, San Diego County, California
