= San Felipe Creek (Salton Sea) =

River in the United States of America

San Felipe Creek is a stream in Imperial and San Diego Counties of California. It arises in the Volcan Mountains of San Diego County 33°11′57″N 116°37′35″W, and runs eastward, gathering the waters of most of the eastern slope of the mountains and desert of the county in the San Sebastian Marsh before it empties into the Salton Sea. It is probably the last remaining perennial natural desert stream in the Colorado Desert region. In 1974, the San Felipe Creek Area was designated as a National Natural Landmark by the National Park Service.

Parts of the land around the creek are owned by the Bureau of Land Management (classified as an Area of Critical Environmental Concern) and the California Department of Fish and Wildlife (as an Ecological Reserve).

== Watershed of San Felipe Creek ==
- San Felipe Creek
  - Carrizo Creek, Carrizo Wash
    - Barret Canyon
    - Deguynos Canyon
      - Gert Wash
      - Red Rock Canyon (Deguynos Canyon)
    - Vallecito Creek, Vallecito Wash
      - Alma Wash
      - Arroyo Seco del Diablo
      - Arroyo Tapiado
      - Arroyo Hueso
      - Canebreak Wash
        - North Wash
      - June Wash
      - Squaw Canyon Wash
      - Bisnaga Alta Wash
      - Smuggler Canyon
      - Storm Canyon Wash
      - Cottonwood Canyon
      - Box Canyon Wash
      - Oriflamme Canyon
      - Rodriquez Canyon
    - Bow Willow Creek
    - Rockhouse Canyon
    - Carrizo Gorge
      - Goat Canyon
    - Tule Canyon
    - Walker Canyon (Carrizo Creek)
  - Tarantula Wash
  - Fish Creek Wash
  - Palo Verde Wash
  - Harper Canyon Wash
  - Fault Wash
  - Third Wash
  - Big Wash
  - Hills of the Moon Wash
  - Rainbow Wash
  - Borrego Sink Wash
    - Borrego Sink
      - Culp Canyon Wash
        - Tubb Canyon
      - Borrego Palm Canyon Wash
        - Hellhole Canyon
        - Henderson Canyon
        - Borrego Palm Canyon
      - Coyote Creek
        - Indian Creek
        - Salvadore Canyon Creek
        - Alder Canyon Creek
        - Horse Canyon Creek
        - Tule Canyon Creek
        - Alder Canyon Creek
        - Nance Canyon Creek
  - Pinyon Wash
    - Bighorn Wash
    - Nolina Wash
  - Mine Wash
  - Chuckwalla Wash
  - Grapevine Canyon
    - Bitter Creek Canyon
  - Banner Creek
