= Palm Spring Station =

Overland Mail stagecoach stop in California

Coordinates: 32°55′11″N 116°13′05″W

Palm Spring Station is a former Butterfield Overland Mail stagecoach station located at Palm Spring in San Diego County, California. This station built in 1858 by division agent, Warren F. Hall is commemorated by California State Historical Marker Number 639 Palm Spring.

== History ==
Palm Spring, a desert oasis amidst a mesquite thicket and a few palms close to Carrizo Creek, was a popular camping spot on the Southern Emigrant Trail during the California Gold Rush. It became a water stop for the San Antonio-San Diego Mail Line in 1857 and a stage station site for the Butterfield Overland Mail Company in 1858. Located 9 miles east of Vallecito stage station and 9 miles west of Carrizo Creek Station, it was a relay or swing station that provided water and a hostler who changed out tired coach teams with 5 horses kept there for the purpose.

Palm Spring Station continued in this role until the Butterfield line shut down in the spring of 1861. It was used by the Union Army for water for its troops and their animals forage on the road to Fort Yuma during the American Civil War. It does not seem to have been revived as a stage station, by later stage lines to Fort Yuma during their time of operation between 1867 and 1877 as most of the other Butterfield stations were, but was still a watering place.

During March and April 2001, a surface survey and remote sensing and archaeological investigations including limited shovel test pit explorations were completed. No remains of the stage station were located at the Palm Spring site. At the current time, it is unknown if or where the remains of Palm Spring Stage Station still exist. The station may have been only a tent or a brush shelter and a small corral that has left little trace after over 150 years.
