= Carrizo Valley =

Valley in San Diego County, California, United States

Carrizo Valley is a valley between the Vallecito Mountains and Carrizo Badlands to the north and the Tierra Blanca Mountains, Jacumba Mountains and Coyote Mountains on the south, in San Diego County, California. Its mouth is at an elevation or 623 feet / 190 meters. Its source is at an elevation of 1,315 feet at 32°58′07″N 116°18′37″W at the mouth of the narrow Carrizo Canyon where Vallecito Creek passes between the Tierra Blanca Mountains and Vallecito Mountains.
