= Volcanic Hills =

Volcanic Hills may refer to:

- Volcanic Hills (California) in San Diego County, California, USA
- Volcanic Hills (Nevada) in Esmeralda County, Nevada, USA

== See also ==
- Volcan Mountains in San Diego County, California, USA
- Volcanic cone, among the simplest volcanic landforms
- Volcano, a rupture in the crust of a planetary-mass object
