= San Felipe Valley, California =

Valley in California, United States

Coordinates: 33°05′51″N 116°27′48″W

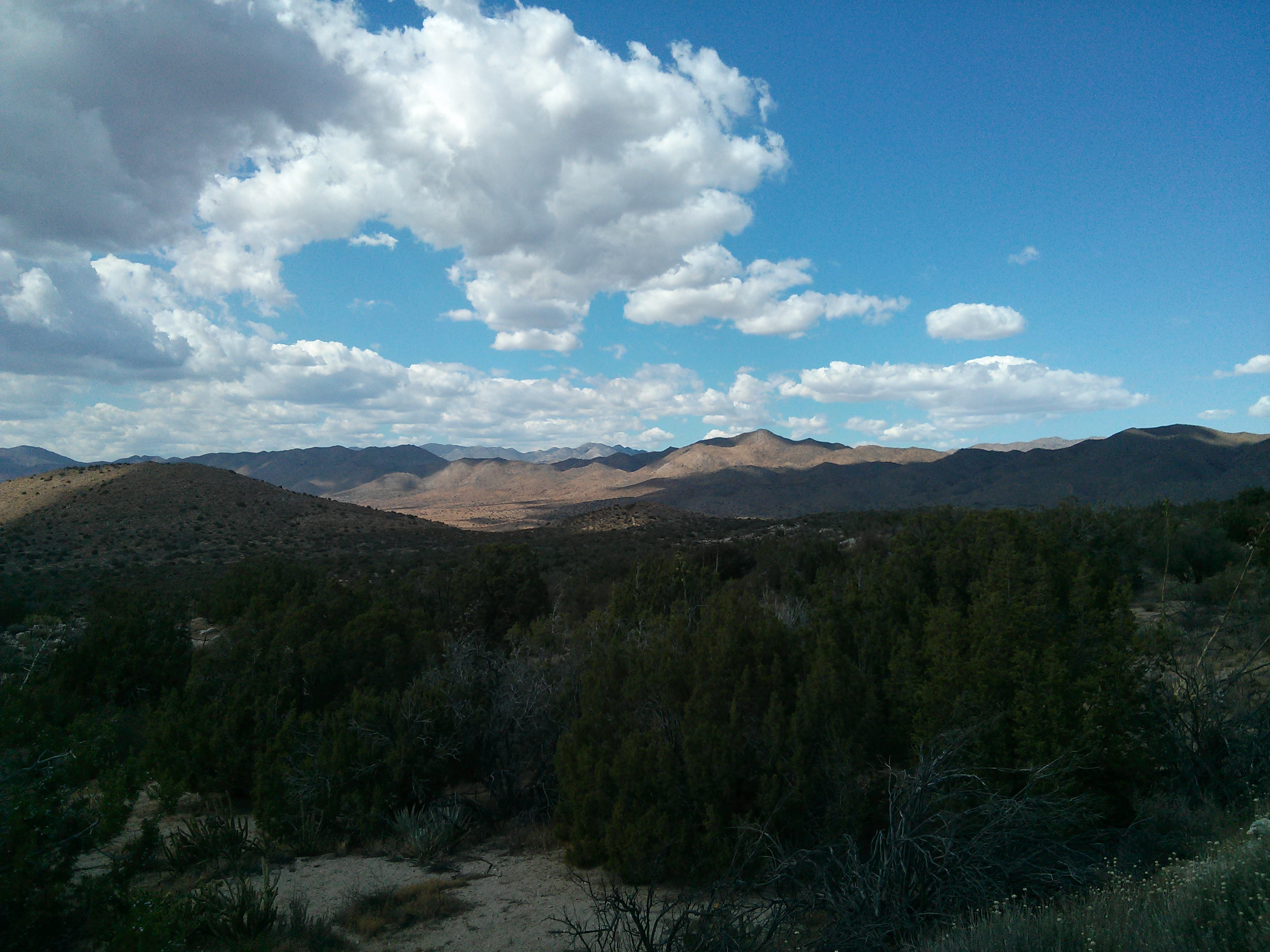
The San Felipe Valley, seen from California State Route 78.

San Felipe Valley is an inland valley of the Peninsular Ranges, located in eastern San Diego County, California. Most of the valley is protected within the San Felipe Valley Wildlife Area.

== Geography ==
The San Felipe Hills define the eastern side of the San Felipe Valley, and the Volcan Mountains define the west side.

The valley begins at the northeastern end of Earthquake Valley and extends northward. It is northeast of Anza Borrego Desert State Park and east of Julian.

California State Route 78 (east/west) and County Road S-2 (north/south) pass through the San Felipe Valley.

San Felipe Fire

On May 23, 2013 a CALFIRE controlled burn escaped containment, becoming the San Felipe Fire.

== History ==
San Felipe Valley, was home of Native American people and in the 19th century a village site was located in the valley near Scissors Crossing. The land route opened in 1828 between Sonora, Mexico and Alta California, the Sonora Road passed up the valley to Warner's Pass at the top of the valley on its way to Los Angeles.

Rancho Valle de San Felipe that encompassed much of the valley was granted in 1846 by Governor Pío Pico to Felipe Castillo.

The Sonora Road later became the route of Kearny and Cooke whose Mormon Battalion made Cooke's Wagon Road along the route from Yuma Crossing, that from 1849 was heavily traveled by Forty-niners and later immigrants to the state of California, and known as the Southern Immigrant Trail.

This was the route that from 1857 was used as a water and rest stop by the stagecoaches of San Antonio-San Diego Mail Line and from 1858 by the Butterfield Overland Mail. The Overland Mail had San Felipe Station, a major stage stop on the Butterfield Overland Mail, it being the headquarters for the Mail Agent in charge of the twelve stage stations between Warner's Ranch and Fort Yuma.

From 1861 to 1865 in the American Civil War the abandoned stage station was a military outpost of the Union Army called Camp San Filipe, a rest stop on the road between California and Fort Yuma and the Arizona and New Mexico Territories.

After the war, later stage lines from California to Arizona used the station from 1867 to 1877, before the railroad reached Fort Yuma making the stage route obsolete.

== San Felipe Valley Wildlife Area ==
The San Felipe Valley Wildlife Area is an interagency nature preserve protecting most of the valley. Primary units of the preserve were formerly the Rutherford Volcan Mountain Ranch (northern half, 6,690 acres) and the Rancho Valle de San Felipe (southern half, 7,485 acres).

Adjacent protected areas are the Volcan Mountains Wilderness Preserve Park on the west, and the Iipay Nation of Santa Ysabel Reservation on the northwest.

== See also ==
- Valleys of San Diego County, California
