= Coyote Mountains =

Mountain range in California, United States

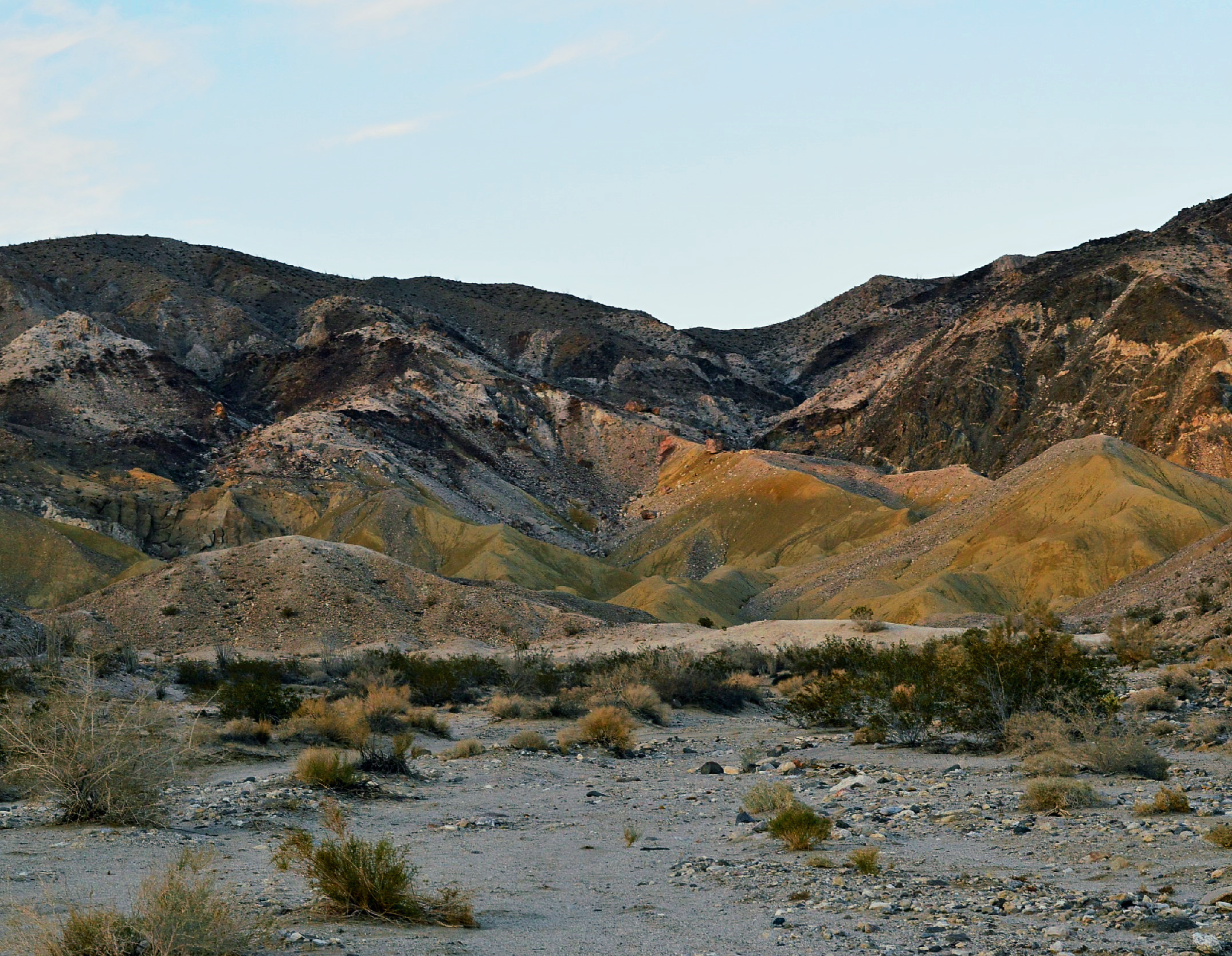

Highest point
- Peak: Carrizo Mountain
- Elevation: 734 m (2,408 ft)
- Coordinates: 32°49′31″N 116°00′55″W

Geography
- Location within California
- Country: United States
- State: California
- District(s): San Diego County and Imperial County
- Range coordinates: 32°48′41.206″N 116°4′24.049″W
- Topo map: USGS Carrizo Mountain

The Coyote Mountains are a small mountain range in San Diego and Imperial County in Southern California. The Coyotes form a narrow ESE trending 2 mi (3.2 km) wide range with a length of about 12 mi (19 km). The southeast end turns and forms a 2 mi (3.2 km) north trending "hook". The highest point is Carrizo Mountain on the northeast end with an elevation of 2,408 feet (734 m). Mine Peak at the northwest end of the range has an elevation of 1,850 ft (560 m). Coyote Wash along Interstate 8 along the southeast margin of the range is 100 to 300 feet in elevation. Plaster City lies in the Yuha Desert about 5.5 mi (8.9 km) east of the east end of the range.

To the southeast lie the Jacumba Mountains and the Volcanic Hills. To the north and northeast lie the Carrizo Badlands, the Carrizo Valley and the Fish Creek Mountains. The west end of the range is within Anza-Borrego Desert State Park and the east end is within the Carrizo Naval Gunnery Range. The international border lies approximately 11 mi (18 km) south of the southeast margin of the range.

The range consists of sand dunes left over from the ancient inland Sea of Cortez. Seismic activity has raised these. Much of the terrain is still loose dirt, interspersed with sandstone and occasional quartz veins. A dirt road leads towards the mountains, starting off State Highway 2 (S2), also known as the Imperial Highway, not far from the desert community of Ocotillo.

There are no marked trails and the footing is treacherous, made up of loose sand, dirt and crumbled shards of sandstone. Most slopes have no vegetation, but there is occasional mesquite and ocotillo, with coastal cholla at lower elevations. The local fauna includes jackrabbits and sparrows.

There are a few ancient sand dunes that have been fossilized and hollowed out by winds, producing wind caves. Marine fossils such as sand dollars and snails can be found, but it is illegal to remove any fossils. In 1994, the United States Congress designated 18,631 acres (75 km^{2}) as a U.S. Bureau of Land Management managed U.S. wilderness area, the Coyote Mountains Wilderness.

== Geology ==
The Coyote Mountains range consists of uplifted metamorphic basement rocks overlain by younger volcanic and sedimentary rocks. The peaks and mountain ranges are primarily Paleozoic and Jurassic basement rocks, which consist of marble, schist, and gneiss. This metamorphic basement rock and overlying volcanic and sedimentary rocks have been uplifted and exposed due to seismic activity along the Elsinore Fault Zone.

=== Volcanism ===
During the Miocene, around 22-14 million years ago, volcanic activity produced various volcanic rock features including basalt flows, an andesite plug, and various volcaniclastics including tuffs and breccias, known as the Alverson Formation. These volcanic rocks are primarily exposed along the east and southeastern portion of the range, and are best viewed and easily accessed in the Painted Gorge area of the range (where multiple volcanic rock types of varying colors are exhibited, giving the area a gorgeous 'painted' appearance).

=== Marine incursion ===
During the late Miocene, initiation of motion on the West Salton detachment fault caused rapid subsidence of the Salton Trough region, resulting in a marine incursion between 6.3 and 4.3 million years ago. This resulted in the Imperial Formation, composed of locally derived fossiliferous shallow marine sandstones and conglomerates that were deposited in a shallow inland sea across much of the Salton Trough. In the Coyote Mountains, these rocks were deposited directly on the older metamorphic and volcanic rocks. The Imperial Formation preserves many corals as well as shallow marine invertebrates and vertebrates.

=== Influence of the Colorado River Delta ===
The marine incursion of the ancestral Gulf of California also introduced a single, very large depositional system (the Colorado River delta) into the Salton Trough, which rapidly prograded to the south (Winker and Kidwell, 1986). During the early Pliocene, between 5 and 4.2 million years ago, this deltaic system facilitated the deposition of a thick marine deltaic sequence of mudstone and sandstone derived from the Colorado River, known as the Deguyños Formation of the Imperial Group (formerly the Imperial Formation). The Deguyños Formation represents the distal prodelta portion of the Colorado River delta, and is characterized by upward-coarsening cycles of claystone, siltstone, sandstone and/or coquina shell beds.

As the Colorado River depositional system evolved later in the Pliocene, between 4.2 and 2.8 million years ago, the marine deltaic phase gave way to a meandering fluvial system. Deposition of marine sedimentary deposits gradually transitioned into deposition of nonmarine, predominantly fluvial/delta front sediments of the Colorado river. In the Coyote Mountains, this is expressed by the presence of upward fining sequences of fine, light pink to pale orange sandstones and reddish-gray mudstones, known as the Arroyo Diablo Formation of the Palm Spring Group (previously the Diablo member of the Palm Spring Formation).

Further deposition of locally derived sediments continued to accumulate in the area between 2.8 and ≈1 million years ago, primarily manifested by the Hueso Formation. Eventually (0.95 Ma), the tectonic regime in the area changed, and basin subsidence and accumulation of sediments ceased.

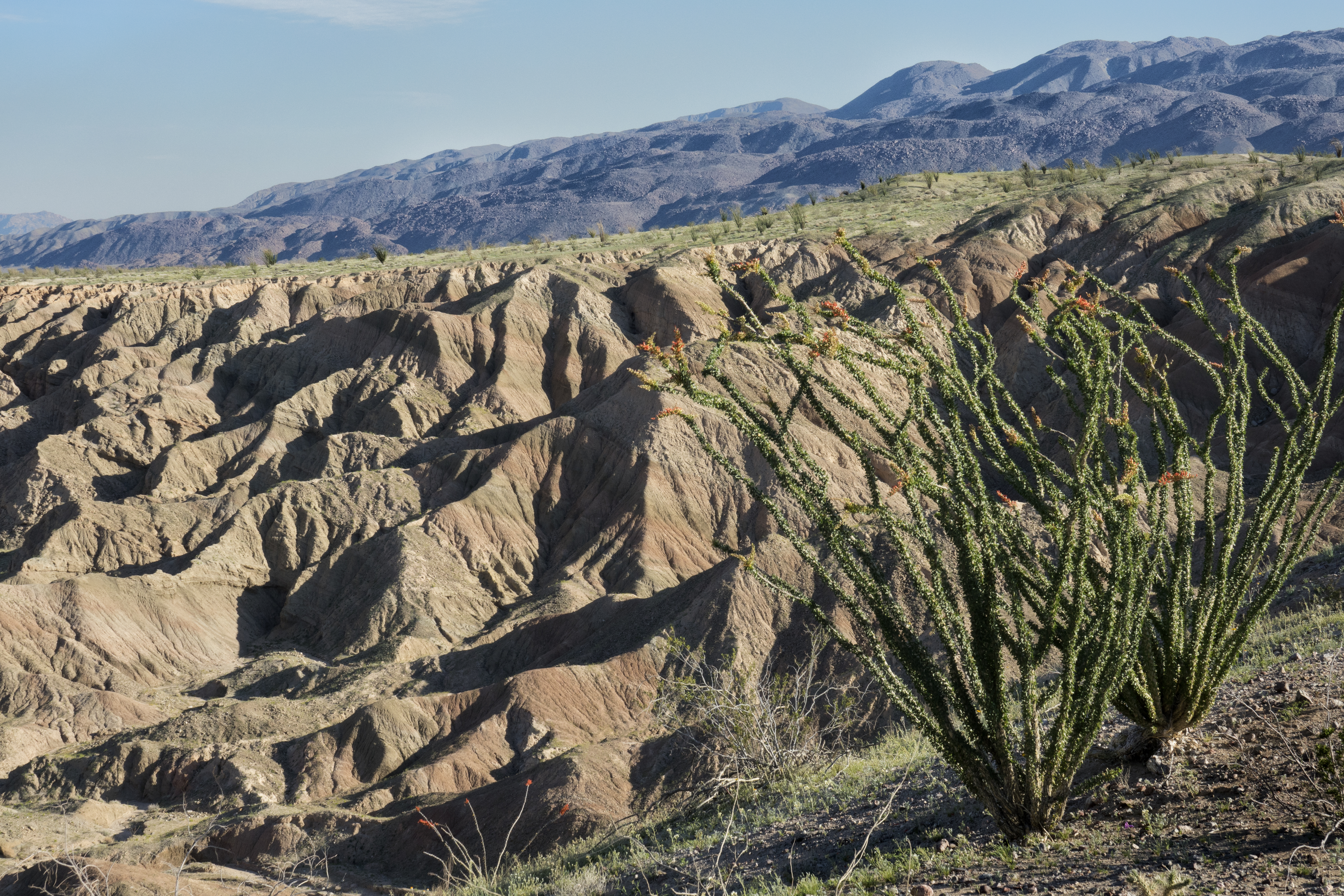
Erosion of sediments in the Coyote Mountains

=== Recent uplift ===
The Coyote Mountains lies within a complex tectonic region. The Salton Trough itself is a pull-apart basin that is the result of crustal stretching and sinking by the combined actions of the San Andreas Fault and the East Pacific Rise. Tectonism related to the North America – Pacific plate boundary is primarily manifested by the San Andreas Fault, the Elsinore Fault Zone, the Imperial Fault Zone, and the San Jacinto Fault Zone, as well as a complex system of interconnecting faults. These major right lateral strike-slip faults have transformed the region in geologically recent times. Within the last ≈1.2 million years, the Elsinore Fault Zone and its associated subordinate faults are responsible for rapidly uplifting metamorphic basement rocks and overlying volcanic and sedimentary rocks of the Coyote Mountains, revealing the complex stratigraphic record of their tectonic, climatic, and paleontological evolution. Marine fossils and sedimentary deposits that once formed in a shallow sea (ancestral Gulf of California) now sit at an elevation of over 2000 feet above sea level.

This rapid uplift has also accelerated and facilitated increased erosion and weathering. Wind and rain carve steep canyons into the recently exposed rocks, and transport loose material downslope. Gravels derived from this erosion form terraces as old as the Pleistocene and as recent as the Holocene (current epoch), which overlie all of the units in the Coyote Mountains. These terraces are further eroded and carved into by a system of active anastomosing drainages. On the north side of the Coyote Mountains, these drainages carve into the poorly lithified sediments of the Imperial and Palm Spring Groups, forming the Carrizo Badlands. These processes are ongoing and have continued throughout the past ≈1.2 million years.

Sediments of the Imperial and Palm Spring Groups north of the Coyote Mountains are deformed by the recent uplift of the range. Brittle and ductile deformation of sediments in this area is consistent with prior interpretations of uplift and inversion of the Fish Creek–Vallecito basin as a result of initiation of the Elsinore and other strike-slip faults in the western Salton Trough ≈1.2 Ma (Dorsey et al., 2011). Continued right-lateral strike-slip motion on the Elsinore fault is accommodated by a network of ladder-like faults known as the Andradé ladder structure. This ≈7-km-wide fault structure is consistent with a zone of distributed right-lateral shear and rotation that accommodates the right-lateral deformation between the Elsinore and Painted Gorge faults.
