= Vallecito Valley =

Vallecito Valley is a valley in San Diego County, California. Vallecito, its original name, is a Spanish word meaning "little valley". The mouth of the valley is at an elevation of 1,568 feet / 478 meters, at the lower end of the ciénega southeast of the old Vallecito Stage Station, where Vallecito Creek leaves the valley. Its head is at an elevation of 3,200 feet at 32°57′05″N 116°26′31″W at the foot of the Sawtooth Range that divides it from Mason Valley.
