= Earthquake Valley =

Valley in California, United States

Coordinates: 33°05′40″N 116°27′08″W

Earthquake Valley is a desert valley east of Julian, California, which contains parts of Anza-Borrego Desert State Park. It is the location of the Shelter Valley Ranchos subdivision, which is also known as the unincorporated community of Shelter Valley. The official USGS place name for the geologic feature in which Shelter Valley is situated is "Earthquake Valley", and the 1959 USGS Topographic map makes no reference to Shelter Valley. The name of the unincorporated community Shelter Valley is typically used both locally and by the media to refer generally to the geological feature of Earthquake Valley, and it is common for both names to be referenced in publications after the 1962 establishment of the subdivision. Author, poet, artist and primitivist Marshal South lived in and wrote about the general area (including Julian, Mason Valley, Vallecito Valley, and his home in Blair Valley), in a series of articles for Desert Magazine between 1941 and 1948. A number of notable trails pass through the valley, including the Pacific Crest Trail, the California Riding and Hiking Trail, and the Southern Emigrant Trail.

== History ==
Earthquake Valley was the site of a Kumeyaay village near what is now Scissors Crossing and Sentenac Cienega, a little cienega formed at the bottom of the watershed in the valley before it descends Sentenac Canyon.

Earthquake Valley, then called the Valle de San Felipe, became the route of the Sonora Road into the coastal region of Southern California. The Sonora Road discovered by Mexican soldiers reestablished land communications between Alta California and Sonora, Mexico in the late 1820s. The valley was later the site of the Rancho Valle de San Felipe. From the time of the Mexican American War and the California Gold Rush the Sonora Road became the route of the Southern Emigrant Trail that passed through the valley from Blair Valley to Teofulio Summit, (formerly Warner Pass). This trail remained the major southern route into California from the eastern United States until the advent of the railroad at Yuma, Arizona in 1877 reduced its importance. From 1858 the important San Felipe Station of the Butterfield Overland Mail was located about a quarter mile north of Scissors Crossing. Stage lines continued to use the route until the railroad came to Yuma.
