= Tangale Peak Hill =

Nigerian Tourist Center

Pan Kilang hill is one of the tourist centers in Northeastern part of Nigeria. It is located in Kaltungo, a local government area of Gombe State. It is a beautiful volcanic hill in the south of Gombe and its conical peak is one of the highest peak in Nigeria.

Pan Kilang Hill has an elevation of 1,102 metres (3,615 feet) above sea level. It is the most elevated mountain out of the twenty three mountains in Gombe State and the first in Kaltungo Local Government. By prominence, it is the fifty first out of two thousand and seventy four in Nigeria, first out of twenty three in Gombe and the 1st in Kaltungo.
