= Brawley Formation =

Geologic formation in the Colorado Desert of southern California

- Stratigraphic range: Pleistocene
- Type: Geologic formation
- Overlies: Ocotillo Formation

Location
- Region: Colorado Desert, California
- Country: United States

Type section
- Named for: City of Brawley

The Brawley Formation is a geologic formation in the Colorado Desert of Southern California, located in northwestern Imperial County and eastern San Diego County.

== Geology ==
Sandstone and mudstone of the Brawley Formation accumulated between ~1.1 and ~0.6–0.5 Ma in a delta on the margin of an arid Pleistocene lake. It is in the San Jacinto Fault Zone area, including in the San Felipe Hills.

=== Fossils ===
It preserves fossils from the Pleistocene Epoch of the Quaternary Period, during the Cenozoic Era.

== See also ==
- Quaternary California
- Geology of Imperial County, California
- Geology of San Diego County, California
- List of fossiliferous stratigraphic units in California
- Paleontology in California
