= Jacumba Valley and Jacumba Wilderness Area =

Valley in San Diego County, California

Jacumba Wilderness
- IUCN category Ib (wilderness area)
- Location within San Diego County, California
- Coordinates: 32°39′18″N 116°11′25″W
- Area: 31,357 acres (126.90 km^{2})
- Designation: National Wilderness Preservation System
- Designated: 1994
- Operator: Bureau of Land Management
- Jacumba Valley
- Floor elevation: 2,657 ft (810 m)

Geology
- Type: Alluvial
- Country: U.S.A.
- State: California
- Borders on: Jacumba Mountains, In-Ko-Pah Mountains
- Coordinates: 32°39′18″N 116°11′25″W
- Traversed by: Mexico–United States border
- River: Carrizo Creek
- Interactive map of Jacumba Valley and Jacumba Wilderness Area

Jacumba Valley is a valley in San Diego and Imperial Counties, California. Its head is at 32°37′00″N 116°10′07″W. Carrizo Creek has its source in Jacumba Valley, 1.2 miles north of the California-Mexico State boundary, at 32°38′09″N 116°07′05″W at an elevation of 3,210 feet, on the west side of the divide between Jacumba Valley and the valley of upper Boulder Creek. Carrizo Creek flows west then north northwest through Jacumba Valley to its mouth at the head of Carrizo Gorge. Just south of the Jacumba and In-ko-pah Mountains, the terrain consists of large, flat desert plains and hills of granite boulders. The wider region, including the Jacumba Wilderness, which sits just east of the valley, has been greatly affected by the construction of the US/Mexico border and has become a site of great numbers of migrations along migrant paths.

== Indigenous peoples ==
The Jacumba Valley is the land of the Kumeyaay people, who have been divided by the border wall built through the region, what is commonly referred to as the US and Mexico. This border divides many people, including the Tohono O'odham Nation and the Yaqui people, as well. Jacumba Hot Springs, located in the valley, has played a significant role in Kumeyaay tradition, specifically within the myth of Tuchaipa and Yokomatis, two brothers who emerge from the land and traverse its terrain. The name "Jacumba" is believed to derive from the Kumeyaay term for "magic springs", as the region is home to natural mineral hot springs. As ranchers began to inhabit the region in the 19th century, tensions with the Kumeyaay rose, resulting in the Jacumba Massacre of 1870 in which many Indigenous people were killed for stealing the ranchers' cattle, or cattle rustling. There is still uncertainty as to whether cattle were stolen or not, but the feud resulted in the deaths of more than 19 Kumeyaay people and the son of a rancher. After being pushed out of their land in Jacumba Hot Springs, many Kumeyaay people migrated to Mexico, some returning around 1910 to the Campo Reservation, located just east of the valley. The Indigenous people of the borderlands became subjected to many negative stereotypes in addition to being targeted physically, and many were considered, along with the terrain of the desert, to be "uncivilized". More recently, the Jacumba Valley has become a cite of civil disobedience for organizations such as Kumeyaay Defense Against the Wall, which mobilizes people along the border to actively oppose its presence, enforcement, and continued construction as well as provide support to Kumeyaay communities on both sides.

== The drawing of a border ==
This desert is a land divided by the US-Mexico border, which is referred to as Jacumba on the US side, and Jacume on the Mexico side. When the US gained parts of Mexico's northern lands in 1848 with the Treaty of Guadalupe Hidalgo, the border as it is drawn today was established and legislation such as the Chinese Exclusion Act of 1882 increased surveillance efforts along the boundary line in order to counter unauthorized crossings. Although there has not always been a physical border, boundaries began being created and marked. Beginning in the 19th century, both US and Mexican governments began mapping projects to denote the precise division of the borderlands and aided the governments in environmental management projects amidst a difficult terrain. This mapping and marking of the land was done through the placement of obelisks. In 1911, the first section of the physical border was constructed and thirteen years later, in 1924, the US Border Patrol was formed, increasing patrolling of the borderlands. There was previously a crossing point between Jacumba and Jacume, but it was closed in 1995. Operation Gatekeeper began at this time and additional fortifications were added to what already existed of the wall, some materials used being left over steel from the Vietnam War. The Jacumba and Jacume communities, which used to be sites that residents from both sides often frequented, became barely accessible. Residents of Jacume who crossed to do grocery shopping were cut off and their lack of access resulted in the Jacumba economy losing much of the stimulation it once relied upon. Today, the drawn border covers 1,954 miles, while the physical border only takes up 776 of those miles, leaving many gaps.

== Flora and fauna ==
The Jacumba Wilderness is home to Peninsular bighorn sheep, a species that was included on the Endangered Species Act in 1998 after falling to a population of around 300 – largely due to disease, predation, and colonization. They have been able to withstand the desert environment due to their adaptability to the high temperatures, their ability to survive for months without significant water sources, and because their strongest predators, like bobcats and mountain lions, do not reside in this environment. Other species spotted in the region include jackrabbits, ocotillos, California palms, and mule deers.

== Migration across and militarization of the land ==
With the emergence of Operation Gatekeeper in the mid-1990s, the additions made onto the physical border, and the increase of border security, migrants were pushed east. As his project to make the border less permeable and since the Trump presidency in 2016, which came with even more harsh crack downs on unauthorized migration, migration though this difficult terrain has become even more dangerous. The Border Patrol has weaponized the land of the Jacumba Wilderness, militarizing it and its harsh terrain that, if traversed unprepared, can be deadly. Around the same time as Operation Gatekeeper, the "prevention through deterrence" tactic became common along the border, including in the Jacumba Wilderness and Jacumba Valley. This program began in the name of driving people into the desert and was enforced by the Border Patrol, who, through the tactic, could also avoid blame for any migrant deaths by projecting blame onto the harsh terrain. With the dangerously dramatic temperatures, predatory wildlife, and potentially harmful flora, combined with attempts to apprehend migrants, many are subjected to increasing levels of lethal danger. In addition to the militarism of the Border Patrol, the region has turned into a violent, pseudo-war zone with active militias, including the Minutemen, who seek to assist in the apprehension of migrants crossing the desert into the US without authorization. Many migrant people are rescued by Border Patrol, Search, Trauma and Rescue (BORSTAR) once they are found, for then provide food, water and first aid, finally get them to the nearest hospital if need and process them in the Border Patrol Station to register and return them to their countries.
