= Carrizo Badlands =

Coordinates: 32°51′06″N 116°08′15″W

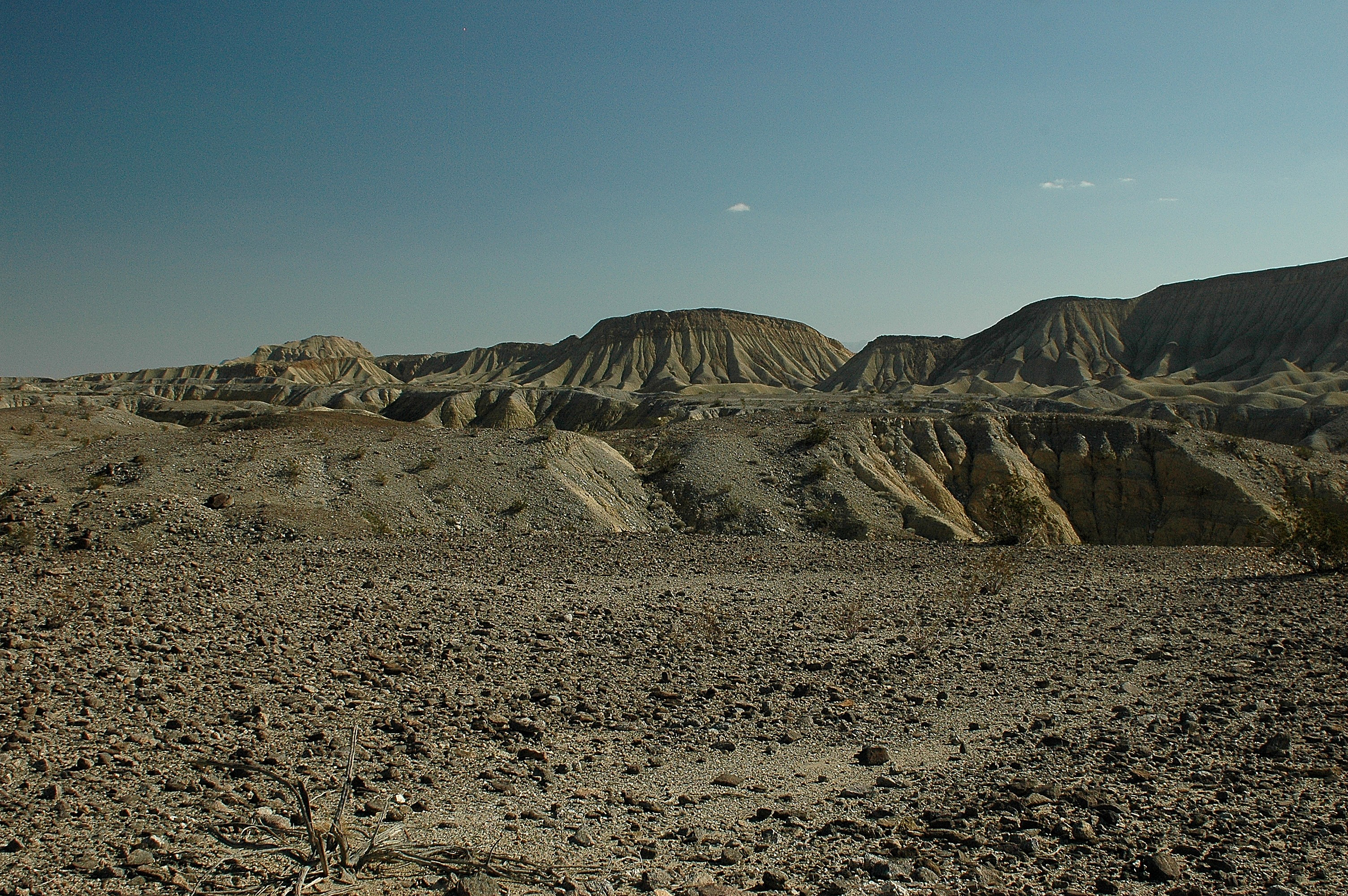
View southwest across the Carrizo Badlands from the Wind Caves, in Anza-Borrego Desert State Park.

The Carrizo Badlands are a landform of badlands that lie within Anza-Borrego Desert State Park in eastern San Diego County, and in the Carrizo Impact Area in western Imperial County, in Southern California.

== Geography ==
The badlands lie south of the Vallecito Mountains and Fish Creek Mountains, and north of the Tierra Blanca Mountains and Coyote Mountains.

The Carrizo Badlands are bisected by the Carrizo Valley, created by the erosion of the badlands by Carrizo Creek, and ending in the Carrizo Wash, 3 miles east of the site of the old Carrizo Creek Station. Vallecito Creek is a major tributary of Carrizo Creek.

Features

One of the features within the Carrizo Badlands are the Mud Caves in Arroyo Tapiado.
