= Mason Valley =

Mason Valley may mean:

- Mason Valley (California), a valley in San Diego County, California
- Mason Valley (Nevada), a valley in western Nevada
- Mason's Valley, Arizona, an earlier name for Top-of-the-World, Arizona
