= Aedes papago =

Scientific classification
- Kingdom: Animalia
- Phylum: Arthropoda
- Class: Insecta
- Order: Diptera
- Family: Culicidae
- Genus: Aedes
- Subgenus: Abraedes; Zavortink, 1970
- Species: A. papago

Binomial name
- Aedes papago Zavortink, 1970

Species of mosquito

Aedes papago is a species of mosquito in the genus Aedes. It is found in tree-holes and rock-holes.

== Taxonomy ==
Aedes (Abraedes) is a subgenus of Aedes that contains only Aedes papago.

== Description ==
Female A. papago mosquitoes have a wingspan of around 3.15 mm, a proboscis of up to 2.06 mm and an abdomen of 3.2 mm. The integument on their head gradients from dark brown to black in colour. It lacks frontal bristles.

In males, the white speckling of the proboscis is reduced, or absent all together.

== Larvae ==
Larvae have an average head size of 0.97 mm and a siphon of 0.72 mm. They have a white abdomen.

== Distribution ==
Aedes papago has been found only from the Mendoza Canyon, in the Coyote Mountains in Arizona. It is likely to occur in northwestern Mexico and southeastern Arizona.
