= Cuyapaipe Mountain =

Californian mountain

- Location within California Location within the United States

Highest point
- Elevation: 6,381 ft (1,945 m) NAVD 88
- Prominence: 1,578 ft (481 m)
- Coordinates: 32°50′21″N 116°24′02″W

Geography
- Location: San Diego, County, California, U.S.
- Parent range: Laguna Mountains
- Topo map: USGS Mount Laguna

Cuyapaipe Mountain or Cuyapaipe Peak (/ˈkwiːəpaɪpiː/) is the tallest summit in the Laguna Mountains of San Diego County, California at an elevation of 6,381 feet (1,945 m). It is located within the Ewiiaapaayp Indian Reservation of the Ewiiaapaayp Band of Kumeyaay Indians (formerly Cuyapaipe Band of Mission Indians).
