= Sawtooth Mountains Wilderness =

Protected wilderness area in California, United States

- IUCN category Ib (wilderness area)
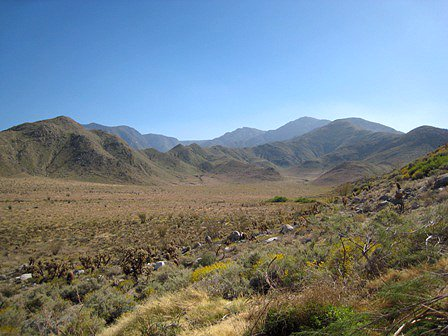

- Location within San Diego County, California Location within California Location within the United States
- Interactive map of Sawtooth Mountains Wilderness
- Location: Sawtooth Mountains, San Diego County, California
- Nearest city: Borrego Springs, California
- Coordinates: 32°54′10″N 116°21′14″W
- Area: 32,136 acres (130.0 km^{2})
- Established: 1994
- Governing body: Bureau of Land Management / DOI

Sawtooth Mountains Wilderness is a federal wilderness area of 32,136 acres (130.0 km^{2}) in the Sawtooth Mountains in eastern San Diego County, California. It is located in the Colorado Desert, 35 miles (56 km) south of Borrego Springs, near Anza-Borrego Desert State Park.

This land was added to the National Wilderness Preservation System when the US Congress passed the California Desert Protection Act of 1994 (Public Law 103-433). The Bureau of Land Management is the agency in charge of Sawtooth Mountains Wilderness.

== Description ==
Wilderness topography includes ridges, valleys, and canyons that support a wide array of plant and animal life. Wildlife include raptors, such as the golden eagle and prairie falcon. The spotted bat, San Diego horned lizard, and the willow flycatcher are also found here.

Vegetation consists of Sonoran Desert plants, including ocotillo, cholla cactus, and creosote bush.

Although State Route 2 winds along the northern side of the wilderness, there is no legal access due to private lands along the boundary. The only public access is from the Pepperwood Height Trail, at the end of the McCain Valley.

== See also ==
- Flora of the Sonoran Deserts
- Fauna of the Sonoran Deserts
