= Rodriguez Canyon (California) =

Mountain canyon in San Diego County, California

Rodriguez Canyon is a steep mountain canyon in San Diego County, California. It has its head at 33°02′55″N 116°31′43″W at an elevation of 4,120 feet in the Cuyamaca Mountains. Its mouth is at 2,549 feet (777 meters) at its confluence with Oriflamme Canyon, where they form the head of Vallecito Wash at the northwestern end of Mason Valley.
