= Oriflamme Canyon =

Canyon in the Laguna mountains of San Diego County, California

Oriflamme Canyon is a steep mountain canyon in San Diego County, California, that descends from its head in the Laguna Mountains at 32°56′41″N 116°29′45″W, in an arc northwestward then northeastward to join Rodriguez Canyon at the northwest end of Mason Valley, where Vallecito Wash has its source.

== History ==
This canyon was along the route of Native Americans across the mountains and desert between the Native American peoples of what is now mountain and coastal San Diego County, California, and those on the Colorado River. It was later used by Spanish, Mexican, and American travelers, including U. S. Army couriers and the San Antonio-San Diego Mail Line. The latter's passengers rode up and down the canyon on mules between Carrizo Creek Station and Lassitor's Ranch in Green Valley on the short route to San Diego in which the passengers rode over the mountains on mule or horseback.
