= Alma Wash =

Arroyo in California, USA

Coordinates: 33.1°N 116.1°W

Alma Wash is an arroyo located in the U.S. state of California. It is located in San Diego County. It is part of the watershed of the San Felipe Creek.
