= Mud Caves =

Cave feature in California, US

Coordinates: 32°55′29″N 116°11′19″W

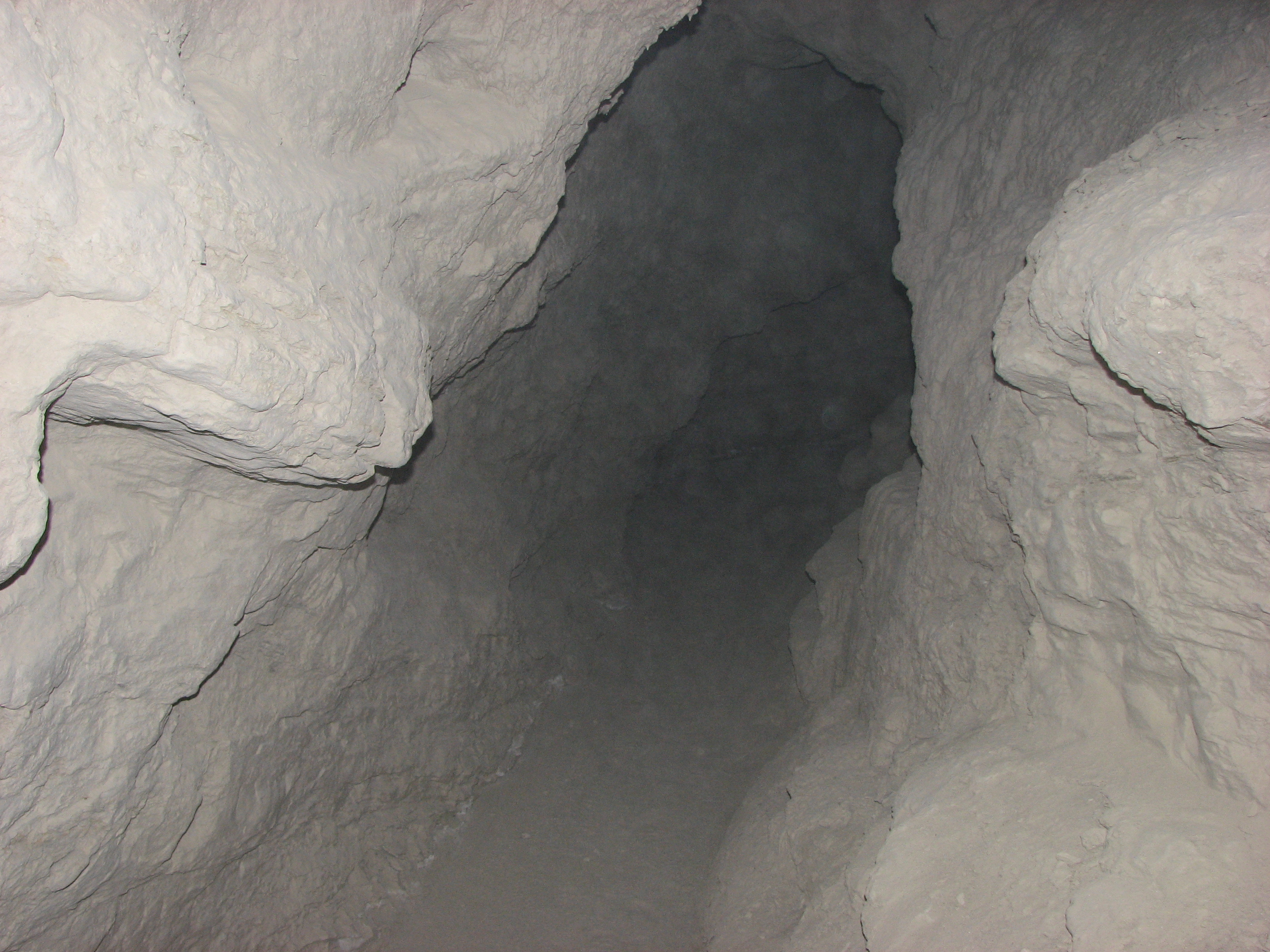
- Inside one of the mud caves
- Interactive map of Mud Caves
- Location: San Diego County, California
- Access: Public

The Mud Caves are a popular feature in Anza Borrego Desert State Park in San Diego County, California. The caves, located in the Carrizo Badlands, along the Arroyo Tapiado, were created by water flowing through a thick deposit of silt and are an example of pseudokarst topography. There are at least 22 caves, some up to 1,000 feet (300 m) in length and 80 feet (24 m) in height. Many of the caves are easily accessed.

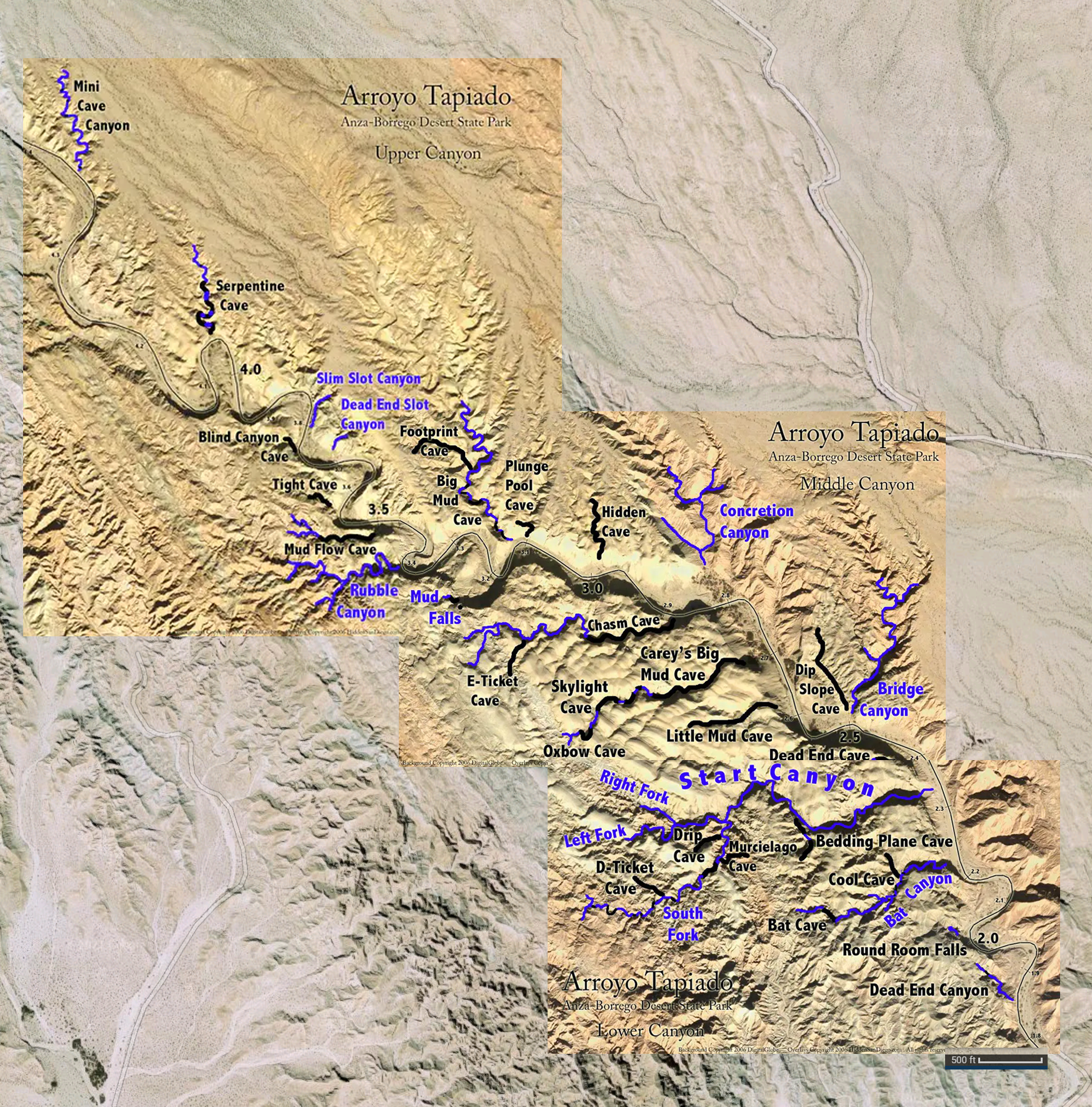
Anza Borrego Mud Caves Map

Some of the caves found here include:

- Big Mud Cave - The only cave marked on most maps.
- Hidden Cave - Impossible to find without precise directions.
- Chasm Cave - A popular cave with a skylight.
- Carey's Big Mud Cave - The largest cave in the arroyo.
- Plunge Pool Cave - A short cave that ends in a round room that towers above you.
- Dip Slope Cave - The small entrance is easy to miss.
