= Imperial Formation =

- Stratigraphic range: 1.) Canada: Devonian of Paleozoic Era. 2.) California: Pliocene of Cenozoic Era.
- Type: Two separate geologic formations
- Underlies: Palm Spring Formation (California)
- Overlies: Ocotillo Formation (California)

Location
- Region: 1.) Northwest Territories, Canada; 2.) Colorado Desert, Imperial County, California, United States

The Imperial Formation is the name of two distinct and unrelated geologic formations in North America, of different geologic Eras.

== Separate formations ==
=== Canadian Paleozoic Era formation ===
The older Imperial Formation occurs in the Northwest Territories of Canada. It preserves fossils dating back to the Devonian period of the Paleozoic Era.

=== Californian Cenozoic Era formation ===
The younger Imperial Formation occurs in the Colorado Desert, in Imperial County of Southern California. It dates to the Zanclean−Lower Pliocene stage of the Pliocene Epoch, during the Neogene Period of the Cenozoic Era.

It underlies the Palm Spring Formation, and overlies the Ocotillo Formation.

== See also ==
- List of fossiliferous stratigraphic units in California
- List of fossiliferous stratigraphic units in Northwest Territories
- Pliocene California
