= Vallecito Mountains =

Mountain range in California, United States

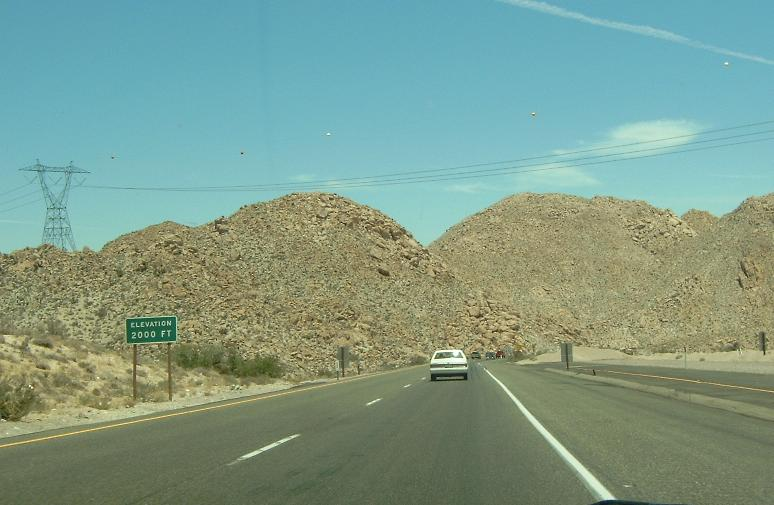
- Vallecito Mountains

Highest point
- Peak: Whale Peak
- Elevation: 1,630 m (5,350 ft)
- Coordinates: 33°1.78′N 116°18.98′W

Geography
- Location within California
- Country: United States
- State: California
- Region: Colorado Desert
- District(s): Anza-Borrego Desert State Park, San Diego County
- Range coordinates: 33°1′45.170″N 116°18′58.044″W
- Topo map: USGS Whale Peak

The Vallecito Mountains are a mountain range in the Colorado Desert in eastern San Diego County, California. They are about 28 miles (45 km) north of the Mexico–United States border.

== Geography ==
The mountains lie in Anza-Borrego Desert State Park, in an east–west direction, southwest of the community of Ocotillo Wells, and south of Highway 78. The range is approximately 15 miles (24 km) long, and reaches an elevation of 5,349 feet (1,630 m) above sea level at Whale Peak.

The Laguna Mountains are to the southwest and the Volcan Mountains to the northwest, and the Pinyon Mountains and Borrego Valley are on the north side. The Sawtooth Mountains, Tierra Blanca Mountains and Jacumba Mountains ranges lie to the south and southeast.
