= Palm Spring, San Diego County, California =

Historical Landmark in Anza-Borrego Desert State Park, United States

Palm Spring
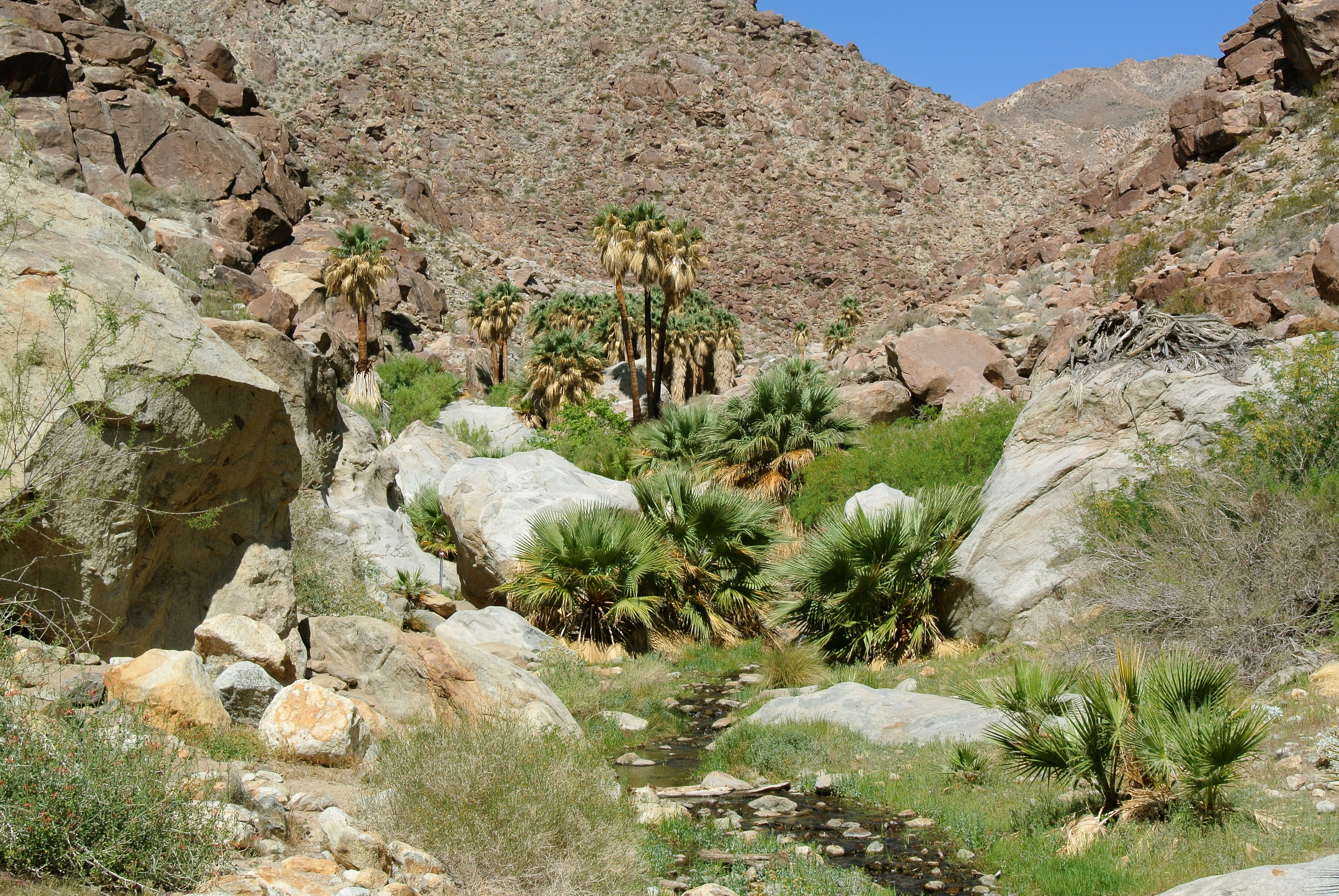
- Palm Spring

- Location within California Location within the United States
- 32.919°N 116.218°W
- Location: Borrego Springs, California; Anza-Borrego Desert State Park

History
- Built: December 20–22, 1775.

California Historical Landmark
- Reference no.: 639

Palm Spring is a spring in Mesquite Oasis, a desert oasis amidst a mesquite thicket and a few palms, close to Carrizo Creek, within Anza-Borrego Desert State Park in San Diego County, California.

Palm Spring, first used by the local Native Americans and those traveling to and from the Colorado River, was subsequently used by Spanish and later Mexican traders and American fur trappers and soldiers. It was a popular camping spot on the Southern Emigrant Trail during the California Gold Rush. It became a water stop for the San Antonio-San Diego Mail Line in 1857 and Palm Spring Station became a relay stage station for Butterfield Overland Mail from 1858 to 1861. It remained a watering place for later travelers to Arizona and for the stage lines that ran to Yuma, Arizona, from 1867 to 1877.

The site is a California Historical Landmark. A historical marker was placed here by California State Park Commission working with the Fremont-Kearny Historicans of Old San Diego in 1958.

== See also ==
- California Historical Landmarks in San Diego County
- Vallecito Stage Station County Park
