= San Matias Pass =

Mountain pass in Baja California, Mexico

Coordinates: 31°18′47″N 115°29′18″W

San Matias Pass, or Paseo San Matias, is a pass at the crest of the east west divide between the Pacific Ocean and Gulf of California watersheds of the Baja California Peninsula located in Baja California. The pass lies between the Peninsular Ranges of Sierra de Juarez to the north and the Sierra San Pedro Martir to the south.

The eastern end of the long oval basin, called the Valle la Trinidad, forms the upper part of the San Matias Pass, at about 3200 feet. It descends eastward down Cañon San Matias to 2160 feet where it empties out into the Valle Santa Clara to the east. The pass and canyon separates the south end of the Sierra Juarez from the north end of the San Pedro Martir Mountains. The pass is a gap about a quarter of a mile wide with a nearly flat bottom and a gradual descent.

The modern Mexican Federal Highway 3, between Ensenada and its junction on Mexican Federal Highway 5 on the east coast plain of the peninsula, passes through this pass.
