= Fish Creek Mountains (California) =

Mountain range in California, USA

- Location within California

Highest point
- Elevation: 712 m (2,336 ft)

Geography
- Country: United States
- State: California
- District: Imperial County
- Range coordinates: 32°58′40.195″N 116°0′7.032″W
- Topo map: USGS Carrizo Mountain NE

The Fish Creek Mountains are a mountain range in Imperial County, California.
