= Jacumba Mountains =

Highest point
- Peak: Jacumba Peak
- Elevation: 1,375 m (4,511 ft)
- Coordinates: 32°41.87′N 116°09.87′W

Geography
- Location within San Diego County, California Location within southern California Location within California
- Country: United States
- State: California
- District: San Diego County
- Range coordinates: 32°43′11.212″N 116°10′21.060″W
- Parent range: Peninsular Ranges
- Topo map: USGS Jacumba

The Jacumba Mountains are a mountain range of the Peninsular Ranges in eastern San Diego County, California, near the Mexico–United States border. The range reaches an elevation of 4,512 feet (1,375 m) at Jacumba Peak, near the southern end of the chain.

The range lies in a northwest-southeasterly direction, east of the In-Ko-Pah Mountains, and north of Interstate 8. The range is approximately 11.5 miles (18.5 km) long, and Table Mountain at the southeast end of the range is located about 3 miles (4.8 km) northeast of the town of Jacumba.

The Tierra Blanca Mountains and the Sawtooth Mountains are to the northwest, and Anza-Borrego Desert State Park due north. The Coyote Mountains lie to the northeast. The Volcanic Hills area lies on the northeast flank of the range.
