= Laguna Mountains =

Mountain range in San Diego County, California

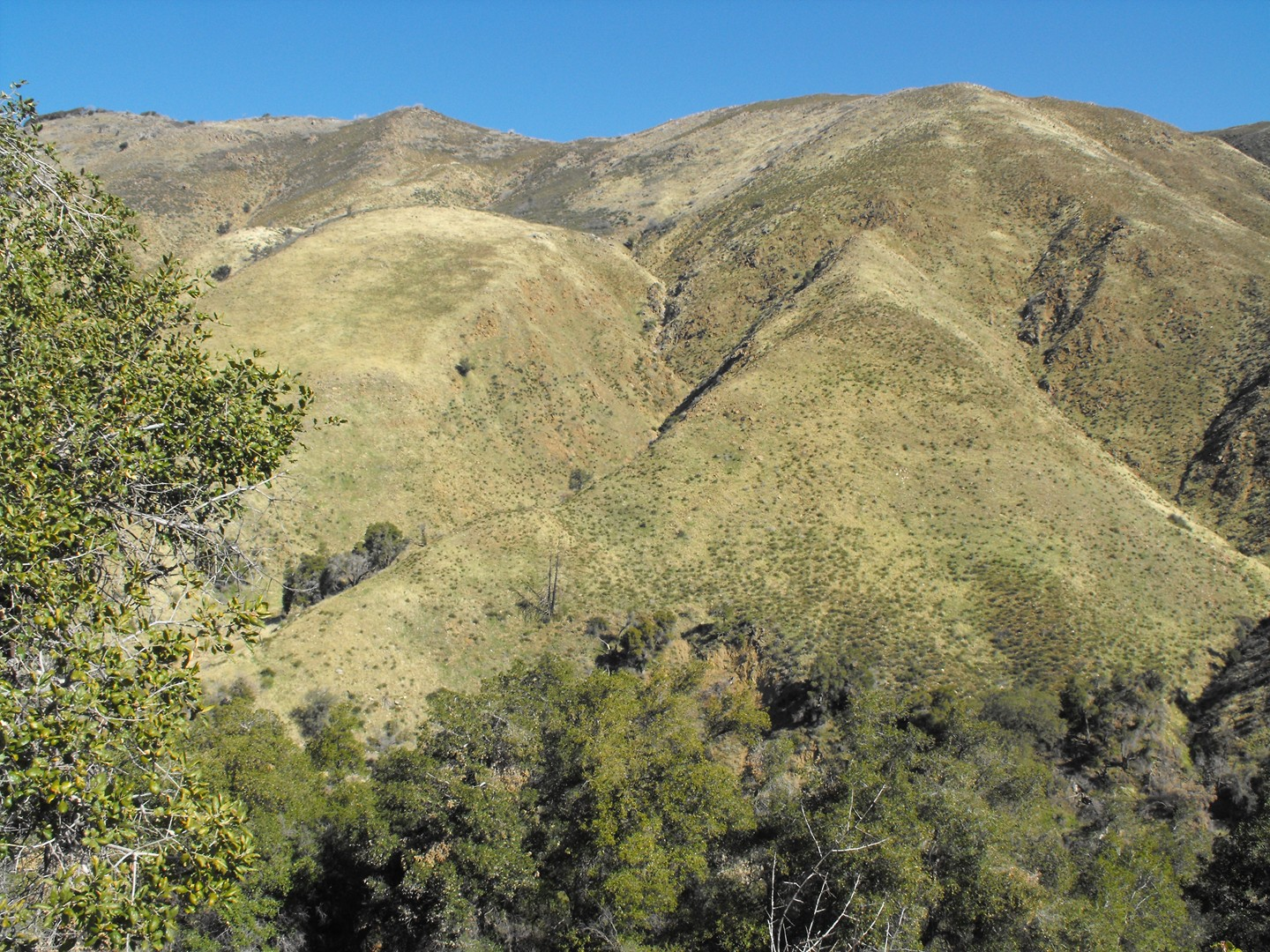
- Chaparral, riparian, and grassland habitats.

Highest point
- Peak: Cuyapaipe Mountain
- Elevation: 1,945 m (6,381 ft)
- Coordinates: 32°50′21″N 116°24′01″W

Geography
- Location within California
- Country: United States
- State: California
- District: San Diego County
- Range coordinates: 32°48′30.187″N 116°26′57.061″W
- Parent range: Peninsular Ranges
- Topo map: USGS Mount Laguna

The Laguna Mountains are a mountain range of the Peninsular Ranges in eastern San Diego County, California. The mountains run in a northwest/southeast alignment for approximately 35 miles (56 km).

The mountains have long been inhabited by the indigenous Kumeyaay people.

== Geography ==
The Laguna Mountains are bordered by the Cuyamaca Mountains area on the west and the Colorado Desert on the east, where the mountains form a steep escarpment along the Laguna Salada Fault. To the north the Laguna Mountains are bounded by the Elsinore Fault Zone and to the south by Cameron Valley and Thing Valley.

The highest point is Cuyapaipe Mountain at 6,378 feet (1,944 m). The mountains are largely contained within Cleveland National Forest. Snow falls on the highest peaks several times a year. Mount Laguna is a village in the Laguna Mountains with a population of about 80.

The headwaters of three perennial streams begin in the Laguna Mountains: Noble Creek, Cottonwood Creek, and Kitchen Creek.

The Laguna Mountains extend northwest about 35 mi (56 km) from the Mexican border at the Sierra de Juárez range. The Sawtooth Range and In-Ko-Pah Mountains are adjacent to the east. The Santa Rosa Mountains lie further to the northeast. The Cuyamaca Mountains are adjacent along the west.

The southern section is in the Mountain Empire region of San Diego County, and the northern section is in the East County region.

== Recreation ==
The Laguna Mountains are a popular recreation area in Cleveland National Forest. They comprise the southernmost crest along the Pacific Crest Trail.

Their relatively high altitude induces the highest snowfall in San Diego County making it one of the few local places to offer snow activities like sledding and snowshoeing.

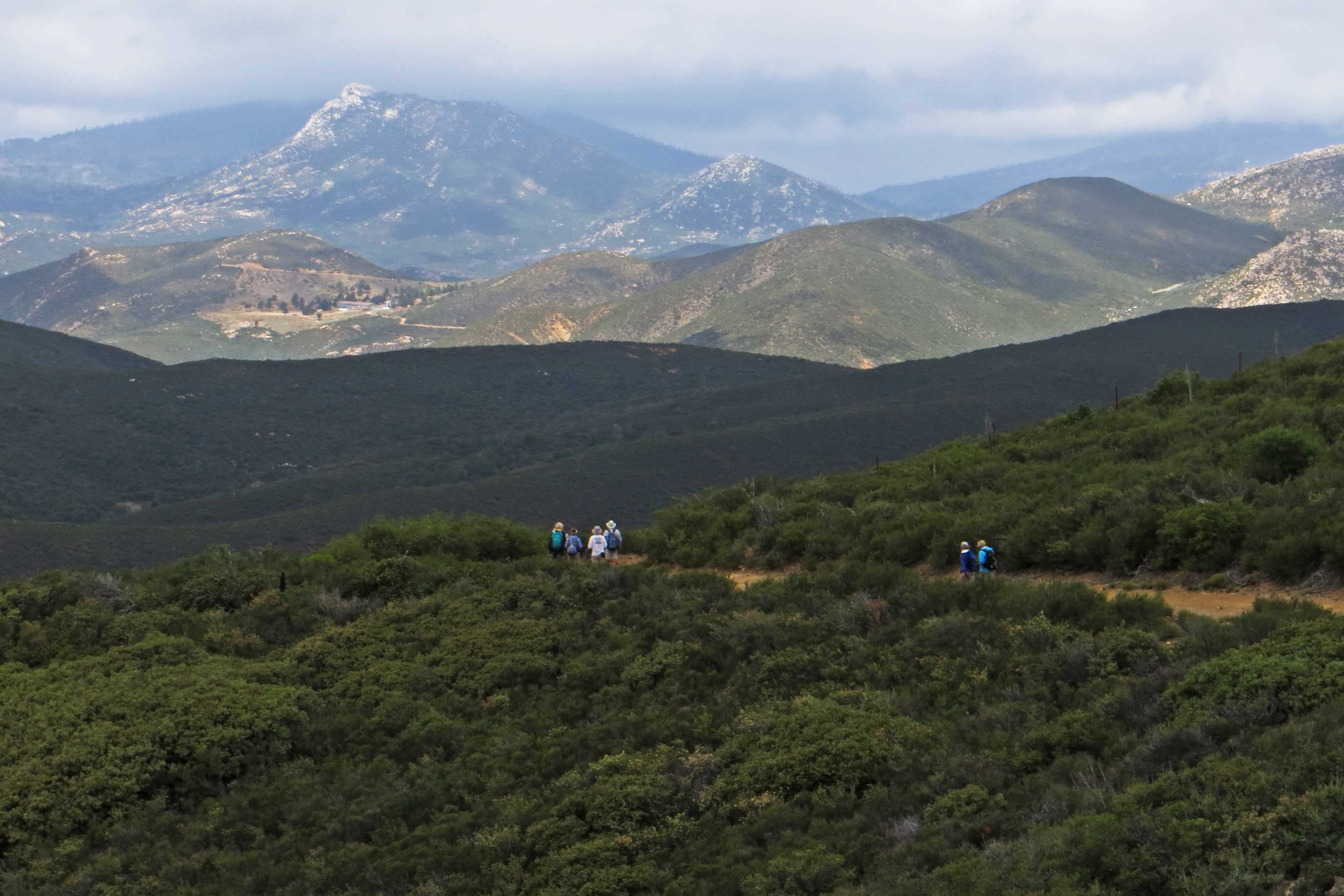
Laguna Mountain's chaparral habitat in foreground, Cuyamaca Mountains in background.

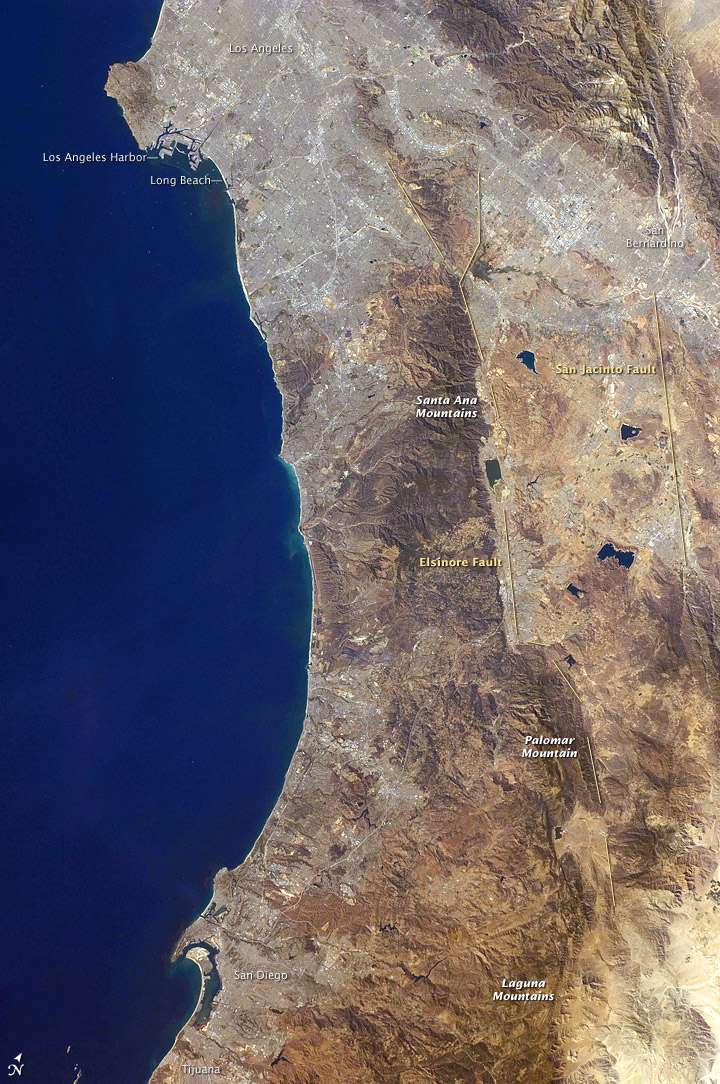
Laguna Mountains (lower right/east), and other Peninsular Ranges in Southern California.

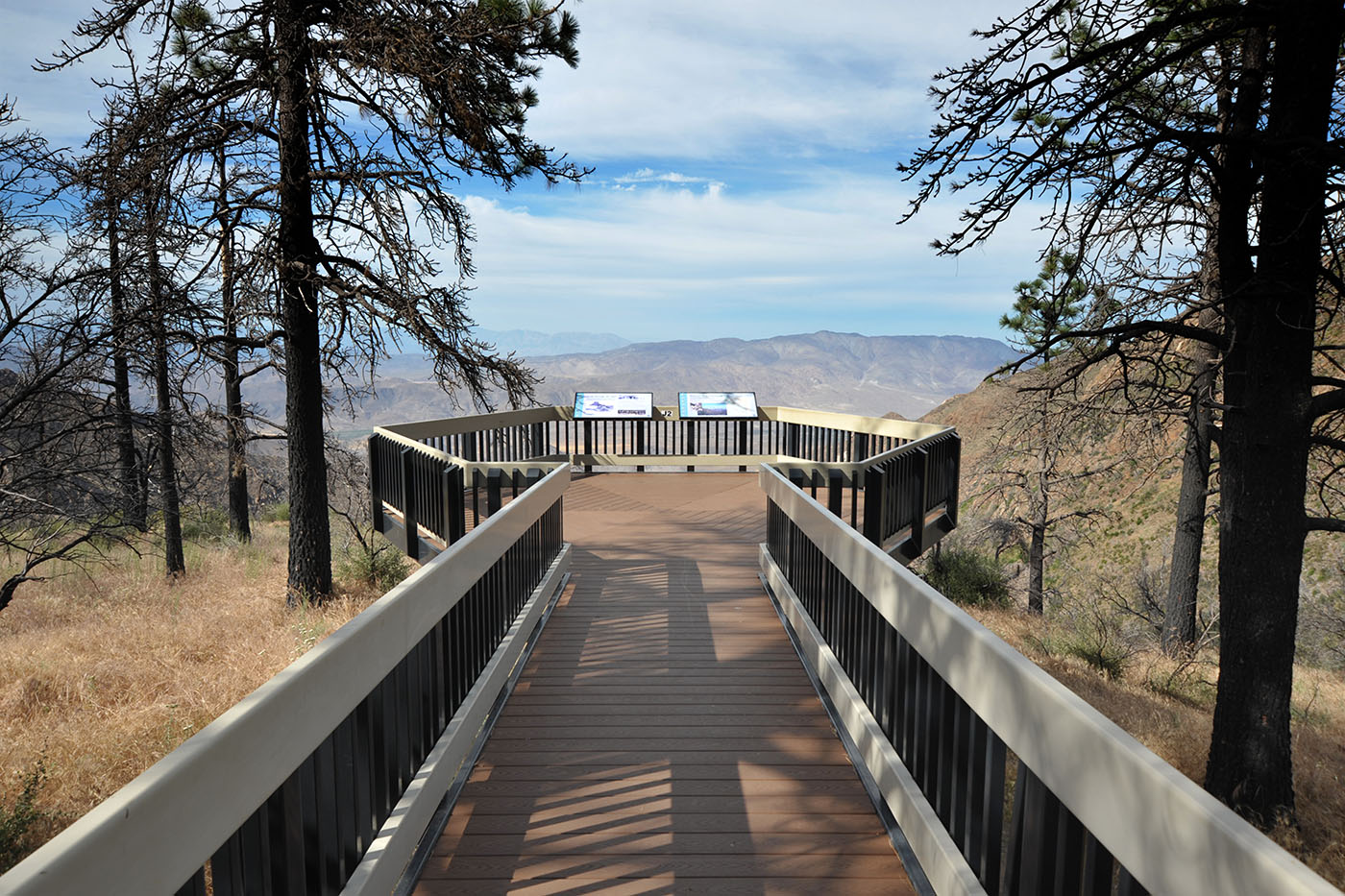
Cleveland National Forest observation deck in the Laguna Mountains.

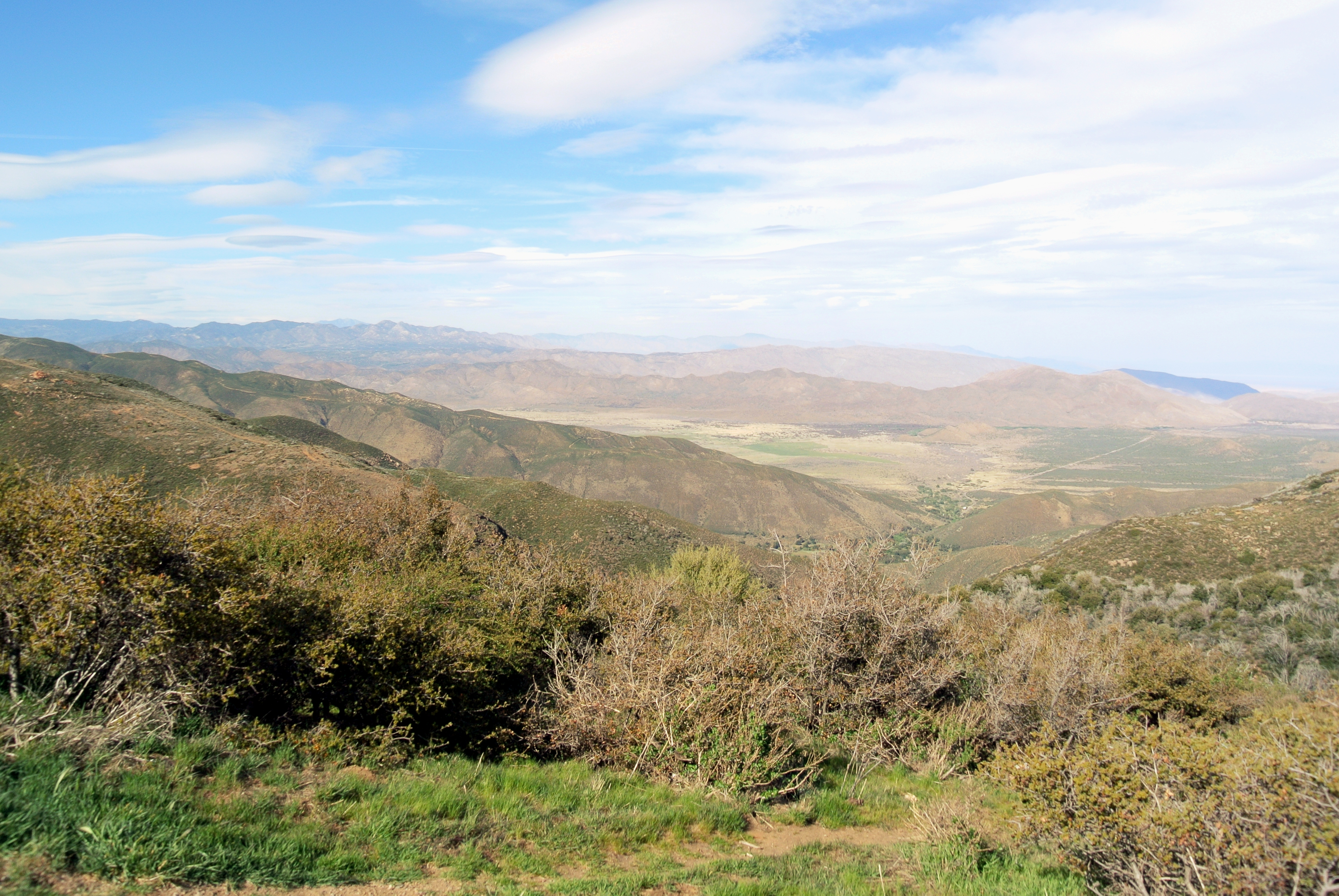
Inspiration Point view, east towards Anza Borrego Desert State Park (right), Vallecito Mountains (left), and Santa Rosa Mountains (left background).

== See also ==
- Mountain ranges of San Diego County, California
- Natural history of the Peninsular Ranges
