= Ocotillo Formation =

Geologic formation in the Colorado Desert of Southern California, United States

- Stratigraphic range: Pliocene
- Type: Geologic formation
- Underlies: Palm Spring Formation
- Overlies: Brawley Formation

Location
- Region: Colorado Desert, California
- Country: United States

Type section
- Named for: Ocotillo, California

The Ocotillo Formation is a Pliocene fluvial-alluvial fan geologic formation in the Colorado Desert of Southern California.

It occurs in western Imperial County and eastern San Diego County.

== Geology ==
The formation overlies the Brawley Formation and the Palm Spring Formation. In the Mecca Hills, it is younger than 765,000 years.

=== Fossils ===
It preserves fossils and petrified wood, from the Pliocene Epoch of the Neogene Period, within Anza-Borrego Desert State Park.

== See also ==
- Pliocene California
- List of fossiliferous stratigraphic units in California
- Paleontology in California
