= Palm Spring Formation =

Geologic formation in California, United States

- Stratigraphic range: Lower Pleistocene
- Type: Geologic formation
- Underlies: Vallecito Badlands
- Overlies: Imperial Formation, Ocotillo Formation

Location
- Region: Colorado Desert, California
- Country: United States

The Palm Spring Formation is a Pleistocene Epoch geologic formation in the eastern Colorado Desert of Imperial County and San Diego County County, Southern California.

== Geology ==
The Palm Spring Formation is an extensively-exposed delta-plain deposit debouched by the ancestral Colorado River across the subsiding Salton Trough. It records the development of the prehistoric Colorado River delta cone into a barrier excluding marine waters from the Salton Trough.

=== Fossils ===
It preserves fossils from the Pleistocene Epoch, during the Quaternary Period of the Cenozoic Era.

Lower Pliocene sub−period petrified wood is found in Anza-Borrego Desert State Park. The Lauraceae is represented by petrified Umbellularia, the Salicaceae with petrified Populus and Salix, and the Juglandaceae with petrified Juglans.

== See also ==
- Ocotillo Formation — fluvial-alluvial fan Pliocene formation
- Quaternary California
- List of fossiliferous stratigraphic units in California
- Paleontology in California
