= Volcanic Hills (Nevada) =

Mountain range in Esmeralda Country, Nevada, US

- Location within Nevada

Highest point
- Elevation: 1,963 m (6,440 ft)

Geography
- Country: United States
- State: Nevada
- District: Esmeralda County
- Range coordinates: 37°58′39.750″N 118°7′9.402″W
- Topo map: USGS Volcanic Hills East

The Volcanic Hills are a mountain range in Esmeralda County, Nevada.
