= Mason Valley (California) =

Mason Valley is a valley in San Diego County, California. Mason Valley was named after settler James E. Mason, who established a ranch in the valley in the later 19th century. The mouth of the valley is at an elevation of 1,995 feet / 608 meters, at the point where the valley narrows into a canyon where the Vallecito Wash continues as Vallecito Creek and passes between the Sawtooth Range and the Vallecito Mountains. The head of Mason Valley is at an elevation of 2550 feet at 33°01′05″N 116°28′53″W at the junction of Oriflamme Canyon and Rodriguez Canyon where Vallecito Wash has its source.
