= Marshal South =

North American desert author

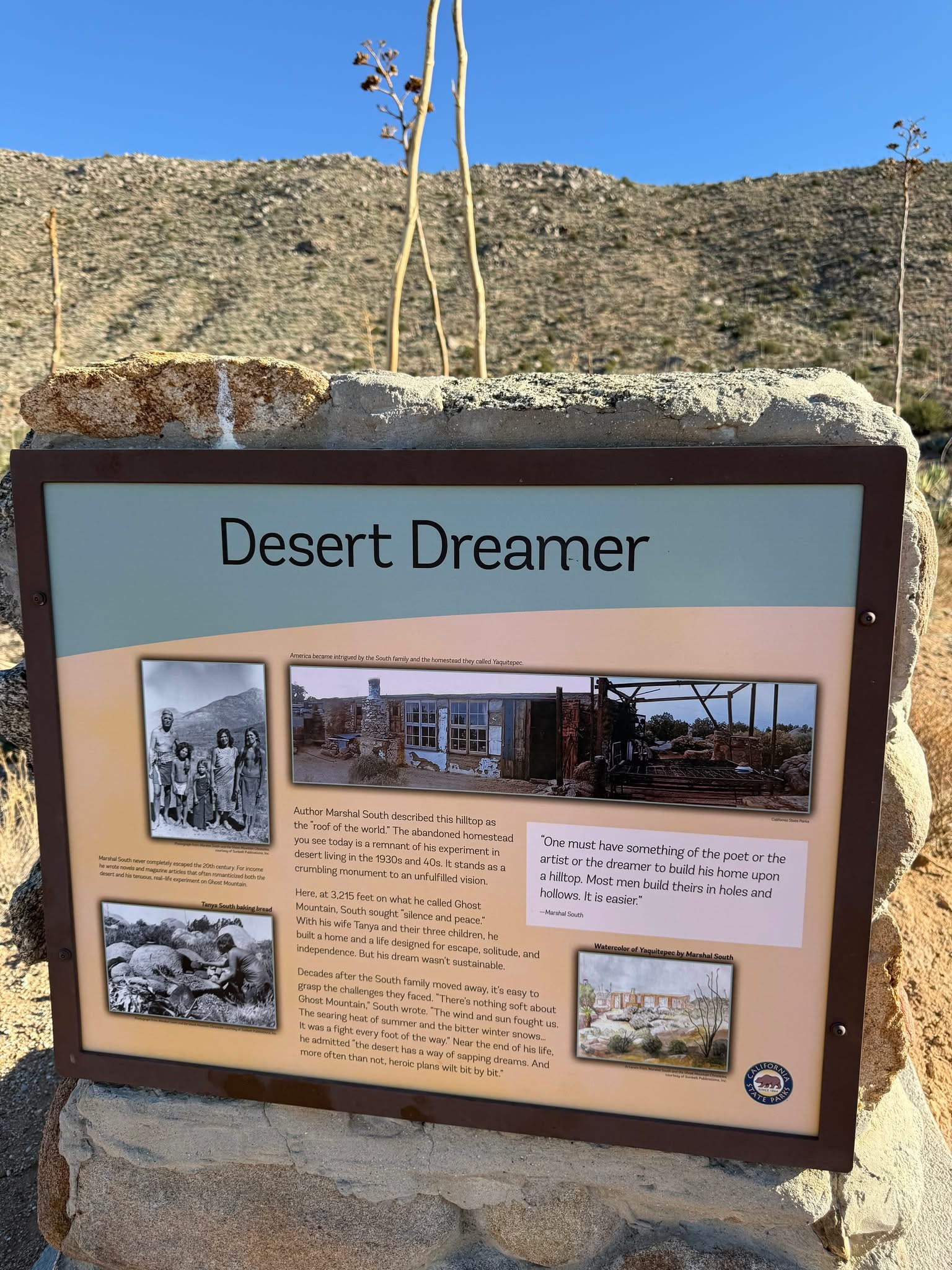
Trailhead sign

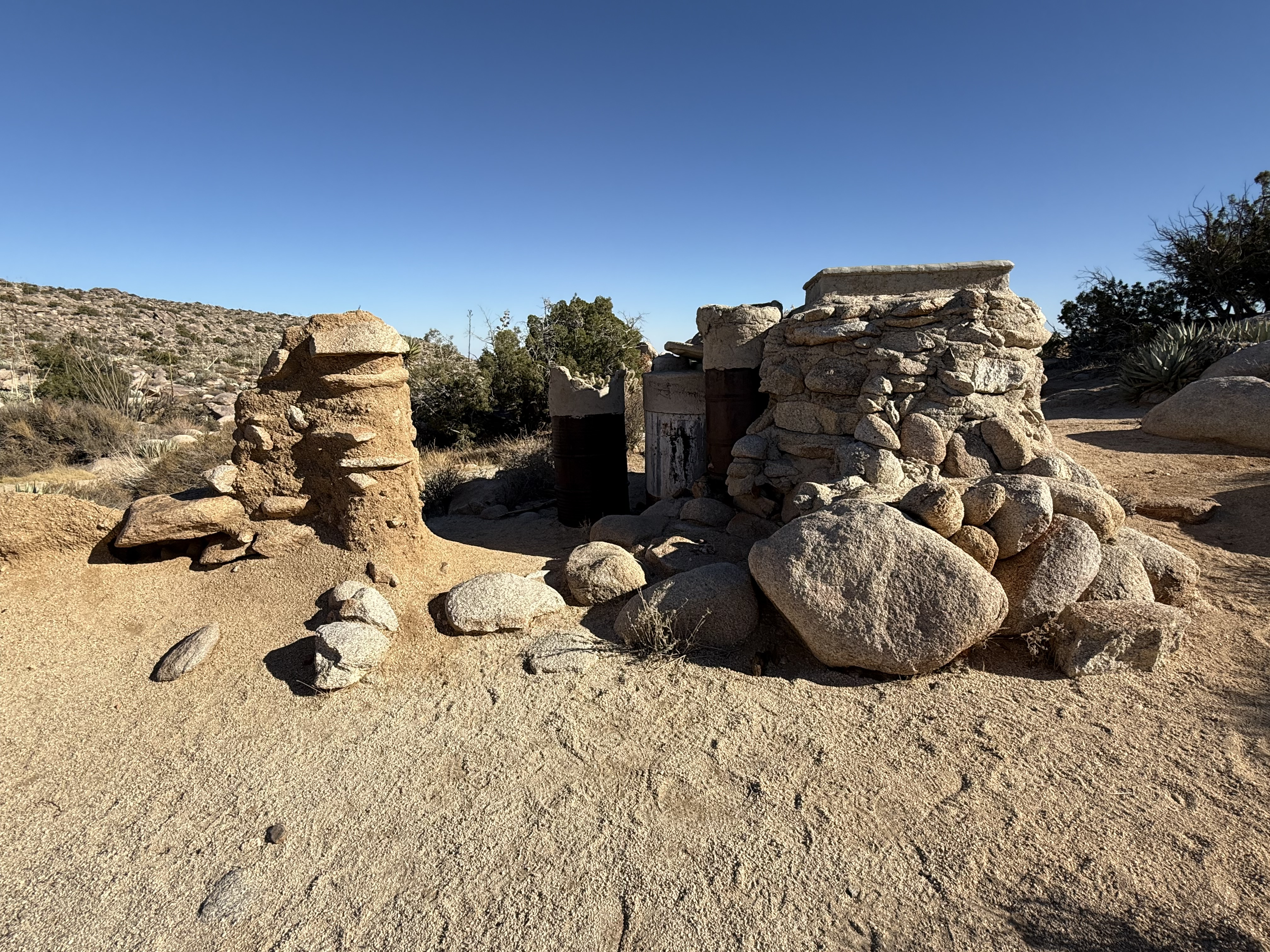
The ruins of Yaquitepec

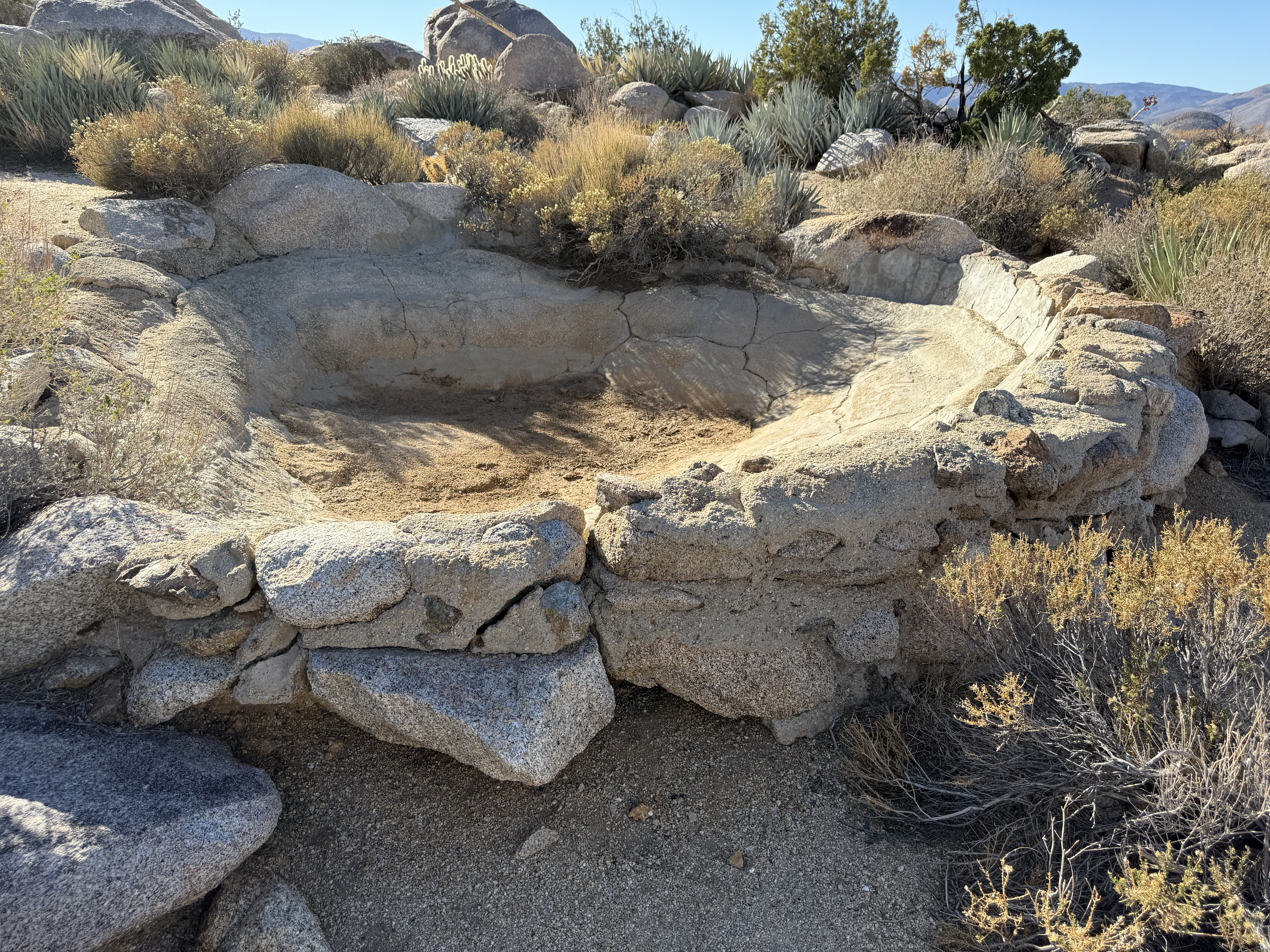
Water cistern

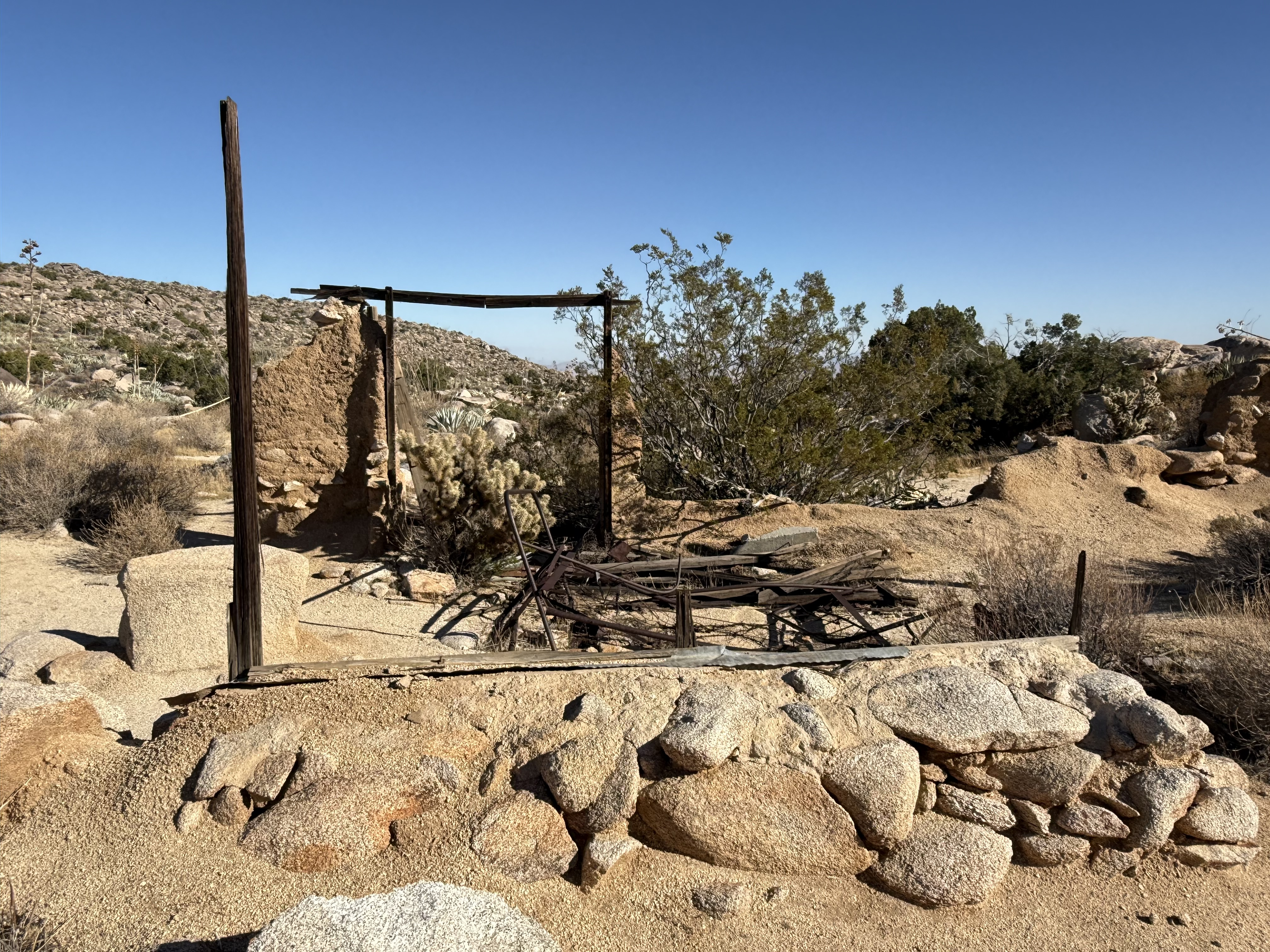
The nominal Ghost Mountain in background

Roy Bennet Richards (24 February 1889 – 22 October 1948), better known by the pen name Marshal South, was an Australian author and poet, best known for his experiment in primitive living in the Anza-Borrego Desert of Southern California.

For 17 years, South lived with his family in a remote desert location, which he called Ghost Mountain, miles from any town or reliable water source. He wrote numerous articles about primitive living for Desert Magazine, and an article for Saturday Evening Post about his experiences. He also authored novels set in the American West, and wrote and published poetry.

South is the subject of a book by Peter Wild and a 2005 documentary by John McDonald that is screened daily at the Anza-Borrego Desert State Park. A hiking trail at the state park is also named for him.

== Early life ==
Roy Bennet Richards was born in South Australia on February 24, 1889. Richards took on the pen name of Marshal South after he moved to the United States and began publishing his works. He divorced his first wife, Margaret, shortly before the birth of their son.

== Life on Ghost Mountain ==
Marshal lived with his wife Tanya on Ghost Mountain in the Anza-Borrego Desert State Park in Southern California from 1930 to 1947. The hot desert climate (BWh) had extreme temperatures in the summer and sparse water sources, and no trees for firewood. They built an adobe home, and used water cisterns to store rainwater.

The family harvested nearby chia seeds, cactus fruit, and agave plants. They had honey from beehives they kept at the base of Ghost Mountain. Their dishes and pots were made from local clay on Ghost Mountain, fired in a kiln near their home. They used yucca fibers to make webbing for chairs, sandals, and rope. Everything else they needed, they purchased in town from income Marshal received from writing short stories, poetry, and novels. Marshal had a manual typewriter and would travel to Julian, California, the nearest town, to mail his writings to be published.

They called their home on Ghost Mountain, "Yaquitepec," named after the Yaqui tribe of Sonora, Mexico, and “tepec” meaning “hill” in Aztec. Yaquitepec was built over several years. The indigenous people questioned why he would build a house there.

Marshal and his wife Tanya had three children during the time they lived at Yaquitepec, Rider Del Sol South, Rudyard Del Sol South and Victoria Del Sol South. Tanya temporarily moved to the city of Oceanside, California to give birth to each of her children.

After leaving Ghost Mountain, Marshal and Tanya South divorced, in 1947; she charged him with "extreme cruelty".

== Works ==
Marshal South published monthly articles for Desert Magazine from 1939 to 1948 and his column, entitled Desert Diary, chronicled his life with his family on Ghost Mountain. South also received a one-year contract to write 12 articles after Desert Refuge appeared in the Saturday Evening Post in March, 1939. In that article, he described his family's then successful experiment in primitive living. He also wrote a series of articles called Desert Trails. Tanya also published poems in Desert Magazine. During their time on Ghost Mountain, Marshal wrote eight novels, many of which were set in the American West. His novels have been compared to those of Zane Grey.

A compilation of South's writings in Desert Magazine can be found in Marshal South and the Ghost Mountain Chronicles: An Experiment in Primitive Living by Lilian South, published in 2005. Peter Wild wrote a book about the South's experience on Ghost Mountain in a book called Marshal South of Yaquitepec, which was published in 2005.

The South family had an extensive correspondence with the readers of Marshal's writings. They had about 50 guests per year visiting Yaquitepec and many readers sent Christmas presents to the family each year.

== Death and legacy ==
South died of heart failure on October 22, 1948, aged 59. He was initially buried in an unmarked grave in Julian Pioneer Cemetery in Julian, California. The exact location of which was unknown for many years due to the cemetery records being lost in a fire. However, after further research, his grave was found and a headstone added in January 2005.

A 1.3 miles (2.1 km) hiking trail in Anza-Borrego State Park was named after him and leads to the ruins of Yaquitepec in Blair Valley. There is also a stone plaque dedicated to South located at the trailhead, installed by California State Parks.
