= Vallecito Wash =

Vallecito Wash is a wash part of Vallecito Creek, a tributary stream of Carrizo Creek in San Diego County, California.

Vallecito Wash has its source on the east side of the Cuyamaca Mountains, at an elevation of 2,549 feet / 777 meters, at the junction of Oriflamme Canyon and Rodriguez Canyon at 33°01′05″N 116°28′53″W. It then trends southeast about four miles through Mason Valley to its southeast end at an elevation of 1,955 feet / 596 meters, where it continues as Vallecito Creek. The Vallecito Wash trail is suitable for scenic driving year round.
