= Volcan Mountains =

Mountain range in California, United States

- Location within California

Highest point
- Peak: Pechacho
- Elevation: 1,743 m (5,719 ft)
- Coordinates: 33°9′53″N 116°37′14″W

Geography
- Country: United States
- State: California
- District: San Diego County
- Range coordinates: 33°9′52.149″N 116°37′12.069″W
- Topo map: USGS Santa Ysabel 15 min.

The Volcan Mountains are a mountain range of the Peninsular Ranges system, located in the East County region of San Diego County, California.

== Geography ==
The Volcans are a northwest–southeast range with an approximate length of 13 miles (21 km) and width of 7.5 miles (12.1 km).

They define the western side of San Felipe Valley, with the San Felipe Hills defining the east side.

Julian and the historic Coleman gold mining district lie on the southern margin of the range.

Lake Henshaw is just to the northwest.

== See also ==
- Volcanic Hills (California) — also in San Diego County.
- Mountain ranges of San Diego County, California
