= Rancho Valle de San Felipe =

Mexican land grant in present-day San Diego County, California

- Land Grant
- Interactive map of Rancho Valle de San Felipe
- Country: Mexico
- State: California
- County: San Diego
- Established: 1846
- Founder: Felipe Castillo

Area
  - Total: 9,972 km^{2} (3,850 sq mi)

Rancho Valle de San Felipe was a 9,972-acre (40.36 km^{2}) Mexican land grant in present-day San Diego County, California, given in 1846 by Governor Pío Pico to Felipe Castillo. The grant was located in the San Felipe Valley in the Laguna Mountains east of present-day Julian.

== History ==
The three square league Rancho Valle de San Felipe was granted to Felipe Castillo in 1846. On his death in 1848, Castillo left the land to his four children (brothers, Loreto, Manuel, and Refugio, and sister Elena).

The heirs sold the rancho to John Forster in 1850. John Forster (1815–1882), born in England, came to California in 1833. In 1837, he married Ysidora Pico, sister of Pío and Andrés Pico. John Forster was the grantee of Rancho de la Nación and later owner of the Rancho Santa Margarita y Las Flores.

With the cession of California to the United States following the Mexican-American War, the 1848 Treaty of Guadalupe Hidalgo provided that the land grants would be honored. As required by the Land Act of 1851, a claim for Rancho Valle de San Felipe was filed with the Public Land Commission in 1852, and the grant was patented to John Forster in 1866.

Forster sold Rancho Valle de San Felipe to François Louis Alfred Pioche (1818–1872), a San Francisco financier. In 1890 (40 years after the sale to Forster), Castillo's daughter unsuccessfully claimed one fourth of the grant.

The California Department of Fish and Wildlife acquired the rancho and it is now part of the San Felipe Valley Wildlife Area..

== San Felipe Station ==
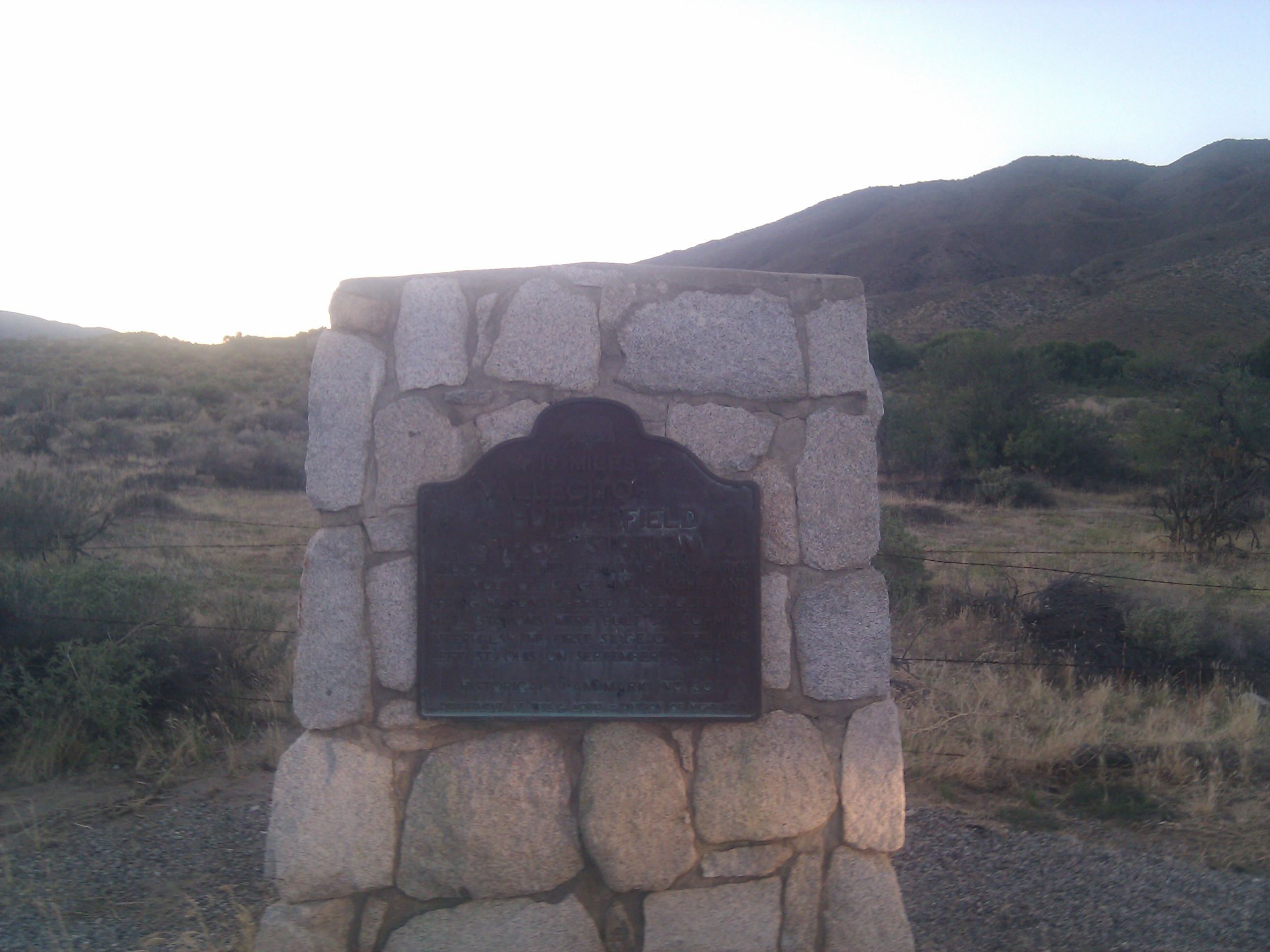
California Historical Landmark 304

The lands of the rancho near what is now Scissors Crossing, was used by travelers as a rest stop on the Southern Emigrant Trail to recover from the crossing of the Colorado Desert. From 1857 as a water and rest stop by the San Antonio-San Diego Mail Line.

Later it was San Felipe Station, a major stage stop on the Butterfield Overland Mail, being the headquarters for the Mail Agent in charge of the twelve stage stations between Warner's Ranch and Fort Yuma. San Felipe Station was located 10 miles southeast of Warner's Ranch and 18 miles northeast of Vallecito Station. The station served as a storage depot for up to 48 tons of barley and 36 tons of hay for the desert relay or swing stations. The surrounding meadows were used for replacement stage horses for the other stations to graze and recover before being returned to service. A harness maker, to repair or make new coach harness for the stagecoaches, two coaches and drivers were also stationed there. It also had a cook and a hotel keeper to provide food and beds for the hungry or weary traveler and living quarters for the staff and their families.

From 1861 to 1865 in the American Civil War it was a military outpost of the Union Army called Camp San Filipe, a rest stop on the road between California and Fort Yuma and the Arizona and New Mexico Territories.

After the war, later stage lines from California to Arizona used the station from 1867 to 1877, before the railroad reached Fort Yuma making the stage route obsolete.

The site of the San Felipe Station is located on private property just west and a little north of Scissors Crossing. 33°5′52″N 116°29′22″W

== See also ==
- Ranchos of California
- List of Ranchos of California
