= Teofulio Summit =

Mountain pass in California, U.S.

Coordinates: 33°12′17″N 116°36′13″W

Teofulio Summit, formerly Warner Pass, a pass that lies at an elevation of 3681 feet in the San Felipe Hills of the Peninsular Ranges of San Diego County, California. This pass was named for Teofulio Helm (1874-1967), a prominent member of the Cupeno Band of Mission Indians, who homesteaded in the area.

Teofulio Summit is the lowest crossing of the Peninsular Ranges between San Gorgonio Pass, fifty miles north in Riverside County, and San Matias Pass, two hundred miles south in the Baja California Peninsula. Teofulio Summit, is a watershed divide between the eastern watershed that flows into the Salton Sink and the west-flowing streams of the Pacific Ocean watershed.

== History ==
First discovered by Mexican soldiers, Teofulio Summit became the route of the Sonora Road into the coastal region of Southern California. The Sonora Road reestablished land communications between Alta California and Sonora, Mexico in the late 1820s. This route had been cut off by the Yuma Revolt in the 1780s.

Later, known as Warner Pass, named after Juan Jose Warner the owner of Warner's Ranch, it was the place where the Southern Emigrant Trail, the major southern route into California for Americans from the east in the middle 19th Century, passed over the mountains from the Colorado Desert to the coastal regions of Southern California. This made it important as the major gateway to Southern California until the completion of the Southern Pacific Railroad through San Gorgonio Pass to Yuma, Arizona in the 1870s.
