= San Felipe Hills (San Diego County) =

Low mountain range in San Diego County, Southern California, United States

- Location within California

Highest point
- Elevation: 1,392 m (4,567 ft)

Geography
- Country: United States
- State: California
- District: San Diego County
- Range coordinates: 33°11′0.146″N 116°33′13.064″W
- Topo map: USGS Ranchita

The San Felipe Hills are a low mountain range in eastern San Diego County, southern California.

== Geography ==
The range defines the eastern side of San Felipe Valley, with the Volcan Mountains defining the west side.

They run southwest of Ranchita, and northeast of Julian and the Iipay Nation of Santa Ysabel Reservation.

== Ecology ==
The southern section is within Anza-Borrego Desert State Park and supports Colorado Desert habitats. The northern section supports chaparral habitats.

== See also ==
- Mountain ranges of San Diego County, California
