= Tierra Blanca Mountains =

- Location within California

Highest point
- Elevation: 661 m (2,169 ft)

Geography
- Country: United States
- State: California
- District: San Diego County
- Range coordinates: 32°53′25.188″N 116°15′45.052″W
- Topo map: USGS Agua Caliente Springs

The Tierra Blanca Mountains are in San Diego County, California, between the Vallecito Mountains and the In-Ko-Pah Mountains. The range is located to the west of the community of Canebrake and the Carrizo Badlands.
