= Sawtooth Mountains (California) =

Mountain range in California

- Location within California

Highest point
- Peak: Red Top
- Elevation: 1,428 m (4,685 ft)
- Coordinates: 32°53′08″N 116°20′31″W

Geography
- Country: United States
- State: California
- District: San Diego County
- Range coordinates: 32°54′44.181″N 116°21′27.054″W
- Parent range: Peninsular Ranges
- Topo map: USGS Agua Caliente Springs

The Sawtooth Mountains are a mountain range of the Peninsular Ranges system in eastern San Diego County, California.

The Sawtooth Mountains are within the western Colorado Desert, southwest of Anza-Borrego Desert State Park and the Tierra Blanca Mountains. The Jacumba Mountains lie to the southeast.

The Sawtooth Mountains Wilderness is located within the range.
