= Carrizo Creek and Wash (California) =

Stream and arroyo in California, US

The Carrizo Creek and Carrizo Wash in California are a stream and an arroyo in San Diego County, California, and Imperial County, California.

The stream, Carrizo Creek, arises in the mountains of San Diego County, California, and terminates in Carrizo Wash in Imperial County, a tributary in turn to San Felipe Creek that terminates in the Salton Sea.

The source of California's Carrizo Creek is in San Diego County, 1.2 miles north of the California–Mexico State boundary, at 32°38′09″N 116°07′05″W at an elevation of 3,210 feet, on the west side of the divide between Jacumba Valley and the valley of upper Boulder Creek. Carrizo Creek flows west then north northwest through Jacumba Valley then north through Carrizo Gorge and Carrizo Canyon, into Carrizo Valley where it is joined on the left by Vallecito Creek, as it turns east through the Carrizo Badlands where 3 miles east of the site of the old Carrizo Creek Station, at an elevation of 322 feet (98 meters), it becomes Carrizo Wash. Carrizo Wash terminates at its confluence with San Felipe Creek at 33°05′54″N 115°55′38″W.

== History ==
Carrizo Creek, its wash and its tributary, Vallecito Creek, were the watercourses that carved the pathway from the Peninsular Ranges of Southern California through the Carrizo Badlands to the Colorado Desert. They provided a pathway and water for Native Americans travelers out into the desert and on to the Colorado River along the course of the distributary New or Alamo Rivers. Subsequently, from 1828 it was similarly used by Mexican travelers on the route of the Sonora Road to Alta California, then by Americans on Cooke's Wagon Road and its successor the Southern Emigrant Trail. It was the route taken into California by the San Antonio–San Diego Mail Line and Overland Mail Company. Both companies used Carrizo Creek Station at the lower end if the creek in the badlands.

== Carrizo Wash ==
Carrizo Wash is a wash with its head at the mouth of Carrizo Creek in the Carrizo Badlands located at 32°53′03″N 115°59′41″W, and its mouth at its confluence with San Felipe Creek, at an elevation of −138 feet (−42 meters) below sea level.
