= Vallecito Creek (California) =

River in California, United States

Vallecito Creek is a tributary stream of Carrizo Creek in San Diego County, California.

Vallecito Creek has its source at the southeast end of Mason Valley 32°59′05″N 116°25′19″W as a continuation of Vallecito Wash. From its mouth the creek arises and flows southeastward about 19 mi (31 km), through Vallecito (Little Valley) and Carrizo Valley to its confluence with Carrizo Creek.
