= Volcanic Hills (California) =

- Location within California

Highest point
- Elevation: 1,470 ft (450 m)

Geography
- Country: United States
- State: California
- Region: Colorado Desert
- District: San Diego County
- Range coordinates: 32°47′7.206″N 116°8′48.056″W
- Topo map: USGS Sweeney Pass

The Volcanic Hills are a low mountain range in the Colorado Desert, near the border in southern San Diego County, California.
