= Carrizo Creek Station =

Overland Mail stagecoach stop in California

Coordinates: 32°52′30″N 116°6′1″W

Carrizo Creek Station is a former stage station of the San Antonio–San Diego Mail Line and Butterfield Overland Mail, located in Imperial County, California, just east of the San Diego County line. It lies within the boundaries of Anza-Borrego Desert State Park just west of the Carrizo Impact Area. Its site is located along the bank of Carrizo Creek.

== History ==
Carrizo, the site of the Carrizo Stage Station, lies on the Southern Emigrant Trail where Carrizo Creek flowed at the surface most of the year, and often provided the first flowing water to travelers on that route after they had left the Colorado River. Earlier, Carrizo had been a watering place for the local Native Americans, Spanish explorers, Mexican traders, American fur trappers and soldiers.

== Military Storehouse ==
The 1855 Railroad Survey expedition camped at Carrizo in June and its report described the place:

Carrizo creek runs over a series of stratified clays and gravels, derived from the decomposition of the primary rocks, chiefly syenite, loose drifted pebbles of which cover up the sand beds of the valley. Through this sand the Carrizo, in places, cuts its way very deeply. At the camp (June 3) on the river, the sand is deposited unconformable to the primitive rocks, upon whose side it reposes. It is mainly composed of disintegrated syenitic rock.

The storekeeper inhabiting the adobe house, newly built at camp, informed us that, for the eight months previous to our visit, it had not rained but once, and then for eight hours heavily; at the foot of such lofty, rough crested hills, rain, indeed, must be scarce, yet the evidences of running water are displayed in the base of the triangular valleys leading out from the range, where large stones are washed out of the clay and sand and heaped together, the result of existing causes.

The temperature at Carrizo on the 3d June at noon was 100°F, and rose to 102° later in the day. The effect of this heat was visible on the stream, which ceased flowing about 11 o'clock, and did not recommence until near 4 p. m., being absorbed or evaporated during the interval; two miles below it completely disappears in the sand.

At Carrizo Creek the mail company used the adobe constructed by the military in June 1855, as a station building. It was described by a correspondent as an old adobe house with the thatch roof burned off, occupied by William Mailland in the fall of 1857.

== Stagecoach Station ==
The station at Carrizo Creek became an important link in the San Antonio-San Diego Mail Line. It functioned as one of seven major stations west of the Rio Grande River. Passengers at Carrizo Creek disembarked here to change coaches leaving the east-bound stage from San Diego and boarded another that ran between Carrizo and Fort Yuma. The coach remained at the station until the other returned with west-bound passengers that had boarded in Yuma. Watering stations were established at an average of 30 mile intervals

That first Carrizo station keeper, William Mailland, in a drunken fit brutally killed his Native American wife in May 1858. Fearing revenge by the local natives and arrest by authorities after he sobered up, he was said to have fled into the desert and was believed to have died, while an acquaintance claimed he had been seen east of the Colorado River, fleeing to Sonora.

Under the Butterfield Overland Mail, Carrizo Station, like other stations, functioned as a changing or "swing" station that replaced teams with fresh horses. Carrizo had a single keeper, a hostler, who took care of the livestock and with the driver changed the teams.

After the Butterfield Overland Mail shut down in March 1861, the Union Army used the station as a camp on their road to Fort Yuma and Arizona Territory. It became a stage station again for the Banning and Thomlinson lines from 1867 until 1877 when the railroad arrived in Fort Yuma making the route obsolete.

== Modern Discoveries At The Site ==
During March and April 2001, a systematic archaeological testing program was implemented at the Carrizo Stage Station site. The initial field test excavations and artifact analysis confirmed the presence of two structures and remains of the 1857 to 1877 Carrizo Stage Station. After excavation it was subsequently reburied and erosion protection features were installed to prevent further damage to the site.
