= Yaqui Pass, California =

Mountain pass, San Diego County

Yaqui Pass
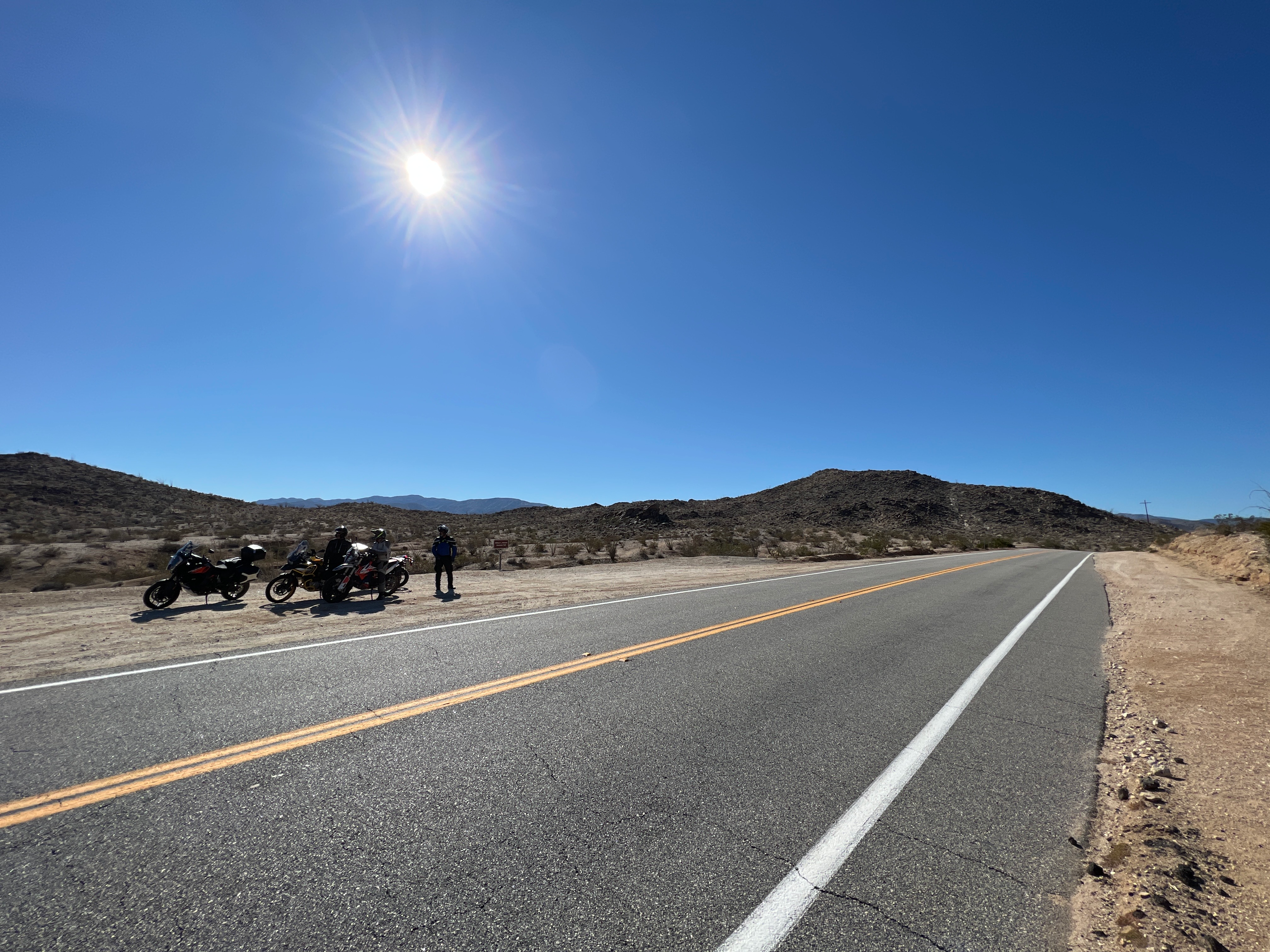
- Yaqui Pass on San Diego Count Road S3

- Location within California
- Elevation: 1,742 feet (531 m)
- Traversed by: CR S3

Third Approach
- Location: San Diego County, California, U.S.
- Range: Santa Rosa Mountains
- Coordinates: 33°08′47″N 116°21′06″W
- Topo map: USGS Sattley

Yaqui Pass is a mountain pass on CR S3 in San Diego County in the U.S. state of California. The pass lies at an elevation of 1,742 ft (531 m) and is located within Anza-Borrego Desert State Park approximately 2 mi (3.2 km) east of the SR 78 and traverses the Santa Rosa Mountains.

== History ==
Local historians have described the Yaqui Pass route as an "old Indian trail." The Yaqui Pass Road CR S3 was built in 1934–35 to connect with the new state highway SR 78 through the Narrows. It was paved by the military during World War II— first paved road in the valley. During World War II, Yaqui Pass was used by the Marines to get to Camp Ensign, near Clark Dry Lake. Yaqui Pass is named after the nearby Yaqui Well, referring to a Yaqui Indian of Sonora, Mexico, who lived with a local Kumeyaay woman near the well sometime prior to 1909.

== Images ==
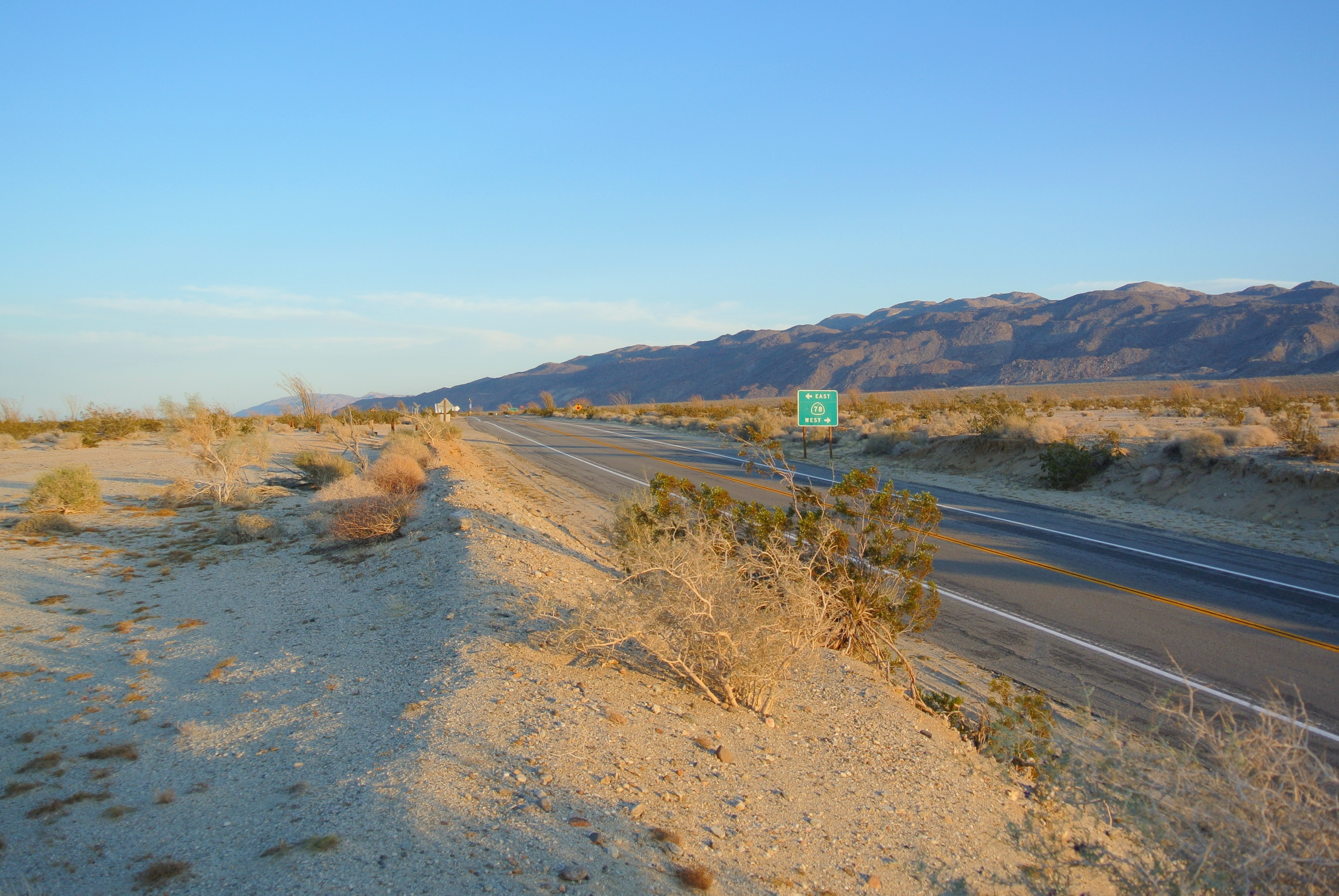
CR S3 and SR 78 junction

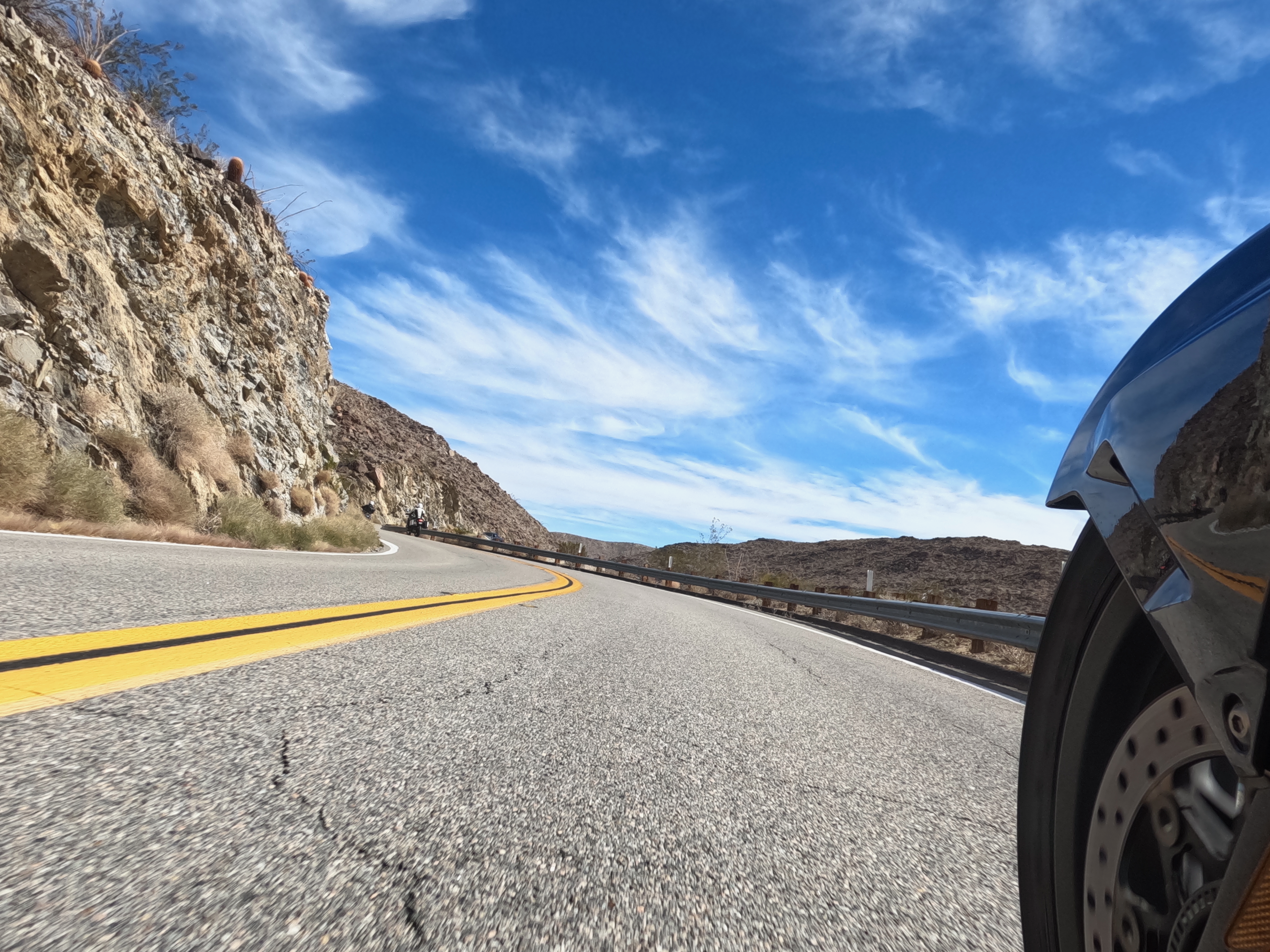
Yaqui Pass Road CR S3 west of Yaqui Pass Gallery

== See also ==
- List of mountain passes in California
- California county routes in zone S
- Anza-Borrego Desert State Park
- Borrego Springs, California
- Yaqui Well
