= Erin Hanson =

American artist (born 1981)

- Born: 1981
- Known for: Contemporary artist
- Website: erinhanson.com

Erin Hanson (born 1981) is an American painter known for her "Open Impressionism style of work characterized by minimal brush strokes and the impasto application of paint."

== Early years ==
Born in 1981, Hanson began painting as a child, learning oils, watercolor, pen and ink, pastels and life drawing from art instructors. She began commissioning portraits of her neighbor's pets at age 10 and by age 12, she was employed after school by a mural studio, learning the techniques of acrylics on the grand scale of 40-foot canvases. Hanson has said that her first encounter with the Vincent van Gogh painting "Irises" in elementary school was decisive and marked the beginning of her appreciation for Impressionism. A high school scholarship took her to Otis College of Art and Design where she focused on figure drawing. After graduation from University of California, Berkeley, Hanson moved to Las Vegas, Nevada, where she began an import business, but her rock climbing and hiking hobbies ultimately led her back to her childhood passion for painting.

== Technique ==
Hanson employs an "Open Impressionism," style of painting that uses wide brush strokes and an alla prima technique where the paint is applied wet on wet without letting earlier layers dry. Hanson's typical style mixes paint from a limited palette of four or five colors with minimal brush strokes. During an interview, Hanson said she takes dozens of reference photos, which she can later use in the studio before she paints. In 2022, Hanson was one of several professional artists who learned their technique was included without their permission in a data set used to train a text-to-image AI computer program.

== Subjects and influences ==
Hanson's paintings depict the natural beauty of the United States and the American West. Her frequent trips to National Parks and other places in nature include backpacking expeditions, rock climbing and photo safaris. Hanson has mentioned that she has been inspired by Red Rock Canyon near Las Vegas, Nevada, and Mojave Desert in Southern California. Some places captured in her paintings include Paso Robles, Joshua Tree National Park and the Anza-Borrego Desert.

== Shows and exhibitions ==
Hanson's work has been displayed in fine art galleries and museums such as the St. George Art Museum, La Salle University Art Museum, Mattatuck Art Museum and Bone Creek Museum of Agrarian Art. Her painting "Desert in Color" won Best of Show at the 2019 Cowgirl Up! art show in Wickenburg, Arizona, which features top women artists from across the nation.
