= Ocotillo Airport =

General aviation airport in Ocotillo Wells, California, United States

- IATA: none; ICAO: none; FAA LID: L90

Summary
- Airport type: Public
- Owner: County of San Diego
- Serves: Ocotillo Wells, California
- Elevation AMSL: 160 ft / 49 m
- Coordinates: 33°08′52″N 116°07′54″W
- Website: www.sandiegocounty.gov/dpw/airports/ocotillo.html
- Interactive map of Ocotillo Airport

Runways
Direction	Length		Surface
Direction	ft	m	Surface
13/31	4,210	1,283	Dirt
9/27	2,475	754	Dirt

Statistics (2008)
- Aircraft operations: 405
- Source: Federal Aviation Administration

Ocotillo Airport (FAA LID: L90) is a county-owned, public-use airport in Ocotillo Wells, an unincorporated community in San Diego County, California, United States.

== Facilities and aircraft ==
Ocotillo Airport covers an area of 353 acres (143 ha) at an elevation of 160 feet (49 m) above mean sea level. It has two runways with dirt surfaces: 13/31 is 4,210 by 150 feet (1,283 x 46 m) and 9/27 is 2,475 by 150 feet (754 x 46 m). For the 12-month period ending December 31, 2010, the airport had 810 general aviation aircraft operations, an average of 68 per month. No aircraft was based at the airport during that time.

== US Navy World War II ==
During World War II the airport was used by the US Navy and called Naval Outlying Field, Ocotillo Dry Lake. It was used for training and to support Borrego Valley Maneuver Area, Benson Bombing Range and the Borrego Hotel Target Area, as a bub base of Naval Air Base Salton Sea in support of San Diego Naval Air Station. The US Navy returned the airport to the county in 1956. The airport opened in the late 1920s for private planes. In the late 1930 that Navy started to land planes at the private airport and took over the airport when the war started.

== See also ==
- California during World War II
