= Borrego Valley Maneuver Area =

California training base during World War II

- Part of US Navy
- Borrego Springs, California
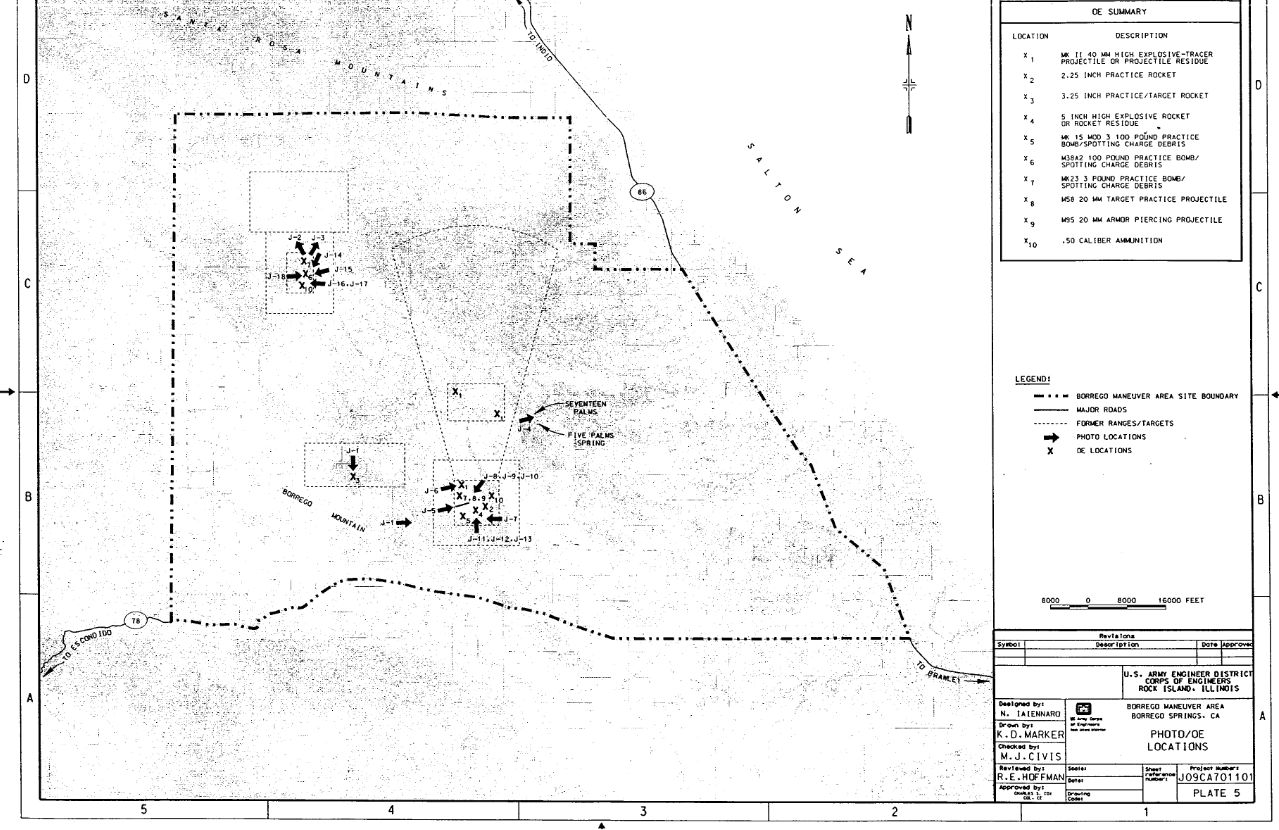
- Map Borrego Valley Maneuver Area

Site information
- Type: Military training base
- Owner: United States of America
- Controlled by: United States Army

Location
- Coordinates: 33°16′23″N 116°06′36″W

Site history
- Built: 1942
- In use: 1942-1944
- Demolished: 1945
- Events: US Army, Navy and Marines Training for WW2

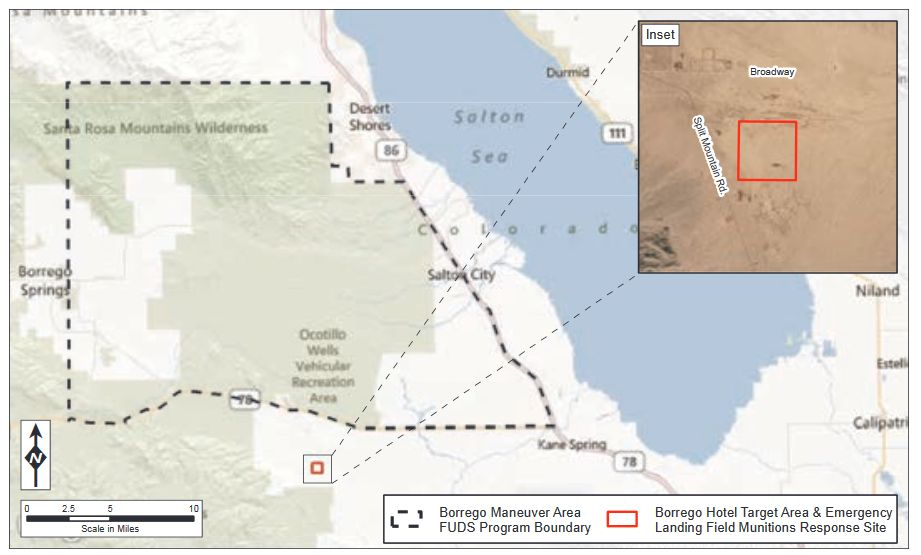
Borrego Hotel Target Area in red and Borrego Valley Maneuver Area

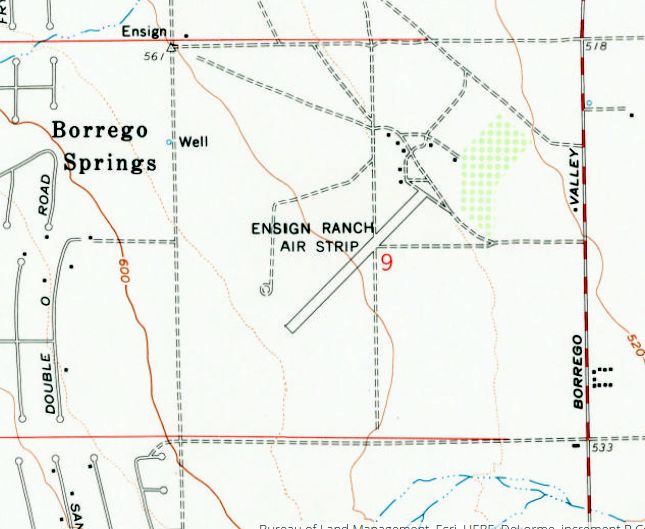
Map of Ensign Ranch Airfield

Borrego Valley Maneuver Area also called the Borrego Springs Naval Maneuver Area was a US Army Anti-Aircraft Training Center (AARTC) and a subcamp of Camp Callan. Located near Borrego Springs, California in San Diego County in the Imperial Valley. Opened in March 1942 and in use until August 1944, it was operated by the Western Defense Command. The Marine Corps also used the site to train troops in driving army vehicles. The site was picked as it was 400 square miles, 255,840 acres, of barren desert, barren mountains, and badlands. When it closed, the land returned to the State of California. Built at the site were bombing stations, strafing stations, and rocket targets. Also installed was anti-aircraft artillery for training. First week troop did dry run training and the second week live-fire training. Ammo fired was from .33cal to 90mm. The US Navy trained in the bombing, gunnery, and rocketry ranges. The California Institute of Technology helped with the rocket training. The air support for the base was Naval Outlying Landing Field Clark's Dry Lake, Naval Outlying Field, Ocotillo Dry Lake and Borrego Hotel Naval Outlying Landing Field.

== Camp Ensign ==
In the Borrego Valley Maneuver Area the US Marines built Camp Ensign at the site of the Ensign Ranch in Borrego Springs in 1943. Troops from San Diego came to the camp for training for two weeks. The training was in driving military trucks at night. The former Base Headquarters is now near the Borrego Springs Spa and Resort. The site was Ensign Ranch date palm orchards before the camp.

== Ensign Ranch Airfield ==
Ensign Ranch Airfield was a single northwest–southeast unpaved runway built-in 1943 just south of Camp Ensign to support the camp. There are no remains of the former field. The site is now part of the Borrego Springs Spa and Resort.33.233°N 116.357°W

== Borrego Hotel Target Area ==
About 3 miles south of the Borrego Valley Maneuver Area was the 222 acres Borrego Hotel Target Area. Borrego Hotel bombing target had three circles that the Navy used for San Diego Naval Air Station's aircraft carrier plane high-altitude bombing, dive-bombing and strafing. Near the Target Area was supported by the Naval Outlying Field, Ocotillo Dry Lake. The Target Area opened in 1941 and closed in 1955. In 1956 the land was sold and is now private property just south of California State Route 78.

== Borrego Hotel Naval Outlying Landing Field ==
About 3 miles south of the Borrego Valley Maneuver Area was the Borrego Hotel Naval Outlying Landing Field. Landing Field was used for emergency landing activities. The Landing Field had two dirt runways built on Halfhill Dry Lake. The site was used from 1941 to 1955. On 6 6 September 1956 the land was sold. There are no remains of the former field.33.09°N 116.1°W

== Benson Bombing Range ==
Benson Bombing Range also called the Benson/Ocotillo Dry Lake Range was used for bombing, dive-bombing and strafing training. The 353 acre Range was located on the Benson Dry Lake and Ocotillo Dry Lake near Ocotillo Wells, California.

== See also ==
- Anza-Borrego Desert State Park
- California during World War II
- Salton Sea east of the Maneuver Area
