= Ocotillo Wells, California =

Unincorporated community in California, United States

Ocotillo Wells
- Unincorporated community
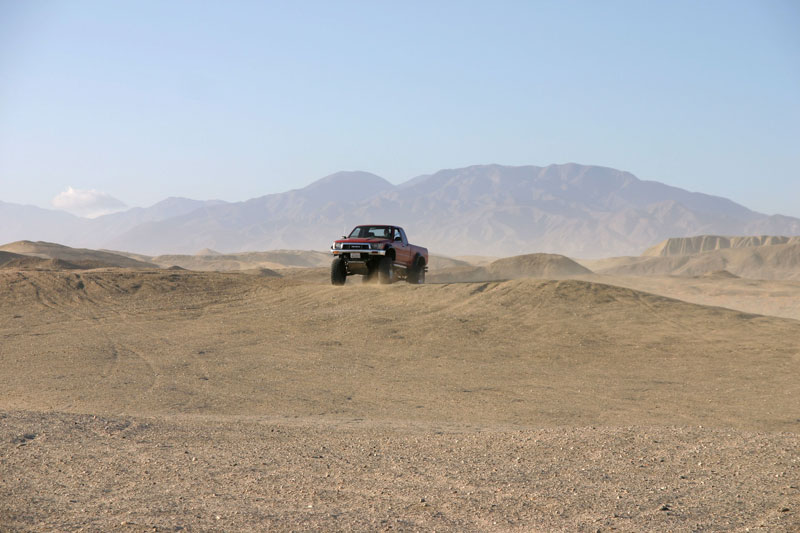
- A 4x4 truck at the Ocotillo Wells State Vehicular Recreation Area

- Location within the state of California Ocotillo Wells (the United States)
- Coordinates: 33°08′40″N 116°08′03″W
- Country: United States
- State: California
- County: San Diego
- Time zone: UTC-8 (Pacific (PST))
  - Summer (DST): UTC-7 (PDT)
- ZIP codes: 92004
- Area code: 760

Ocotillo Wells is an unincorporated community in San Diego County, California, United States. It is 3 miles (4.8 km) west of the Imperial County line on California State Route 78 at an elevation of 163 feet (50 m). The name became official in 1962 when it was adopted for federal use by the US Board on Geographic Names. A federally recognized variant name, Ocotillo, can cause confusion with the community of Ocotillo, California, in Imperial County, 29 mi (47 km) to the south on Interstate 8.

The ZIP Code is 92004 and the community is in area code 760. The number prefix for wired telephones is 767, which is shared with Borrego Springs.

== Local landmarks ==
Ocotillo Airport has two dirt runways. Runway extents are marked by white paving blocks. The Los Puertecitos Historic Site is on California State Route 78 about 1.5 miles (2.4 km) west of the community. Gasoline is available in Borrego Springs (17 mi or 27 km west), in Westmorland (18 mi or 29 km east) and at the Blu-In Cafe (3 mi or 4.8 km east). Gas sales resumed at the Blu-In as of 10/31/24.

Several other small businesses sell off-road accessories and rent all-terrain vehicles. Most businesses in the area are closed during the summer months. My Desert Rose, which was a traditional restaurant located at the intersection of State Route 78 and Split Mountain Road, burned down in 2008.

Iron Door bar and restaurant

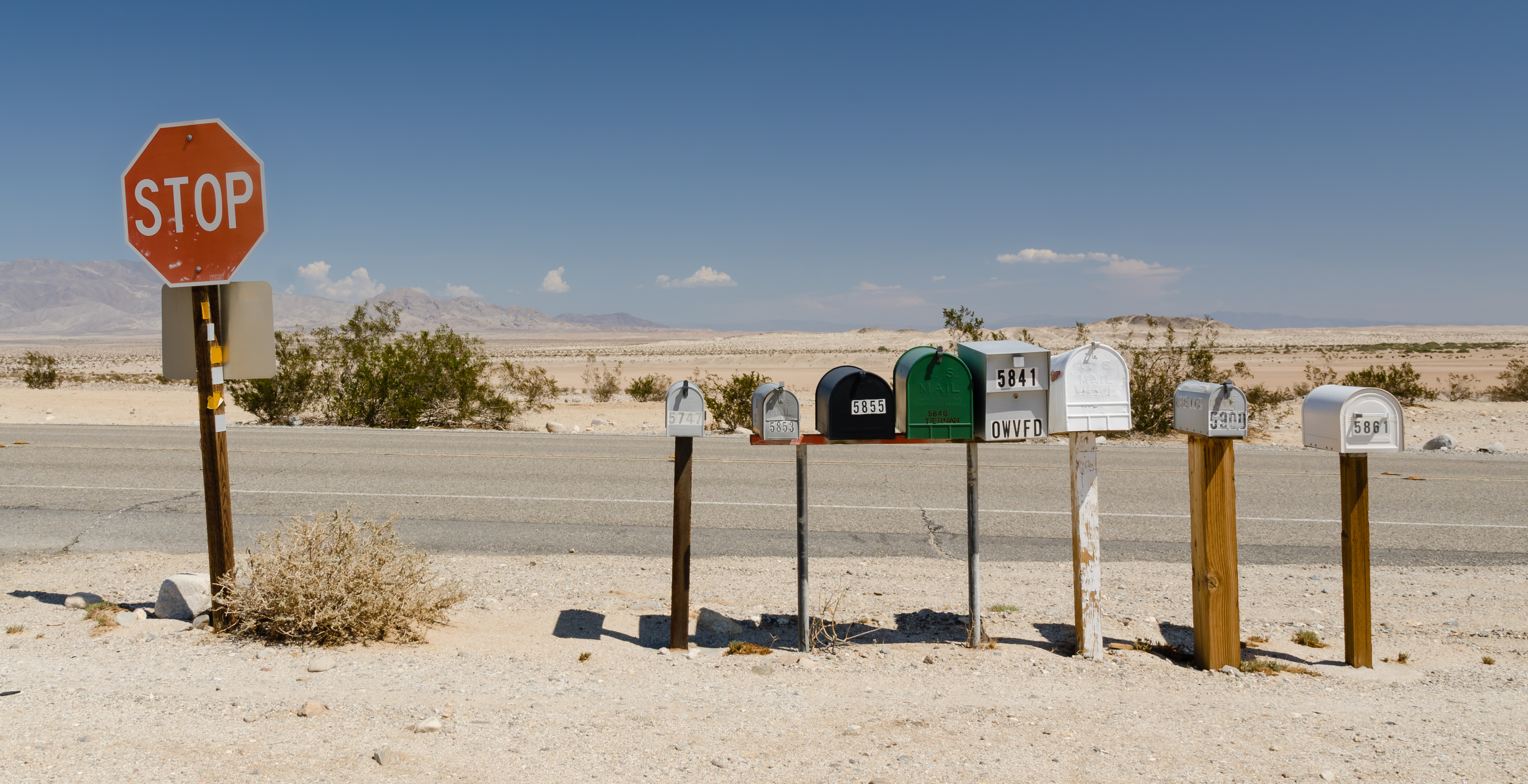
Letterboxes in the desert near Ocotillo Wells

The Split Mountain Store and the Iron Door are located about 1 mile (1.6 km) south of State Route 78 on Split Mountain Road. Both of these businesses are open part-time during the summer and full-time during the cooler months. The Split Mountain Store stocks groceries, beer, and parts for sand buggies and trucks. The Iron Door, a small bar, has two pool tables and serves beer, wine and some food. Local artifacts are on display in the bar, where several layers of decorated dollar bills are stapled to the walls.

== Climate ==
Ocotillo Wells has a hot desert climate (Köppen climate classification: BWh) with short, mild winters and long, extremely hot summers.

Climate data for Ocotillo Wells, California (normals 2003–2020, extremes 2003–present)
Month	Jan	Feb	Mar	Apr	May	Jun	Jul	Aug	Sep	Oct	Nov	Dec	Year
Record high °F (°C)	88 (31)	92 (33)	101 (38)	108 (42)	115 (46)	124 (51)	122 (50)	122 (50)	121 (49)	112 (44)	99 (37)	89 (32)	124 (51)
Mean maximum °F (°C)	80.1 (26.7)	83.2 (28.4)	93.8 (34.3)	101.0 (38.3)	106.4 (41.3)	115.4 (46.3)	117.6 (47.6)	116.2 (46.8)	112.1 (44.5)	102.1 (38.9)	90.8 (32.7)	79.3 (26.3)	119.0 (48.3)
Mean daily maximum °F (°C)	68.8 (20.4)	73.1 (22.8)	79.6 (26.4)	85.7 (29.8)	93.7 (34.3)	102.3 (39.1)	108.1 (42.3)	107.8 (42.1)	101.9 (38.8)	90.7 (32.6)	78.6 (25.9)	68.2 (20.1)	88.2 (31.2)
Daily mean °F (°C)	58.8 (14.9)	62.4 (16.9)	68.7 (20.4)	73.6 (23.1)	81.4 (27.4)	88.9 (31.6)	95.7 (35.4)	95.7 (35.4)	89.9 (32.2)	79.1 (26.2)	67.1 (19.5)	57.6 (14.2)	76.6 (24.8)
Mean daily minimum °F (°C)	48.7 (9.3)	51.8 (11.0)	57.8 (14.3)	61.4 (16.3)	69.2 (20.7)	75.5 (24.2)	83.3 (28.5)	83.5 (28.6)	77.9 (25.5)	67.5 (19.7)	55.7 (13.2)	47.0 (8.3)	64.9 (18.3)
Mean minimum °F (°C)	36.7 (2.6)	39.9 (4.4)	45.3 (7.4)	50.2 (10.1)	56.7 (13.7)	65.1 (18.4)	74.8 (23.8)	73.8 (23.2)	66.3 (19.1)	55.5 (13.1)	43.9 (6.6)	36.2 (2.3)	33.6 (0.9)
Record low °F (°C)	27 (−3)	28 (−2)	39 (4)	45 (7)	51 (11)	60 (16)	71 (22)	67 (19)	59 (15)	39 (4)	36 (2)	32 (0)	27 (−3)
Average precipitation inches (mm)	0.68 (17)	0.81 (21)	0.54 (14)	0.13 (3.3)	0.03 (0.76)	trace	0.28 (7.1)	0.37 (9.4)	0.26 (6.6)	0.25 (6.4)	0.19 (4.8)	0.49 (12)	4.03 (102)
Average precipitation days (≥ 0.01 in)	2.2	2.3	1.1	0.6	0.2	0.1	0.9	0.9	0.9	0.4	1.0	2.1	15.1
Source: NOAA

== Education ==
There are no schools in Ocotillo Wells. The community is served by the Borrego Springs Unified School District.

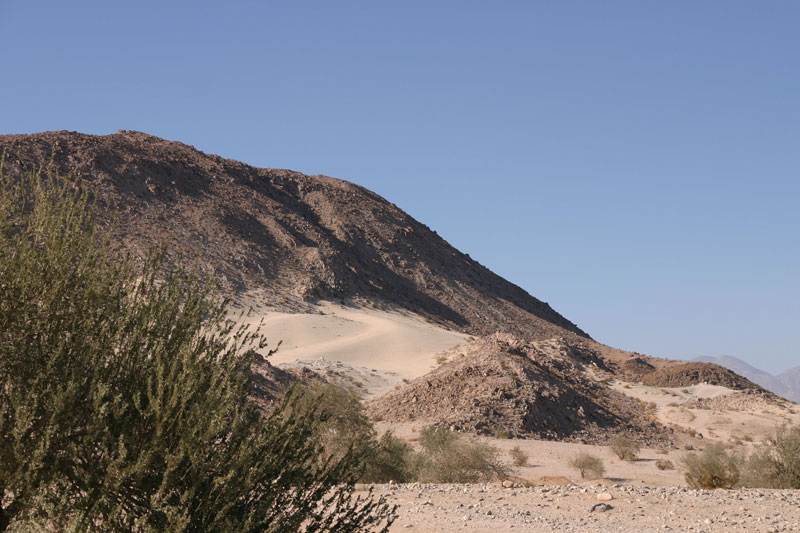
Blowsand is a popular attraction at Ocotillo Wells State Vehicular Recreation Area Wind Caves' south-west view of the East Mesa of Sandstone Mountains

== Off-road recreation ==
The California Department of Parks and Recreation operates the Ocotillo Wells State Vehicular Recreation Area which borders the community. This off-road vehicle area is part of the department's Southern Division, Ocotillo Wells District which is headquartered in Borrego Springs.

Free camping is available at numerous locations along State Route 78. The most popular of these are Main Street, Holmes Camp, County Line Road, and Pole Line Road. Each of these areas have ample access to numerous trails that provide a challenge to riders of all skill levels. Any vehicle with a license plate or off-road registration is able to operate in the park.

Natural features in the park include:

- Blowsand Hill, visible from State Route 78 and located between Ranger Station Road and Main Street
- Devil's Slide, a small sand dune adjacent to a steep rocky hill
- Shell Reef
- Gas Dome
- Pumpkin Patch

The Juan Bautista de Anza National Historic Trail travels through the Ocotillo Wells State Vehicular Recreation Area.

A map of these locations as well as numerous other trails is available at the ranger station.

Jumps at Shell Reef

== Military plane crashes in 2020 ==
On 29 September 2020, around 4:00 PM, a US Marine Corps (USMC) F-35B fighter aircraft was involved in a mid-air collision with a USMC KC-130J tanker during an aerial refueling exercise. The F-35B crashed near Ocotillo Wells in front of civilian onlookers who recorded the impact, with its pilot able to eject safely. The KC-130J made an emergency wheels-up landing in an agricultural field near Thermal, California, with all eight crew members surviving.

== In popular culture ==
Part of the 1971 film, The Andromeda Strain, was filmed on location in Ocotillo Wells, which featured an agricultural station and planted fields that were specifically constructed for the film.

== See also ==
- Anza Borrego Desert State Park
- Borrego Springs, California
- Borrego Valley Maneuver Area
- Salton Sea
- Westmorland, California
