= Parks Online Resources for Teachers and Students =

Online learning platform

Parks Online Resources for Teachers and Students (PORTS) is a free program that connects California State Parks to California's K-12 public schools. PORTS allows state park rangers to make live presentations to classrooms from parks throughout the state via videoconferencing. The program also provides full units of study that supplement the presentations that are in accordance with California's academic content standards.

== Units of study ==
Each unit of study includes one or more videoconferences between rangers and students and also includes resources such as lesson plans, digital images and video, historic documents, and other items. PORTS offers units of study in each of the following areas:

- Tidepools: presented from Crystal Cove State Park. Subject area: Science- Biology and Ecology.
- Paleontology: presented from Anza-Borrego Desert State Park. Subject area: biology and earth science.
- Elephant seals: presented from Año Nuevo State Reserve. Subject area: evolution, structure, and function in the northern elephant seal.
- Government: presented from California State Capitol. Subject area: US history and geography: growth and conflict.
- Travel brochure: presented from various locations. Subject area: English language arts.
- Special events custom programs

== Technology ==
PORTS contains two main technology components: online lesson plans and video conferencing.

1. Online lesson plans: In order to access the online lesson plans, the following products are necessary:

- Microsoft Windows or Macintosh computer connected to the internet
- A web browser such as Microsoft Internet Explorer, Firefox, or Safari
- Windows Media Player for Windows or Macintosh
- Apple QuickTime for Windows or Macintosh
- Microsoft Word
- Microsoft PowerPoint
- Adobe Reader for Windows or Macintosh
- Digital camera
- TV or LCD projector

2. Videoconferencing: In order to utilize PORTS's videoconferencing programs, the following products are necessary:

- High speed internet
- Videoconferencing unit
- TV or LCD projector

PORTS often loans equipment to schools that do not have access to any of the above items.

PORTS operates on California's K-12 High Speed Network (HSN). Because many of the programs require classrooms to have the capacity to receive information at speeds of up to 300 kilobyte per second, and some even require the classroom to be able to receive information at 768 KB per second or higher, it is advisable that classrooms be connected to the HSN if they wish to participate in these programs. However, it is possible to use PORTS without being connected to the HSN.

PORTS's video streaming files require that classrooms receive information at speeds of 300 KB per second or higher. They also require classrooms to have Windows Media Player installed. In order to utilize PORTS's videoconferencing programs, classrooms must have a connection speed of at least 384 KB per second. Some programs (i.e.- programs from remote locations, or programs that include a great deal of movement) may require higher speeds.
