= Yaqui Well =

California desert watering hole

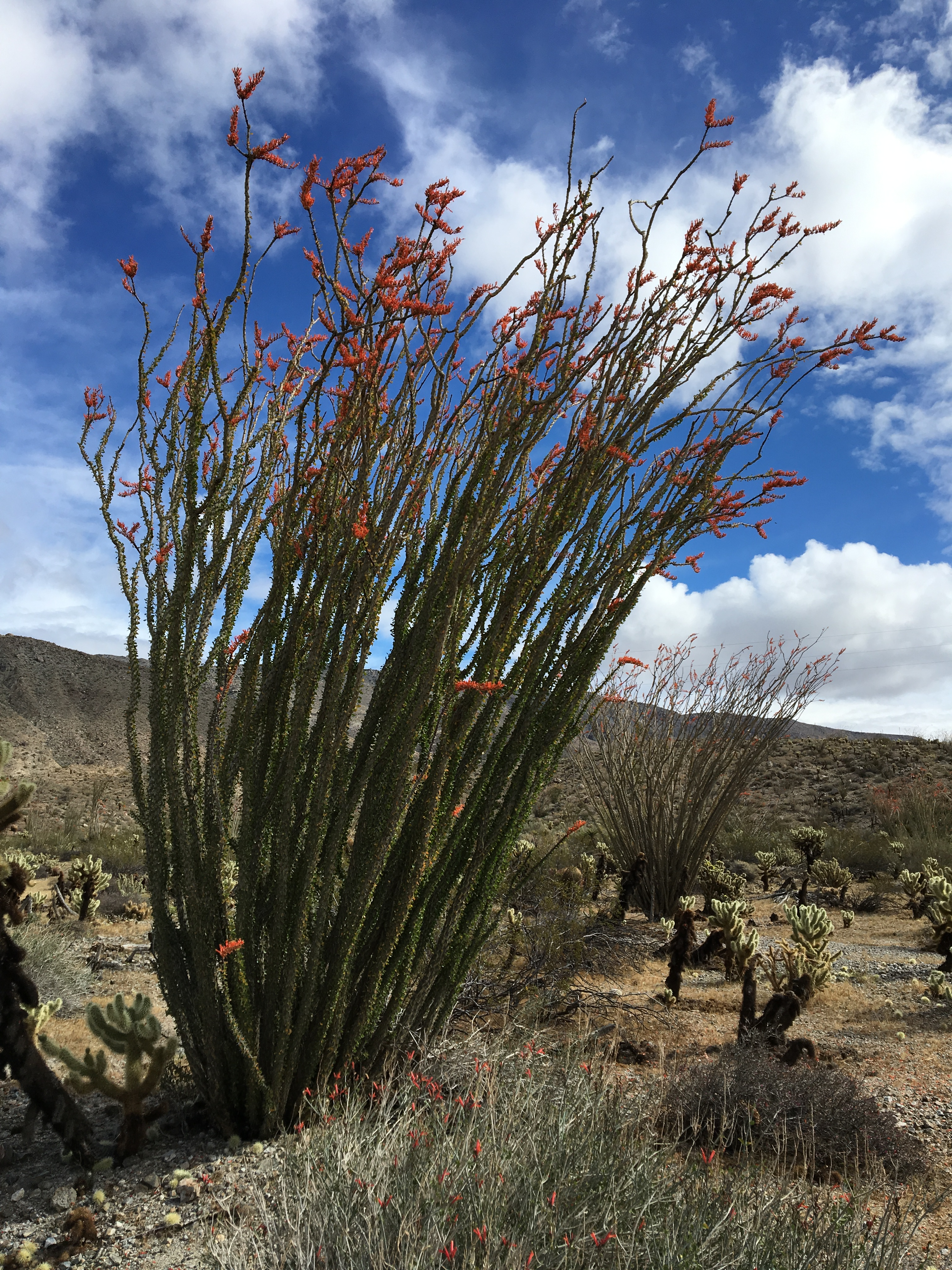
- Ocotillo along Yaqui Well Trail

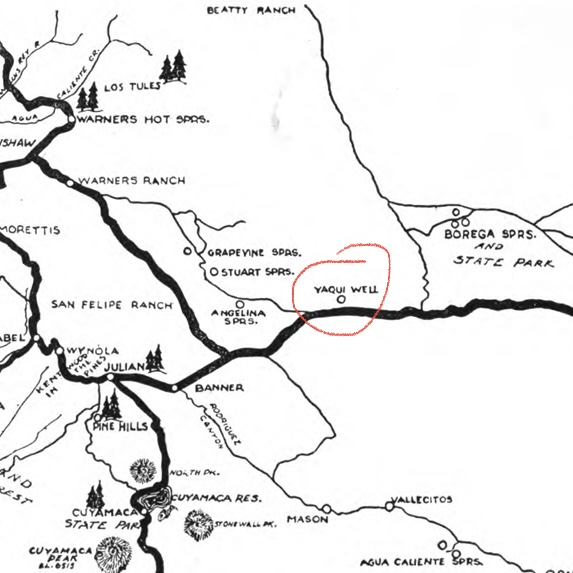
- San Diego, California, what to do and what to see (1938)
- Coordinates: 33.1395°N 116.3878°W
- Elevation: 1,460 ft (450 m)

Yaqui Well is a historic spring located in Anza-Borrego Desert State Park in southeastern San Diego County, California in the United States about 21.4 mi (34.4 km) east of Warner Springs. The watering hole can be reached by a popular 1.64 mi (2.64 km) one-hour (round trip) hiking trail starting at Tamarisk Grove Campground. The trail was described in the New York Times as a "flat, gentle hike—the kind that wraps around small, sloping hills, abuts a shallow canyon, and rewards its guests with an otherworldly view of the desert at the finale."

Nearby landmarks including Kenyon Overlook above Mezcal Bajada, and Cactus Loop Trail, which showcases teddy-bear cactus, beaver-tail cactus, barrel cactus, fishhook cactus, and cholla.

== Ecology ==
The term "spring" somewhat oversells the state of the well since the beginning of the 20th century. Hydrologically, Yaqui is classified as a seep; the water from the seep nourishes a very small riparian area, which hosts cattails. Local flora include desert ironwood, mesquite and mistletoe plants sown by Northern phainopepla birds. Geologically groundwater comes to the surface here because of the seep's location along San Felipe Fault within the San Felipe Creek watershed. Yaqui Well is also a popular birding spot, especially during spring migration in late April and early May. More than 140 bird species have been observed at the site, as well as a number of native bees and indigenous mammals including bobcats. On rare occasions, desert bighorn sheep have been known to use the well.

The rare plant Lyrocarpa coulteri was found in profusion at the well c. 1910. The first collection of a desert blindsnake (Leptotyphlops humilis cahuilae) was at Yaqui Well.

== History ==
The seep was likely a seasonal camp site for local people such as the Kumeyaay. Per a 1925 newspaper report, "At Yaqui Wells, so the old Indians at Warners say, was once a large village of their tribe." Remnants of the settlement visible in 1925 included "little circular depressions in the earth" where houses had stood, evidence of an acorn granary including olla pottery fragments, and an iron "grubbing hoe." A 1963 history described the still-visible ancient indigenous presence in the region:

Today, when traveling toward the east on California Highway 78, and after passing Tamarisk Campground, and looking toward the south, there are some low hills apart from the main desert range where there is sign of there having been some sizable Indian villages. The deep bedrock mortars indicate that these village sites served the Indians' way of life for many years. The nearest water to these village sites known to white man today are the Yaqui Well to the west and what is now known as Blue Spring to the south at the base of Pinyon Mountain.

— Lester Reed

The name reportedly comes from a Native American couple that lived near the seep; he was Yaqui, she was Kumeyaay. According to another account the well was deepened and framed by two Yaqui left to the task by W.H. Ball of the Ball's Freighters mule train. If there was no water in Buena Vista Creek or Cañada Verruga, Yaqui Well was the only water between Warners' Ranch and the Colorado River. Storied gold miner Peg Leg Smith may have camped at Yaqui Well while prospecting his claim. In 1872 a former Butterfield stagecoach driver named John McCain and his brothers built a road from Scissors Crossing or Sentenac Cienega over the hill and down Plum Canyon to the spring. In the early 20th century ranchers built a cabin and watering troughs and created a cattle watering station. The historic Paul Sentenac cabin was located near Yaqui Well, close to the present-day site of Tamarisk campground.

Circa 1918, the spring was recorded to have "poor but drinkable water," and the USGS posted a sign marking the well for travelers along the road. In 1923 the USGS published a detailed description.

Yaqui Well, sometimes called Indian Well, is in Grapevine Canyon, about 21 miles from Warner. Its location is marked by a Geological Survey sign, as it is an important though not especially desirable water hole. It is the last water obtainable on the eastward trip before reaching Borego Valley, or if the short cut on the county road is taken it is the last water for 25 or 30 miles, until San Felipe or Harper Well is reached. The well is really only a little open hole dug in clayey gravel at the foot of a low rocky spur. The pool of water is only a foot or two in diameter and in 1918 was walled up with boulders and covered with a large stone slab. The supply of water is small, apparently only a very slow seep out of clay and granitic rocks. Its quality is poor, and it appears stale. Nevertheless it is drinkable and according to report has been the salvation of a number of famished travelers.

— John S. Brown, A Guide to Desert Watering Places (1923)

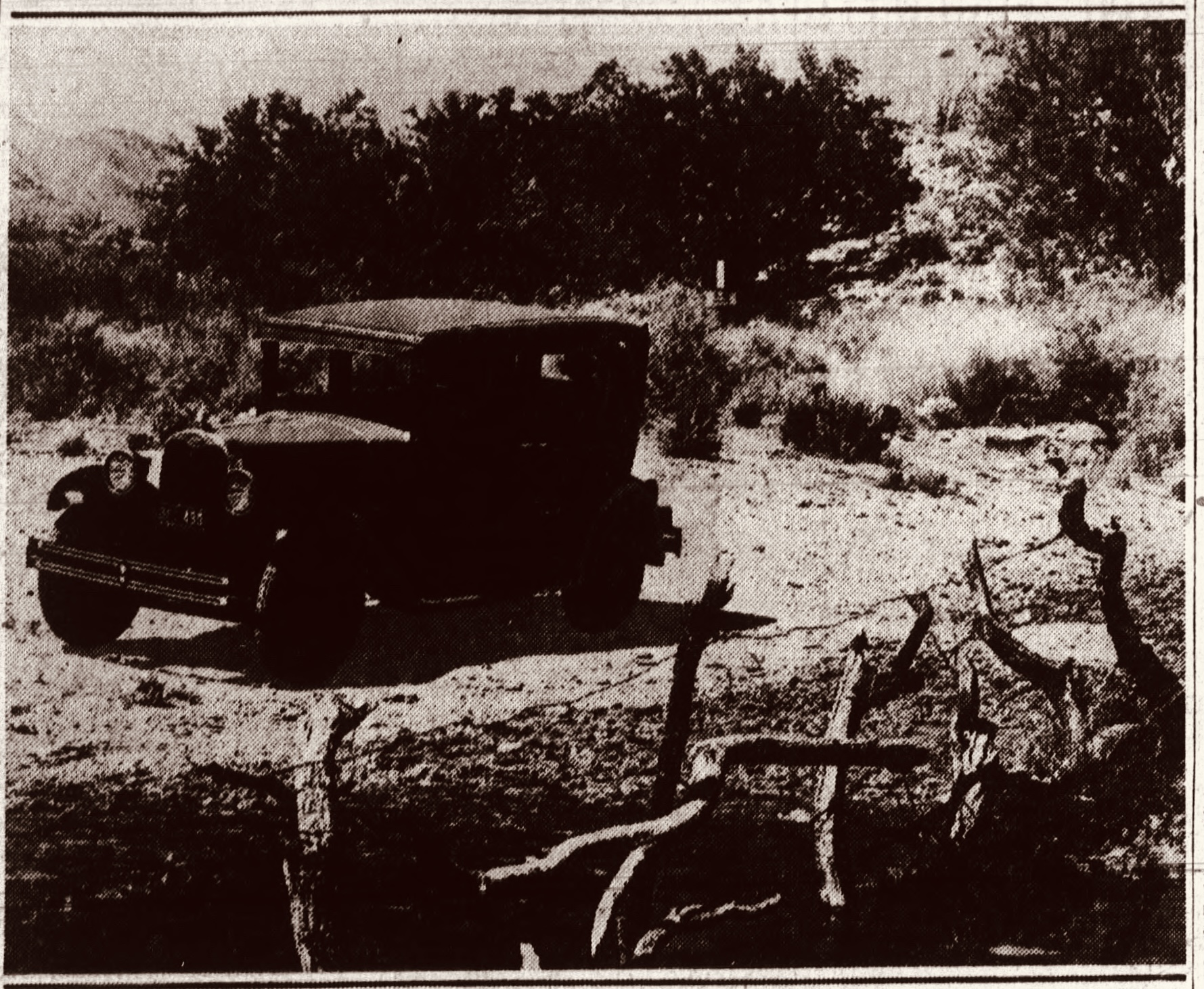
Yaqui Well as a driving destination for a Chevrolet motor car, c. 1928 (Oakland Tribune automobile section)

The Yaqui Pass throughway was built in 1929 by a chain-gang (convict labor) that camped at Yaqui Wells during the construction. The Yaqui Well hiking loop trail was constructed in 1973.

California folklore holds that the ghosts of long-dead prospectors, or travelers lost for eternity on the Southern Emigrant Trail, appear at the Well at night when the moon is full.

== See also ==
- Yaqui Pass
- Borrego Valley groundwater basin
- Ecology of California
- Juan Bautista de Anza National Historic Trail
