= Shelter Valley, California =

Unincorporated community in California, United States

Shelter Valley
- unincorporated community
- Location within the state of California Shelter Valley (the United States)
- Coordinates: 33°04′39″N 116°26′18″W
- Country: United States
- State: California
- County: San Diego
- Elevation: 2,320 ft (707 m)

Population
  - Total: 320
- Time zone: UTC-8 (Pacific)
  - Summer (DST): UTC-7 (PDT)
- ZIP codes: 92036
- Area codes: 442/760
- GNIS feature ID: 2664910

Shelter Valley is an unincorporated community in San Diego County in the U.S. state of California. It is located along County Route S2, two miles (3.2 km) south of its intersection with State Route 78 (known as Scissors Crossing) and 12 miles (19 km) east of Julian. It lies within the boundaries of Anza-Borrego Desert State Park and the geologic feature known as Earthquake Valley. The Pacific Crest Trail passes along the northern boundary of the community.

Anza Borrego Desert State Park acquired property to the north of the community in 1998, making Shelter Valley the second community (the first being nearby Borrego Springs) to be entirely surrounded by the park. The Sentenac Canyon and Cienega to the east of Scissors crossing were acquired in 1998. The state purchased parts of Rancho San Felipe to the west of Shelter Valley in 2004 that became part of the San Felipe Valley Wild Life Area and increased the contiguous extent of public lands surrounding the hamlet. In less than one year (2011 and 2012), multiple wildfires threatened the small community. The Banner Fire exited state park lands and entered the edge of the community, while the Vallecito Lightning Complex burned into the San Felipe Valley (connecting valley to the north of Earthquake Valley) after menacing the nearby town of Ranchita. All were successfully contained by CAL FIRE and the Shelter Valley Volunteer Fire Dept through the San Diego County Fire Authority and no structures were lost. Improvements to the Shelter Valley fire station were completed in 2012 to provide better quarters for the volunteers that provide protection for the surrounding region.

== Gallery ==
Shelter Valley, CA

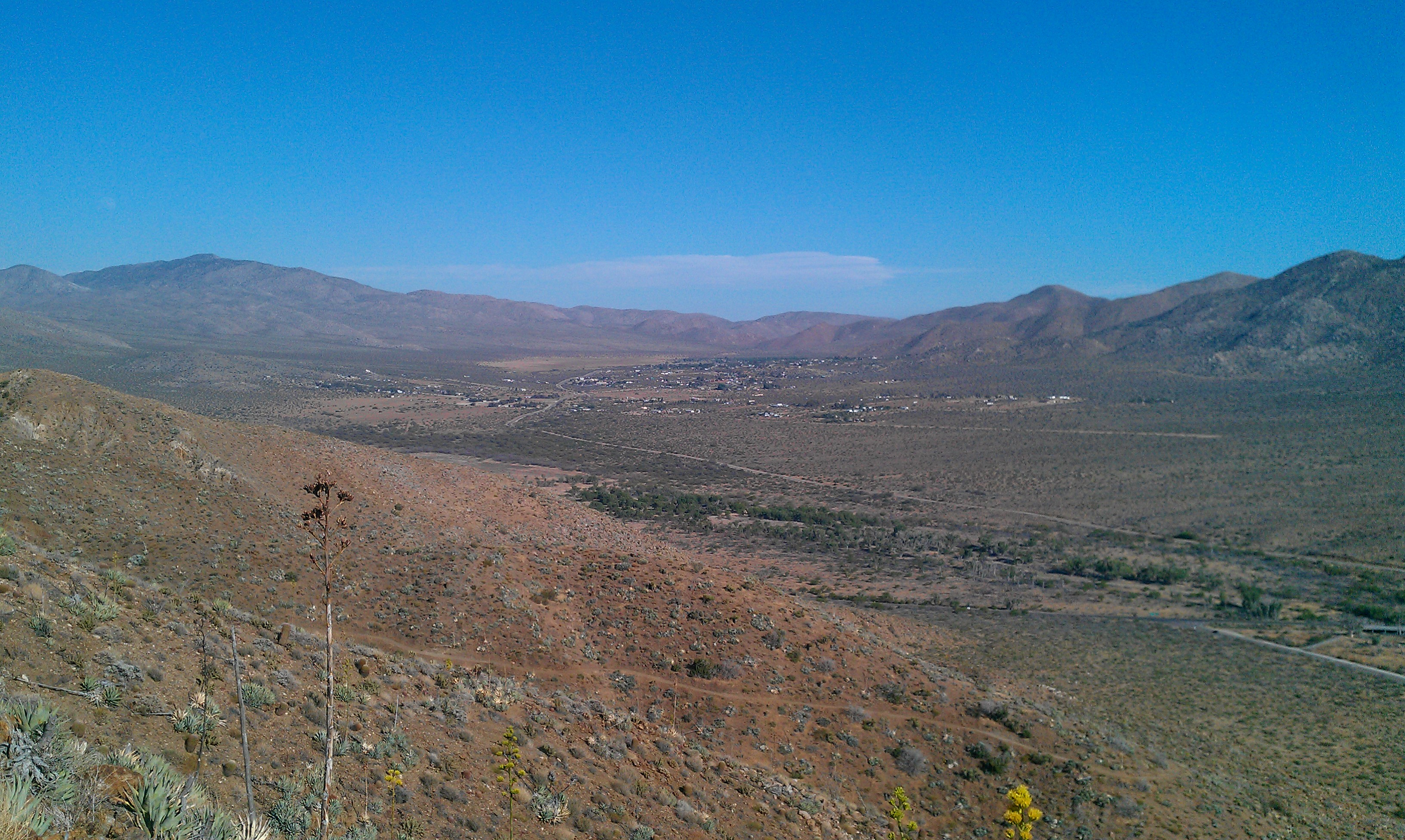
Shelter Valley seen from the north, along the Pacific Crest Trail.

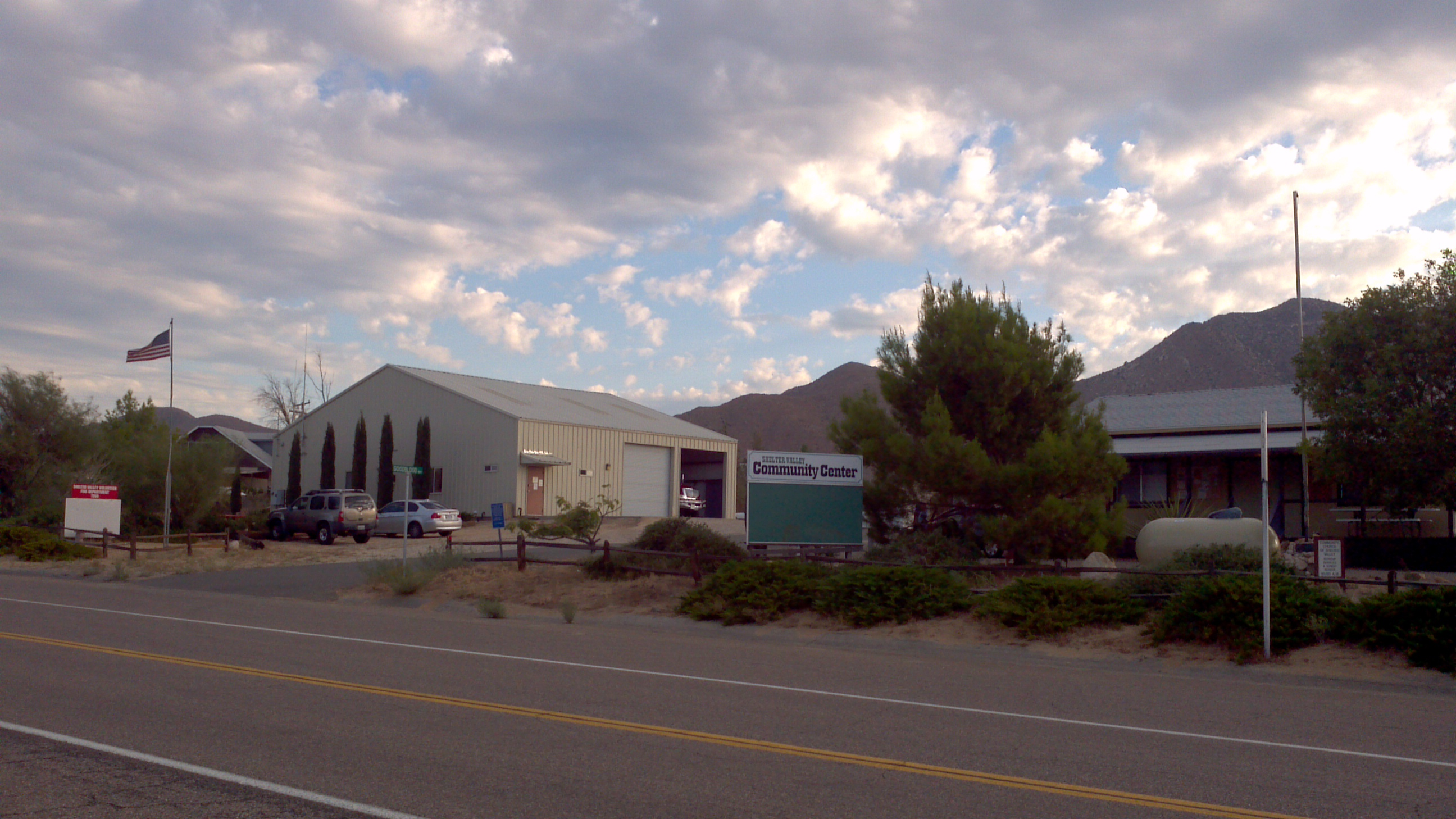
Shelter Valley California Fire Department and Community Center (2011)

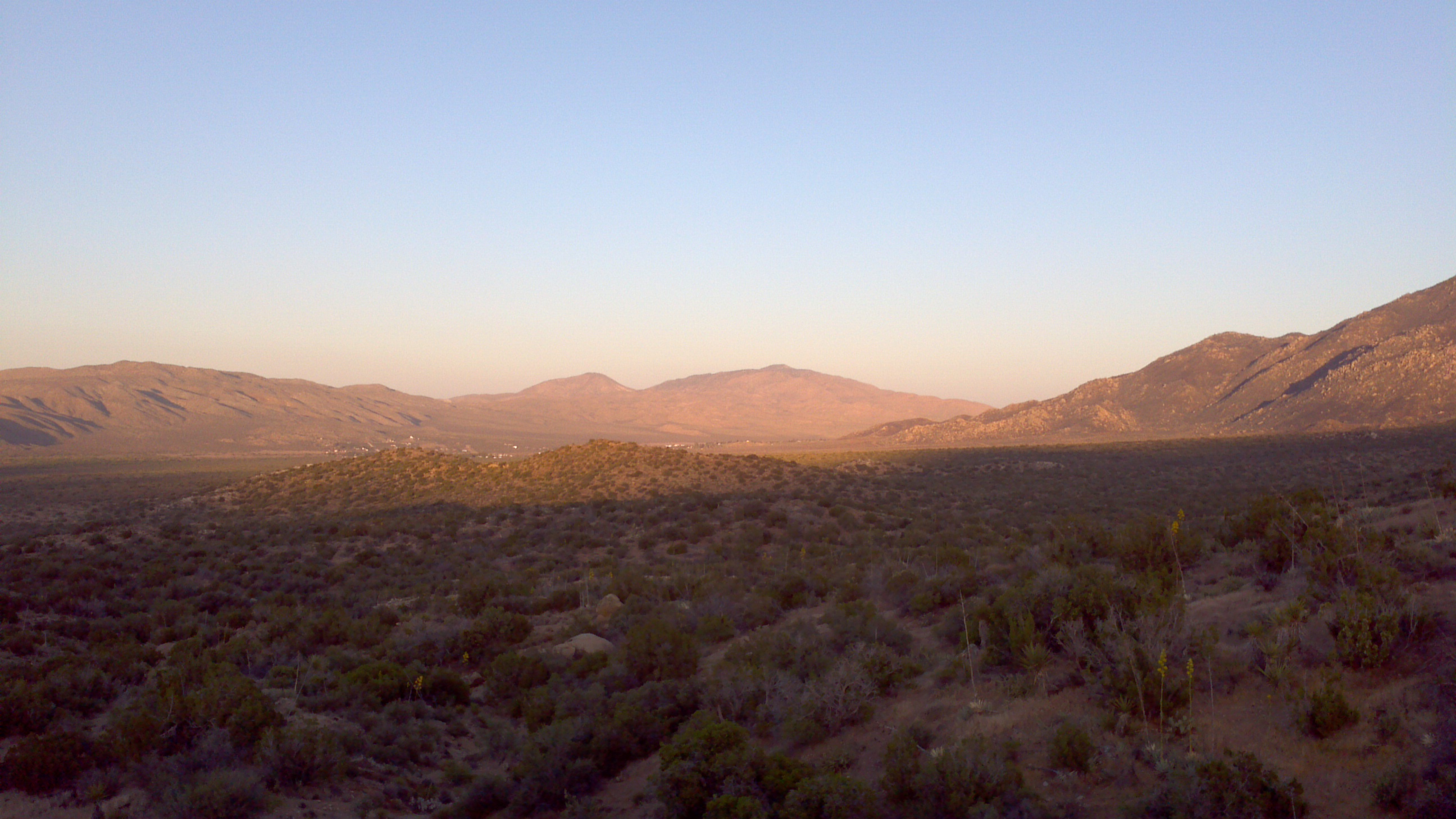
Shelter Valley (Earthquake Valley) after the 2012 Banner Fire. The foothills of Granite Mountain (the burn area) are visible to the right.
