= Field Clark's Dry Lake =

US Naval Station in California

Coordinates: 33.336°N 116.289°W

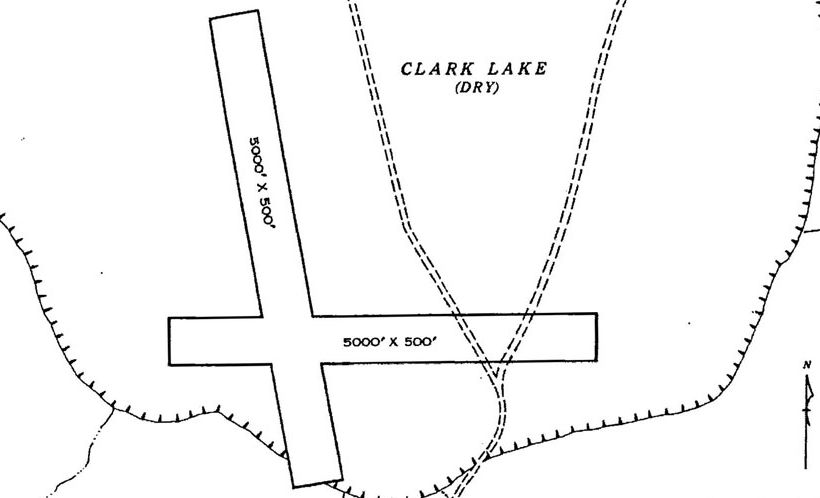
Naval Outlying Field Clark's Dry Lake

Naval Outlying Field Clark's Dry Lake was a United States Navy facility built for World War II. The site had two runways and a bombing range for training. The base was a subcamp of NAS San Diego. The site was built in 1938 and closed in 1962, but not used continuously. The range is in the Anza-Borrego desert, west of Salton Sea, north of Borrego Springs, California. The Field Clark's Dry Lake was supported and used by Naval Auxiliary Air Station Salton Sea 27 miles away. The airfield was on the western side of Clark's Dry Lake. The airfield was mostly used as an Emergency Landing strip. The bombing target range was northeast of the runways. When in use the ground staff had a radio communication station to talk the aircraft. In addition to bombing training, the base had gunnery and rocketry targets for training. The main runway was 7,500-feet, the other 5,000-feet, and both not usable when wet.

Clark Lake Radio Observatory (CLRO) was a deep-space radio astronomy observatory center with a large radio telescope array that opened in 1959 by the University of Maryland. This large array had 720 antennas that were 26 feet tall, they were lined up across the desert two miles long and one mile wide. The site was picked in 1958 as the lake is very flat, remote, and shielded by mountain ranges. The Observatory closed in 1986. One runway was used to support the Observatory, the runway was abandoned in the 1990s and is now gone. The site is now part of Anza-Borrego Desert State Park.

== See also ==
- California during World War II
- American Theater (1939–1945)
- United States home front during World War II
