= Naval Auxiliary Air Station Salton Sea =

Coordinates: 33°11′36″N 115°50′01″W

Naval Auxiliary Air Station Salton Sea was a United States Navy military facility located eight miles south of Salton City, California on the west shore of the Salton Sea.

== History ==
It was an auxiliary field to Naval Air Station San Diego commissioned in 1942, and had a barracks for over 600 men constructed there. It was disestablished in 1946. Naval Air Facility El Centro then took over the facility using it for parachute tests of the crewed space program and other military systems until 1979. There remains little if anything of the former field. The Salton Sea has taken over much of the runway.

In 2001 the United States Bureau of Reclamation used the site to remove salt from the Salton Sea, as high salinity is a major problem facing the inland lake. They used modified snowmaking equipment and mine waste removal vehicles and continued testing for a year; however high energy costs and air quality issues forced the termination of this project.

After closure, it was acquired by the Bureau of Land Management. The site is closed to all uses by the BLM as the Salton Sea Hazardous Area of Critical Environmental Concern.

Naval Auxiliary Air Station Salton Sea supported Naval Outlying Field Clark's Dry Lake, 27 miles away.

== See also ==
- California during World War II
