= Anza-Borrego Desert State Park =

State park in California, United States

- IUCN category III (natural monument or feature)
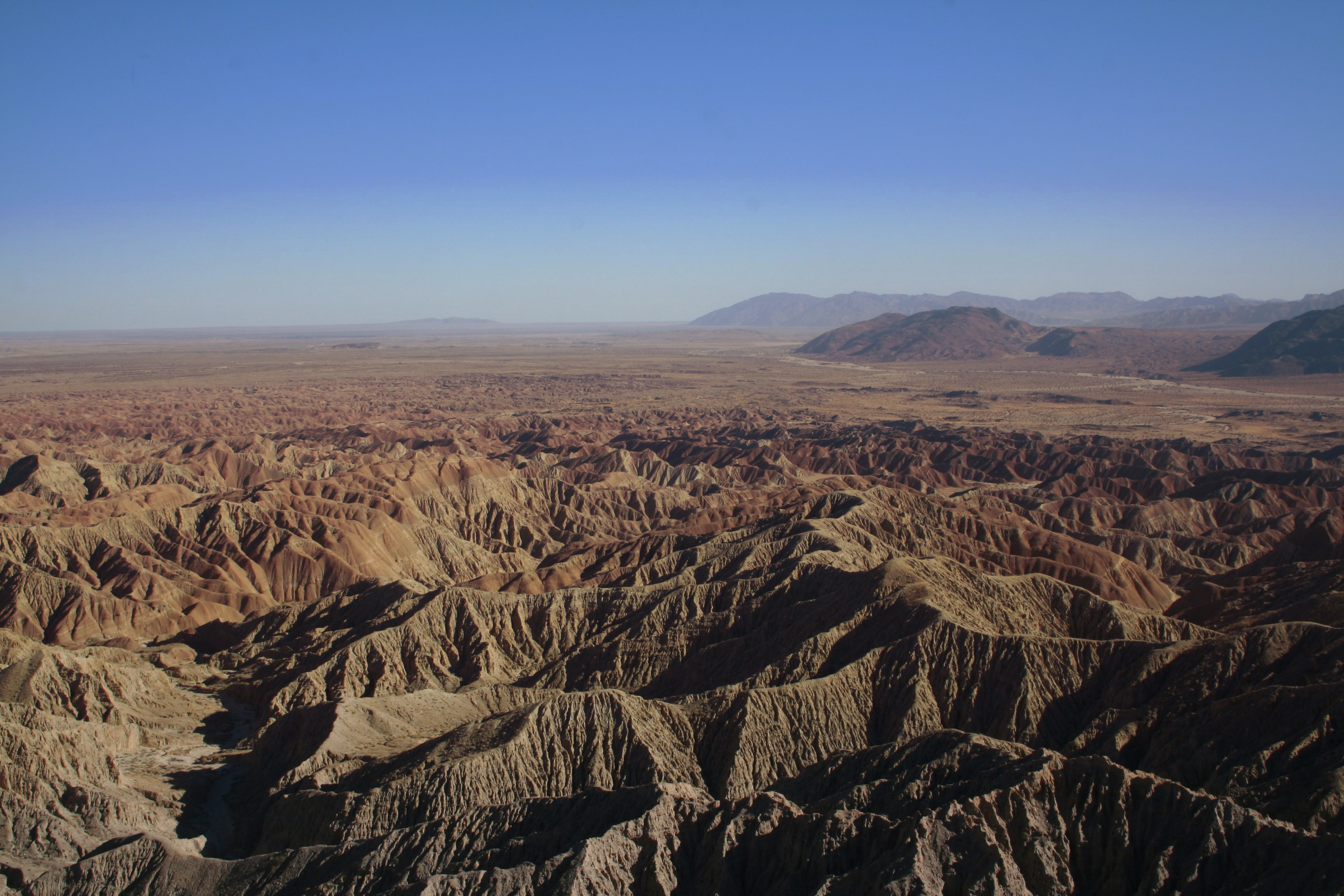
- Desert view from Font's Point

- Location within southern California Location within California Location within the United States
- Interactive map of Anza-Borrego Desert State Park
- Location: San Diego, Imperial, and Riverside counties, California, US
- Nearest city: Borrego Springs and Julian, California
- Coordinates: 33°15′33″N 116°23′57″W
- Area: 650,000 acres (2,600 km^{2})
- Established: 1932
- Governing body: California Department of Parks and Recreation

U.S. National Natural Landmark
- Designated: 1974

Anza-Borrego Desert State Park (/ˈænzə bəˈreɪɡoʊ/, AN-zə bə-RAY-goh) is a California State Park located within the Colorado Desert of Southern California, United States. Created in 1932, the park takes its name from 18th century Spanish explorer Juan Bautista de Anza and borrego, a Spanish word for sheep. With 650,000 acres (260,000 ha) that includes one-fifth of San Diego County, it is the largest state park in California and the third largest state park nationally.

The park occupies eastern San Diego County and reaches into Imperial and Riverside counties, enveloping two communities: Borrego Springs, which is home to the park's headquarters, and Shelter Valley.

== Geography ==
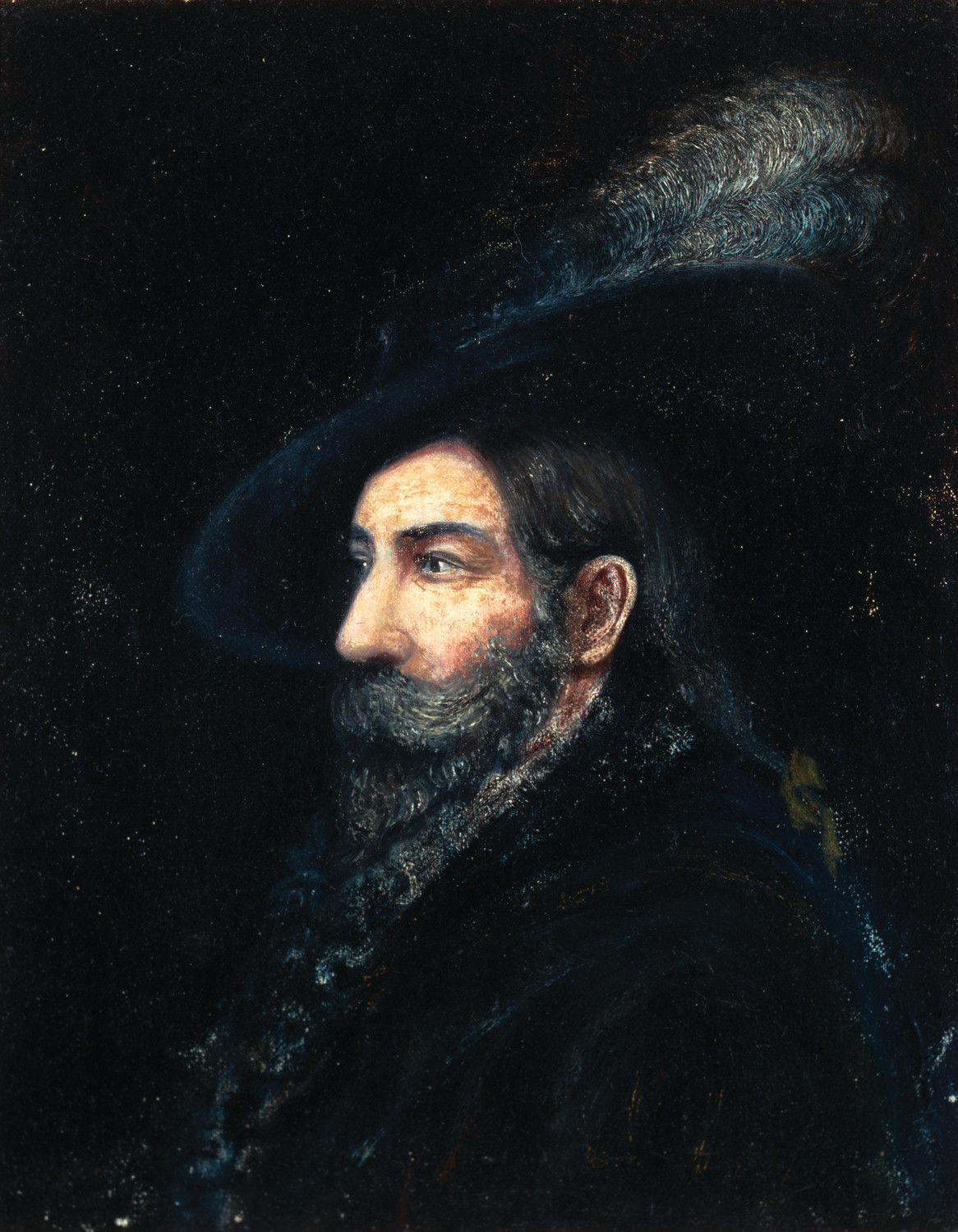
Juan Bautista de Anza, Spanish expeditionary and namesake of the park

The park is an anchor in the Mojave and Colorado Deserts Biosphere Reserve, and adjacent to the Santa Rosa and San Jacinto Mountains National Monument.

The great bowl of the surrounding desert is surrounded by mountains, with the Vallecito Mountains to the south and the highest Santa Rosa Mountains to the north which are in the wilderness area, without paved roads and with the only year-round creeks.

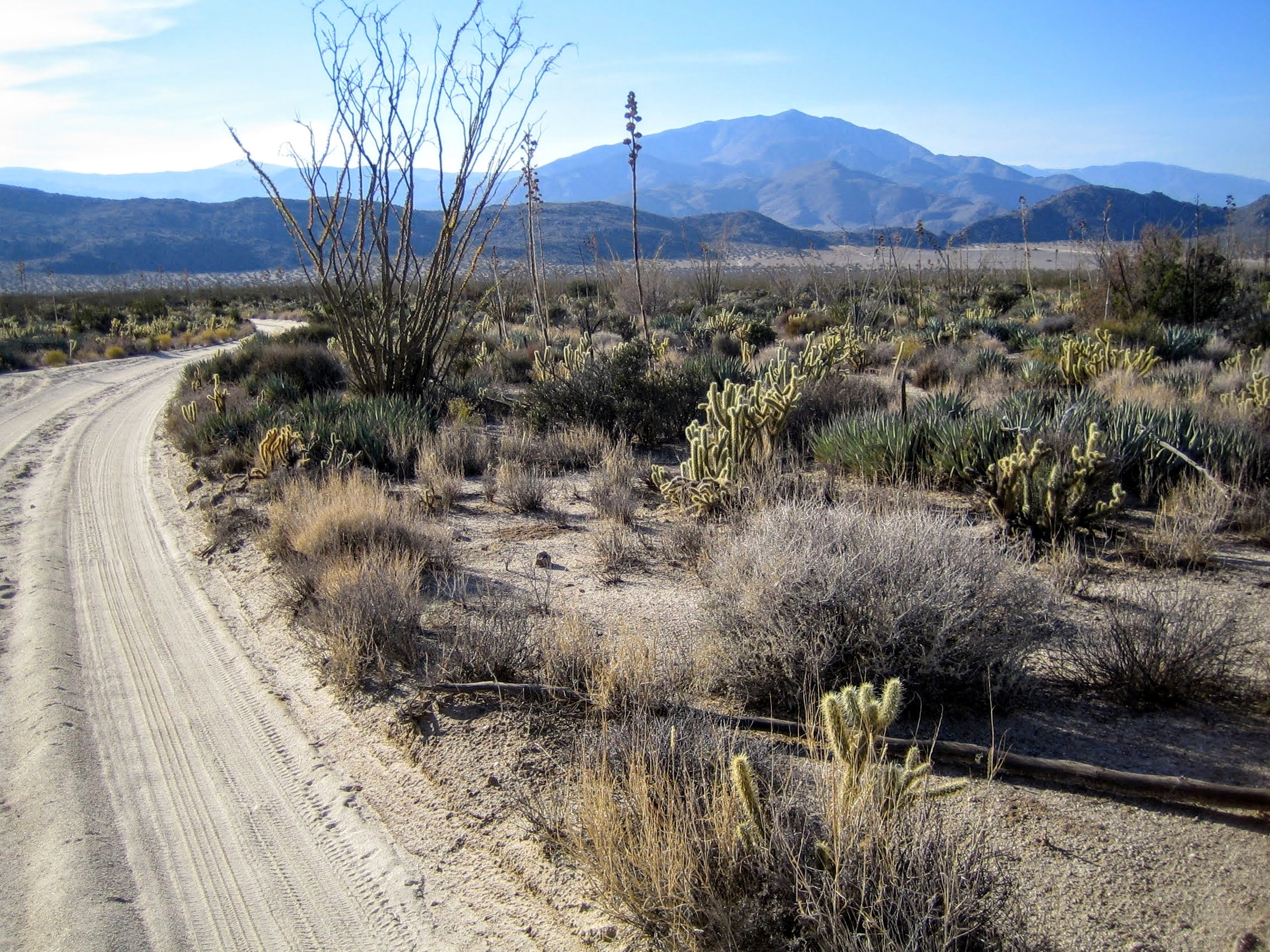
Blair Valley

Blair Valley is a valley in the State Park. It consists of the main Blair Valley and Little Blair Valley separated by a small mountain range over which Foot and Walker Pass leads. To the west of the valley lies Granite Mountain, to the east the range of Vallecito Mountains.

The valley can be crossed by dirt roads, e.g., to reach a look-out point over Smuggler Canyon or sites of Indian pre-Hispanic art.

Borrego Palm Canyon is the site of park headquarters and has "the most famous view point in the park, overlooking barren, spectacularly eroded Borrego Badlands". Tamarisk Grove hosts a campground and is close to Yaqui Well, a "historic watering spot...with magnificent desert ironwood trees and a busy wildlife population".

== Visiting ==
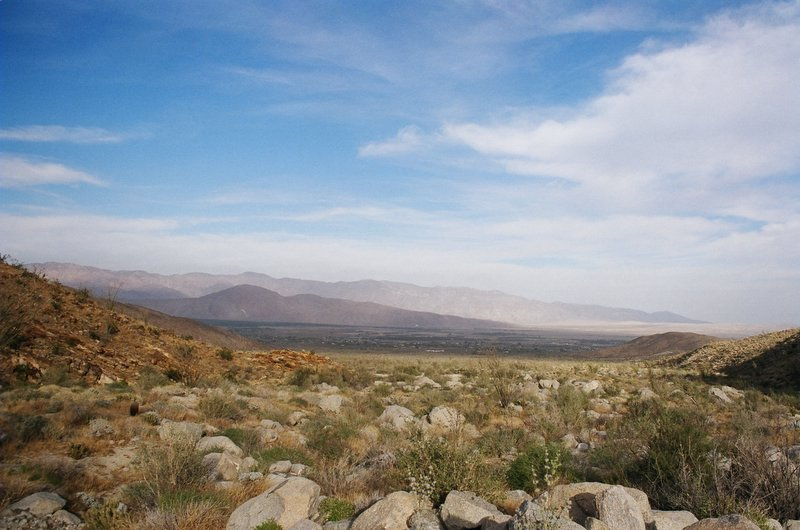
Vista of the Anza-Borrego desert landscape

Anza-Borrego is often pictured as a wrinkled wasteland of harshly eroded, nearly barren clay and gravel, possibly because its gullied badlands are its most eroded phenomenon. There is more to it than that: cool piney heights, springs and oozing ciénegas, spectacular although brief waves of wild flowers in spring, and native fragrances of pervasive sage, subtle cottonwood, and even more subtle earth.

— Sunset Travel Guide to Southern California (1974)

The park has 500 mi (800 km) of dirt roads, 12 designated wilderness areas, and 110 mi (180 km) of hiking trails. Anza-Borrego Desert State Park has four developed campgrounds and eight primitive campgrounds for overnight camping. Park information and maps are available in the visitor center. The park has Wi-Fi access.

The park is approximately a two-hour drive northeast from San Diego, southeast from Riverside or Irvine, and south from Palm Springs. Access on the east-Coachella Valley side is via County Route S22 and State Route 78. Access on the west-Pacific Ocean side is via California County Route S2 and State Route 78. SR-79 provides access through the high and forested Laguna Mountains, such as in Cuyamaca Rancho State Park. These highways climb from the coast to 2,400 ft (730 m) above sea level, then descend 2,000 ft (610 m) down into the Borrego Valley in the center of the park. Access from the south is via the southern portion of S2.

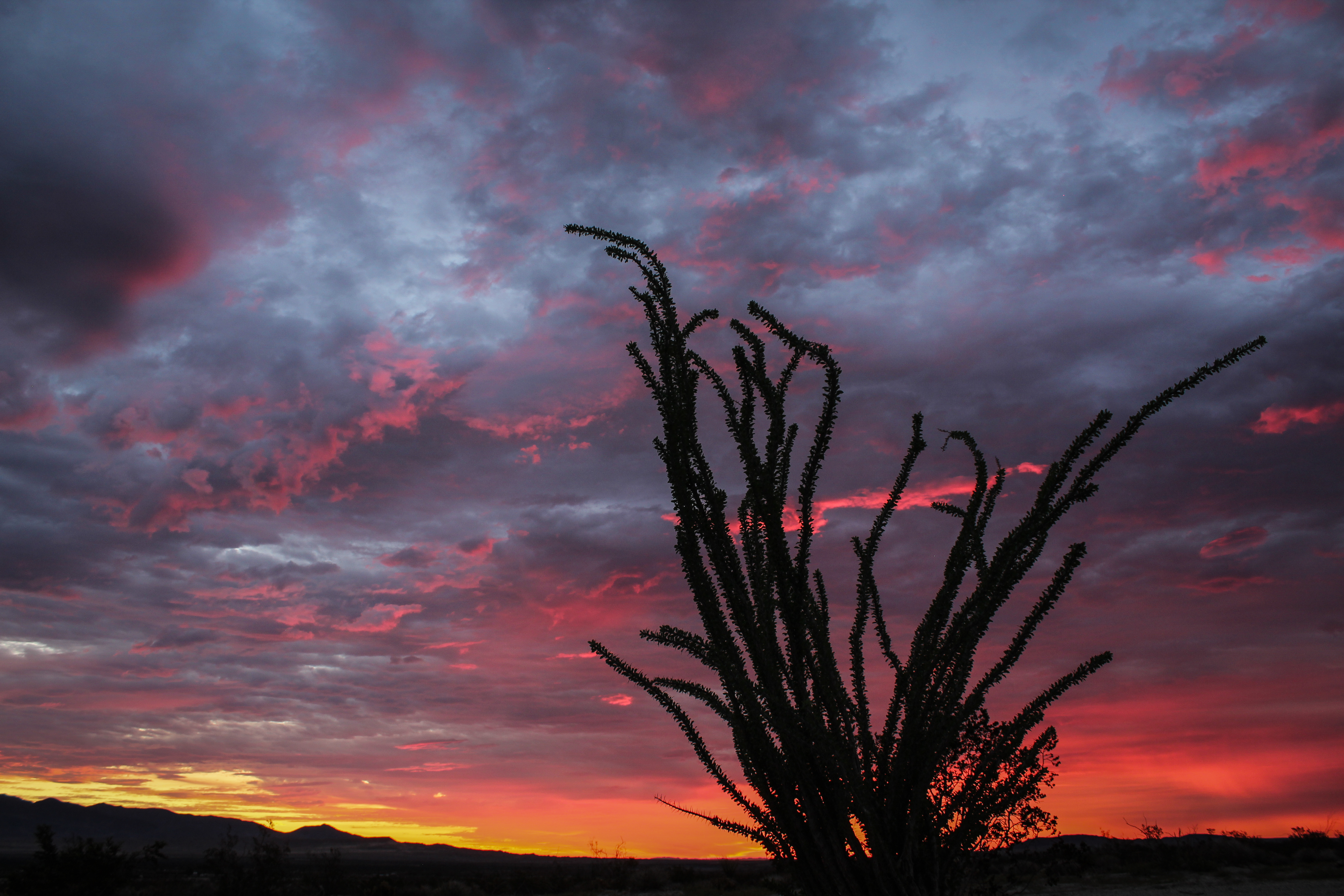
A large ocotillo silhouetted against a blazing sunrise in Anza-Borrego Desert State Park.

A popular site to hike to near the visitor center is Hellhole Palms, a grove of California fan palms in Hellhole Canyon near Maidenhair Falls. The park also provides access points to the Pacific Crest Trail and the Juan Bautista de Anza National Historic Trail.

Stargazing is another activity at Anza-Borrego. The park was designated an International Dark Sky Park by the International Dark-Sky Association in 2018.

Ecotourism is big for Anza-Borrego. On average, the population of Borrego Springs increases by about 580% in peak wildflower superbloom season. This is a shift from around 3400 long-term residents to around 200,000 tourists.

== Flora and fauna ==
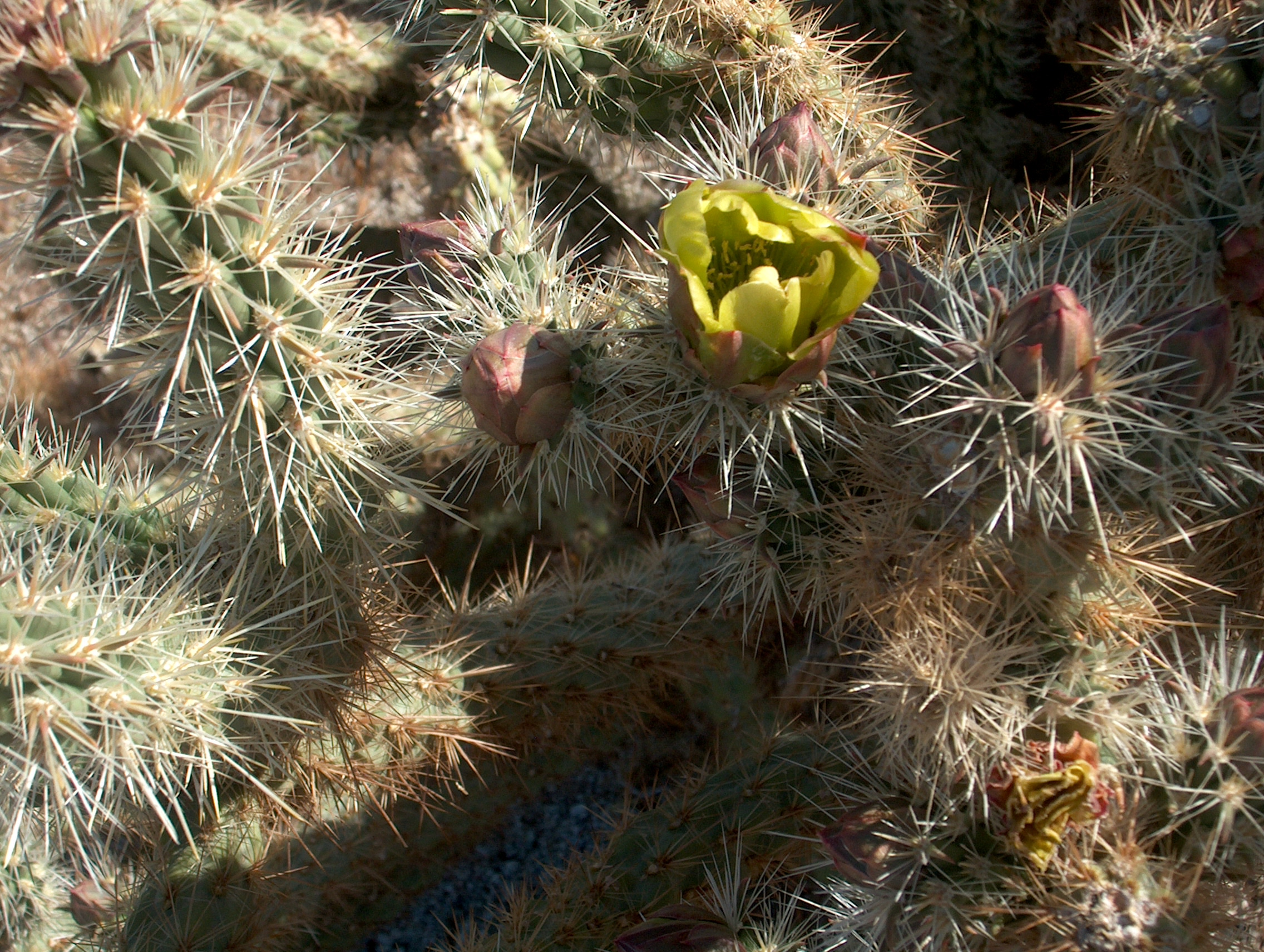
Cactus in bloom

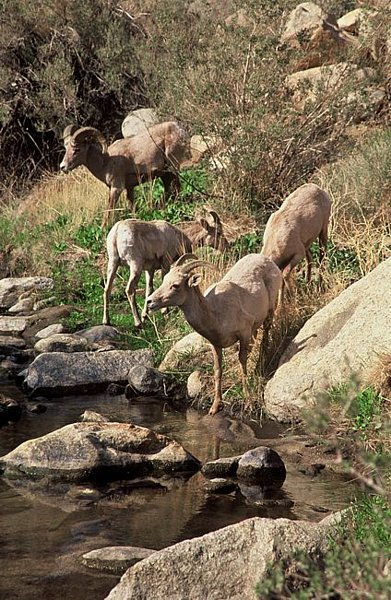
Desert bighorn sheep at Palm Canyon Oasis

The park has about 600 species of native plants. The habitats are primarily within the Colorado Desert portion of the Sonoran Desert ecoregion. The higher extreme northern and eastern sections in the Peninsular Ranges are in the California montane chaparral and woodlands ecoregion, characterized by closed-cone pine forests, manzanitas and oak woodlands.

The park contains mountains, large arid landscapes and rock formations, colorful badlands, bajadas, and arroyos such as the Alma Wash. The bajadas contain creosote bush-bur sage with creosote bush (Larrea tridentata) and the palo verde-cactus shrub ecosystems with the palo verde tree (Parkinsonia microphylla), cacti, and ocotillo. In the washes, Colorado/Sonoran microphylla woodlands can be found. These woodlands include such plants as smoke tree (Psorothamnus spinosus), velvet mesquite (Prosopis velutina), and catclaw (Acacia greggii).

The park has natural springs and oases, with the state's only native palm, the California fan palm. Seasonal wildflower displays can be seen in many plant community association throughout the park. Superblooms, one of the biggest Anza-Borrego State Park attractions, are indispensable indicators of the increasingly severe implications of climate change, precipitation levels, and shifting seasonal starting and ending periods. Superblooms are fundamental healthy and natural aspects to this desert, as it boosts the local economy with the influx of tourism and is vital player in the desert biome.

A very small population of elephant trees (Bursera microphylla) can be found in the park, specifically in the Fish Creek Badlands, in a location between the Vallecito Mountains and Ocotillo Wells. This population represents the northernmost extent of the distribution of this species.

The oases are prolific with many types of fauna, especially for bird-watching. Throughout the park, visitors may see bighorn sheep, mountain lions, badgers, kit foxes, mule deer, coyotes, greater roadrunners, golden eagles, black-tailed jackrabbits, ground squirrels, kangaroo rats, deer mouse, quail, and prairie falcons. In the reptile class, desert iguanas, chuckwallas, and the red diamond rattlesnakes can be seen.

Anza-Borrego Desert State Park is home to multiple endangered species. Unfortunately, the building of roads and highways have a severe effect upon these species and roadkills are cause for serious concern. Roads not only contribute to habitat fragmentation which starkly divides ecosystems, but led to 18 roadkillings within just 5 days in a recent study done in 2018.

=== Bighorn sheep ===
Some areas are habitats for the desert bighorn sheep. The peninsula bighorn sheep reside in Anza-Borrego. They have been federally endangered since 1998 and are one of the most iconic species of this state park. Observers count this endangered species to study the population, and monitor its current decline from human encroachment. The two biggest threats to bighorn sheep populations are anthropogenic influences and climate change. As humans continue to develop in Anza-Borrego Desert State Park and the surrounding area, bighorn sheep continue to lose their habitat. Coupled with the increasing extreme temperatures and decrease in precipitation, bighorn shape face a decreasing free-standing water availability crisis. Bighorn sheep face considerable habitat loss at the hands of humans ranging from water diversion to noise pollution and habitat fragmentation. As critical members of this desert biome, it is important to recognize the necessity to protect them and mitigate our impact on their limited and unique environment.

== Climate and its impact on the landscape ==
Anza-Borrego State Park is located in the Colorado Desert Region of Southern California which is an extension of the Mexican Sonoran Desert. The Koppen Climate classification for Anza Borrego Desert State Park is BWh. The characteristics of this climate are typically hot and arid along with a deficiency in precipitation due to the continental tropical air mass which has very dry warm air. As climate change increases there is potential for wetter years which bring about "super blooms", that boost tourism during the winter and early spring. Locals began to rely on seasonal tourism to boost their economies, and, along with wet years climate change has threatened the economy as it has the ability to produce longer droughts which threaten the tourist dependent towns nearby. As the environment changes with climate desertification, locals and developers search for ways to maintain tourism, some attempt to maintain steady tourism with mega development of resorts or artificial oases. However, a study conducted on North-West China deserts in 2020 showed that artificial oases vegetation is not acclimated to drought conditions, and they consume large amounts of groundwater which deplete the water table level and outcompete native vegetation that store water in their roots. Since deserts have such extreme weather, the species that inhabit them are highly dependent on each other, and developing on deserts or creating artificial oases will not only impact vegetation but also animals.

Climate data for Borrego Desert Park, CA
Month	Jan	Feb	Mar	Apr	May	Jun	Jul	Aug	Sep	Oct	Nov	Dec	Year
Record high °F (°C)	90 (32)	95 (35)	101 (38)	111 (44)	114 (46)	122 (50)	121 (49)	120 (49)	117 (47)	113 (45)	98 (37)	87 (31)	122 (50)
Mean daily maximum °F (°C)	69.3 (20.7)	72.3 (22.4)	77.9 (25.5)	84.5 (29.2)	93.2 (34.0)	102.7 (39.3)	107.4 (41.9)	106.1 (41.2)	101.0 (38.3)	89.7 (32.1)	77.9 (25.5)	68.9 (20.5)	87.6 (30.9)
Mean daily minimum °F (°C)	44.0 (6.7)	46.5 (8.1)	50.0 (10.0)	53.8 (12.1)	60.7 (15.9)	68.4 (20.2)	75.8 (24.3)	75.5 (24.2)	70.3 (21.3)	60.6 (15.9)	50.4 (10.2)	43.4 (6.3)	58.3 (14.6)
Record low °F (°C)	20 (−7)	24 (−4)	28 (−2)	28 (−2)	34 (1)	45 (7)	56 (13)	55 (13)	49 (9)	33 (1)	31 (−1)	23 (−5)	20 (−7)
Average precipitation inches (mm)	1.11 (28)	1.08 (27)	0.70 (18)	0.23 (5.8)	0.06 (1.5)	0.02 (0.51)	0.28 (7.1)	0.51 (13)	0.30 (7.6)	0.30 (7.6)	0.45 (11)	0.80 (20)	5.84 (147.11)
Average snowfall inches (cm)	0 (0)	0 (0)	0 (0)	0 (0)	0 (0)	0 (0)	0 (0)	0 (0)	0 (0)	0 (0)	0 (0)	0.1 (0.25)	0.1 (0.25)
Source: http://www.wrcc.dri.edu/cgi-bin/cliMAIN.pl?ca0983

== Geology and paleontology ==
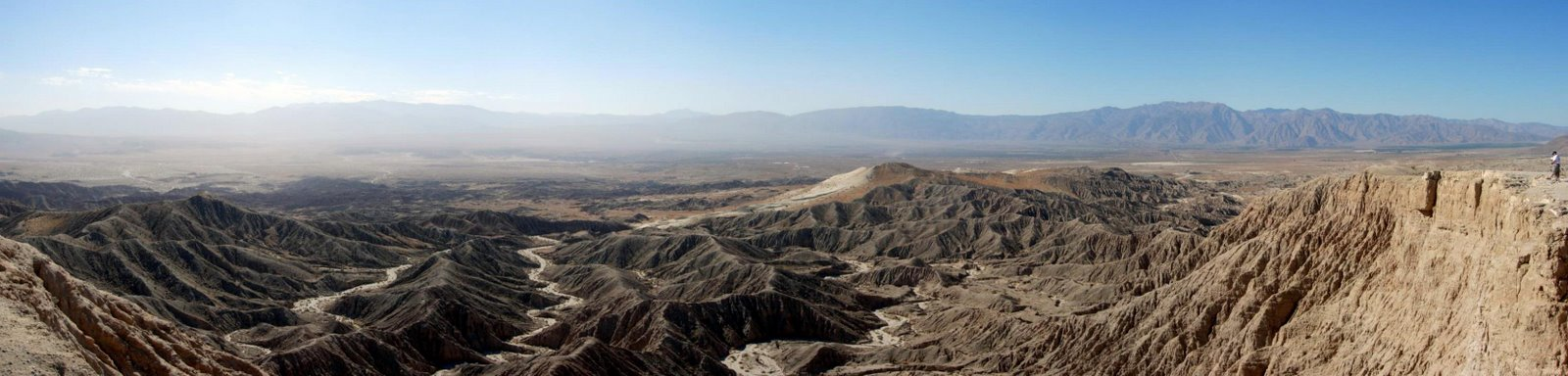
Panoramic view from Font's Point westward over Borrego Valley to the Laguna Mountains

The expanses of Anza-Borrego Desert State Park's eroded badlands also provide a different view into the region's long-vanished tropical past. The inland of southeastern California was not always a desert. Paleontology, the study of the fossilized remains of ancient life, is the key to understanding this prehistoric world. The park has an exceptional fossil record which includes preserved plants, a variety of invertebrate shells, animal tracks, and an array of bones and teeth. Most fossils found in the park date from six million to under a half million years in age (the Pliocene and Pleistocene epochs), or about 60 million years after the last dinosaur age ended.

=== Geology ===
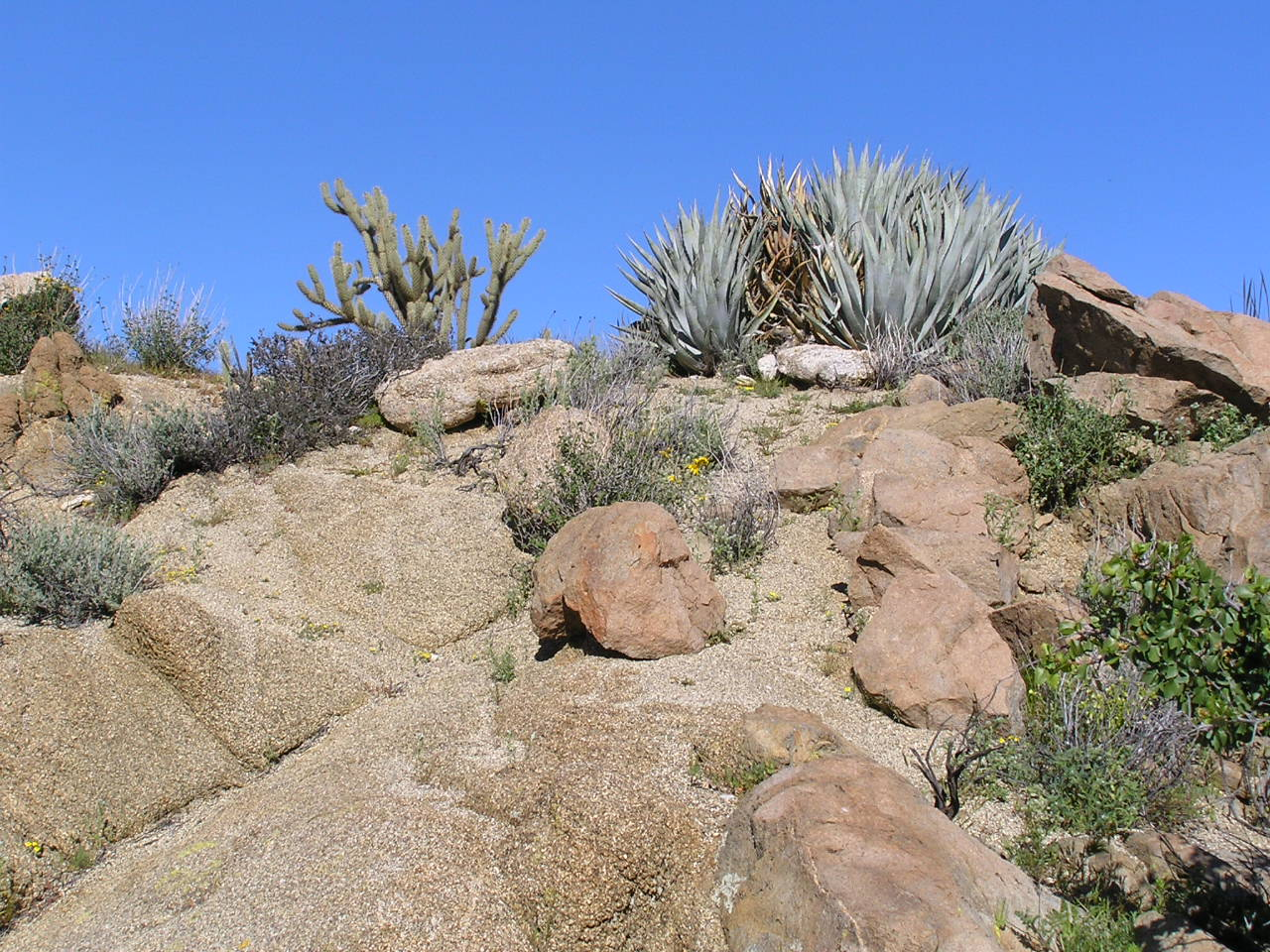
Anza-Borrego rock outcrop and flora

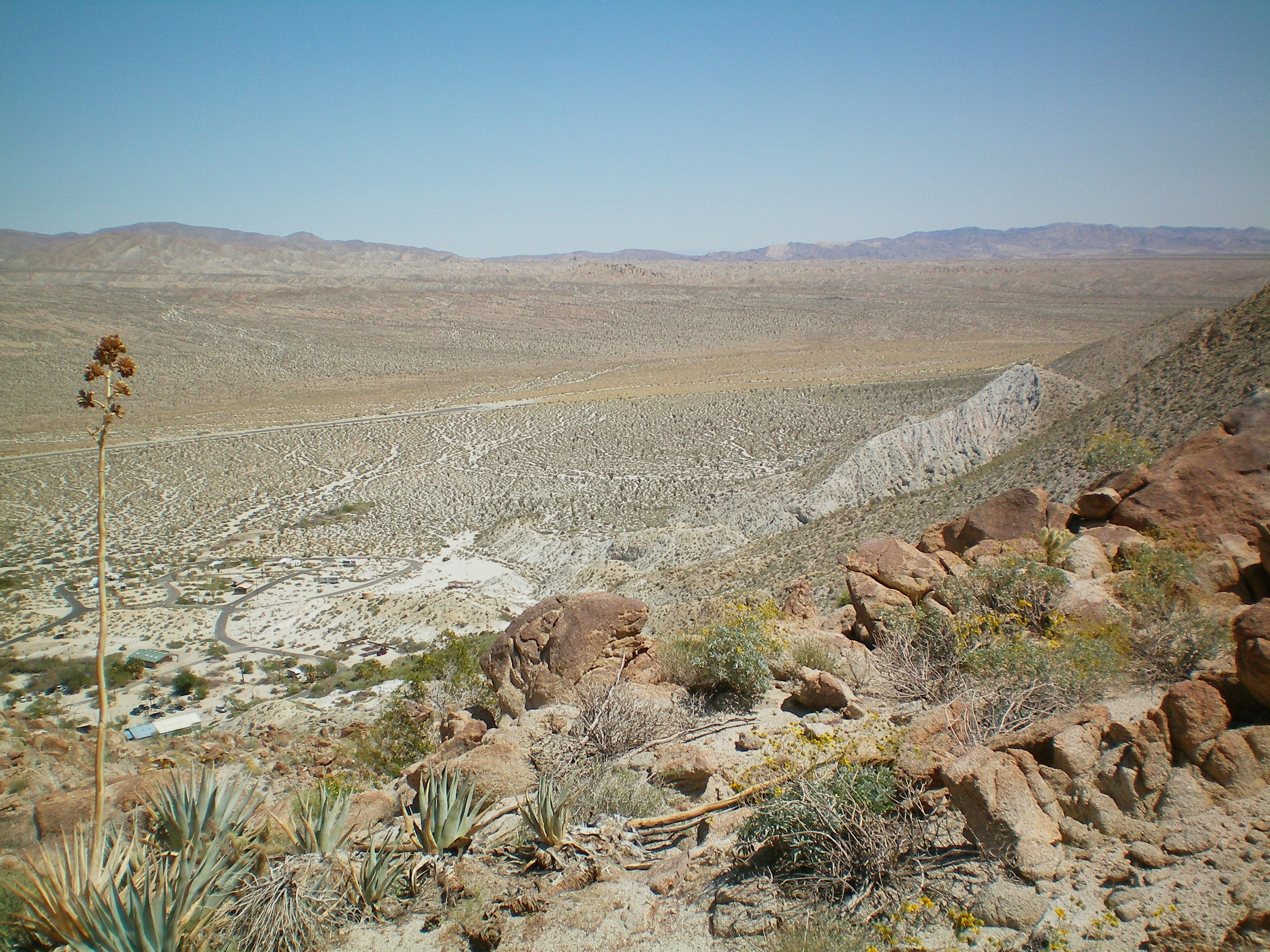
Agua Caliente Springs and valley towards south

Anza-Borrego Desert State Park lies in a unique geologic setting along the western margin of the Salton Trough. This major topographic depression with the Salton Sink having elevations of 200 ft (61 m) below sea level, forms the northernmost end of an active rift valley and a geological continental plate boundary. The trough extends north from the Gulf of California to San Gorgonio Pass, and from the eastern rim of the Peninsular Ranges eastward to the San Andreas Fault zone along the far side of the Coachella Valley.

Over the past seven million years, a relatively complete geologic record of over 20,000 ft (6,100 m) of fossil-bearing sediment has been deposited within the park along the rift valley's western margin. Paleontological remains are widespread and diverse, and are found scattered over hundreds of square miles of eroded badlands terrain extending south from the Santa Rosa Mountains into northern Baja California in Mexico.

Both marine and terrestrial environments are represented by this long and rich fossil record. Six million years ago, the ancestral Gulf of California filled the Salton Trough, extending northward past what would become the city of Palm Springs. These tropical waters supported a profusion of both large and small marine organisms. Through time, the sea gave way as an immense volume of sediment eroded during the formation of the Grand Canyon spilled into the Salton Trough. Little by little, the ancestral Colorado River built a massive river delta across the seaway. Fossil hardwoods from the deltaic sands and associated coastal plain deposits suggest the region received three times as much rainfall as now.

The Anza-Borrego region gradually changed from a predominantly marine environment into a system of interrelated terrestrial habitats. North of the Colorado River Delta and intermittently fed by the river, a sequence of lakes and dry lakes has persisted for over three million years. At the same time, sediments eroded from the growing Santa Rosa Mountains and the other Peninsular Ranges to spread east into the trough. These sediments provide an almost unbroken terrestrial fossil record, ending only a half million years ago. Here, the deposits of ancient streams and rivers trapped the remains of wildlife that inhabited a vast brushland savannah laced with riparian woodlands.

=== Fossils ===
This record of changing environments and habitats includes over 550 types of fossil plants and animals, ranging from the preserved microscopic plant pollen and algal spores to baleen whale bones and mammoth skeletons. Many of the species are extinct and some are known only from fossil remains recovered from this park. Combined with a long and complete sedimentary depositional sequence, these diverse fossil assemblages are a paleontological resource of international importance.

Both the Pliocene-Pleistocene epoch boundary and the Blancan-Irvingtonian North American land mammal ages boundary fall within the long geological record from the Anza-Borrego region. Environmental changes associated with these geological time divisions are probably better tracked by fossils from the Anza-Borrego region than in any other North American continental platform stratum. These changes herald the beginning of the Ice Ages, and the strata contain fossil clues to the origin and development of modern southwestern desert landscapes.

The first fossils, marine shells from the ancient Gulf of California and freshwater shells from a prehistoric era Lake Cahuilla, the precursor of present-day Salton Sea, were collected and described by William Blake in 1853. Blake was the geologist and mineralogist for the Pacific Railroad Surveys commissioned by Congress and President Franklin Pierce to find a railway route to the Pacific. Blake first named this region the Colorado Desert.

=== Marine period ===
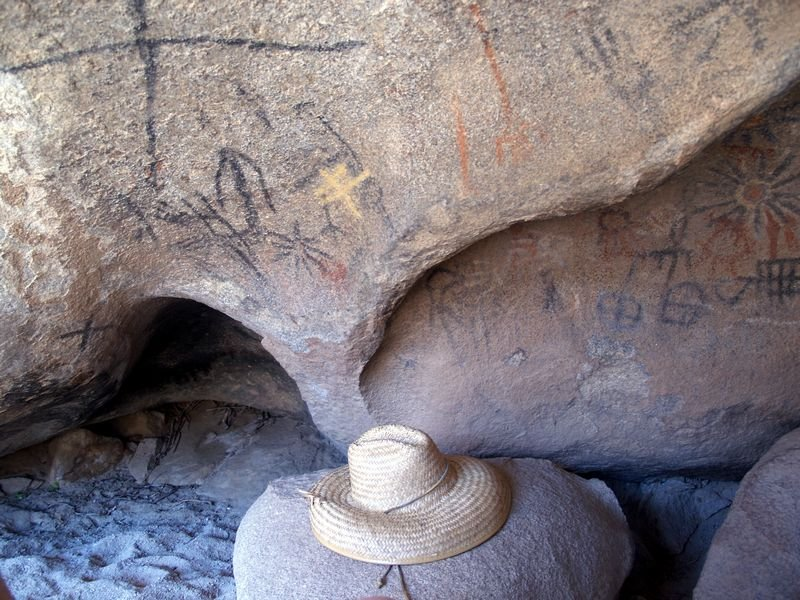
Pre-Columbian era rock art in the Indian Hill archeological area

Since the late 19th century, numerous scientific studies and published papers have centered on the marine organisms that inhabited the ancient Gulf of California. Fossil assemblages from the classic Imperial Formation include calcareous nanoplankton and dinoflagellates, foraminifera, corals, polychaetes, clams, gastropods, sea urchins, sand dollars, and crabs and shrimp. The deposits also yield the remains of marine vertebrates, such as sharks and rays, bony fish, baleen whales, walruses and dugongs.

Marine environments such as an outer and inner shelf, platform reef, nearshore beach, and lagoon, are all represented within the Imperial Formation. As the sea became more shallow, estuarine and brackish marine conditions prevailed, typified by thick channel deposits of oyster and pecten shell coquina that now form the "Elephant Knees" along Fish Creek. Many of the marine fossils are closely related to forms from the Caribbean Sea. They document a time before the Isthmus of Panama formed when the warm Gulf Stream of the western Atlantic Ocean invaded eastern Pacific Ocean waters.

=== Terrestrial period ===
As North and South America connected about three million years ago, terrestrial faunal north–south migrations began on a continental scale called the Great American Interchange, and are present in Anza-Borrego's fossils. Animals such as giant ground sloths and porcupines made their first appearance in North America at this time.

The oldest terrestrial vertebrate fossils from the Colorado Desert predate the late Miocene invasion of the Gulf of California. These very rare fossils include a gomphothere (elephant-like mammal), rodent, felid and small camelid, and were collected from 10– to 12-million-year-old riverine and near-shore lake deposits. However, the most significant and abundant vertebrate fossils have been recovered from the latest Miocene through late-Pleistocene riverine and flood plain deposits of the Palm Spring Formation in the Vallecito and Fish Creek Badlands and Ocotillo Conglomerate exposed in the Borrego Badlands. These fossil assemblages occur in a 3.5-million-year-long, uninterrupted stratigraphic sequence that has been dated using horizons of volcanic ash and paleomagnetic methods.

The bestiary for this savannah landscape includes some of the most unusual creatures to inhabit North America –animals such as:
Geochelone, a giant bathtub-sized tortoise; Aiolornis incredibilis, the largest flying bird of the Northern Hemisphere, with 17-ft (5.2-m) wing span; Paramylodon, Megalonyx and Nothrotheriops, giant ground sloths, some with bony armor within their skin; Pewelagus, a very small rabbit; Borophagus, a hyena-like dog; Arctodus, a giant short-faced bear; Smilodon, a saber-toothed cat; Miracinonyx, the North American cheetah; Mammuthus imperator, the largest known mammoth; Tapirus, an extinct tapir; Equus enormis and Equus scotti, two species of extinct Pleistocene horses; Gigantocamelus a giant camel; and Capromeryx minor, the dwarf pronghorn. Within the state park, Mammuthus remains, including two complete skulls and a partial skeleton, have been uncovered at 46 different archeological sites. Most of these sites are located in the Borrego Badlands. Gompotherium, Stegomastodon, Mammuthus meridionalis, and Mammuthus columbi are among the various mammoth fossils to be found in Anza-Borrego Desert State Park. A Gompotherium jaw is on display at the University of California Museum of Paleontology, Berkeley.

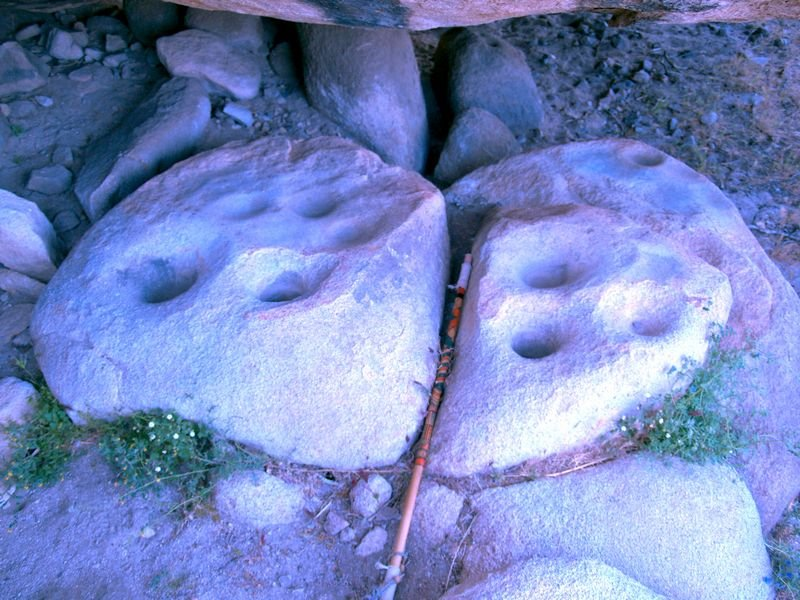
Morteros, bedrock mortar grinding holes, in the Indian Hill area

== Native Americans ==
The Native Americans of the surrounding mountains and deserts include the Cahuilla, Cupeño, and Kumeyaay (Diegueño) Native American tribes. It was the homeland of these peoples for thousands of years, and their artists created petroglyph and pictogram rock art expressing their cultures. Common foods of their diets included the Agave deserti, jumping cholla cactus, jackrabbit, bighorn sheep, and Indian rice grasses. Food-processing and harvesting was labor and time intensive. Roasting pits, bedrock milling and grinding features, cupule petroglyphs, and bedrock mortars all lead to this conclusion. Many artifacts have been found, such as obsidian, pumice, and fish bones, which tell us that these communities had extensive regionally internal trade networks. These were all observed at the CA-SDI-813, also known as the Mine Wash Site in Anza-Borrego Desert State Park.

== Park interpretive associations ==
The Anza-Borrego Foundation, founded in 1967, is a non-profit educational organization and is the sole cooperating association of the park. It manages all sales at the State Park Visitor Center and State Park Store.

The Anza-Borrego Institute, the education arm of the foundation, provides in-depth educational courses to more than 100,000 visitors each year. The institute offers in-depth field programs, a fifth-grade environmental camp, citizen science research, and Parks Online Resources for Teachers and Students. The foundation's mission is to protect and preserve the natural landscapes, wildlife habitat, and cultural heritage of the park for the benefit and enjoyment of present and future generations.

== Filming locations ==
Notable movies, among others, filmed in the park include:

- The climactic finale of Paul Thomas Anderson's One Battle After Another (2025) starring Leonardo DiCaprio and Sean Penn were filmed in the park.
- Last Days in the Desert (2014) starring Ewan McGregor as Jesus Christ was filmed in the park.
- Into the Wild (2007)
- The Island (2005)
- The Scorpion King (2002)
- The Salton Sea (2002)
- Bugsy (1991) starring Warren Beatty
- The Andromeda Strain (1971)

== Gallery ==
Flora and fauna of Anza-Borrego Desert Park

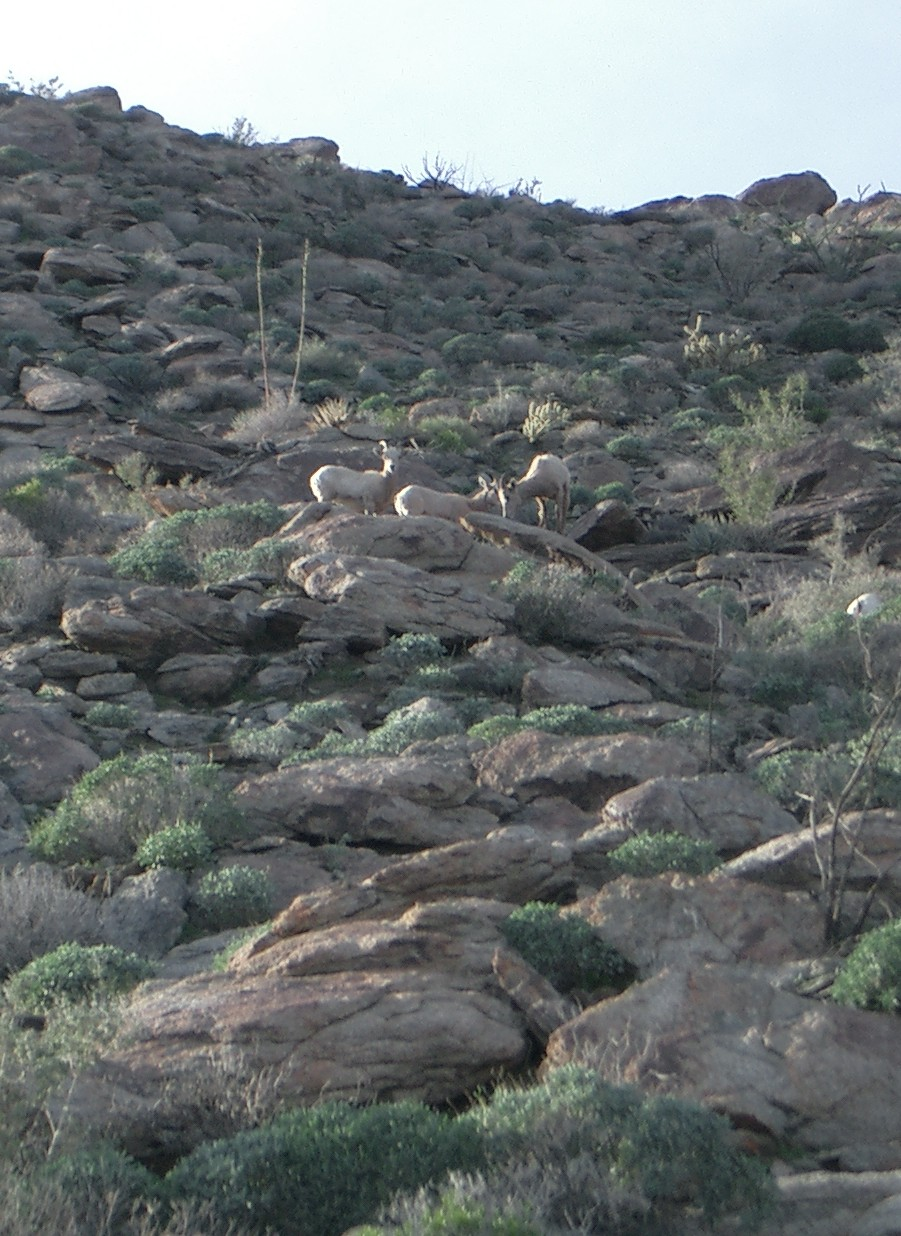
Peninsular bighorn sheep in Anza-Borrego Desert State Park

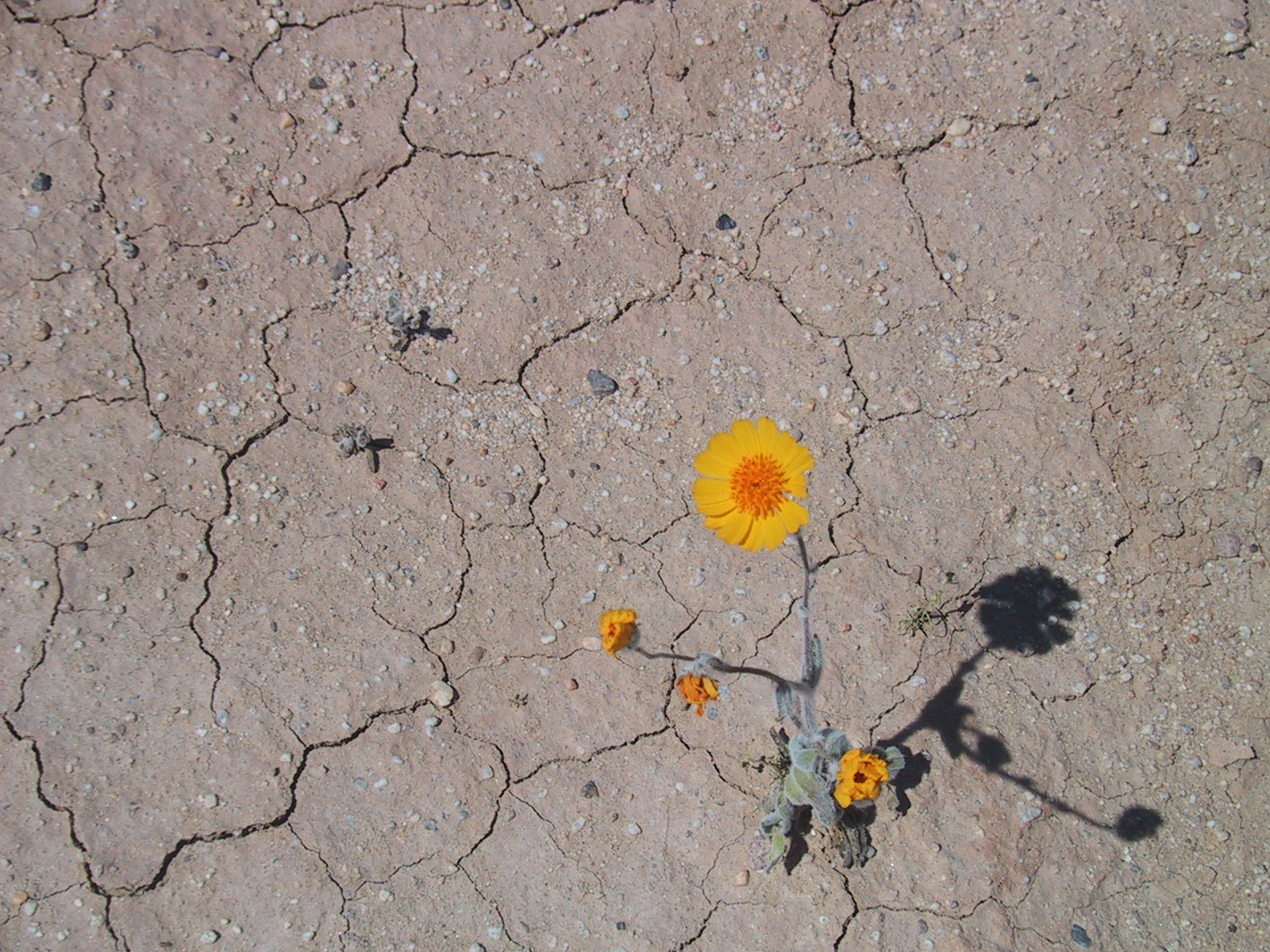
A desert marigold in bloom

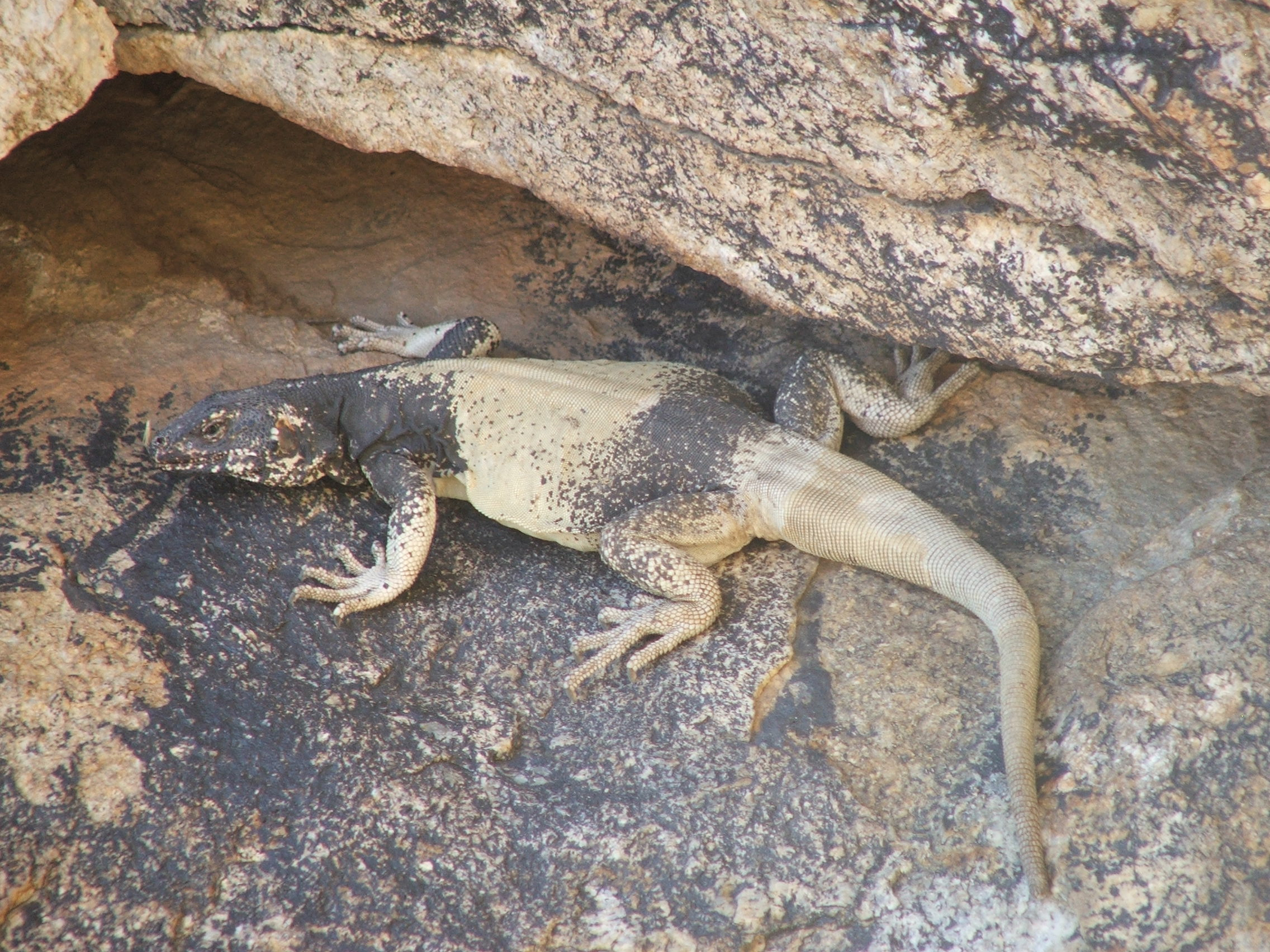
Common chuckwalla, Sauromalus ater in Palm Canyon, near Palm Springs

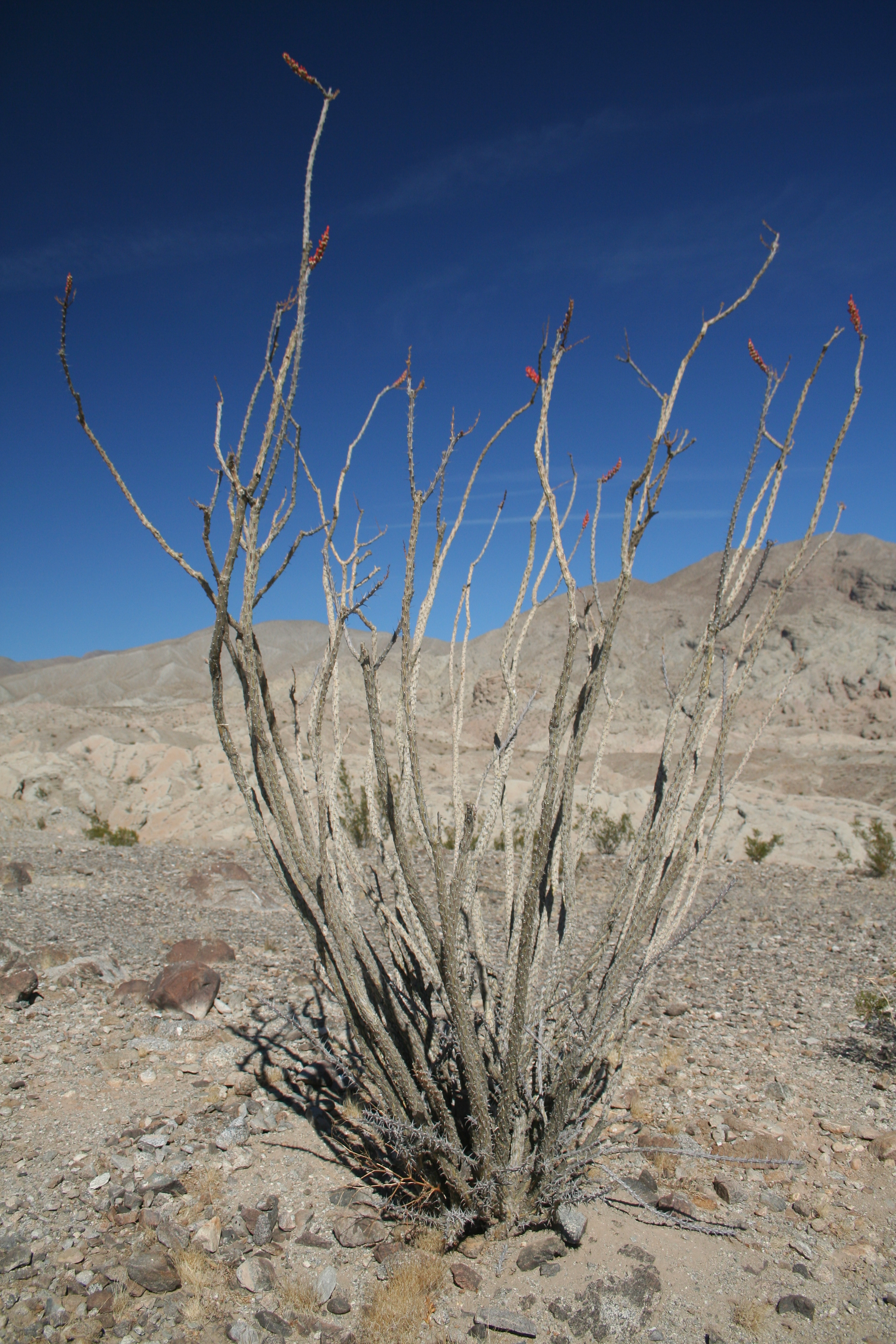
An ocotillo plant common in Anza-Borrego Desert State Park

Washingtonia filifera in Borrego Palm Canyon. Video clip

Cylindropuntia bigelovii. Video clip

Ferocactus cylindraceus. Video clip

== See also ==
- Mojave and Colorado Deserts Biosphere Reserve
  - Man and the Biosphere Programme
  - World Network of Biosphere Reserves in the United States
- Mud Caves
- Ocotillo Wells, California
- Shelter Valley, California
