= Casa de Machado y Silvas =

Historical Landmark in San Diego, California, United States

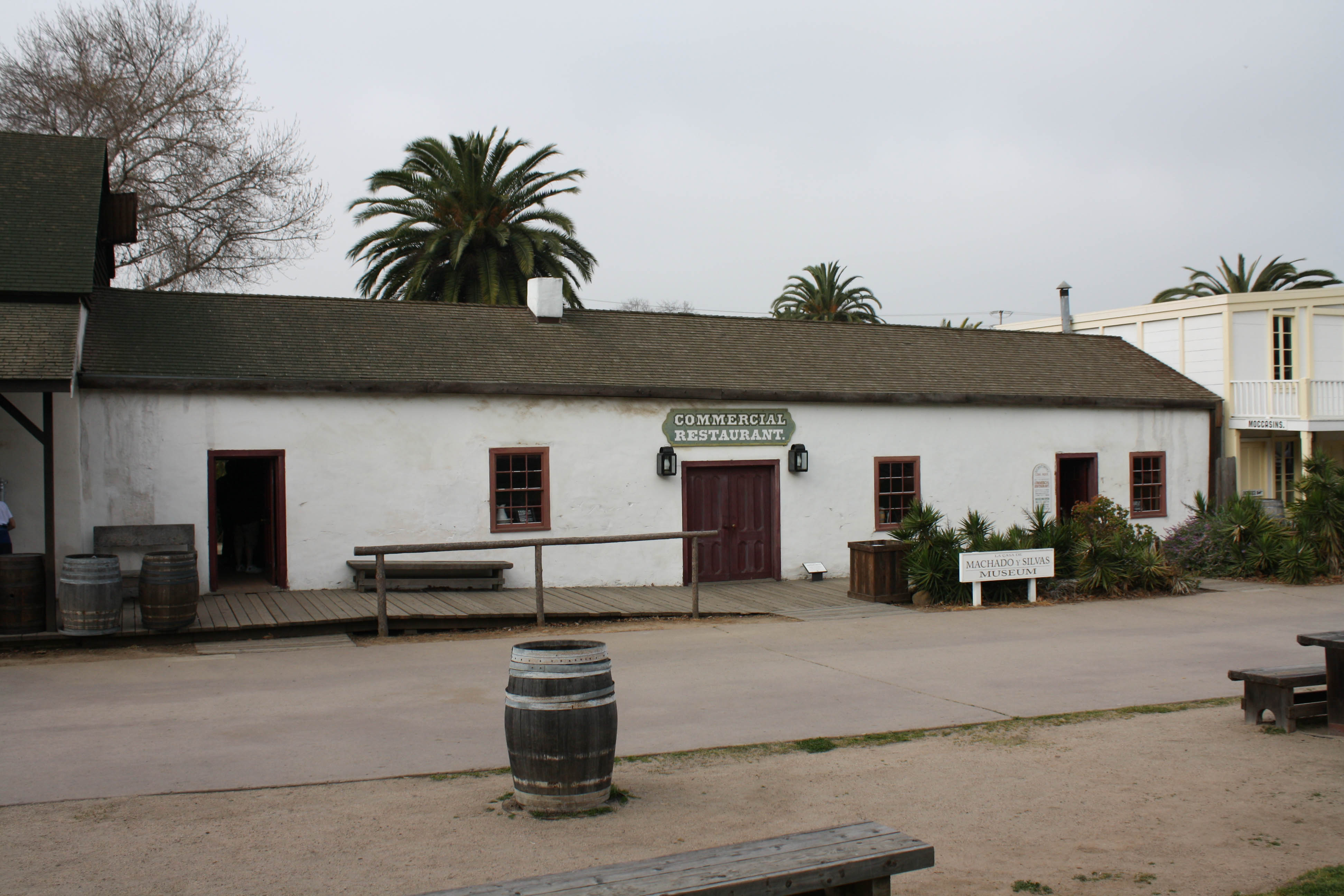
- Casa de Machado y Silvas

- Location within California Location within the United States
- 32.7543°N 117.1976°W
- Location: 2737 San Diego Avenue, San Diego, California

History
- Built: 1832

Site notes
- Architectural style: Adobe

California Historical Landmark
- Designated: December 6, 1932
- Reference no.: 71

Casa de Machado, also called Casa de Machado y Silvas, is a historical adobe building in San Diego, California, built in 1832. The Casa de Lopez site is a California Historical Landmark No. 71, listed on December 6, 1932. Casa de Machado was built by José Manuel Machado, a leatherjacket company soldier of the New Spain Army, stationed in San Diego. José Manuel Machado built a house, Casa de Stewart, for his daughter Rosa. Rosa married Jack Stewart, a pilot boat operator from Maine. The Stewarts eventually enlarged the house. Carmen Stewart Meza lived in the house for some years. In the 1850s it was a commercial restaurant. The Machado y Silvas family owned the house until the 1930s. In the 1930s and early 1940s, it was a rooming house, café, art studio, and souvenir shop. In 1942, the house became a church, Machado Memorial Chapel. Casa de Machado was acquired by California State Parks in 1968, who had it restored. The Casa de Machado y Silvas house's current address is 2737 San Diego Avenue in Old Town, San Diego.

== Gallery ==
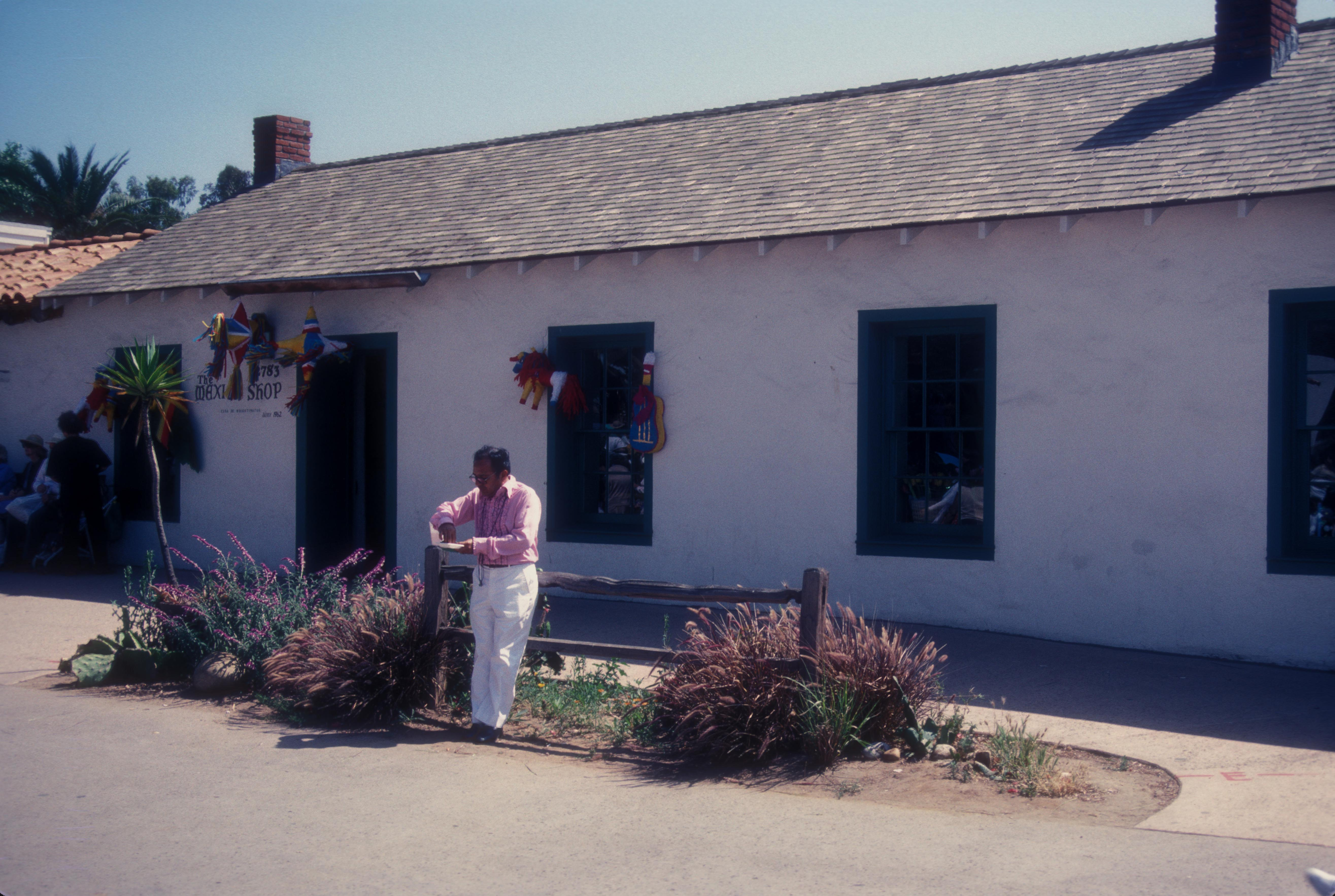
Casa de Machado y Silvas in 2008

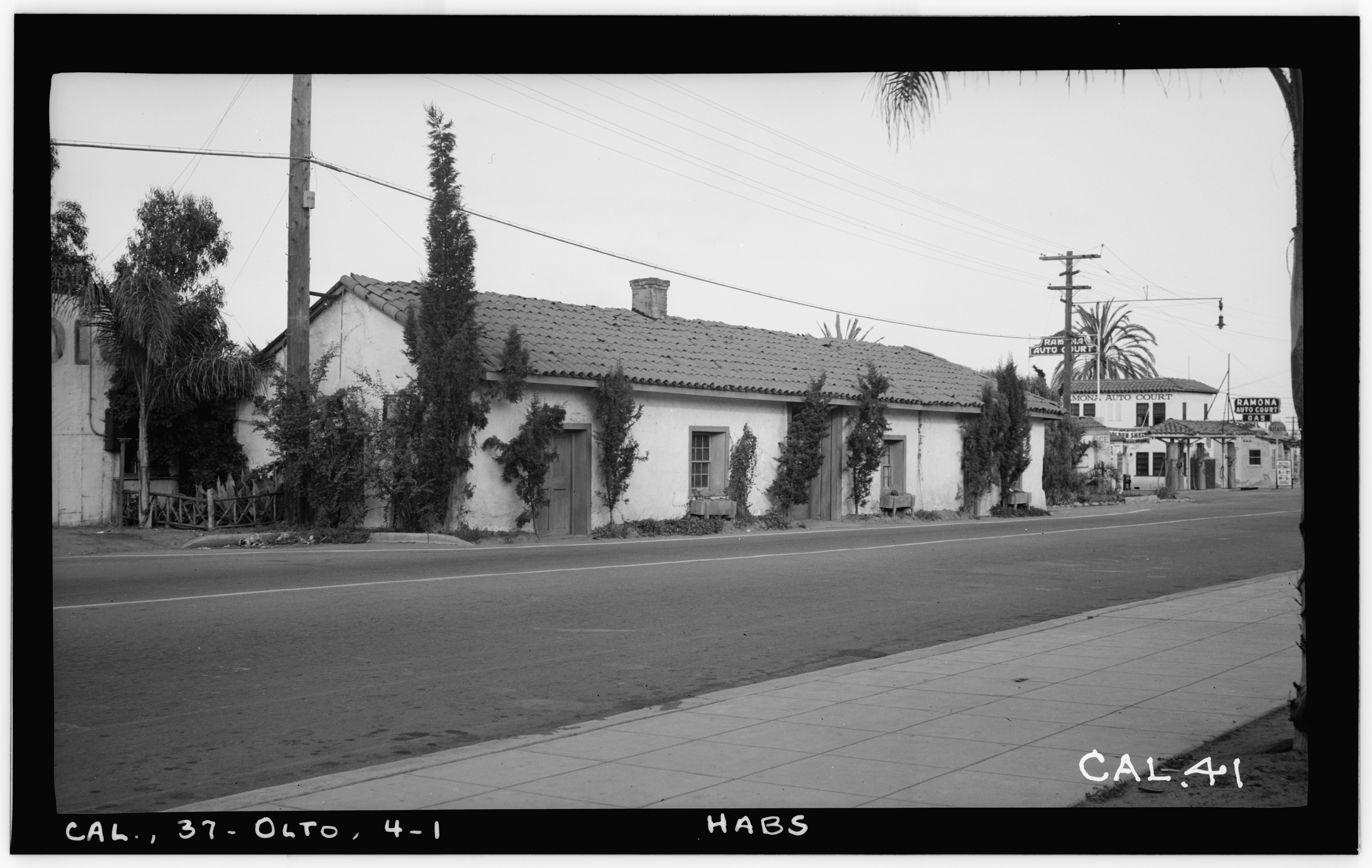
Casa de Machado in 1937

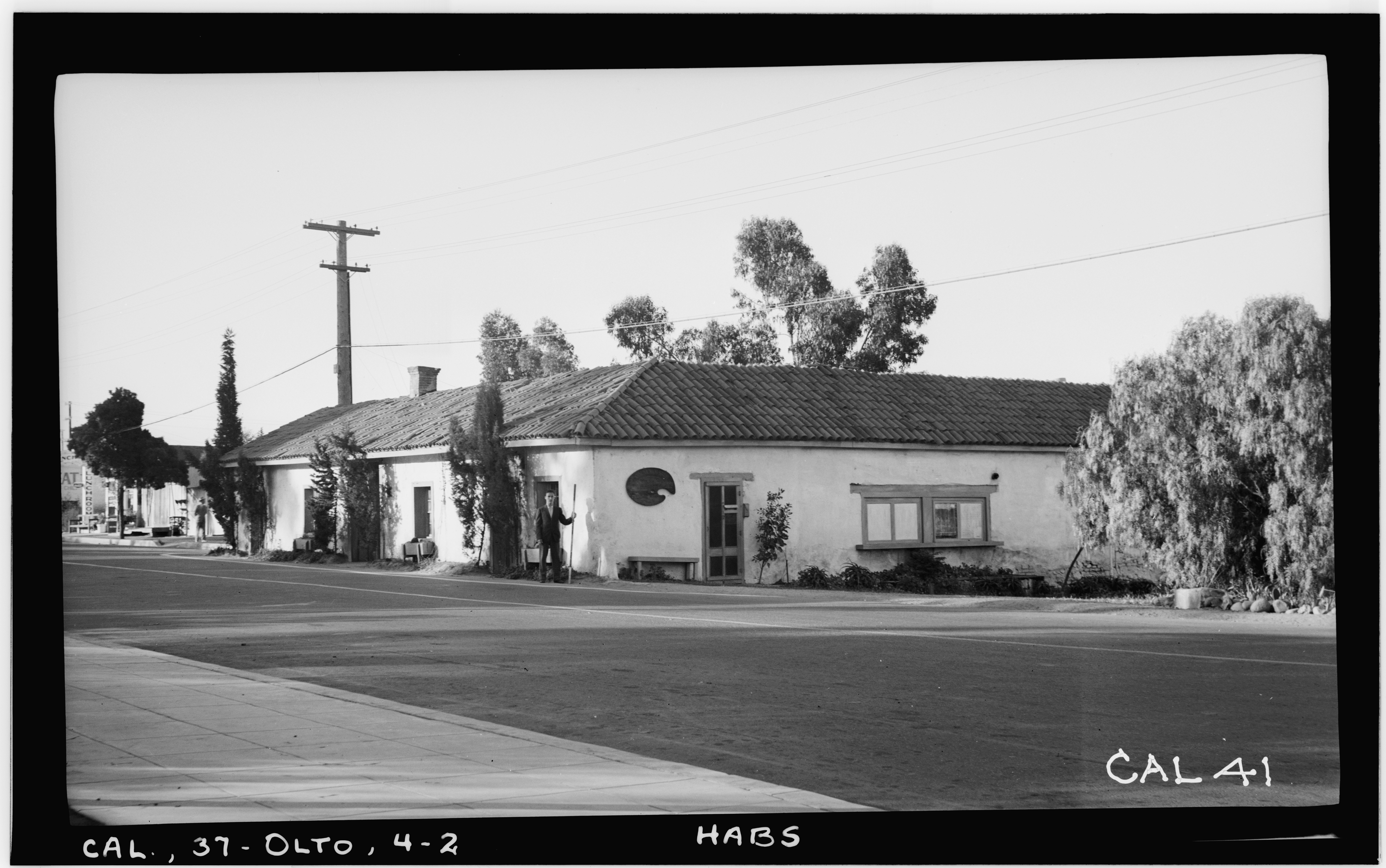
Casa de Machado in 1937

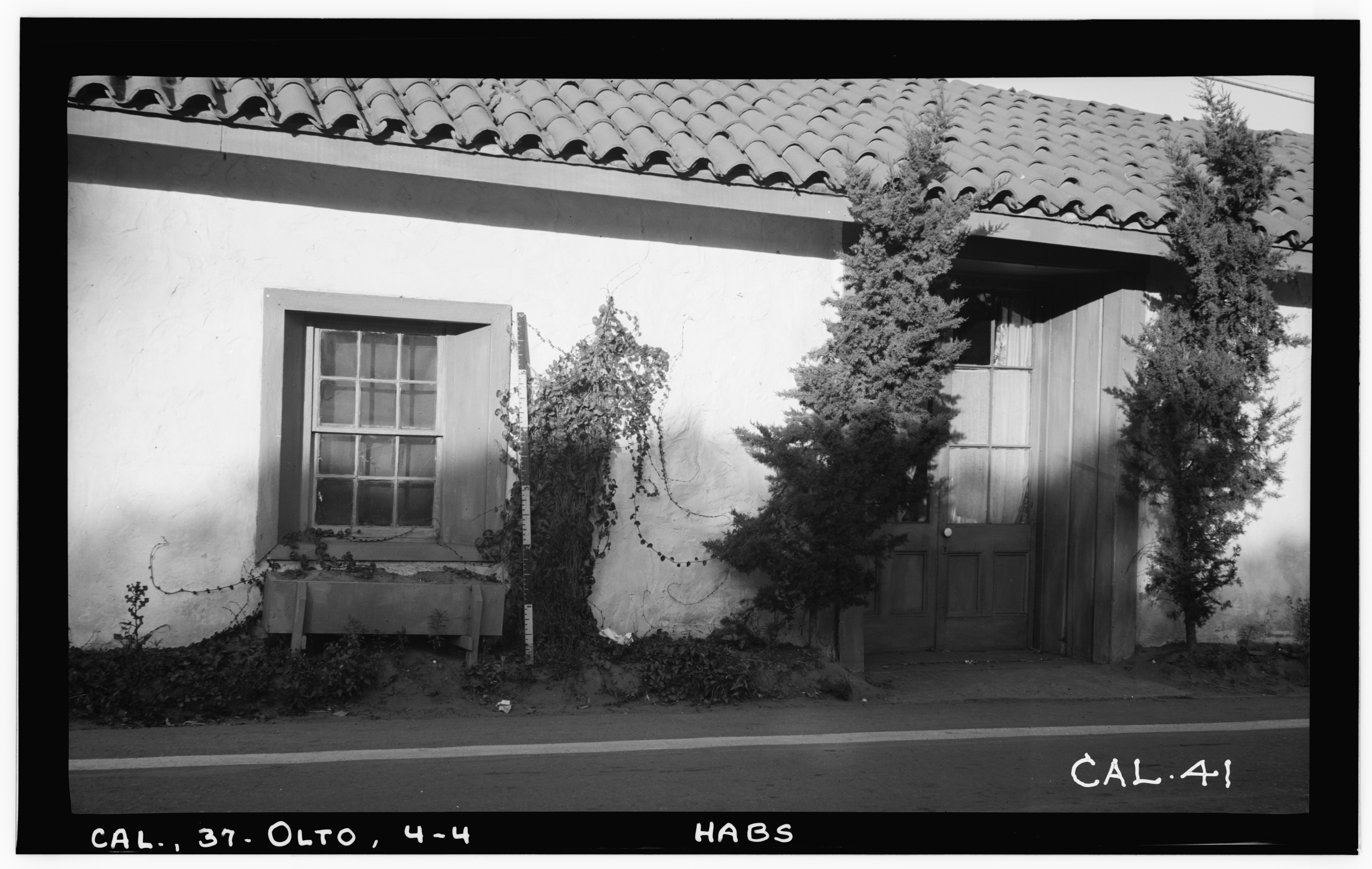
Casa de Machado door and window in 1937

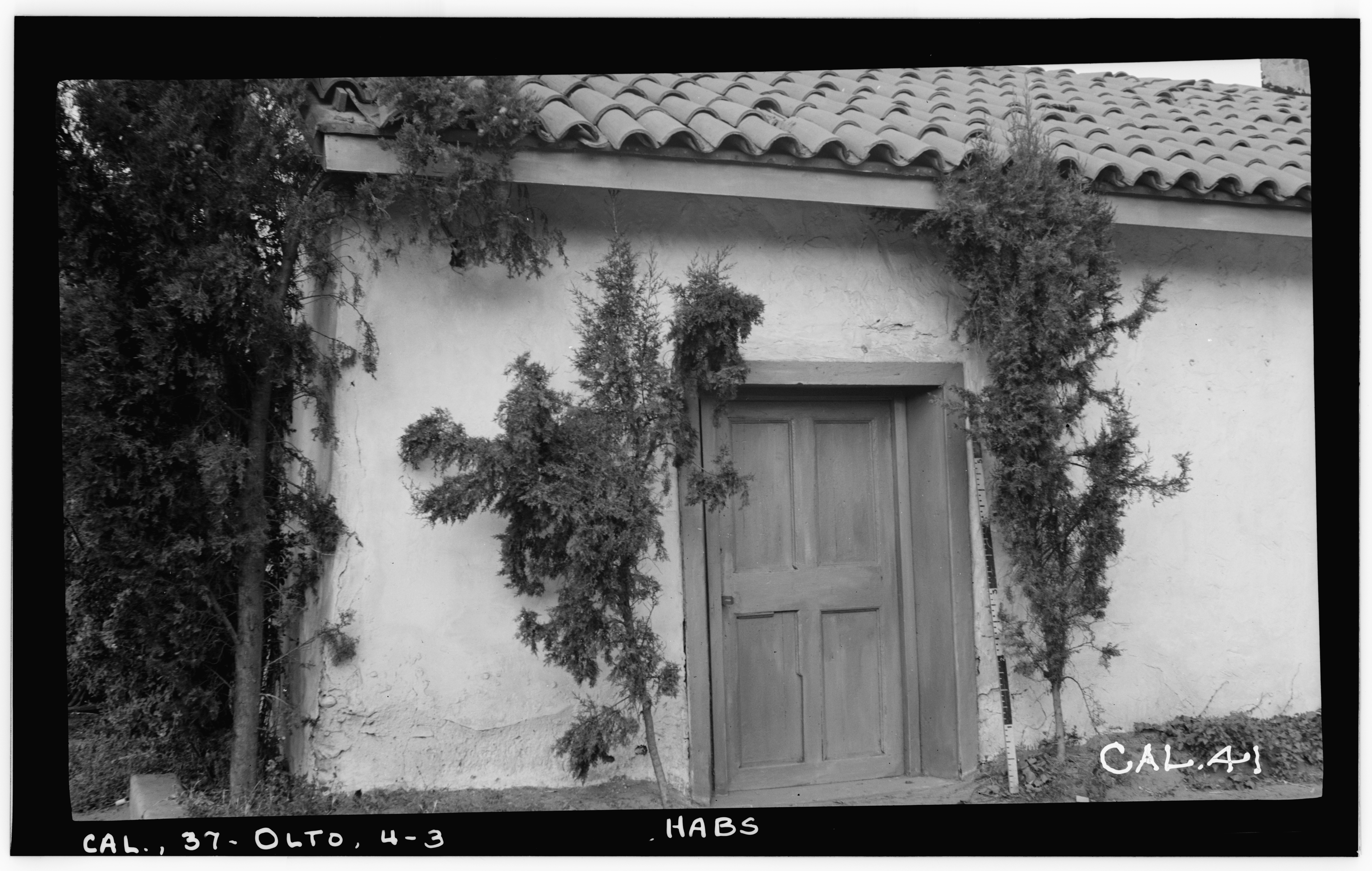
Casa de Machado door in 1937

== See also ==
- California Historical Landmarks in San Diego County
- Adobe Chapel of The Immaculate Conception
- Casa de Carrillo House
- Casa de Estudillo
- Casa de Cota
- Mission San Diego de Alcalá
- Presidio of San Diego
