= Casa de Pedrorena de Altamirano =

Historical Landmark in San Diego, California, United States

Casa de Pedrorena
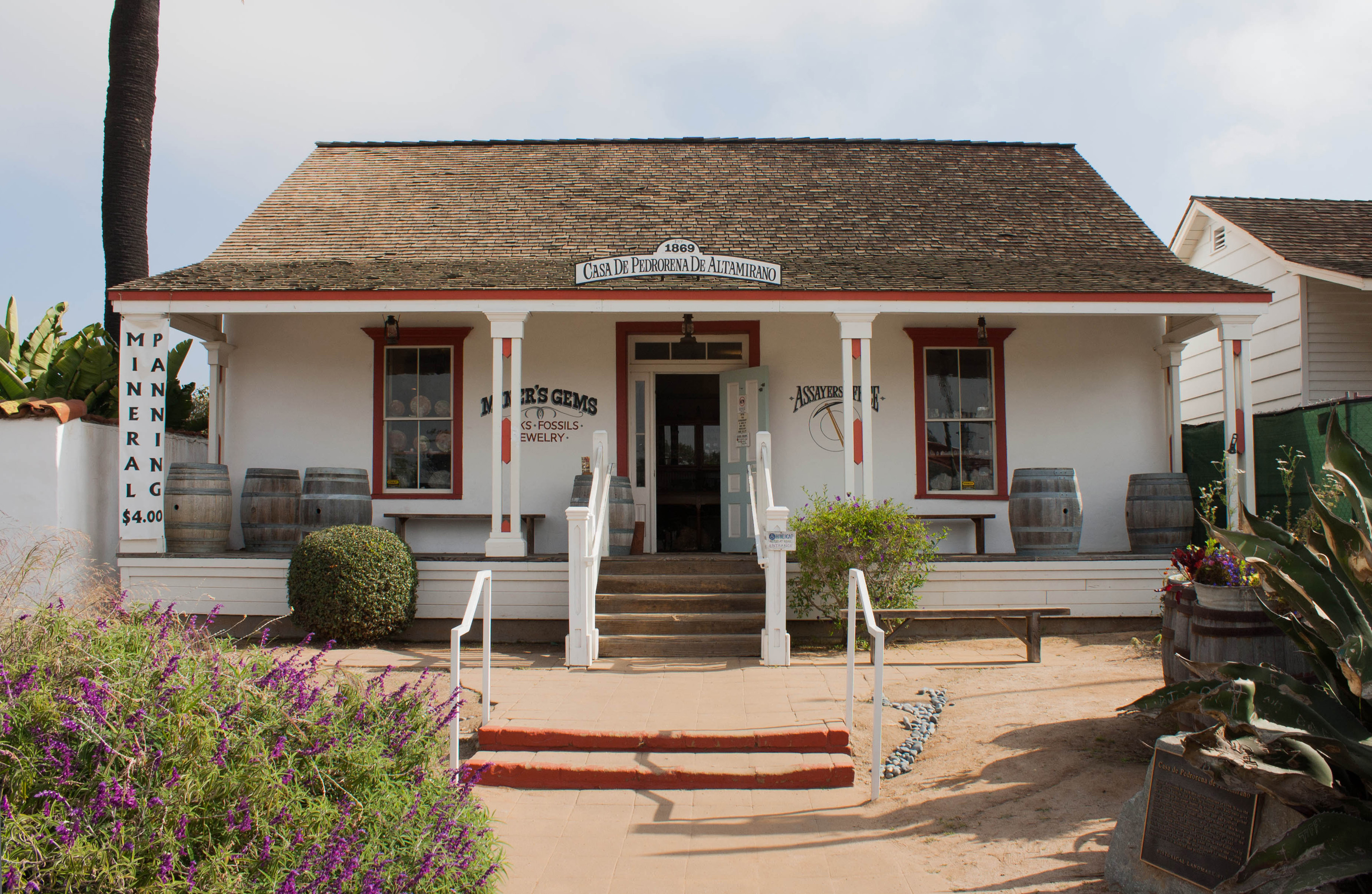
- Casa de Pedrorena

- Location within California Location within the United States
- 32.7537°N 117.1963°W
- Location: 2616 San Diego Ave, San Diego, California

History
- Built: 1869

Site notes
- Architect: Miguel de Pedrorena
- Architectural style: Adobe

California Historical Landmark
- Designated: December 6, 1932
- Reference no.: 70

Casa de Pedrorena, also called Altamirano-Pedrorena House is a historical Adobe building in San Diego, California, built in 1869. The Casa de Lopez site is a California Historical Landmark No. 70, listed on December 6, 1932. Casa de Pedrorena was the home of Miguel de Pedrorena. In 1838, Miguel de Pedrorena arrived in San Diego Viejo. Don Miguel was a member of the California Constitutional Conventions at Monterey, California in 1849. The Monterey Convention of 1849 was the first California Constitutional Convention to take place, a major decision of the convention was to ban slavery and set state boundaries. Pedrorena's sister, Isabel de Altamirano, received the house in January 1871. Isabel de Altamirano married Jose Antonio Altamirano and they raised their family here. Jose Antonio Altamirano was born in 1835 in La Paz, Baja California. Jose Altamirano arrived in San Diego in 1849. In San Diego, he did some mining and raised cattle in San Diego and Baja California. The house's current address, 2616 San Diego Ave in Old Town, San Diego. Casa de Pedrorena is the newest and last of Old Town San Diego's adobe houses.

== See also ==
- California Historical Landmarks in San Diego County
- Adobe Chapel of The Immaculate Conception
- Casa de Carrillo House
- Casa de Estudillo
- Casa de Cota
- Mission San Diego de Alcalá
- Presidio of San Diego
