= Los Puertecitos =

Historical Landmark in San Diego, California, United States

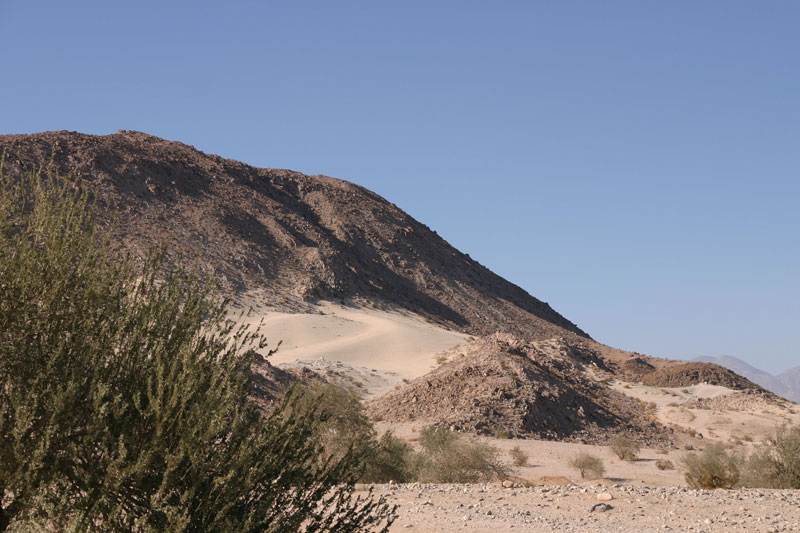
- Anza Borrego near the Los Puertecitos campsite

- Location within California Location within the United States
- 33.139°N 116.104°W
- Location: Ocotillo Wells, California; Anza-Borrego Desert State Park

History
- Built: December 20–22, 1775.

California Historical Landmark
- Designated: March 3, 1958
- Reference no.: 635

Los Puertecitos Pass (transl. the Little Doors) in Ocotillo Wells, California, in San Diego County, is California Historical Landmark No. 635 listed on March 3, 1958. The Los Puertecitos is a desert pass used by the Spanish Commander Juan Bautista de Anza and Father Francisco Garcés expedition of 1775 and 1776. The expedition came through the pass on December 19, 1775. Near the pass on a flats east of the pass the expedition rested and watered its stock of mules, cattle, and horses.

The expedition passed through the Imperial Valley then though the Colorado Desert, now Anza-Borrego Desert State Park. The expedition's goal was to start Spanish missions in California and presidio forts though Las Californias to San Francisco Bay. The expedition route is now the Juan Bautista de Anza National Historic Trail.

A historical marker is near the pass in the desert on California State Route 78 east of Ocotillo Wells in Anza-Borrego Desert State Park. The marker was placed there by the California State Park Commission working with Cuyamaca Parlor No. 298, Native Sons of the Golden West in 1959.

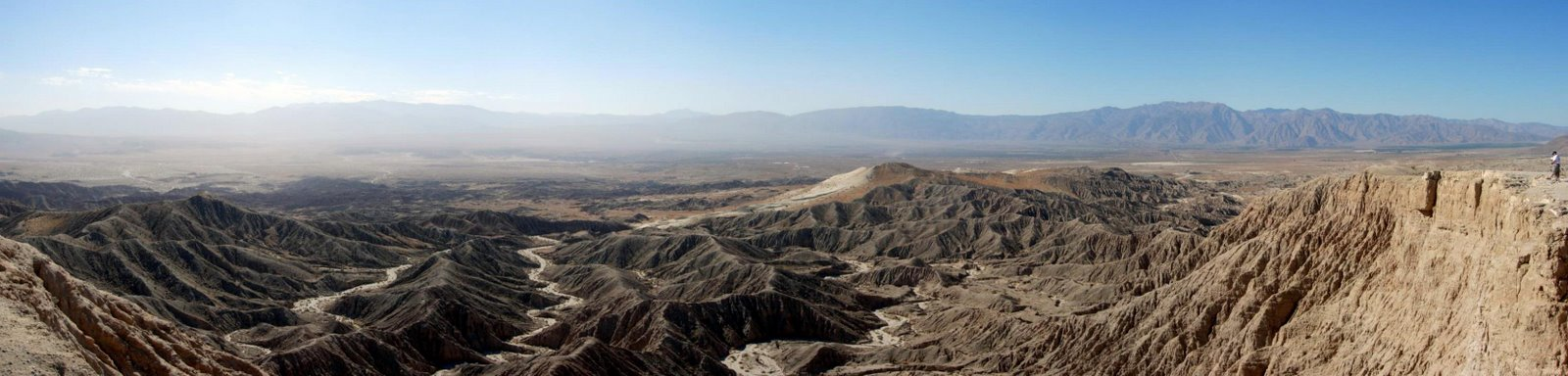
Panoramic view from Font's Point westward over Borrego Valley to the Laguna Mountains

== See also ==
- California Historical Landmarks in San Diego County
- El Vado
- Borrego Sink
- Box Canyon (Borrego Springs, California)
