= La Punta De Los Muertos =

Historical Landmark in San Diego, California, United States

La Punta de Los Muertos
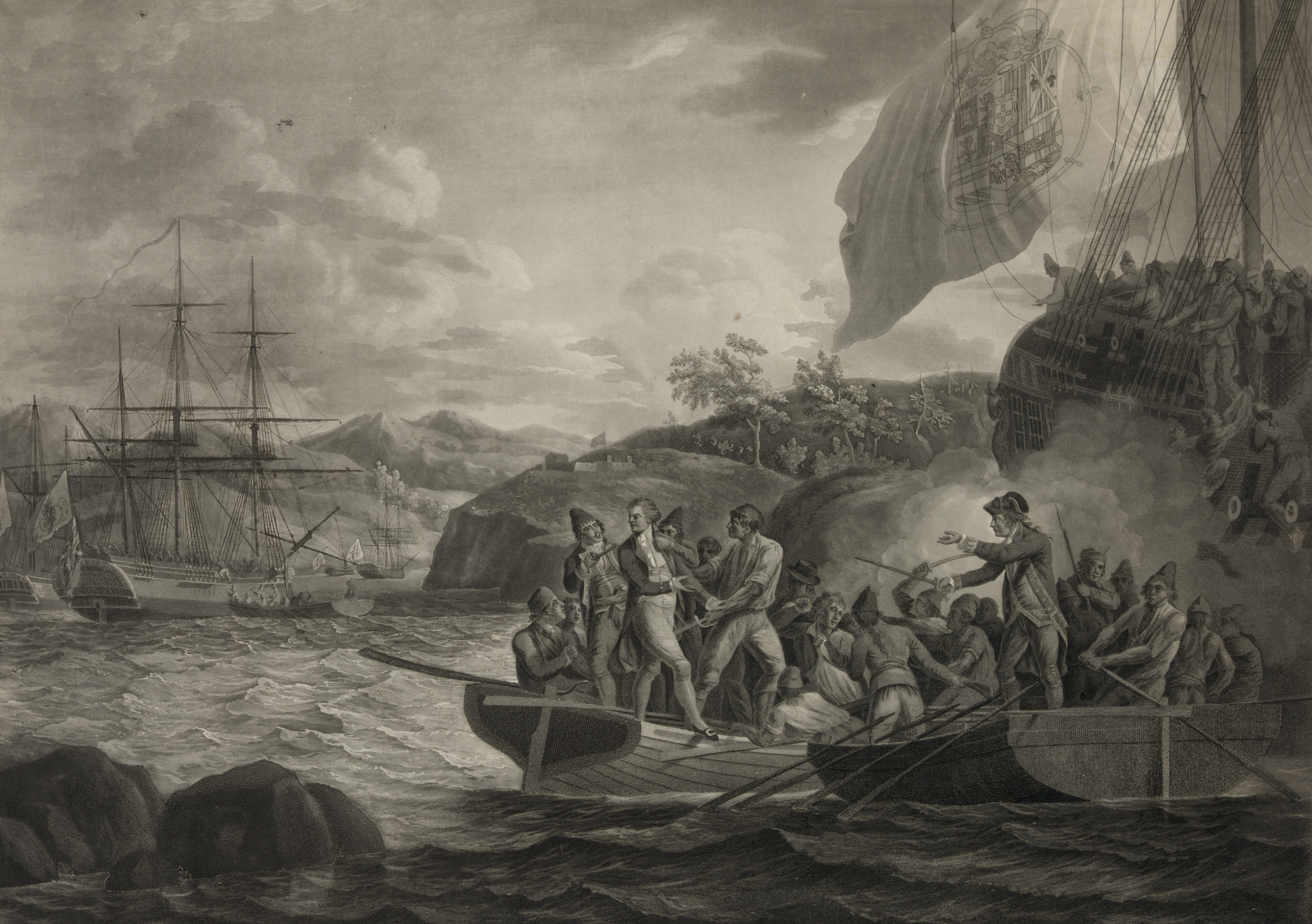
- La Princesa a 1778 ship on the right

- Location within California Location within the United States
- 32.7110°N 117.1709°W
- Location: San Diego Bay, San Diego, California

History
- Built: 1782

Site notes
- Architect: Don Juan Pantoja y Arriaga

California Historical Landmark
- Designated: December 6, 1932
- Reference no.: 57

La Punta de Los Muertos, also called Sailors, Dead Men's Point is a historical site in San Diego, California. La Punta de Los Muertos site is a California Historical Landmark No. 57, listed on December 6, 1932. The site is thought (site could be another place) to be the burial site of those that died in the survey party of Don Juan Pantoja y Arriaga and Don José Továr in 1782. Don Juan Pantoja y Arriaga arrived at San Diego Bay on the Spanish Empire Royal frigate La Princesa. With La Princesa was the frigate La Favorita. The ships were under the command of Don Augustín de Echeverria or Esteban José Martínez. La Princesa was under Agustín de Echeverría and Josef Tovar. Some sailors on the ships most likely died from scurvy or an intestinal disease, from lack of fresh food on the trip to San Diego. Esteban Martínez and Pantoja was also on the trip. Don Juan Pantoja was the leader of the San Diego Bay survey party, called the Pantoja Voyage. The site is now a city shopping mall and Ruocco Park, near the San Diego Police Museum.

A historical marker was placed on Harbor Drive and Pacific Highway (California Highway 163) in San Diego, in 1954 by San Diego County Board of Supervisors and the Historical Markers Committee.

== See also ==
- California Historical Landmarks in San Diego County
- Adobe Chapel of The Immaculate Conception
- Casa de Carrillo House
- Casa de Estudillo
- Casa de Cota
