= Gaskill Brothers' Stone Store =

Historical Landmark in San Diego, California, United States

Campo Stone Store
- Campo Stone Store in 1900

- Location within California Location within the United States
- 32.609°N 116.474°W
- Location: CA Route 94; Campo, California

History
- Built: 1868

Site notes
- Architect(s): Lumen and Silas Gaskill
- Architectural styles: Local stones and rocks

California Historical Landmark
- Designated: November 15, 1948
- Reference no.: 411

The Gaskill Brothers Stone Store (also known as the Campo Stone Store) is a historical building in Campo, California, built in 1868 by the Gaskill brothers as a general store. It is a California Historical Landmark No. 411, listed on November 15, 1948. All goods were stocked in bulk and sold by weight as the customer wanted, except prepackaged Arbuckle Coffee and Lion Coffee. The Gaskill Brothers' Stone Store Museum is run by the Mountain Empire Historical Society.

== History ==
Silas E Gaskill was born in New York on February 16, 1829. Luman H. Gaskill, the younger brother, was born in Steuben County, Indiana, on July 17, 1843. Their parents were Courtland Gaskill and Theresa Brink Gaskill. As part of the California Gold Rush in 1850, the 21 year old Silas traveled to California in a wagon train. In 1857, Luman and their parents followed Silas, but came by sail ship to San Francisco. Like many 49ers, the family tried mining for gold and also worked at the Buffalo Gold and Silver Mining Company in Petaluma, California. Silas and Luman departed mining and hunted bears.

In 1868, they departed the gold country and arrived in the Milquatay Valley, east of San Diego, just a mile from the Mexican border. Silas and Luman opened not just the store, but a blacksmith shop, and a gristmill in town. They also ran a bee farm and a small cattle ranch. Being a small town, Luman was also the town dentist, doctor, and Justice of the Peace. In 1868, Luman married Eliza J. Benson, they had seven children. In 1870, Silas married Kate, but they divorced 1873. In 1881, Silas married Catherine Scott, she died on December 26, 1914. Gaskill brothers sold all their properties in 1901 and retired to San Diego. On May 3, 1914, Luman died in Whittier California.

On December 4, 1875, the store was raided by Cruz Lopez and his border bandits. Eight were killed and two wounded after a gunfight between the citizens of Campo and the group of Mexican bandits. Luman was shot in the lung and Silas was wounded in the shoulder. The Mexican bandits had earlier killed the former Governor of Baja California Antonio Sosa.

It was bought in 1896 by E. T. Aiken, resold to Klauber Wangenheim in 1889, and operated by Henry Marcus Johnson as the Mountain Commercial Company until 1925. In disrepair, it was bought after 1938 by E. M. Statler, given to San Diego County, and restored from 1943 to 1948 as a museum.

A historical marker was placed at the store in 1986 by California State Parks working with the Department of Parks and Recreation and Squibob Chapter, E Clampus Vitus.

== See also ==
- California Historical Landmarks in San Diego County
- Adobe Chapel of The Immaculate Conception
- Casa de Carrillo House
- Casa de Estudillo
- Casa de Cota
