= Fort Stockton (San Diego, California) =

Historical Landmark in San Diego, California, United States

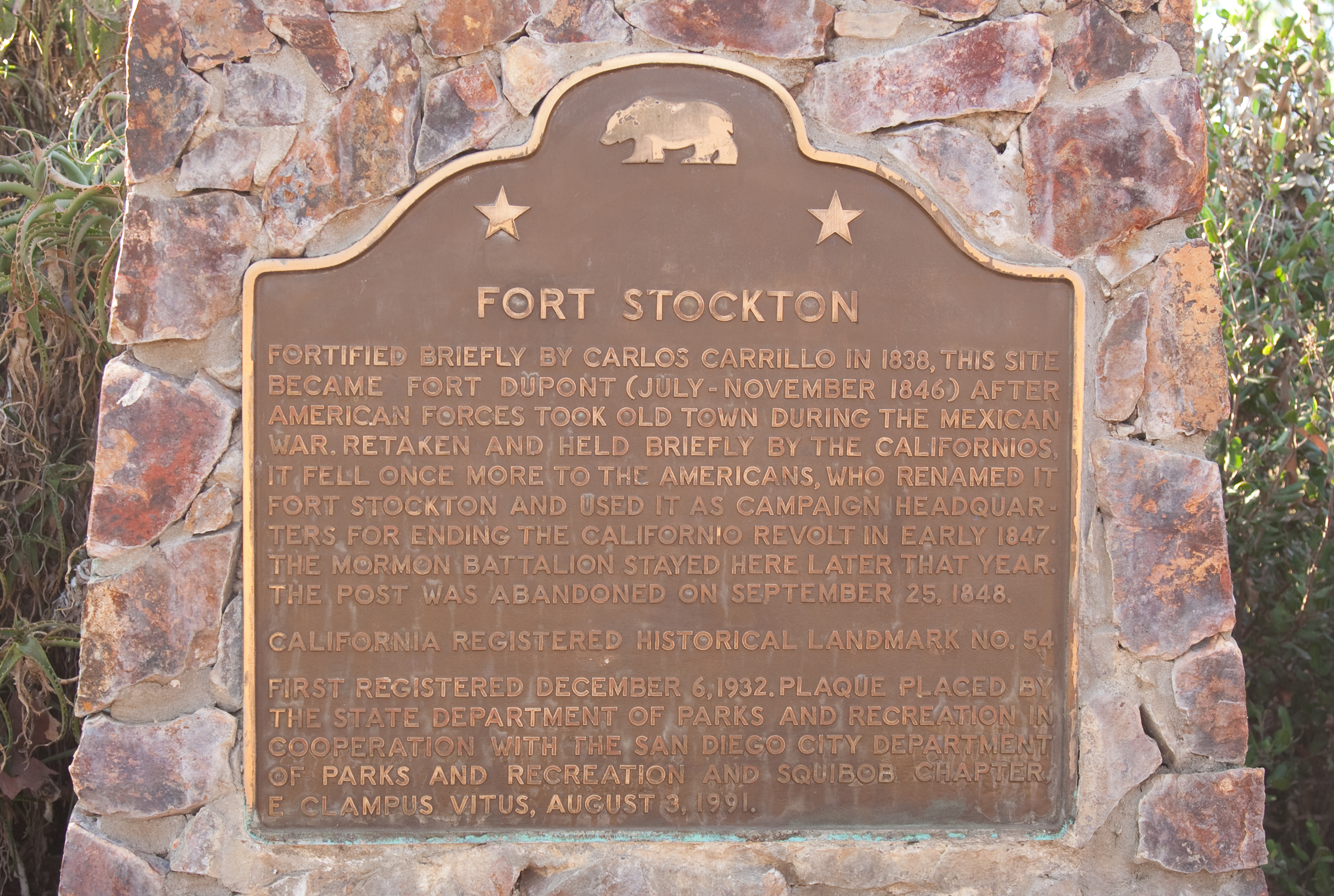
- Fort Stockton site historical landmark

- Location within California Location within the United States
- 32.7573°N 117.1937°W
- Location: Presidio Park; San Diego, California

History
- Built: 1828

Site notes
- Architect: Carlos Carrillo

California Historical Landmark
- Designated: December 6, 1932
- Reference no.: 54

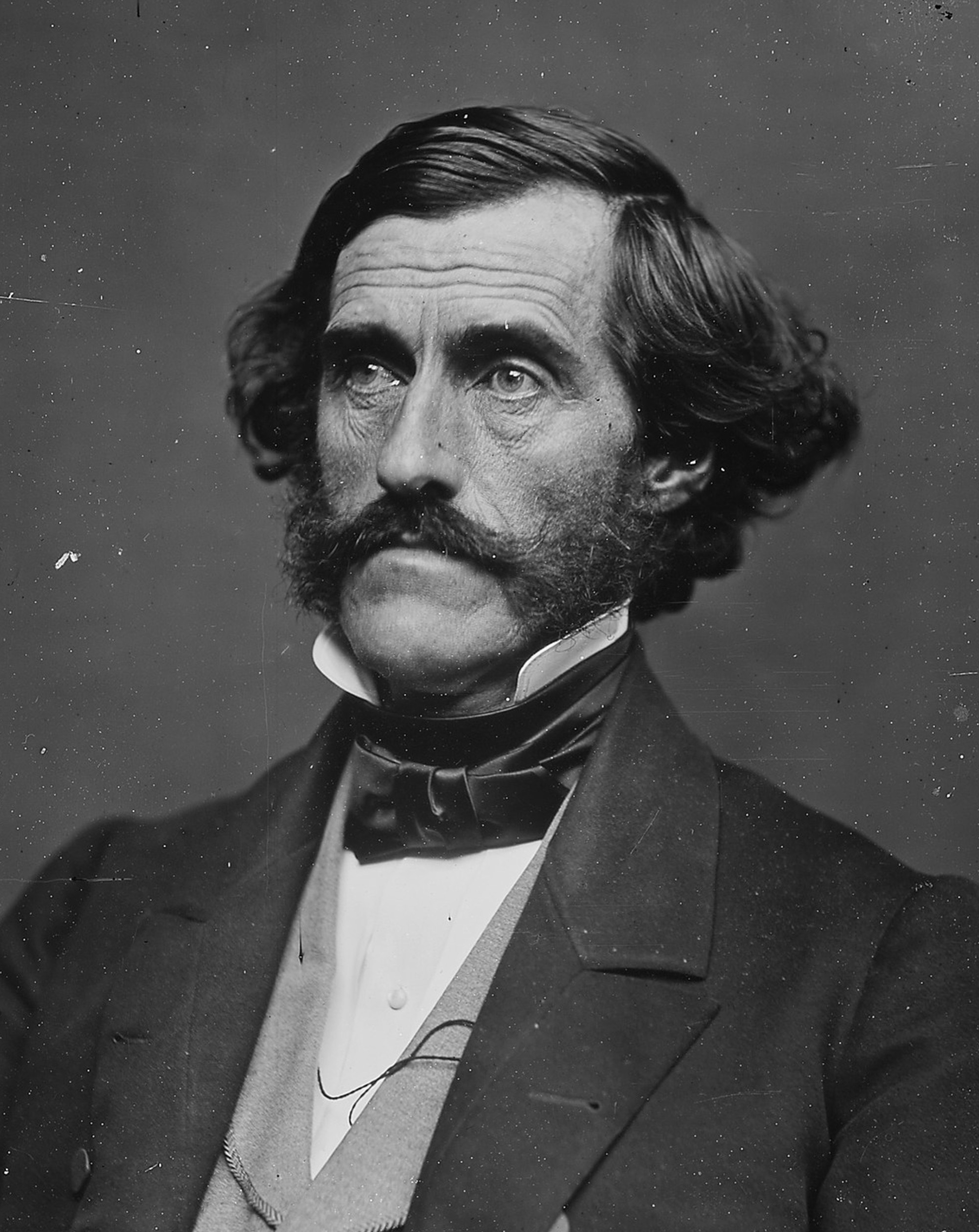
Commodore Robert F. Stockton, Fort Stockton's namesake

Fort Stockton, later called Fort Dupont, was a historical fortress in San Diego, California, built in 1828. The Fort Stockton site is a California Historical Landmark No. 54, listed on December 6, 1932.

== History ==
The fort was built by New Spain's Carlos Carrillo to overlook Pueblo de San Diego and San Diego Bay in Alta California. New Spain abandoned the fort in 1837. The fort became United States Army Fort Dupont from July 1846 to November 1846 when the United States Armed Forces took Old Town San Diego during the Mexican-American War. The fort was named after US Captain Samuel F. DuPont with the United States Navy that arrived on July 29, 1846, aboard USS Cyane with Major John C. Frémont and his troops, also Kit Carson and his men. Stephen Rowan and William A. T. Maddox with their troops were first to come ashore in San Diego. Those aboard Cyane rebuilt the old fort on the hill. After rebuilding the fort Frémont and most of his troops marched to Los Angeles. Cyane also went to Los Angeles to take Los Angeles. Captain Ezekiel Merritt and John Bidwell stayed behind and held Fort Dupont. The fort was abandoned shortly to Mexican Californios, Francisco Rico, and Serbulo Varela with 50 of his troops. The US chartered the whaling ship Magnolia to take troops and supplies to San Diego. The Magnolia crew of 35 sailors and 15 volunteers landed and laid siege to the fort, city, and port at San Diego, and the fort was retaken. Mexican Ramon Carrillo and Captain Leonardo Cota returned with troops to retake the fort on October 26, 1846. But on October 31, 1846, Commodore Robert F. Stockton arrived aboard the frigate USS Congress. The vessel was loaded with troops under Archibald H. Gillespie. Mexicans Santiago Arguello and Miguel de Pedrorena joined the US forces to retake the fort.

The fort, now retaken, was given more fortifications. The improved fort was renamed Fort Stockton after Robert F. Stockton. The fort was turned over to General Stephen Watts Kearny. Fort Stockton became the United States headquarters while forces ended the Californio revolt in early 1847. The Mormon Battalion camped at Fort Stockton shortly in 1847. At the end of the short war with the Treaty of Guadalupe Hidalgo on February 2, 1848, Fort Stockton was abandoned on September 25, 1848. The Fort Stockton site is now a hill in Presidio Park. A historical marker was placed on the hill on August 3, 1991, by the State Department of Parks and Recreation working with the San Diego City Department of Parks and Recreation and Squibob Chapter, E Clampus Vitus.

== See also ==
- California Historical Landmarks in San Diego County
- Adobe Chapel of The Immaculate Conception
- Casa de Carrillo House
- Casa de Estudillo
- Casa de Cota
