= La Cristianita Canyon =

Historical Landmark in San Diego, California, United States

La Cristianita
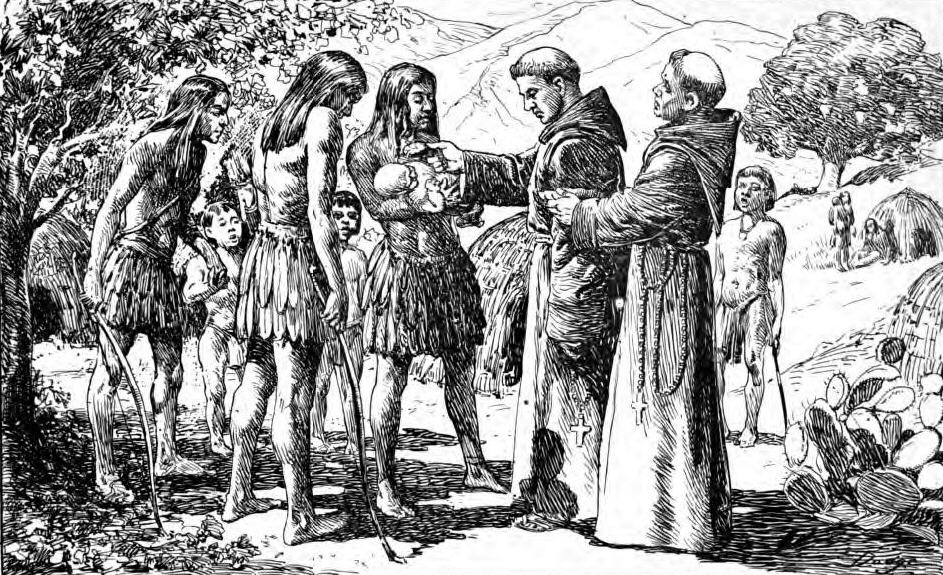
- La Christianita, first baptism by Francisco Góme in 1769

- Location within California Location within the United States
- 33.428°N 117.609°W
- Location: Cristianitos Road; Los Cristianitos Canyon; Marine Corps Base Camp Pendleton

History
- Built: July 22, 1769

Site notes
- Architect: Father Francisco Garcés
- Architectural style: Spring

California Historical Landmark
- Designated: December 31, 1956
- Reference no.: 562

La Cristianita Canyon, or La Christianita Canyon, Los Cristianitos Valley, Canyon of the Little Christians, La Cañada de los Bautismos (the baptism on the Anza Trail) is a canyon now on the Marine Corps Base Camp Pendleton in San Clemente, San Diego County. La Cristianita Canyon is a California Historical Landmark No. 562 listed on December 31, 1956. The site was a campsite for the Spanish Commander Juan Bautista de Anza and Father Francisco Garcés expedition of 1775 and 1776. The expedition camped at the site in July 1769. At the campsite was a spring where the expedition rested and watered its stock of mules, cattle, and horses.

While at the campsite they found Native Americans that had sick children. Father Francisco Gómez baptized the child on July 22, 1769. This was the first Christian Baptism in Alta California. A historical marker is at the site of the a first baptism on Marine Corps Base Camp Pendleton. Before the Marine Corps Base the site was on Mission San Luis Rey and then Rancho San Pedro.
A second La Cristianita marker, open to the public is at the Casa Romantica Cultural Center and Gardens at 415 Avenida Granada, San Clemente. The marker was at the Civic Center.

The Spanish Empire Anza expedition passed through the Imperial Valley then though the Colorado Desert, now Anza-Borrego Desert State Park. The expedition's goal was to start Spanish missions in California and presidio forts though Las Californias to San Francisco Bay. The expedition route is now the Juan Bautista de Anza National Historic Trail.

== See also ==
- California Historical Landmarks in San Diego County
- El Vado
- Borrego Sink
