= California Historical Landmarks in San Diego County =

A list including the properties and districts listed on the California Historical Landmarks in San Diego County, Southern California.

- Note: Click the "Map of all coordinates" link to the right to view a Google map of all properties and districts with latitude and longitude coordinates in the table below.

== Listed landmarks ==
Image		Landmark name	Location	City or town	Summary
Adobe Chapel of The Immaculate Conception	49	Adobe Chapel of The Immaculate Conception	3950 Conde St. 32°45′06″N 117°11′39″W	San Diego	
Ballast Point Whaling Station	50	Ballast Point Whaling Station	Naval Base Point Loma	San Diego	Restricted access
Berkeley	1031	Berkeley	Docked at 1306 North Harbor Dr. 32°43′07″N 117°10′22″W	San Diego	
Camp Lockett	1045	Camp Lockett	near Campo Rd. and Forest Gate Rd. 32°36′25″N 116°28′18″W	Campo	
San Gregorio	673	San Gregorio	Borrego Sink, Anza-Borrego Desert State Park; 33°13′19″N 116°16′12″W	Borrego Springs	
Box Canyon	472	Box Canyon	Anza-Borrego Desert State Park; 33°00′54″N 116°26′31″W	Borrego Springs	
Butterfield Overland Mail Route	647	Butterfield Overland Mail Route	Anza-Borrego Desert State Park, Blair Valley	Borrego Springs	
Cabrillo National Monument	56	Cabrillo National Monument	Point Loma; 32°40′23″N 117°14′19″W	San Diego	
Camp Wright	482	Camp Wright	State Hwy 79; 33°23′23″N 116°47′39″W	Oak Grove	
Casa de Bandini	72	Casa de Bandini	NE corner of Mason and Calhoun Sts., Old Town San Diego State Historic Park	San Diego	
Casa de Carrillo	74	Casa de Carrillo	Presidio Hills Golf Course; NE of Juan St. on Wallace St. 32°45′22″N 117°11′46″W	San Diego	
Casa de Cota	75	Casa de Cota	Twiggs and Congress Sts., Old Town; 32°45′07″N 117°11′46″W	San Diego	Site of former Casa de Cota house
Casa de Estudillo	53	Casa de Estudillo	4000 Mason St. 32°45′14″N 117°11′45″W	San Diego	
Casa de Lopez	60	Casa de Lopez	3890 Twiggs St., Old Town; 32°45′07″N 117°11′49″W	San Diego	
Casa de Machado y Silvas	71	Casa de Machado y Silvas	Old Town San Diego State Historic Park	San Diego	
Casa de Pedrorena de Altamirano	70	Casa de Pedrorena de Altamirano	2616 San Diego Ave, Old Town San Diego State Historic Park; 32°45′14″N 117°11′47″W	San Diego	
Casa de Stewart	73	Casa de Stewart	Congress and Mason Sts., Old Town San Diego State Historic Park; 32°45′12″N 117°11′52″W	San Diego	Also called Casa de Machado y Stewart
Chapel of Santa Ysabel	369	Chapel of Santa Ysabel	Santa Ysabel Asistencia; 33°07′49″N 116°40′41″W	Santa Ysabel	
Congress Hall	66	Congress Hall	Vacant lot, south side of 2734 Calhoun St., Old Town San Diego State Historic Park; 32°45′18″N 117°11′52″W	San Diego	Demolished in 1939
Derby Dike	244	Derby Dike	Presidio Park; 32°45′34″N 117°11′46″W	San Diego	
El Camino Real	784	El Camino Real	Mission San Diego de Alcalá; 32°42′N 117°06′W	San Diego	El Camino Real Mission Trail
El Campo Santo	68	El Campo Santo	On San Diego Ave. between Arista and Conde Sts. 32°45′05″N 117°11′36″W	San Diego	
El Desembarcadero	64	El Desembarcadero	2900 block of Farragut Rd. 32°44′N 117°13′W	San Diego	
El Vado	634	El Vado	Anza-Borrego Desert State Park; 33°18′04″N 116°23′02″W	Borrego Springs	Anza expedition campsite in 1775
Exchange Hotel	491	Exchange Hotel	2729 San Diego Ave., Old Town San Diego State Historic Park; 32°45′14″N 117°11′49″W	San Diego	Lost in 1872 fire
Fort Guijarros	69	Fort Guijarros	Naval Base Point Loma; 32°40′12″N 117°14′31″W	San Diego	
Fort Rosecrans	62	Fort Rosecrans	Naval Base Point Loma; 32°40′37″N 117°14′41″W	San Diego	
Fort Rosecrans National Cemetery	55	Fort Rosecrans National Cemetery	Cabrillo Memorial Dr. 32°41′12″N 117°14′41″W	San Diego	
Fort Stockton	54	Fort Stockton	Presidio Park; 32°45′34″N 117°11′31″W	San Diego	
Gaskill Brothers' Stone Store	411	Gaskill Brothers' Stone Store	State Hwy 94; 32°36′32″N 116°28′26″W	Campo	Also called Gaskill’s Brothers Stone Store
Giant Dipper	1044	Giant Dipper	3190 Mission Blvd. 32°46′17″N 117°15′06″W	San Diego	
Hotel del Coronado	844	Hotel del Coronado	1500 Orange Ave. 32°40′51″N 117°10′42″W	Coronado	
Hubert H. Bancroft Ranch House	626	Hubert H. Bancroft Ranch House	One block E of Memory and Bancroft Dr; 32°44′11″N 116°59′18″W	Spring Valley	
Julian	412	Julian	Historic district 33°04′15″N 116°35′08″W	Julian	
Kate O. Sessions Nursery	764	Kate O. Sessions Nursery	Garnet Ave. and Pico St. 32°48′19″N 117°13′23″W	San Diego	
La Cristianita	562	La Cristianita	Marine Corps Base Camp Pendleton, Los Cristianitos Canyon; 33°25′42″N 117°36′35″W	San Clemente	
La Playa	61	La Playa	On left side of Rosecrans St., at entrance to Military Reserve, Point Loma; 32°42′44″N 117°14′43″W	San Diego	
Las Flores Estancia	616	Las Flores Estancia	Marine Corps Base Camp Pendleton; 33°18′00″N 117°27′40″W	San Clemente	
La Punta De Los Muertos	57	La Punta De Los Muertos	Market St. and Pacific Hwy. 32°42′36″N 117°10′16″W	San Diego	Sailors, Dead Men's Point
Leo Carrillo Ranch (Rancho de los Kiotes)	1020	Leo Carrillo Ranch (Rancho de los Kiotes)	6200 Flying L.C. Lane	Carlsbad	
Los Puertecitos	635	Los Puertecitos	State Hwy 78; 33°08′24″N 116°06′18″W	Ocotillo Wells	
Mason Street School	538	Mason Street School	3966 Mason St., Old Town San Diego State Historic Park; 32°45′12″N 117°11′50″W	San Diego	
Mission San Diego de Alcalá	242	Mission San Diego de Alcalá	10818 San Diego Mission Rd. 32°47′04″N 117°06′23″W	San Diego	
Mission San Luis Rey de Francia	239	Mission San Luis Rey de Francia	4050 Mission Ave. 33°13′57″N 117°19′13″W	Oceanside	
Montgomery Memorial	711	Montgomery Memorial	Coronado Ave. and Beyer Blvd. 32°34′43″N 117°04′08″W	San Diego	
Mule Hill	452	Mule Hill	Pomerado Rd.	Escondido	
National City Santa Fe Rail Depot	1023	National City Santa Fe Rail Depot	900 West 23 St.	National City	
Oak Grove Butterfield Stage Station	502	Oak Grove Butterfield Stage Station	33°23′26″N 116°47′42″W	Warner Springs	
Old Mission Dam	52	Old Mission Dam	Mission Trails Regional Park; 32°50′24″N 117°02′32″W	San Diego	
Old Point Loma Lighthouse	51	Old Point Loma Lighthouse	Cabrillo National Monument; 32°40′18″N 117°14′27″W	San Diego	
Old Town San Diego State Historic Park	830	Old Town San Diego State Historic Park	Old Town San Diego State Historic Park; 32°45′17″N 117°11′50″W	San Diego	
Palm Spring	639	Palm Spring	Anza-Borrego Desert State Park; 32°55′08″N 116°13′05″W	Agua Caliente Springs	
Pedro Fages Trail	858	Pedro Fages Trail	1.7 mi SE on Sunrise Hwy; 32°59′40″N 116°32′33″W	Julian	
Peg Leg Smith Monument	750	Peg Leg Smith Monument	Anza-Borrego Desert State Park	Agua Caliente Springs	
Plaza San Diego Viejo	63	Plaza San Diego Viejo	Old Town San Diego State Historic Park; 32°45′17″N 117°11′51″W	San Diego	Also called Plaza de Las Armas
Presidio of San Diego	59	Presidio of San Diego	Presidio of San Diego; 32°45′31″N 117°11′36″W	San Diego	
Rancho Cañada de los Coches	425	Rancho Cañada de los Coches	13468 Old Hwy 80; 32°50′N 116°51′W	Lakeside	
Rancho Guajome	940	Rancho Guajome	Guajome Regional Park; 33°16′N 117°16′W	Vista	
Rancho Santa Fe	982	Rancho Santa Fe	Rancho Santa Fe; 33°01′26″N 117°12′00″W	Rancho Santa Fe	
Rancho Santa Margarita y Las Flores	1026	Rancho Santa Margarita y Las Flores	Marine Corps Base Camp Pendleton; 33°23′N 117°34′W	San Diego	
Rockwell Field	818	Rockwell Field	North Island	San Diego	
San Antonio de Pala Asistencia	243	San Antonio de Pala Asistencia	Mission on Pala Mission Rd. 33°21′40″N 117°04′45″W	Pala	
San Diego Barracks	523	San Diego Barracks	Parking lot on N side of Market St. 32°42′42″N 117°10′12″W	San Diego	
San Diego State University	798	San Diego State University	Entrance to service area of Viejas Arena	San Diego	
San Felipe-Butterfield Stage Station	793	San Felipe-Butterfield Stage Station	County Hwy. S2; 33°06′07″N 116°29′02″W		
San Pasqual Battlefield State Historic Park	533	San Pasqual Battlefield State Historic Park	San Pasqual Battlefield State Historic Park; 33°05′10″N 116°59′24″W	Escondido	
Santa Catarina	785	Santa Catarina	Anza-Borrego Desert State Park	Borrego Springs	
Serra Palm	67	Serra Palm	Presidio Park; 32°45′34″N 117°11′46″W	San Diego	
Spanish Landing	891	Spanish Landing	Spanish Landing Park; 32°43′43″N 117°12′25″W	San Diego	
Star of India	1030	Star of India	Docked at 1306 North Harbor Dr. 32°43′14″N 117°10′25″W	San Diego	
USS Recruit	1042	USS Recruit	In shopping center off of Laning Rd, at Tatnall Ln, San Diego; 32°43′43″N 117°12′59″W	San Diego	
Vallecito Station	304	Vallecito Station	Vallecito Stage Station County Park	Agua Caliente Springs	
Warner's Ranch	311	Warner's Ranch	On County Hwy S2; 33°14′19″N 116°39′03″W	Warner Springs	
Whaley House	65	Whaley House	2482 San Diego Ave., Old Town; 32°45′10″N 117°11′40″W	San Diego	

== See also ==
- List of California Historical Landmarks
- List of San Diego Historic Landmarks
- National Register of Historic Places listings in San Diego County, California
