= New San Diego Barracks =

Historical Landmark in San Diego, California, United States

New San Diego Barracks San Diego Barracks
- One building of the San Diego Barracks at New San Diego

- Location within California Location within the United States
- 32.7116°N 117.1700°W
- Location: San Diego, California

History
- Built: 1850

California Historical Landmark
- Designated: November 1, 1954
- Reference no.: 523

New San Diego Barracks, also called San Diego Barracks, was a United States Army quartermaster supply depot with barracks, warehouses, stables, and a hay house set up by Captain Nathaniel Lyon, with the 2nd U.S. Infantry, in 1850 at New San Diego. The depot had a wharf on San Diego Bay to load and unload supplies. The depot supported Southern California forts, stations and posts with military supplies. New San Diego Barracks was renamed to San Diego Barracks by General Orders No. 2, Military Division of the Pacific, San Francisco on April 5, 1879. The land for the depot was sold to the US Army by Gray, Johns, George F. Hooper, Davis and wife, Jose Aguirre and wife, and the heirs of Miguel de Pedrorena on September 12, 1850. The Great Flood of 1862 turned the depot into a sea of water and mud. One of the forts that San Diego Barracks supported was Fort Yuma used from 1851 to 1883. San Diego Barracks was built in what was called at the time New San Diego, on San Diego Bay, south of Pueblo de San Diego (Old Town) founded in 1835. New San Diego was built up by William Heath Davis in the early 1850s, in that he called New Town San Diego.

The depot closed on December 15, 1921, when the depot moved to Fort Rosecrans.

San Diego Barracks in San Diego, California, in San Diego County, is California Historical Landmark No. 523 listed on November 1, 1954.

A historical marker was put at the site of the former San Diego Barracks in 1955, on West Harbor Drive, half a block east of Ruocco Park, by the San Diego County Board of Supervisors and the Historical Markers Committee.

== See also ==
- California Historical Landmarks in San Diego County
- El Campo Santo
