= Santa Catarina Springs =

Historical Landmark in San Diego, California, United States

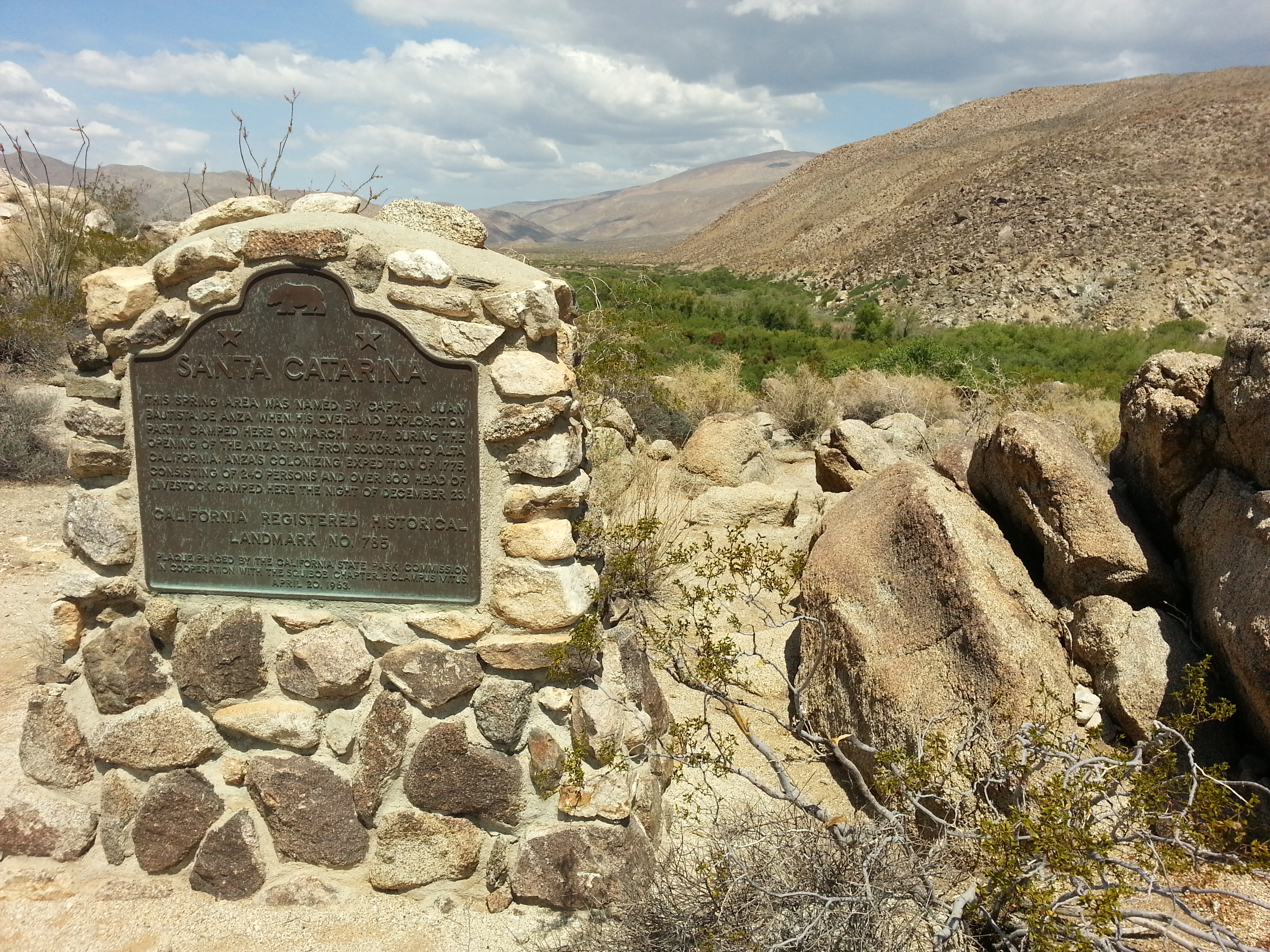
- Santa Catarina Springs plaque on dirt road

- Location within California Location within the United States
- 33.3720°N 116.4407°W
- Location: Santa Catarina Springs; Anza-Borrego Desert State Park

History
- Built: March 14, 1774

California Historical Landmark
- Designated: March 18, 1963
- Reference no.: 785

Santa Catarina campsite (transl. Saint Catherine or Catherine of Alexandria) in the Borrego Valley, Borrego Springs, California, in San Diego County, is a California Historical Landmark No. 785 listed on March 3, 1958. The Santa Catarina campsite was a desert camp for the Spanish Commander Juan Bautista de Anza and Father Francisco Garcés expedition of 1775 and 1776. At the campsite the expedition rested and watered its stock of mules, cattle, and horses on March 14, 1774.

The expedition passed through the Imperial Valley then though the Colorado Desert, now Anza-Borrego Desert State Park. The expedition's goal was to start Spanish missions in California and presidio forts though Las Californias to San Francisco Bay. The expedition route is now the Juan Bautista de Anza National Historic Trail.

A historical marker is near the campsite in the desert on Santa Catarina Springs, 10 Miles Northwest of Borrego Springs on 4 wheel drive road, in Anza-Borrego Desert State Park. The marker was placed there by the California State Parks Commission working with the Squibob Chapter, E Clampus Vitus in 1963.

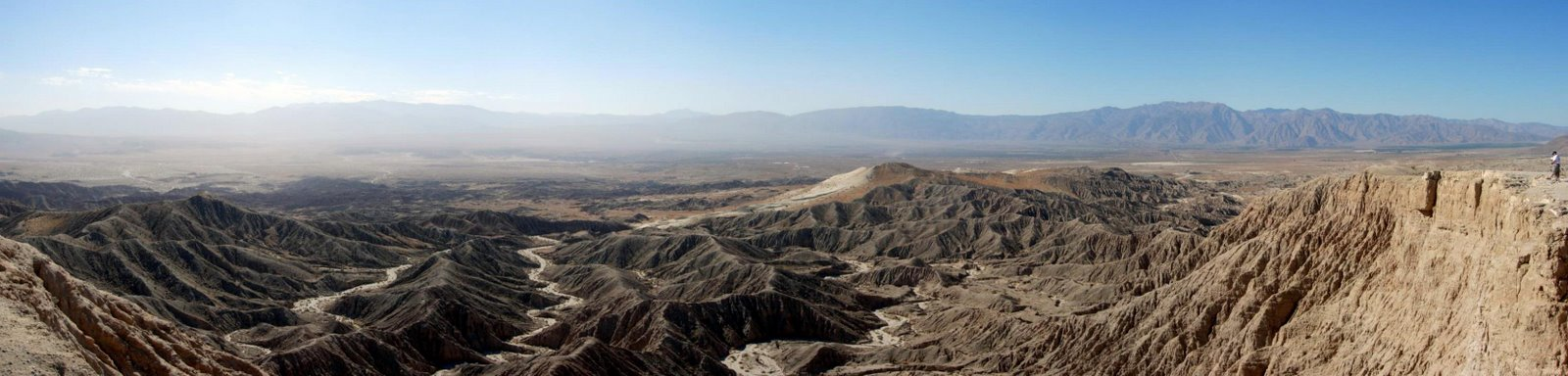
Panoramic view from Font's Point westward over Borrego Valley to the Laguna Mountains

== See also ==
- California Historical Landmarks in San Diego County
- Borrego Valley groundwater basin
- Box Canyon (Borrego Springs, California)
