= Fort Stockton =

Fort Stockton may refer to:

- Fort Stockton (San Diego, California), a historical fort
- Fort Stockton, Texas, a city
