= Congress Hall (San Diego, California) =

Historic building in San Diego, California, United States

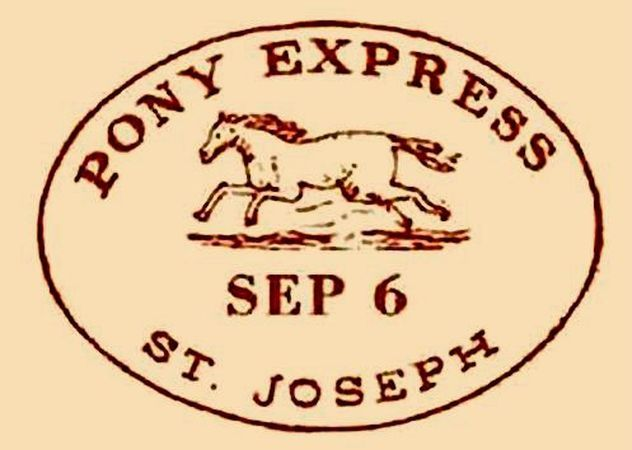
- Congress Hall, Pony Express office

- Location within California Location within the United States
- 32.7551°N 117.1977°W
- Location: 4016 Wallace, San Diego, California

History
- Built: 1867

Site notes
- Architect(s): George Dewitt Clinton; Washington Robinson
- Architectural style: Old Western Wood

California Historical Landmark
- Designated: December 6, 1932
- Reference no.: 66

Congress Hall was a historical wooden building in San Diego, California, built in 1867 near 4016 Wallace Street, which was once the Fandango Restaurant. The Congress Hall site is California Historical Landmark No. 66, listed on December 6, 1932. Congress Hall was a Pony Express Station from 1860 to 1861. It was for a time Robertson's saloon and billiard parlor. Congress Hall was built by George Dewitt Clinton and Washington, and Robinson. An unrelated historical marker is at the site of the former building in Old Town, San Diego. Vincent Llucia purchased the building in 1870 and moved it to a nearby site across the plaza at 4016 Wallace, Old Town, San Diego, now Bara Bara Saloon, at the southwest Corner of Calhoun Street and Wallace Street. Prior to that, 4016 Wallace had the ruins of a 1830 house that was owned by Rosario Aguilar, and later Luis Serrano. The crumbling ruins were removed and Congress Hall moved to this lot. In 1884 Llucia converted the building to a US Post Office. Vincent Llucia and his son Vincent P.D. Llucia became the postmasters. The Congress Hall building was demolished in 1939.

== See also ==
- California Historical Landmarks in San Diego County
