= Presidio Park =

Historic park in San Diego, California

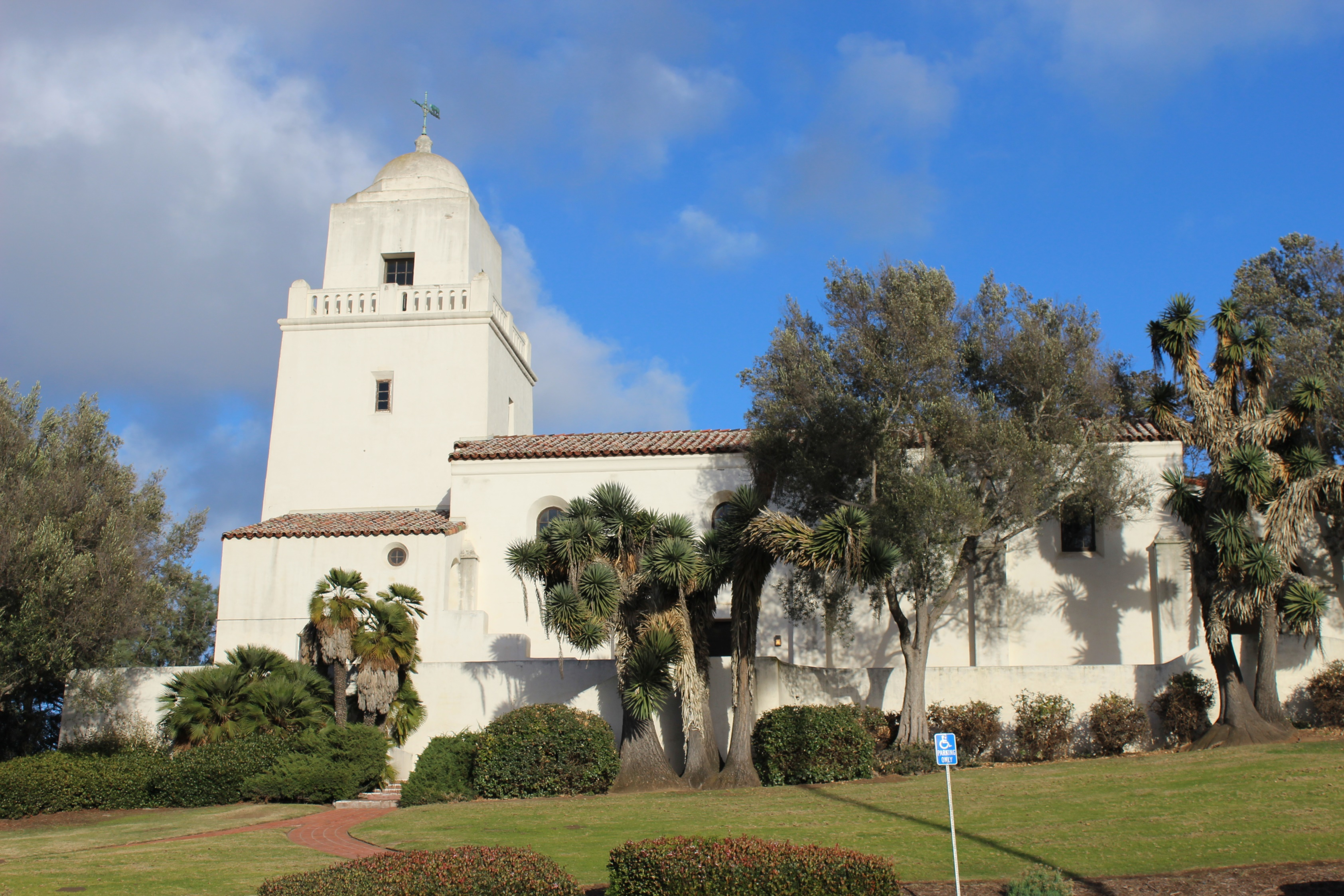
- The Junípero Serra Museum in Presidio Park

- Location within San Diego Location within California Location within the United States
- Location: San Diego, California
- Coordinates: 32°45′32″N 117°11′35″W
- Governing body: City of San Diego

California Historical Landmark
- Official name: Serra Palm
- Reference no.: 67

Presidio Park is a city historic park in San Diego, California. It is the site where the San Diego Presidio and the San Diego Mission, the first European settlements in what is now the West Coast of the United States, were founded in 1769.

The park encompasses about 40 acres (16 ha) and offers views of the city, the San Diego River valley, and the Pacific Ocean. The grounds are open to the public. The facilities can be used for weddings and other special events.

== History ==
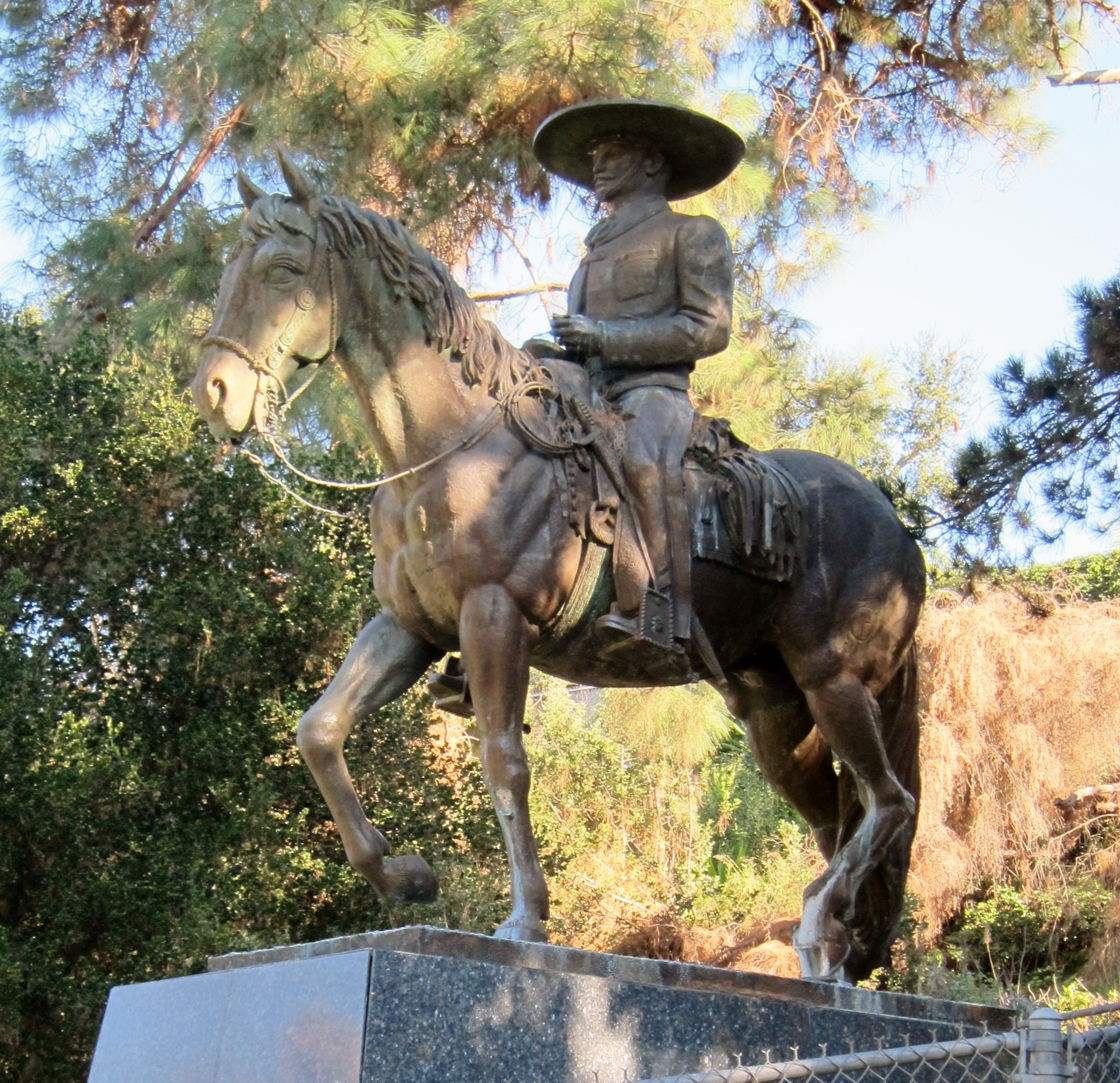
The Vaquero Monument, donated to the city by Mexican President Gustavo Díaz Ordaz in 1970, honors the 200th anniversary of the founding of Presidio of San Diego.

In 1773, the mission moved a few miles upriver, while the fort remained on Presidio Hill. The presidio had been established to protect against Indian attacks and foreign invasions. As the need for such protection disappeared, people preferred to live in Old Town at the foot of the hill, and the fort was gradually abandoned. It was in ruins by 1835. The United States Army set up Fort Stockton in the old fort in the Mexican–American War. Fort Stockton at Presidio Park is California Historical Landmark No. 54.

In 1907, George Marston, a wealthy department store owner and civic leader, bought Presidio Hill with the aim of preserving the historic site. Unable to attract city funding, Marston built a private park (planned by architect John Nolan) including the Serra Museum (designed by architect William Templeton Johnson) in 1925. Marston donated the park to the city in 1929.

The spot in the park where Junípero Serra planted a palm tree when he first arrived in 1769 was declared a California Historical Landmark. Otherwise, no historical structures remain in Presidio Park today. The site is occasionally used for archaeological excavations. A fenced-off area encloses the foundations of the chapel, walls, and other historical sites.

== Junípero Serra Museum ==
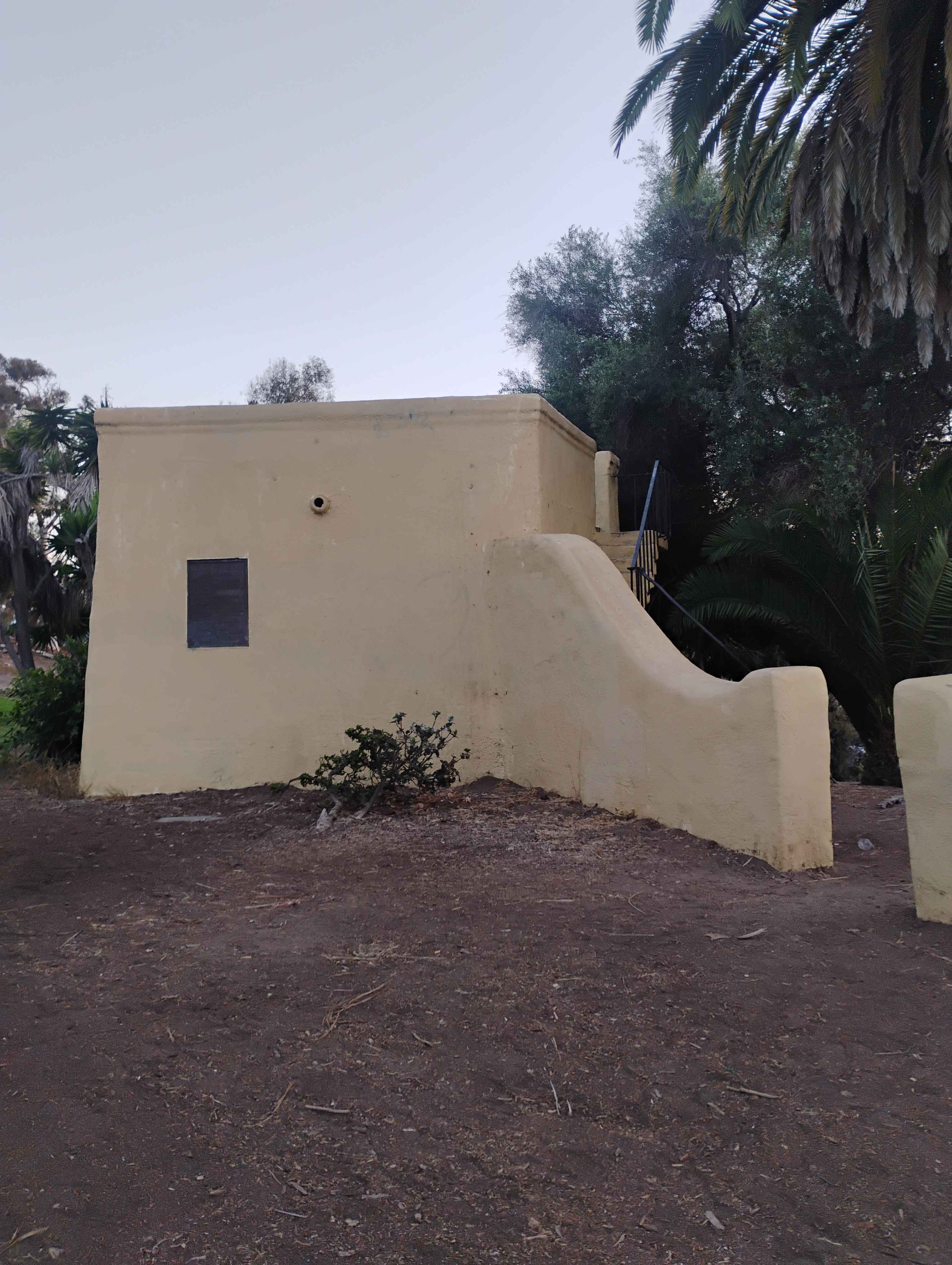
Witches Tower (also the Pattie Memorial) on the outskirts of the park, as seen approaching from the museum.

The Junípero Serra Museum is operated by the San Diego Historical Society and features displays about the city's founding. Built in 1925, the Serra Museum, with its Mission architecture, is sometimes erroneously called the Presidio.

The Junípero Serra Museum exhibits archeological finds, historic objects, and reference materials related to Spanish colonization and the early history of California and provides educational programs about the Spanish, Mexican and indigenous heritage of the San Diego region.

The Serra Museum was the original home of the San Diego Historical Society, founded in 1929 by philanthropist George Marston. The organization, renamed the San Diego History Center, relocated to Balboa Park in 1982.

== See also ==
- List of parks in San Diego
- California Historical Landmarks in San Diego County
