= Thomas L. Smith =

American prospector and mountain man

Peg Leg Smith Monument
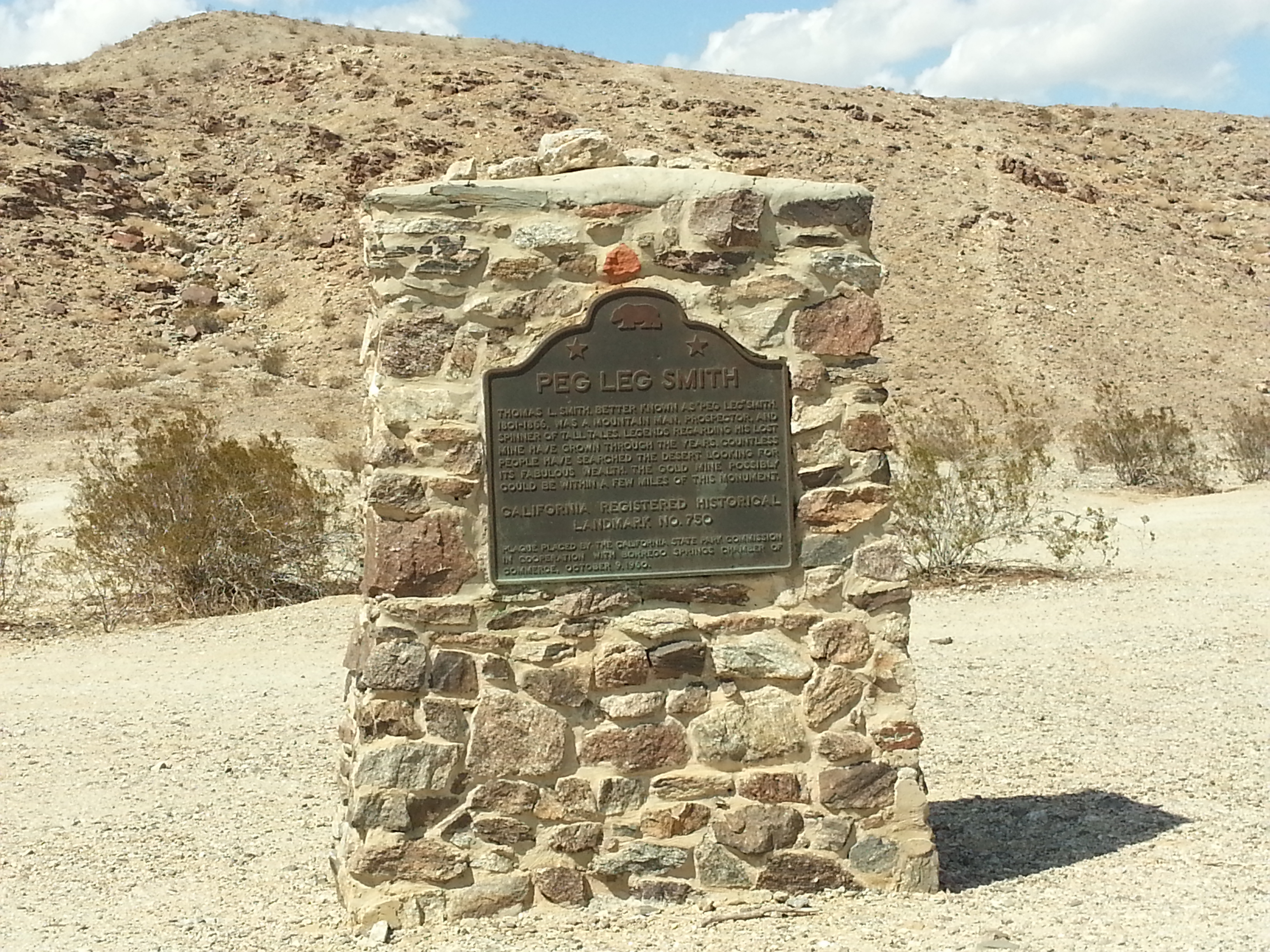
- Peg Leg Smith Monument

- Location within California Location within the United States
- 33.2961°N 116.2981°W
- Location: Henderson Canyon Road; Anza-Borrego Desert State Park

California Historical Landmark
- Designated: October 11, 1960
- Reference no.: 750

Thomas Long "Pegleg" Smith (October 10, 1801 – October 1866) was a mountain man who served as a guide for many early expeditions into the American Southwest and who helped explore parts of New Mexico. He is also known as a fur trapper, prospector, and horse thief. The Peg Leg Smith Monument is a historical site in Anza-Borrego Desert State Park, California. The Monument site is California Historical Landmark No. 452, listed on October 11, 1960.

== Life ==
Smith was born in Crab Orchard, Kentucky. He ran away from home as a teenager to work on a flatboat on the Mississippi River until reaching St. Louis, Missouri, where he began working for John Jacob Astor as a fur trapper with other mountain men such as Kit Carson, Jim Bridger, and Milton Sublette.

Smith later accompanied Alexandre Le Grand's expedition into New Mexico as a scout, later learning several Indian languages. During the expedition, he was shot in the right knee by an Indian, and the wound and resulting infection forced the amputation of his right leg below the knee. It is said that he performed the operation himself, almost completing it before passing out from blood loss and shock. He then had to use a wooden leg from which he earned the nickname of Pegleg Smith. He would remove his leg and use it to defend himself during fights. Following the expedition, Smith became a successful fur trapper despite his handicap, later relearning how to maintain his balance while riding a horse.

By 1840, the fur trade was in decline, so Smith focused on stealing horses from the large Mexican haciendas. In one incident, Smith guided around 150 Ute Indians under the leadership of Walkara across the Sierra Nevada, stealing several hundred horses from Mexican ranchers. He joined Jim Beckwourth and "Old Bill" Williams to establish the largest horse theft operation in the Southwest, until authorities eventually forced the gang to break up in the late 1840s.

Smith traveled to the Chocolate Mountains (and possibly the Borrego Badlands), but he was driven out of the area by local tribes. He then began claiming that he had discovered a large amount of gold-bearing quartz, and he sold maps and shares in a fictitious mine known as the Lost Pegleg Mine until his death in a San Francisco hospital in 1866.

Another account states that Smith claimed that he found small, dark, heavy stones atop three "low black buttes" "near a volcano" in the desert west of the Chocolates in 1829. He claimed that he came upon the site while looking for fresh water on a journey from the Colorado River to the Pacific coast. He claimed that he took some samples to Los Angeles, where the stones were assayed as gold nuggets covered in desert varnish.

== In popular culture ==
Each year the Pegleg Smith Liars Contest is held at California's Anza-Borrego Desert State Park.

Actor Ralph Sanford portrayed Smith in "The Lost Pegleg Mine" (1952), the fourth episode of the syndicated television anthology series, Death Valley Days, hosted by Stanley Andrews. In the story line, Peter Trumble (Gil Frye) (1918–2000) is competing with Jeanne DeCourcey (Gloria Eaton) in a race to find the lost mine.

Smith appears in the 1995 computer game Oregon Trail II as the owner and operator of Smith's Trading Post near Big Hill and the Idaho/Wyoming Border. Travelers can purchase supplies from his post and interact with him on the trail nearby.

== See also ==
- California Historical Landmarks in San Diego County
