= El Vado =

Historical Landmark in San Diego, California, United States

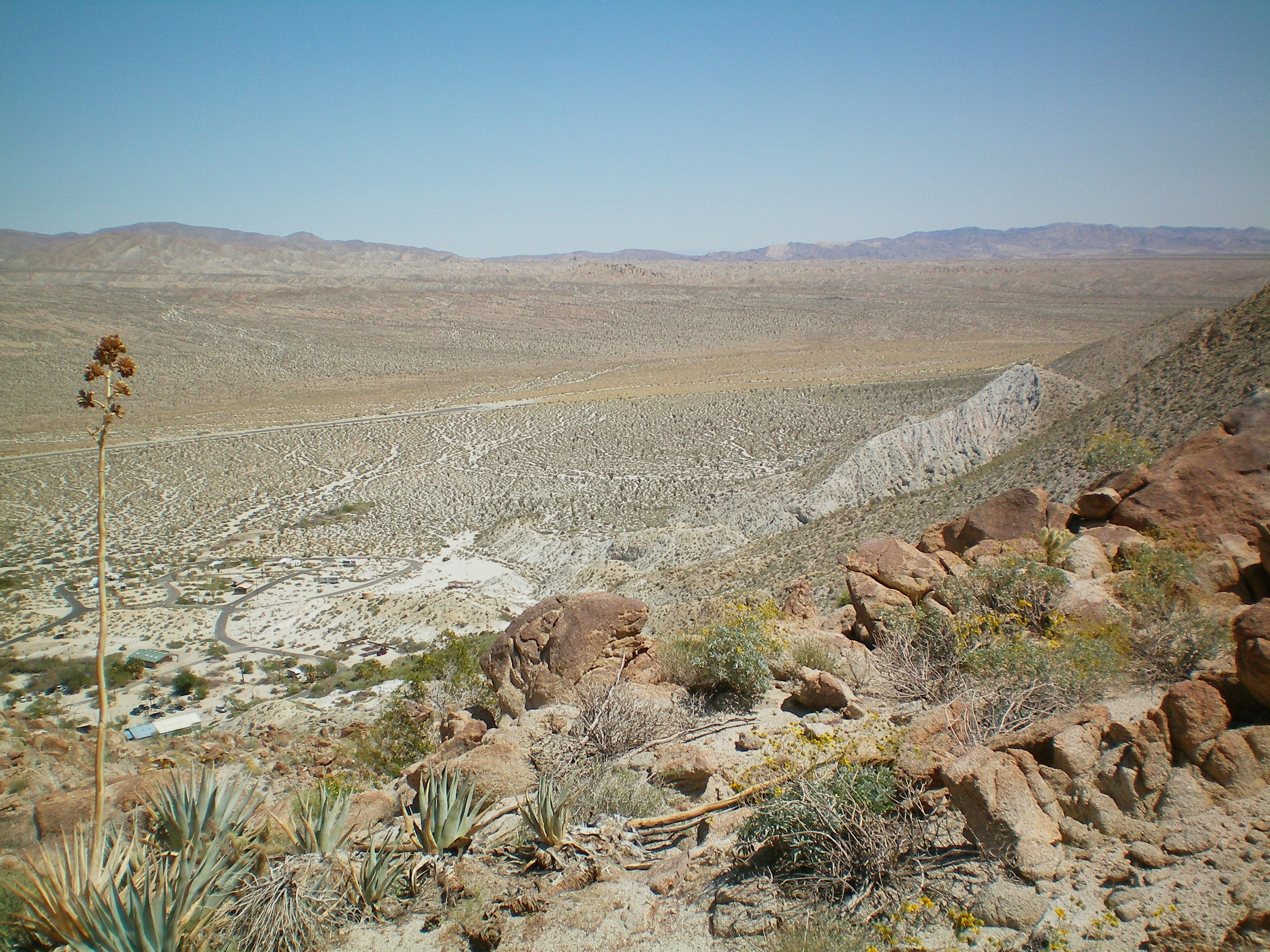
- Anza Borrego near the El Vado campsite

- Location within California Location within the United States
- 33.30168°N 116.3843°W
- Location: Borrego Springs, California; Anza-Borrego Desert State Park

History
- Built: December 20–22, 1775.

California Historical Landmark
- Designated: March 3, 1958
- Reference no.: 634

El Vado campsite (transl. the Ford on the Anza Trail) in the Borrego Valley, Borrego Springs, California, in San Diego County, is a California Historical Landmark No. 634 listed on March 3, 1958. The El Vado campsite was a desert camp for the Spanish Commander Juan Bautista de Anza and Father Francisco Garcés expedition of 1775 and 1776. The expedition camped for three days and two nights from December 20 to 22, 1775. At the campsite the expedition rested and watered its stock of mules, cattle, and horses.

The expedition passed through the Imperial Valley then though the Colorado Desert, now Anza-Borrego Desert State Park. The expedition's goal was to start Spanish missions in California and presidio forts though Las Californias to San Francisco Bay. The expedition route is now the Juan Bautista de Anza National Historic Trail.

A historical marker is near the campsite in the desert on Horse Camp Road and Borrego Springs Road in Anza-Borrego Desert State Park. The marker was placed there by the California State Parks Commission working with the Kiwanis Club of Borrego Springs.

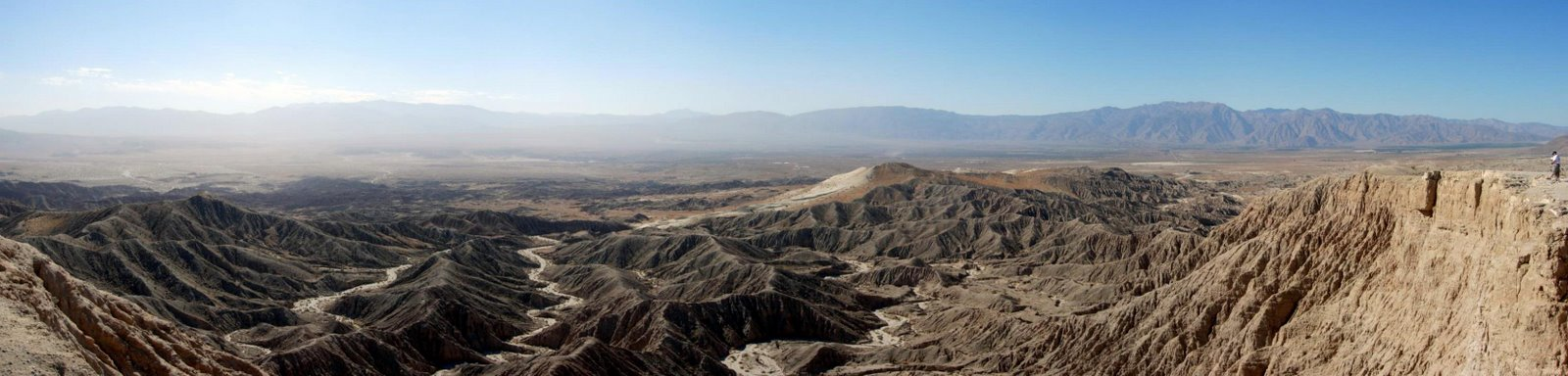
Panoramic view from Font's Point westward over Borrego Valley to the Laguna Mountains

== See also ==
- California Historical Landmarks in San Diego County
- Borrego Valley groundwater basin
- Box Canyon (Borrego Springs, California)
