= Borrego Sink =

Historical Landmark in San Diego, California, United States

Borrego Sink San Gregorio campsite
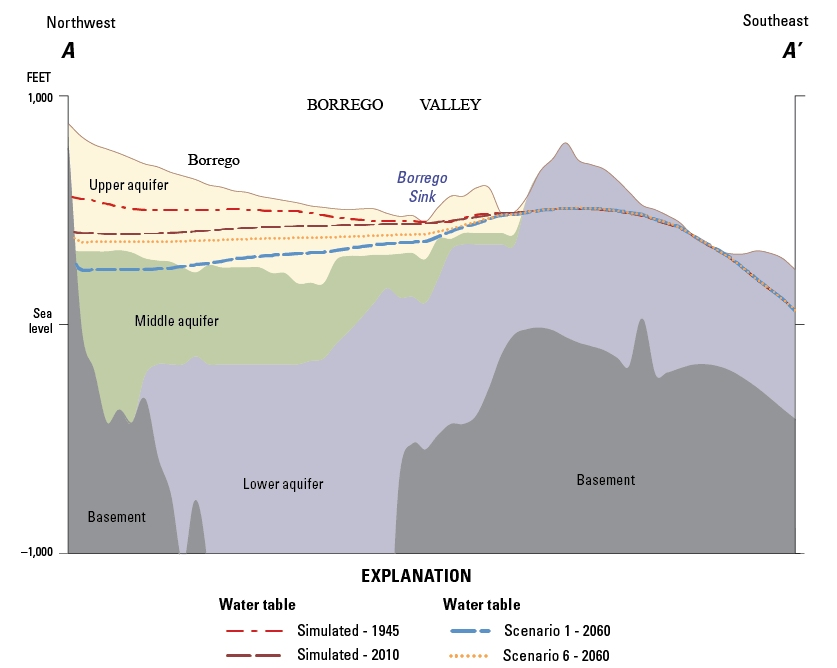
- Borrego Sink and Borrego Valley; Groundwater Table

- Location within California Location within the United States
- 33.222°N 116.270°W
- Location: Borrego Sink; Anza-Borrego Desert State Park

History
- Built: 1775

California Historical Landmark
- Designated: February 16, 1959
- Reference no.: 673

San Gregorio campsite at the Borrego Sink in the Borrego Valley, Borrego Springs, California, in San Diego County, is a California Historical Landmark No. 673 listed on February 16, 1959. The San Gregorio campsite was a desert camp for the Spanish Commander Juan Bautista de Anza's expedition of 1775 and 1776. The expedition passed through the Imperial Valley then through the Colorado Desert, now Anza-Borrego Desert State Park. The expedition's goal was to start Spanish missions in California and presidio forts through Las Californias to San Francisco Bay. The expedition route is now the Juan Bautista de Anza National Historic Trail.

At the Anza San Gregorio campsite in the Colorado Desert, the Anza Expeditions stopped and dug deep wells in a dry wash to get water for the expedition and its stock of mules, cattle, and 140 horses. The underground water at Borrego Sink comes when Coyote Creek is flowing, Coyote Creek runs down the valley into Borrego Sink. During rain storms the Borrego Sink can turn in to a swallow lake or a vast mud flat. Coyote Creek is the only reliably perennial creek in Anza-Borrego Desert State Park. Coyote Creek is 18 miles (29 km) long and runs from the city of Anza, California to Borrego Sink. Borrego Sink is at an elevation of 455 feet (138 meters) at the low spot of the Borrego Valley. Coyote Creek supports Desert bighorn sheep and a desert riparian zone. Coyote Creek is divided up into three zones Upper Willows, Middle Willows, and Lower Willows. The Coyote Creek riparian zone supports: narrow-leaf willow (Salix exigua), Fremont cottonwood (Populus fremontii), western sycamore (Platanus racemosa), arrowweed (Tessaria sericea), white alder (Alnus rhombifolia), mulefat (Baccharis glutinosa), honey mesquite (Prosopis glandulosa), and tamarisk (Tamarix ramosissima an invasive species). In a few spots palms (Washingtonia filifera) grow. Coyote Creek riparian zone supports seasonal birds: Bell's vireo, Black-crowned night heron, green-backed heron, common yellowthroat, American kestrel, yellow-breasted chat, black-tailed gnatcatcher, blue grosbeak, downy woodpecker, willow flycatcher, yellow warbler, prairie falcon, red-shouldered hawk, and the black-shouldered kite. The Cahuilla tribe lived along Coyote Creek in the past.

A Historical marker is near the campsite in the desert at Borrego Sink, 3 Miles Southeast of Palm Canyon and Peg Leg Roads in Anza-Borrego Desert State Park.

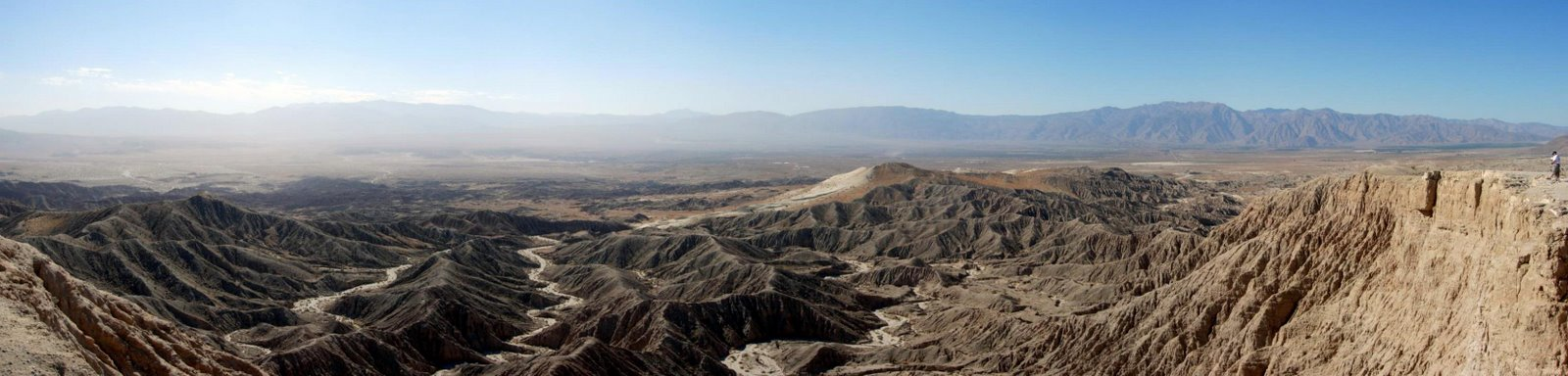
Panoramic view from Font's Point westward over Borrego Valley to the Laguna Mountains, Borrego Sink is in the bottom of the valley

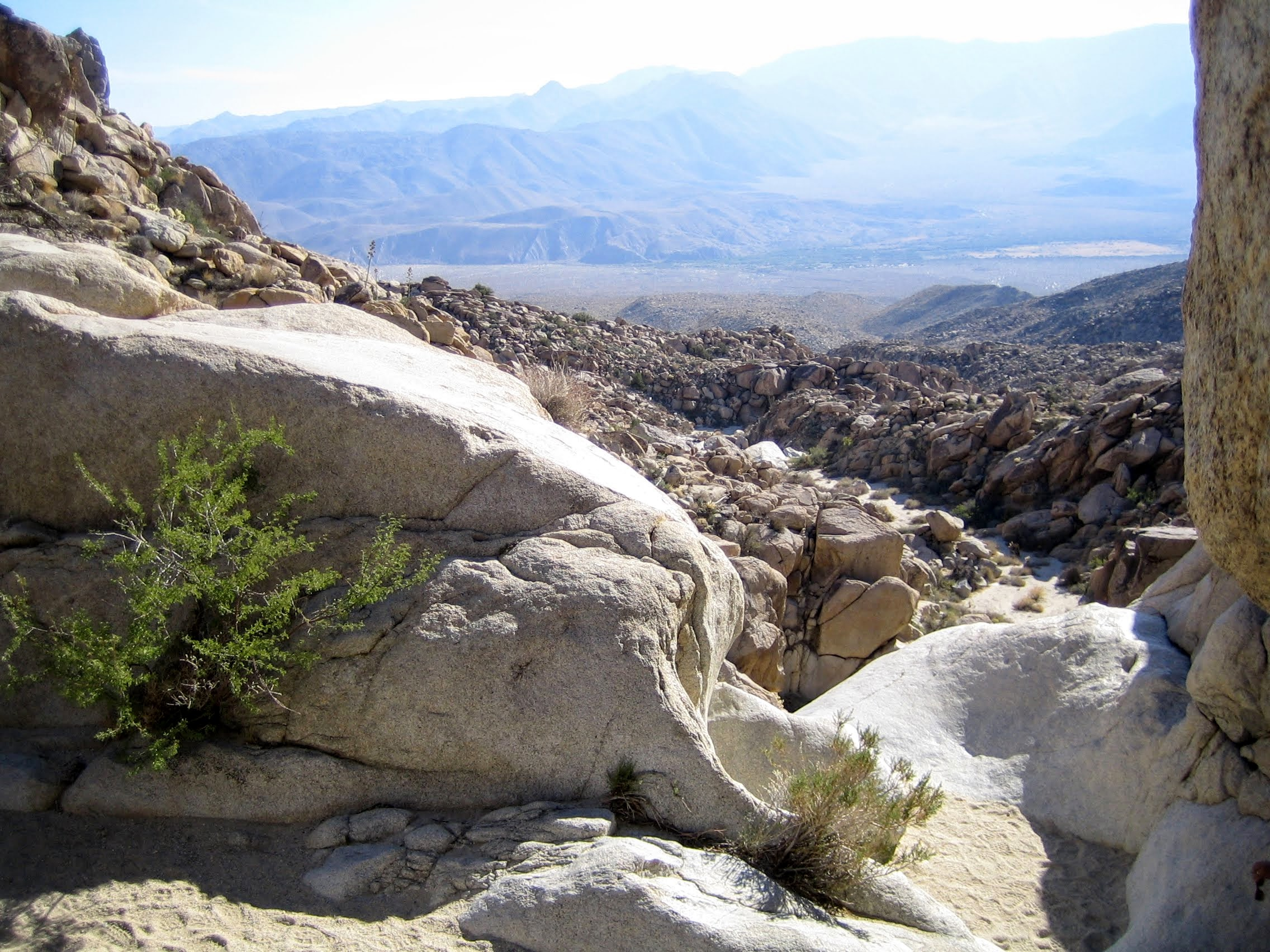
Borrego Valley and Borrego Sink at the low spot

== See also ==
- California Historical Landmarks in San Diego County
- Borrego Valley groundwater basin
- Box Canyon (Borrego Springs, California)
