= Box Canyon (Borrego Springs, California) =

Historical Landmark in San Diego, California, United States

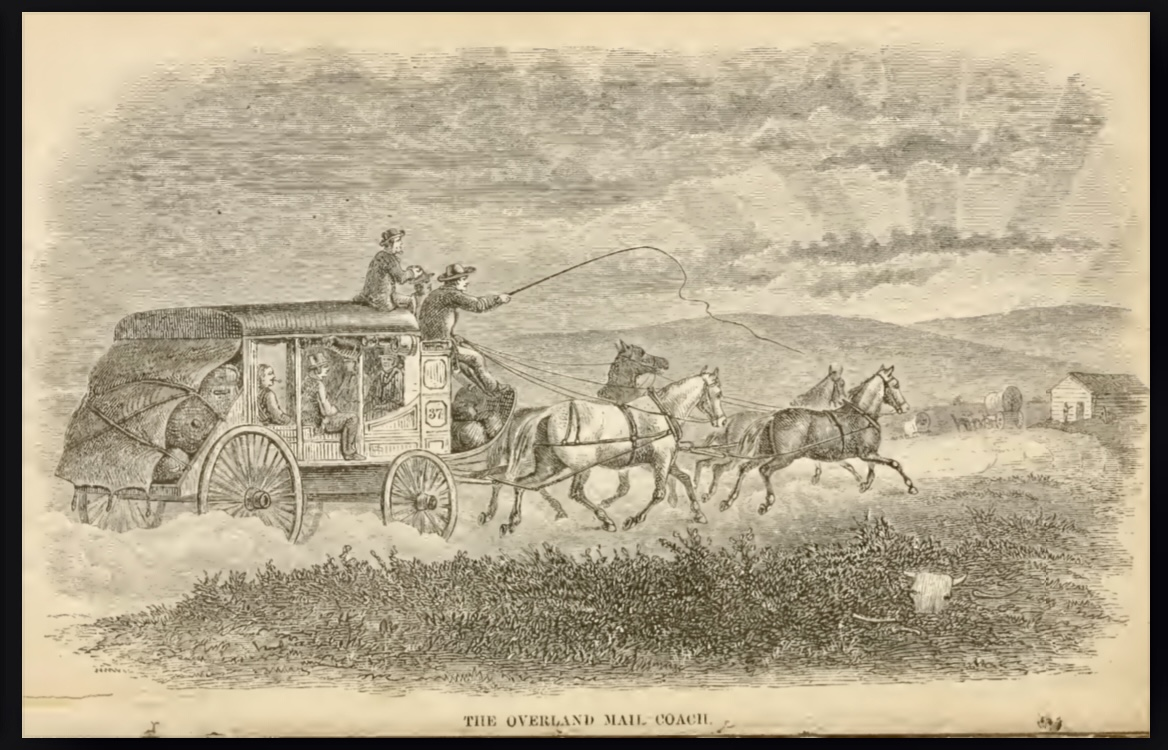
- Overland Mail Coach, used Box Canyon from 1857 to 1861

- Location within California Location within the United States
- 33.015°N 116.442°W
- Location: CA 78, Anza-Borrego Desert State Park

History
- Built: 1847

California Historical Landmark
- Designated: September 11, 1950
- Reference no.: 472

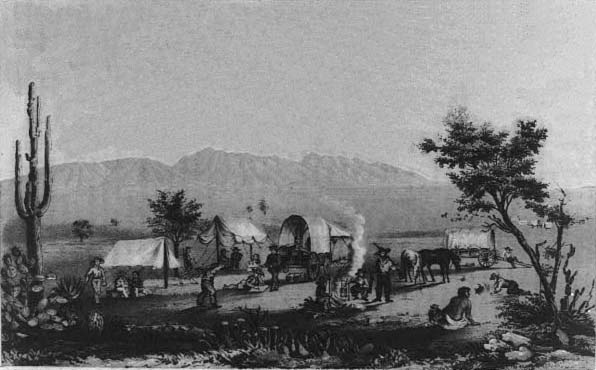
An American wagon train on the Southern Emigrant Trail

Box Canyon in Anza-Borrego Desert State Park in San Diego County, is a California Historical Landmark No. 472 listed on September 11, 1950. Box Canyon is a desert canyon and mountain pass on the Historic Southern Emigrant Trail. The US troops under General Stephen Watts Kearny and with US scout Kit Carson found Box Canyon and its pass in October 1846. On January 19, 1847, Kearny was the leader of a wagon train with Colonel Philip St. George Cooke and the Mormon Battalion that used Box Canyon to head west. The group used hand tool to widen and clear Box Canyon so the covered wagons could pass. The road through Box Canyon became the first road into Southern Alta California.

The Butterfield Overland Mail Route passed through Box Canyon, also called the Kearney Trail. Overland routed was called, Second Division's route, traveled from Fort Yuma to Warners Pass and followed the Sonora Road, an old Spanish and Mexican trail from Sonora, México, to San Diego. The Butterfield Overland route ran from 1857 to 1861. Box Canyon

A Historical marker is on Box Canyon road, also called the old road, and the Sonora, Colorado River road, now County Road S2, at Milepost 25.7, 8.6 Miles South of California State Route 78 in Anza-Borrego Desert State Park. The closest city is Julian, California, address of marker is 12001 County Hwy S2., also called the Great Southern Overland Stage Route.

== See also ==
- California Historical Landmarks in San Diego County
- Borrego Sink
