= Casa de Carrillo House =

Historical Landmark in San Diego, California, United States

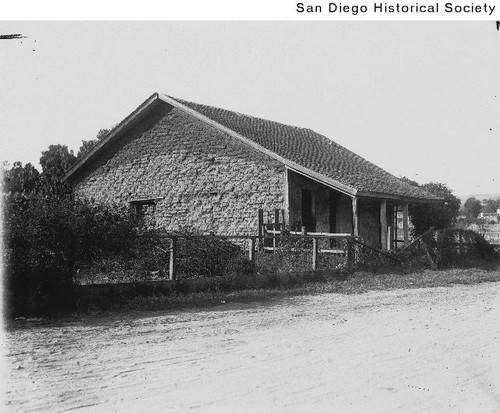
- Casa de Carrillo House in 1908

- Location within California Location within the United States
- 32.756°N 117.196°W
- Location: Presidio Hills Golf Course; San Diego, California

History
- Built: 1821

Site notes
- Architectural style: Adobe

California Historical Landmark
- Designated: December 6, 1932
- Reference no.: 74

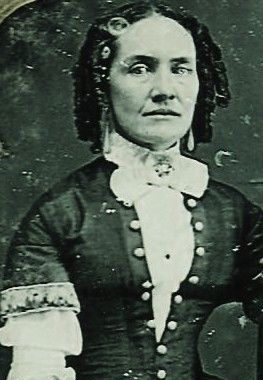
María Ygnacia López de Carrillo lived in the Carrillo House from 1821 to 1836.

Casa de Carrillo House in San Diego, California, in San Diego County, is the oldest residence in San Diego. The Casa de Carrillo House was built in 1821 by Presidio of San Diego Comandante Francisco María Ruiz (1754–1839) next to the pear orchard he had planted in 1808. The adobe house was later occupied by his close relative Joaquín Carrillo and Joaquín's large family. Joaquín's daughter Josefa Carrillo scandalously eloped from the home and sailed to Chile with Henry Delano Fitch in April 1829; they were later reconciled with her father. Francisco Ruiz died in 1839. When Joaquín Carrillo died afterward, his son Ramon Carrillo sold the house and land to Lorenzo Soto. The house and land were then sold a few times. The house was in poor condition when sold in 1932 to George Marston and associates. The house was restored, and Marston donated the house and land to the City of San Diego. The City of San Diego turned the house and land into the Presidio Hills Golf Course.

The Casa de Carrillo House is California Historical Landmark No. 74, listed on December 6, 1932. A California Historical marker is at the Old Town, San Diego, Presidio Hills Golf Course, NE of Juan Street on Wallace Street. The Marker was placed there in 1994 by the State Department of Parks and Recreation working with the San Diego City Department of Parks and Recreation and Squibob Chapter, E Clampus Vitus.

== See also ==
- California Historical Landmarks in San Diego County
- El Campo Santo
- Carrillo family of California
- María Ygnacia López de Carrillo
