= Adobe Chapel of The Immaculate Conception =

Historic house in San Diego, California, US

Chapel of the Immaculate Conception
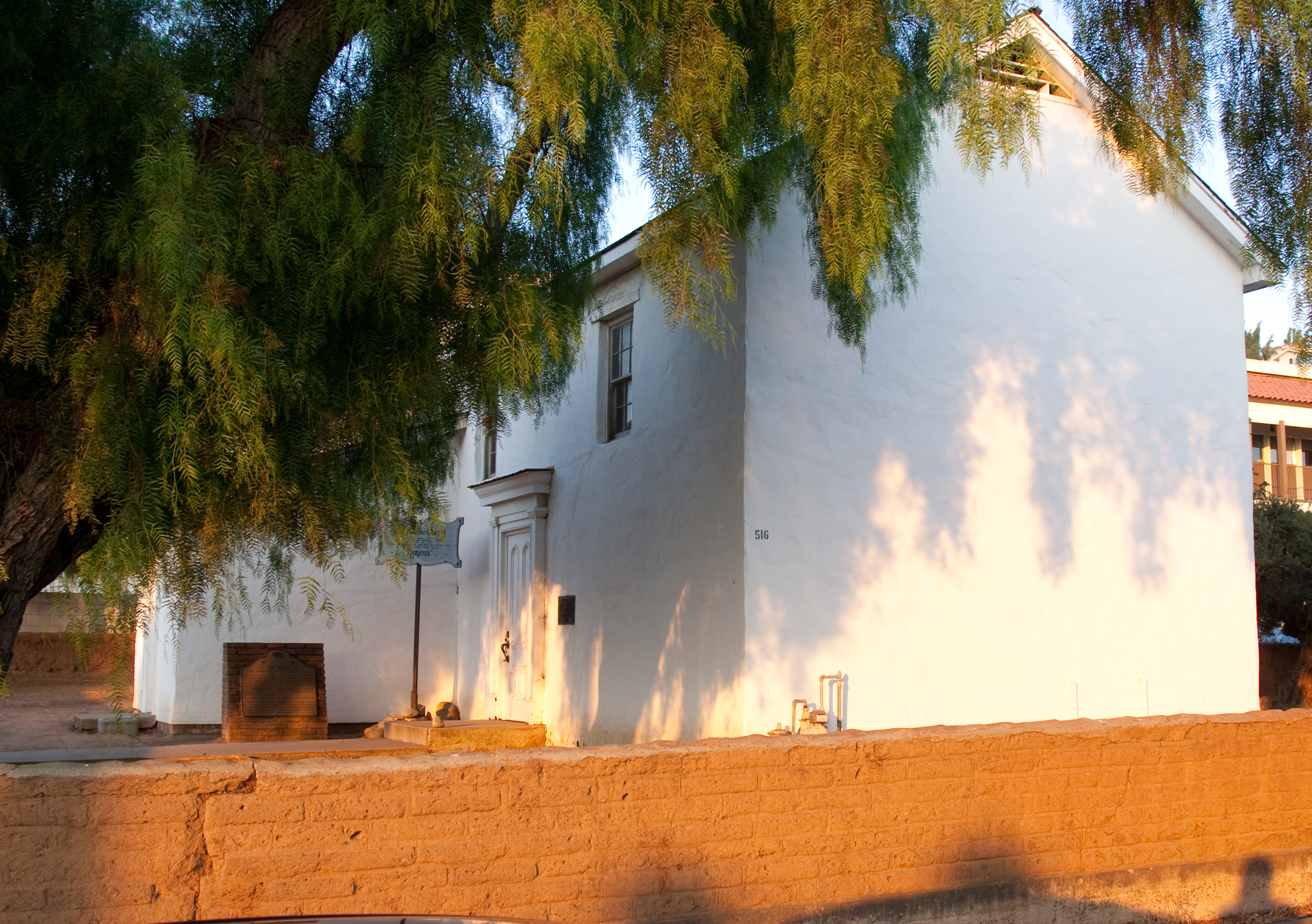
- Chapel of the Immaculate Conception

- Location within California Location within the United States
- 32.7516°N 117.1944°W
- Location: San Diego, California

History
- Built: 1850

Site notes
- Architect: Franciscans
- Architectural style: Adobe

California Historical Landmark
- Designated: March 6, 1935
- Reference no.: 49

Chapel of the Immaculate Conception in San Diego, California, is a California Historical Landmark No. 49 listed on March 6, 1935. It was built in 1850 as the adobe house of John Brown. The house was converted to a church building by Don José Aguirre in 1858. From 1866 to 1907 missionary Father Antonio D. Ubach was parish priest at the Chapel of the Immaculate Conception. The Works Progress Administration rebuilt the Chapel of the Immaculate Conception in 1937. The Chapel of the Immaculate Conception is located at 3950 Conde Street in Old Town, San Diego.

A Historical Plaque was placed at the Chapel of the Immaculate Conception by the State Department of Parks and Recreation working with the City of San Diego; San Diego County Historical Days Association, and the Squibob Chapter of the E Clampus Vitus on September 24, 1988.

== See also ==
- California Historical Landmarks in San Diego County
- El Campo Santo
