= Casa de Cota =

Historical Landmark in San Diego, California, United States

- Location within California Location within the United States
- 32.752°N 117.196°W
- Location: San Diego, California

History
- Built: 1835

Site notes
- Architectural style: Adobe

California Historical Landmark
- Designated: December 6, 1932
- Reference no.: 75

Casa de Cota site in San Diego, California, is a California Historical Landmark No. 75, listed on December 6, 1932. The Casa de Cota House was built by Juan Cota or Ramon Cota at what is now Twiggs Street and Congress Street. The adobe house was removed by the United States Army to make room for an Army training camp used in World War II. The training camp was temporary and the site is now a parking lot.

A California Historical sign is at the Old Town, San Diego, parking lot.

== See also ==
- California Historical Landmarks in San Diego County
- El Campo Santo
