= Presidio of San Diego =

- San Diego Presidio
- U.S. National Register of Historic Places
- U.S. National Historic Landmark
- California Historical Landmark
- San Diego Historic Landmark
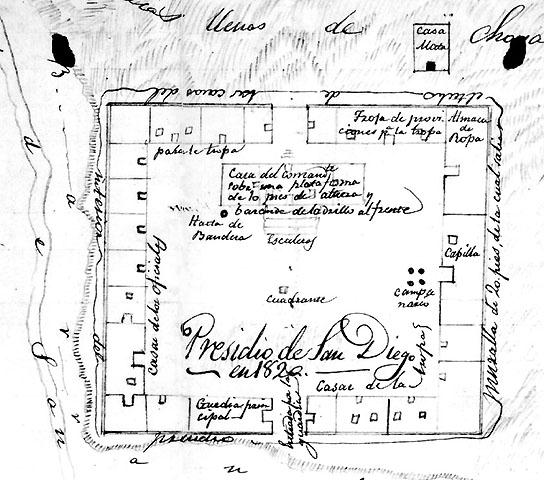
- 1820 map, Presidio of San Diego

- Location within San Diego Location within San Diego County, California Location within California Location within the United States
- Location: San Diego, California
- Coordinates: 32°45′31″N 117°11′36″W
- Built: 1769
- NRHP reference No.: 66000226
- CHISL No.: 59
- SDHL No.: 4

Significant dates
- Added to NRHP: October 15, 1966
- Designated NHL: October 9, 1960
- Designated CHISL: 1932
- Designated SDHL: February 29, 1968

El Presidio Real de San Diego (Royal Presidio of San Diego) is a historic fort in San Diego, California. It was established on May 14, 1769, by Gaspar de Portolá, leader of the first European land exploration of Alta California—at that time an unexplored northwestern frontier area of New Spain.

The presidio was the first permanent European settlement on the Pacific coast of the present-day United States. As the first of the presidios and Spanish missions in California, it was the base of operations for the Spanish colonization of California. The associated Mission San Diego de Alcalá later moved a few miles away.

Essentially abandoned by 1835, the site of the original Presidio lies on a hill within present-day Presidio Park, although no historic structures remain above ground. The San Diego Presidio was registered as a California Historical Landmark in 1932, then declared a National Historic Landmark in 1960.

== History ==
Prior to occupation by the Spanish, the site of the Presidio was home to the Kumeyaay people (called the Diegueños by the Spaniards).

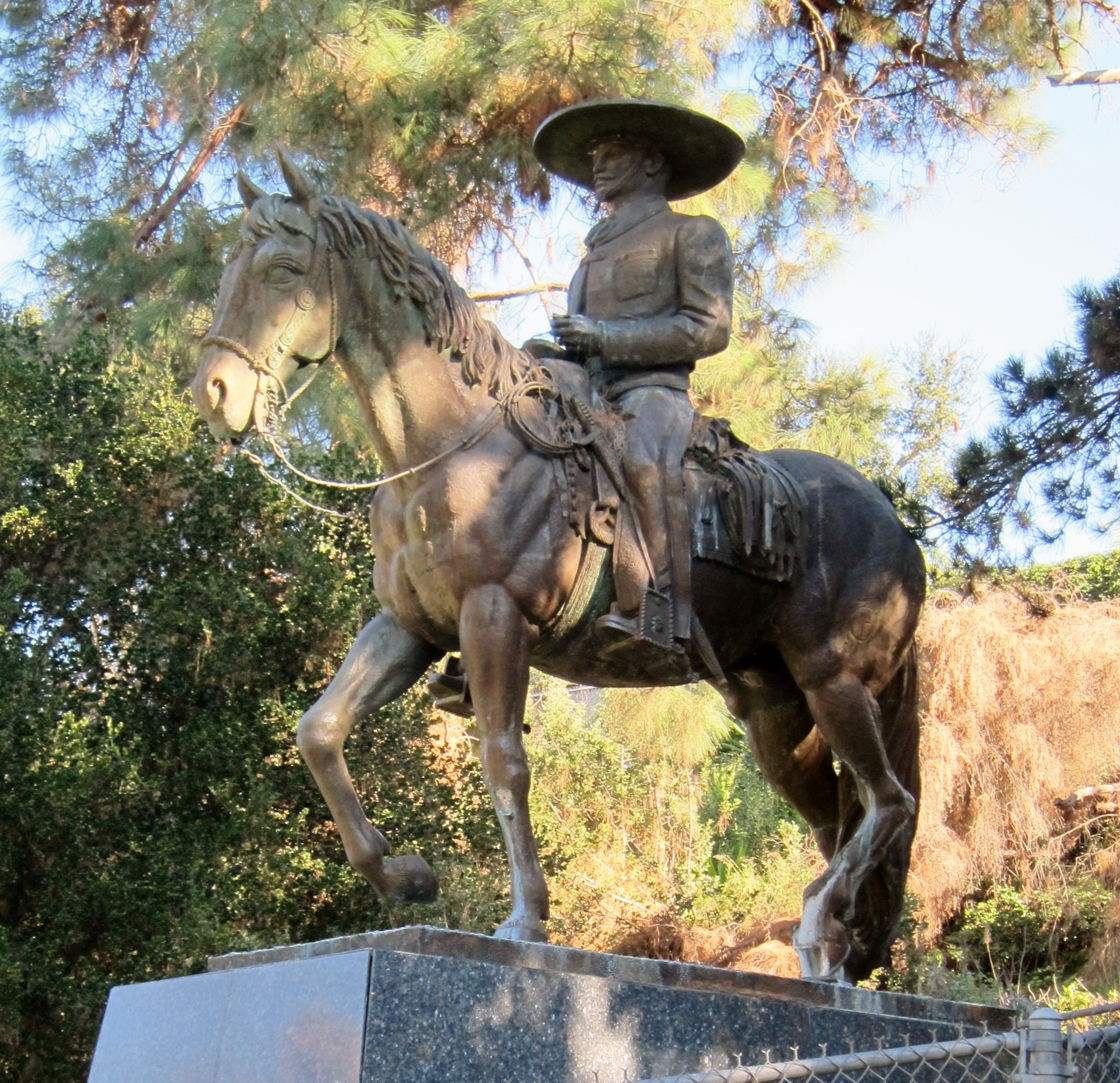
The Vaquero Monument, donated to the city by Mexican President Gustavo Díaz Ordaz in 1970, honors the 200th anniversary of the founding of Presidio of San Diego.

The first Europeans to explore San Diego Bay and its environs were members of the maritime expedition led by Juan Rodríguez Cabrillo in 1542. Sebastián Vizcaíno visited again in 1602, but no settlement was made until the fort was begun in May 1769. On July 16, 1769, Mission San Diego de Alcalá was established by Junípero Serra on Presidio Hill. The presidio had a commanding view of San Diego Bay and the Pacific Ocean, allowing the Spanish to see potential intruders.

Less than a month after the mission was established, a Kumeyaay uprising occurred; four Spaniards were wounded and a boy was killed. After the attack, the Spaniards built a stockade which was finished in March 1770. It included two bronze cannons: one pointed to the bay, the other to the nearby Indian village.

In 1773 and 1774, adobe structures were built to replace the temporary wood and brush huts. Later in 1774, the mission was moved a few miles up Mission Valley to separate the Kumeyaay from the influence of the presidial garrison. By 1783, there were 54 troops stationed at the presidio.

With Mexican independence in 1821, the presidio came under Mexican control, and was officially relinquished by the Spanish on April 20, 1822. From 1825–1829, it served as the Mexican governor's residence. The presidio was abandoned by 1835 and fell to ruins, because settlers preferred to live in the more accessible town—present-day Old Town San Diego State Historic Park—which developed at the foot of Presidio Hill.

== Preservation ==
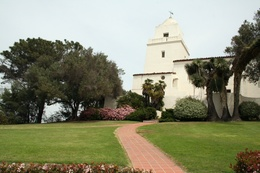
The Serra Museum in Presidio Park marks the original site of the Presidio and Mission

In 1907, George Marston, a wealthy department store owner, bought Presidio Hill with an interest to preserve the site. Unable to attract public funding, Marston built a private park in 1925 with the help of architect John Nolen. He also funded the Junípero Serra Museum, designed by William Templeton Johnson and built in 1928–1929 in Spanish Revival style architecture, to house and showcase the collection of the San Diego Historical Society (now the San Diego History Center). Serra Museum is sometimes incorrectly referred to as the Presidio, but in fact nothing remains of the original Presidio. Marston donated the park and museum to the city in 1929. Presidio Park is still owned by the city of San Diego; the Serra Museum is managed by the San Diego History Center.

No historical structures remain in Presidio Park today. The Presidio site is occasionally used for archaeological excavations.

There are additional photographs available.

== See also ==
- Commandants of the Presidio of San Diego
- Military Districts in Spanish California
- Pueblo de San Diego
