= El Campo Santo =

Historic cemetery in Industry, California

- El Campo Santo; Workman Family Cemetery
- U.S. National Register of Historic Places
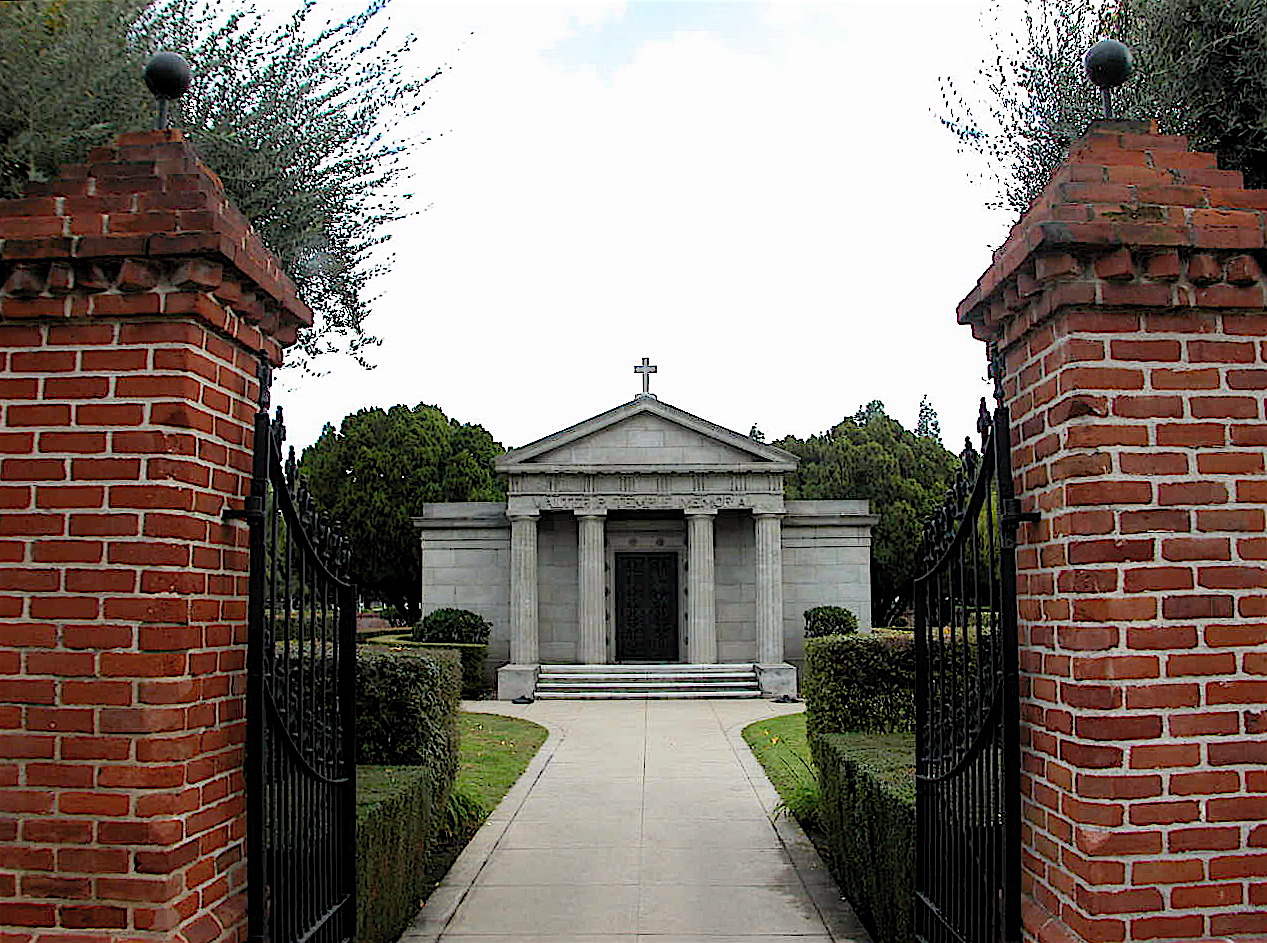
- The cemetery's mausoleum

- Location within the Los Angeles metropolitan area Location within California Location within the United States
- Location: 15415 E. Don Julian Rd., Industry, California
- Coordinates: 34°1′7″N 117°57′45″W
- NRHP reference No.: 74000520
- Added to NRHP: November 20, 1974

El Campo Santo (Spanish for "The Holy Field") is a cemetery located at the Workman and Temple Family Homestead Museum, 15415 East Don Julian Road, in City of Industry, California.

As one of the oldest private cemeteries in Southern California, El Campo Santo contains the remains of the pioneering Workman-Temple family as well as Pío Pico, the last governor of Alta California, and other prominent pioneer families. Within its low brick walls, the one-half acre cemetery features a Neoclassical mausoleum and a small cemetery plot surrounded by a Gothic Revival cast-iron fence.

In the early 1850s, the family of William Workman (1799–1867) established El Campo Santo, or "the sacred ground," as a cemetery solely for the use of their family. Along with a cemetery plot enclosed by an ornate cast-iron fence, they built a Gothic Revival brick chapel dedicated to Saint Nicholas by Bishop Thaddeus Amat of Los Angeles. Among the first to be buried here was William Workman's brother David Workman (1797–1855), who was killed in an accident while driving cattle to the gold fields in Northern California.

At the turn of the 20th century, the cemetery was abandoned and its brick chapel destroyed by fire. Walter P. Temple, a grandson of the Workmans, successfully filed a lawsuit preventing any further desecration of the cemetery. In 1917, he was able to purchase the cemetery and the surrounding 75 acres (300,000 m^{2}) and began restoration. In place of the chapel, however, he built a cast stone Neoclassical mausoleum and moved the remains of his family inside. In 1921, he also transferred the remains of Pío Pico and his wife, Ygnacia Alvarado de Pico, from old Calvary Cemetery on North Broadway in Downtown Los Angeles, which was being relocated, and had them entombed in the mausoleum.

The Workman Home and Family Cemetery are designated California Historical Landmark No. 874. The cemetery was placed on the National Register of Historic Places, No. 145, on November 20, 1974.

El Campo Santo is open to visitors through a self-guided tour described in the free brochure available at the museum office.

== Gallery ==
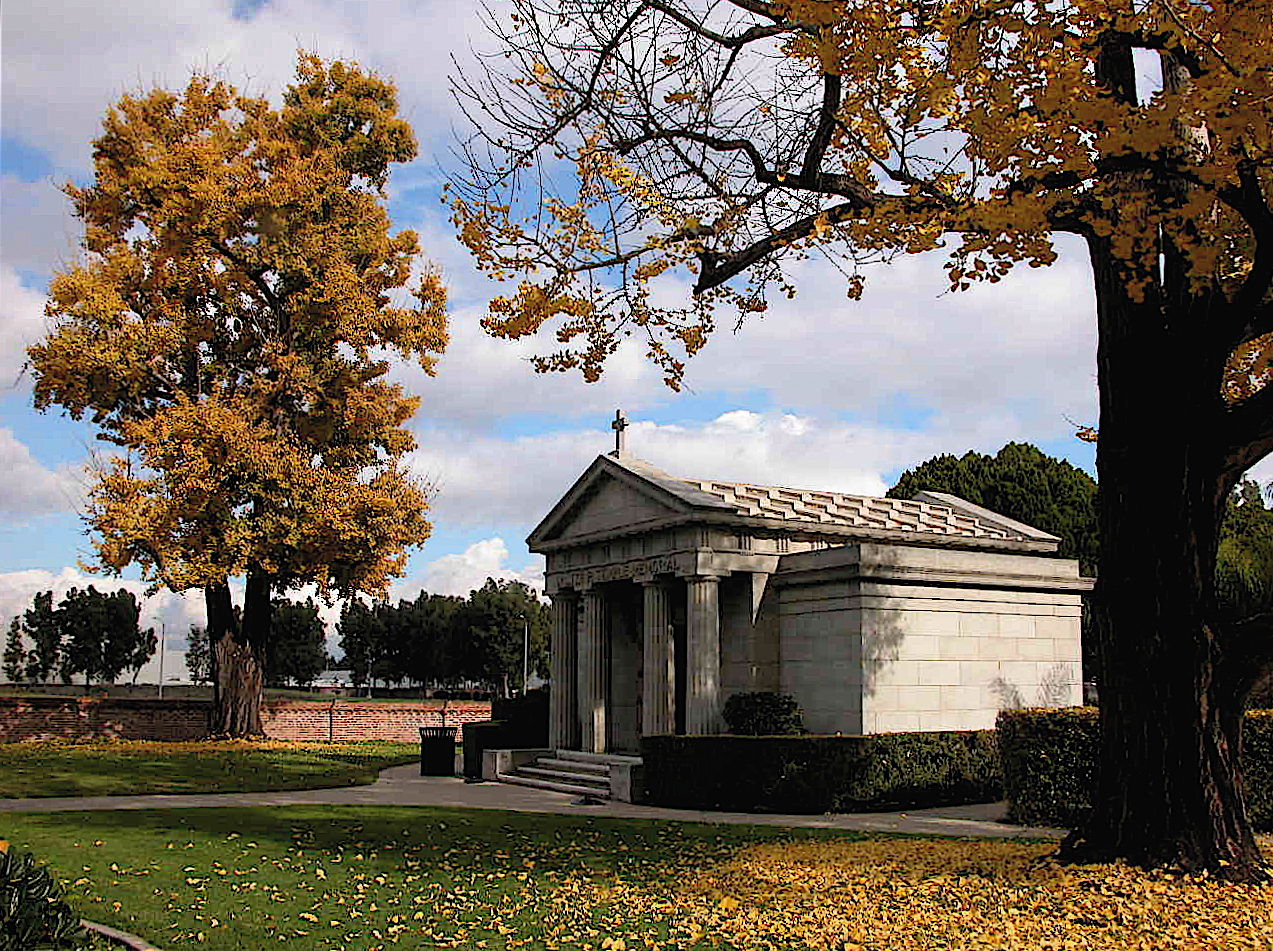
The mausoleum from the side

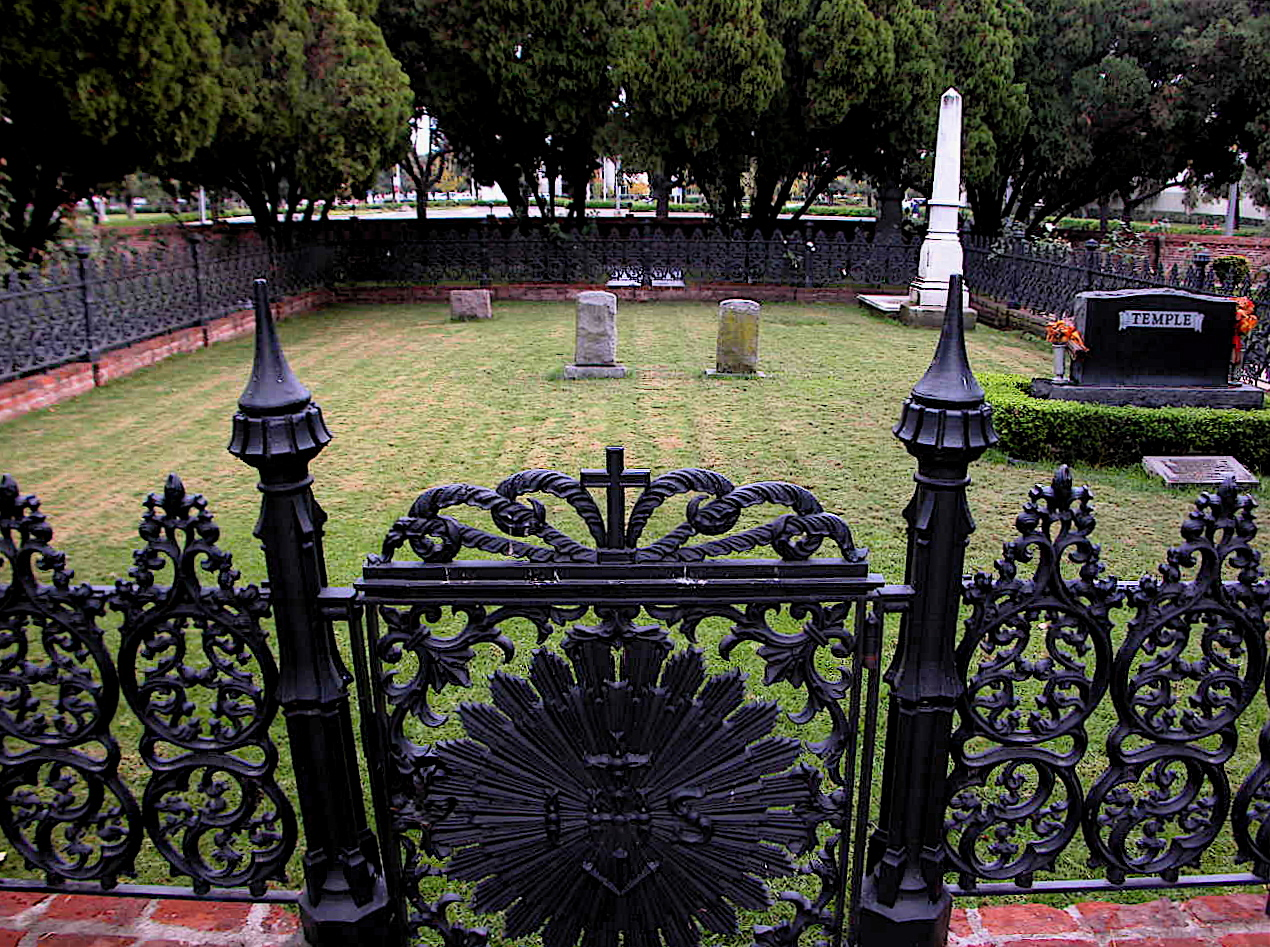
The cemetery plot
