= Great Fire of London =

1666 conflagration in England

Coordinates: 51.51°N 0.09°W

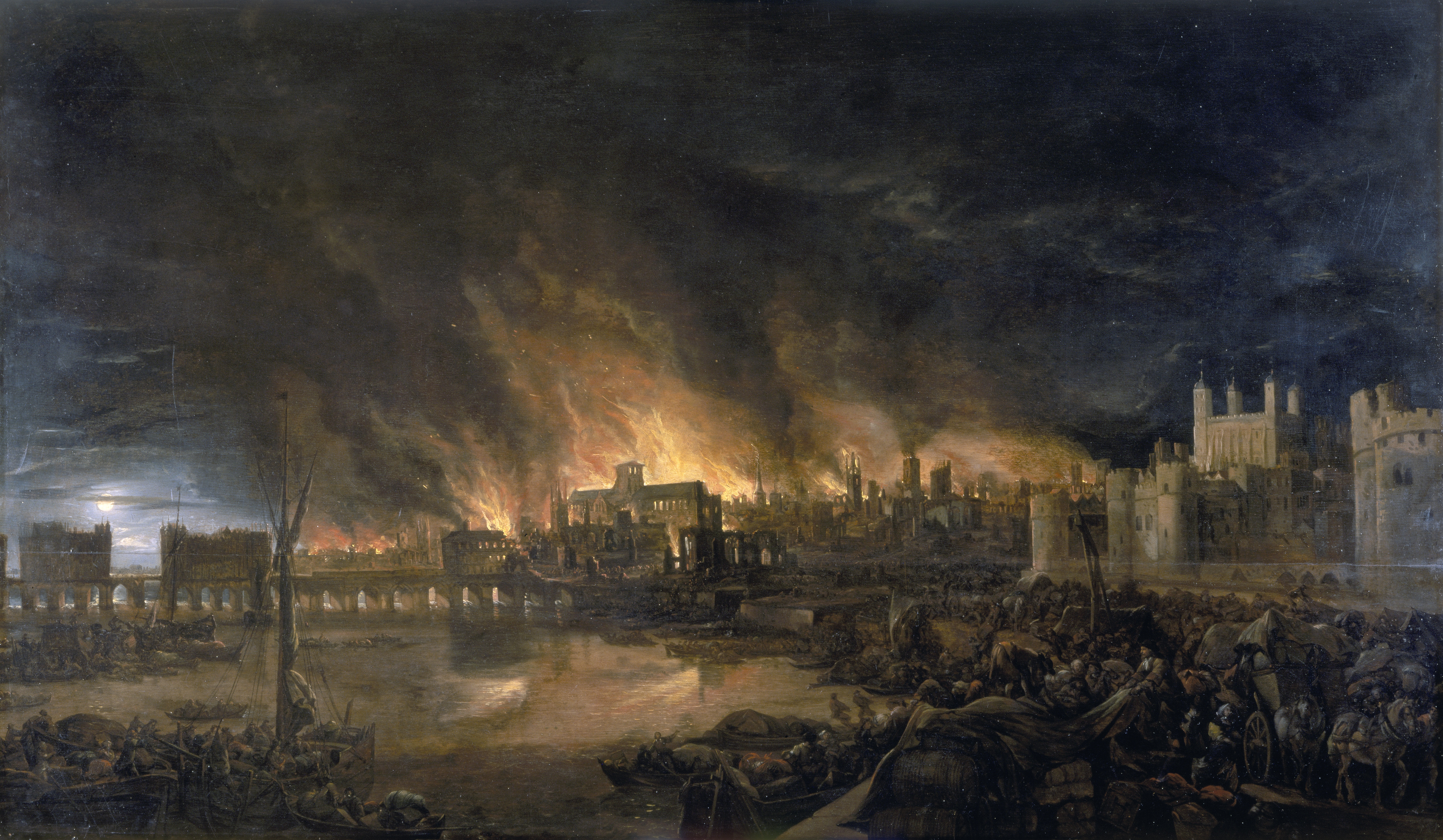
The Great Fire of London, depicted by an unknown painter (1675), as it would have appeared from a boat in the vicinity of Tower Wharf on the evening of Tuesday, 4 September 1666. To the left is London Bridge; to the right, the Tower of London. Old St Paul's Cathedral is in the distance, surrounded by the tallest flames.

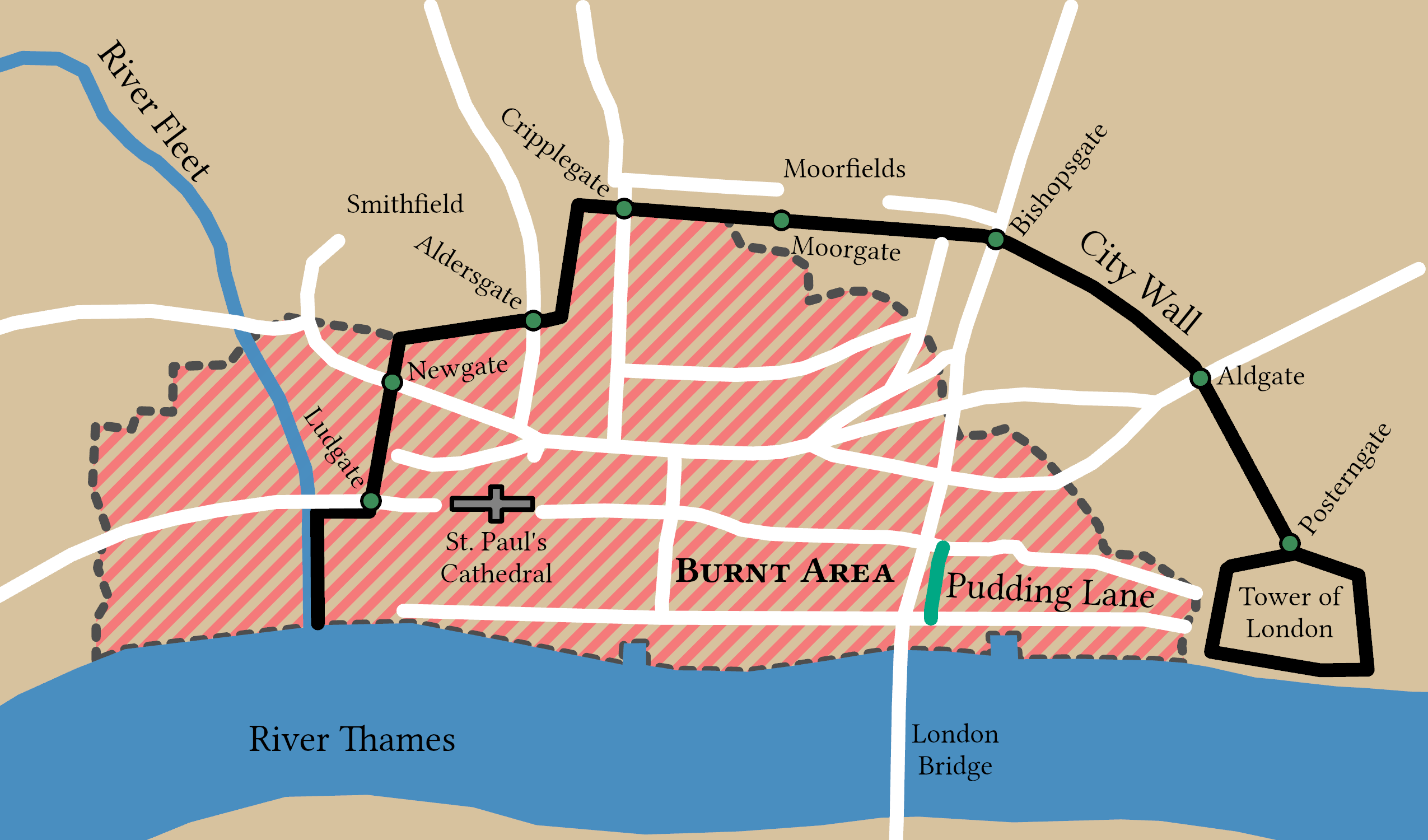
Central London in 1666, with the burnt area shown in pink and outlined in dashes (Pudding Lane origin (Note: Contemporary maps record the site as 23 Pudding Lane. The plot is now "within the roadway of Monument Street".) marked with a green line)

The Great Fire of London occurred from Sunday 2 September to Wednesday 5 September 1666, (Note: All dates are given according to the Julian calendar. When recording British history, it is usual to use the dates recorded at the time of the event. Any dates between 1 January and 25 March have their year adjusted to start on 1 January according to the New Style.) gutting the medieval City of London inside the old Roman city wall, while also extending past the wall to the west. The death toll is generally thought to have been relatively small, although some historians have challenged this belief.

The fire started in a bakery in Pudding Lane shortly after midnight on Sunday 2 September and spread rapidly. The main firefighting technique of the time was the creation of firebreaks by means of removing structures in the fire's path. The Lord Mayor, Sir Thomas Bloodworth, hesitated in giving the order to employ this method. By the time large-scale demolitions were ordered on Sunday night, the wind had already fanned the bakery fire into a firestorm which defeated such measures. The fire pushed north on Monday into the heart of the City. Order in the streets broke down as rumours arose of suspicious foreigners setting fires. The fears of the homeless focused on the French and Dutch, England's enemies in the ongoing Second Anglo-Dutch War; these substantial immigrant groups became victims of street violence. On Tuesday, the fire spread over nearly the whole city, destroying Old St Paul's Cathedral and leaping the River Fleet to threaten Charles II's court at Whitehall Palace. Coordinated firefighting efforts were simultaneously getting underway. The battle to put out the fire is considered to have been won by two key factors: the strong east wind dropped, and the Tower of London garrison used gunpowder to create effective firebreaks, halting further spread eastward.

The social and economic problems created by the disaster were overwhelming. Flight from London and settlement elsewhere were strongly encouraged by Charles II, who feared a London rebellion amongst the dispossessed refugees. Various schemes for rebuilding the city were proposed, some of them radical. After the fire, London was reconstructed on essentially the same medieval street plan, which still exists today.

== London in the 1660s ==
By the 1660s, London was by far the largest city in Britain and the third largest in the Western world, estimated at 300,000 to 400,000 inhabitants. John Evelyn, contrasting London to the Baroque magnificence of Paris in 1659, called it a "wooden, northern, and inartificial congestion of Houses". By "inartificial", Evelyn meant unplanned and makeshift, the result of organic growth and unregulated urban sprawl. London had become progressively more crowded inside its defensive city wall which dated to Roman times. It had also pushed outwards beyond the wall into extramural settlements such as Shoreditch, Holborn, Cripplegate, Clerkenwell and Southwark, and the Inns of Court. To the West it reached along Strand to the Royal Palace and Abbey at Westminster.

By the late 17th century, the City proper—the area bounded by the city wall and the River Thames—was only a part of London, covering some 700 acres (2.8 km^{2}; 1.1 sq mi), and home to about 80,000 people, or one quarter of London's inhabitants. The City was surrounded by a ring of inner suburbs where most Londoners lived. The City was then, as now, the commercial heart of the capital, and was the largest market and busiest port in England, dominated by the trading and manufacturing classes. The City was traffic-clogged, polluted, and unhealthy, especially after it was hit by a devastating outbreak of bubonic plague in the Plague Year of 1665.

The relationship between the City and the Crown was often tense. The City of London had been a stronghold of republicanism during the English Civil Wars (1642–1651), and the wealthy and economically dynamic capital still had the potential to be a threat to Charles II, as had been demonstrated by several republican uprisings in London in the early 1660s. The City magistrates were of the generation that had fought in the Civil War, and could remember how Charles I's grab for absolute power had led to that national trauma. They were determined to thwart any similar tendencies in his son, and when the Great Fire threatened the City, they refused the offers that Charles made of soldiers and other resources. Even in such an emergency, the idea of having the unpopular royal troops ordered into the City was political dynamite. By the time that Charles took over command from the ineffectual Lord Mayor, the fire was already out of control.

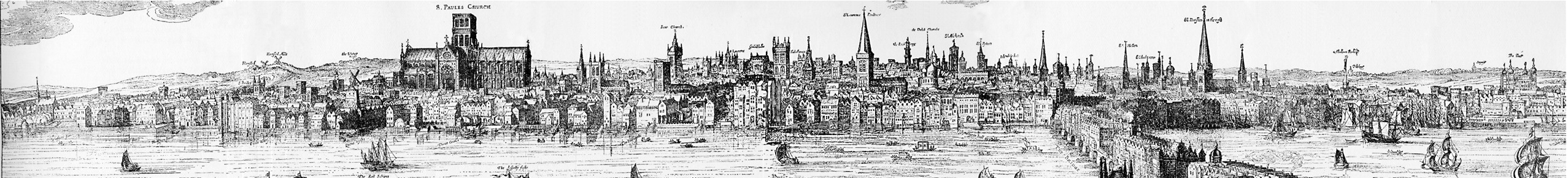
A panorama of the City of London in 1616 by Claes Visscher. The tenement housing on London Bridge (far right) was a notorious death-trap in case of fire; much would be destroyed in a fire in 1633.
Long View of London from Bankside, a panorama of London by Wenceslaus Hollar, 1647, notable for being rendered all from one viewpoint

=== Fire hazards in the city ===
The city was essentially medieval in its street plan, an overcrowded warren of narrow, winding, cobbled alleys. It had experienced several major fires before 1666, the most recent in 1633. Building with wood and roofing with thatch had been prohibited for centuries, but these cheap materials continued to be used. The only major area built with brick or stone was the wealthy centre of the city, where the mansions of the merchants and brokers stood on spacious plots, surrounded by an inner ring of overcrowded poorer parishes, in which all available building space was used to accommodate the rapidly growing population.

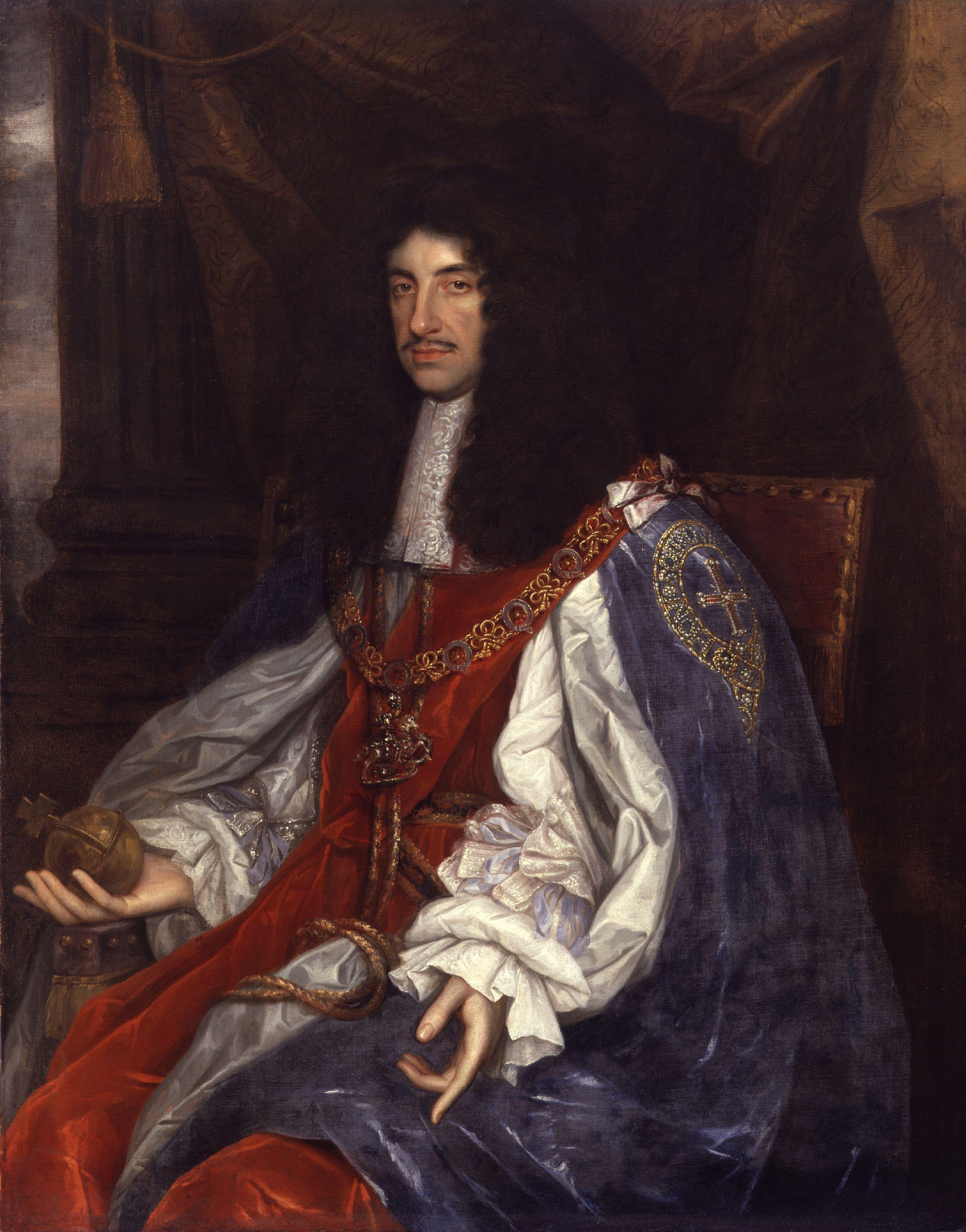
King Charles II

The human habitations were crowded, and their design increased the fire risk. The typical multi-storey timbered London tenement houses had "jetties" (projecting upper floors). They had a narrow footprint at ground level, but maximised their use of land by "encroaching" on the street with the gradually increasing size of their upper storeys. The fire hazard was well perceived when the top jetties all but met across the narrow alleys—"as it does facilitate a conflagration, so does it also hinder the remedy", wrote one observer. In 1661, Charles II issued a proclamation forbidding overhanging windows and jetties, but this was largely ignored by the local government. Charles's next, sharper message in 1665 warned of the risk of fire from the narrowness of the streets and authorised both imprisonment of recalcitrant builders and demolition of dangerous buildings. It too had little impact.

The riverfront was important in the development of the Great Fire. The Thames offered water for firefighting and the chance of escape by boat, but the poorer districts along the riverfront had stores and cellars of combustibles which increased the fire risk. All along the wharves, the rickety wooden tenements and tar paper shacks of the poor were shoehorned amongst "old paper buildings and the most combustible matter of tarr, pitch, hemp, rosen, and flax which was all layd up thereabouts". London was also full of black powder, especially along the riverfront where ship chandlers filled wooden barrels with their stocks. Much of it was left in the homes of private citizens from the days of the English Civil War. Five to six hundred tons of powder was stored in the Tower of London.

The high Roman wall enclosing the city impeded escape from the inferno, restricting exit to eight narrow gates. During the first couple of days, few people had any notion of fleeing the burning city altogether. They would remove what they could carry of their belongings to a safer area; some moved their belongings and themselves "four and five times" in a single day. The perception of a need to get beyond the walls took root only late on the Monday, and then there were near-panic scenes at the gates as distraught refugees tried to get out with their bundles, carts, horses, and wagons.

The crucial factor which frustrated firefighting efforts was the narrowness of the streets. Even under normal circumstances, the mix of carts, wagons, and pedestrians in the undersized alleys was subject to frequent gridlock and accidents. Refugees escaping outwards, away from the centre of destruction, were blocked by soldiers trying to keep the streets clear for firefighters, causing further panic.

=== 17th-century firefighting ===
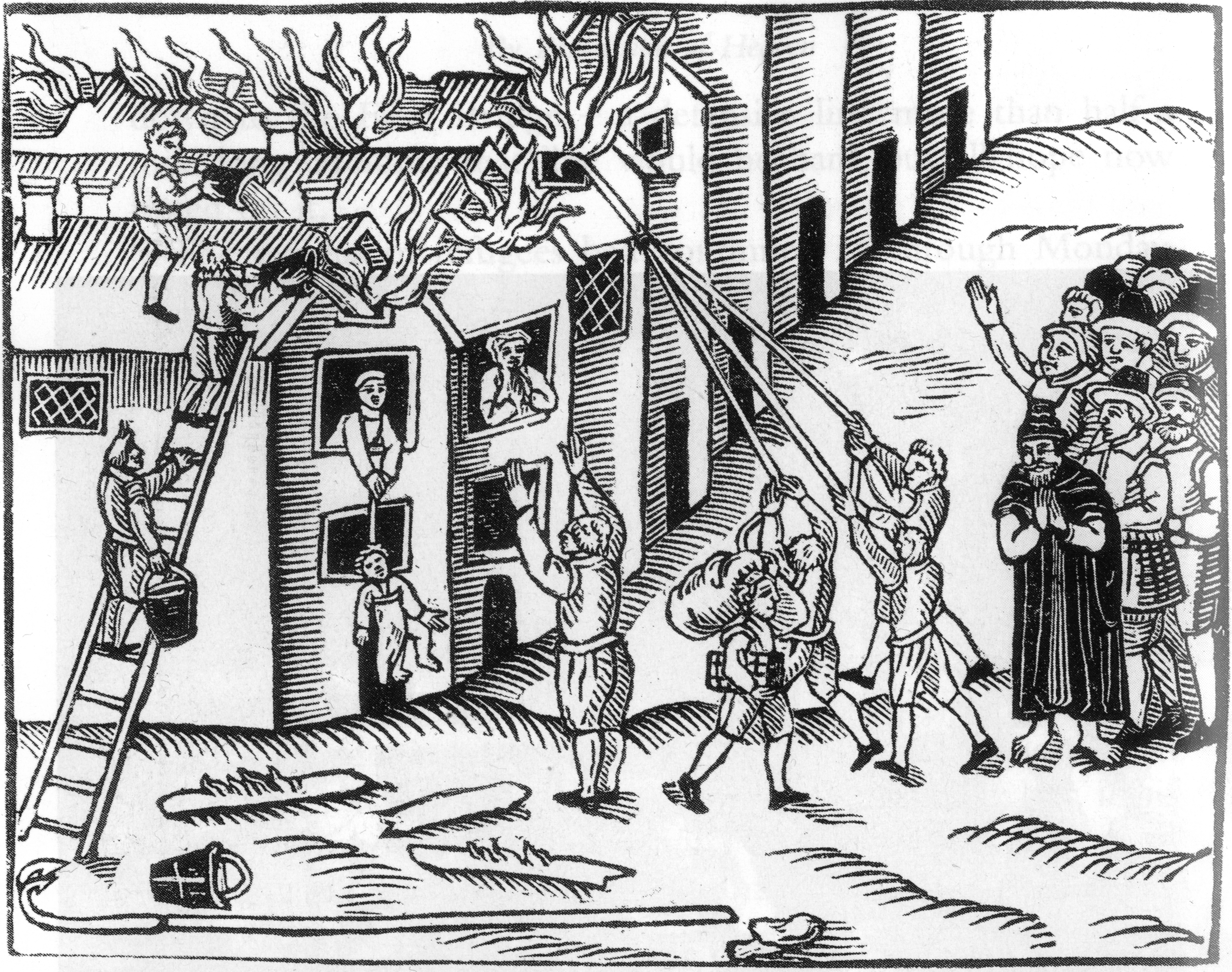
"Firehooks" being used to fight a fire at Tiverton in Devon, England, 1612

Fires were common in the crowded wood-built city with its open fireplaces, candles, ovens, and stores of combustibles. A thousand watchmen or "bellmen" who patrolled the streets at night watched for fire as one of their duties. Self-reliant community procedures were in place for dealing with fires, and they were usually effective. "Public-spirited citizens" would be alerted to a dangerous house fire by muffled peals on the church bells, and would hastily congregate to fight the fire.

The firefighting methods relied on demolition and water. By law, every parish church had to hold equipment for these efforts: long ladders, leather buckets, axes, and "firehooks" for pulling down buildings. (Note: A firehook was a heavy pole perhaps 30 feet (9 m) long with a strong hook and ring at one end, which would be attached to the roof trees of a threatened house and operated by means of ropes and pulleys to pull down the building.) Sometimes buildings were levelled quickly and effectively by means of controlled gunpowder explosions. This drastic method of creating firebreaks was increasingly used towards the end of the Great Fire, and modern historians believe that this, in combination with the wind dying down, was what finally won the struggle. Demolishing the houses downwind of a dangerous fire was often an effective way of containing the destruction by means of firehooks or explosives. This time, however, demolition was fatally delayed for hours by the Lord Mayor's lack of leadership and failure to give the necessary orders.

The use of water to extinguish the fire was frustrated. In principle, water was available from a system of elm pipes which supplied 30,000 houses via a high water tower at Cornhill, filled from the river at high tide, and also via a reservoir of Hertfordshire spring water in Islington. It was often possible to open a pipe near a burning building and connect it to a hose to spray on a fire or fill buckets. Further, the site where the fire started was close to the river: all the lanes from the river up to the bakery and adjoining buildings should have been filled with double chains of firefighters passing buckets of water up to the fire and then back down to the river to be refilled. This did not happen, as inhabitants panicked and fled. The flames crept towards the riverfront and set alight the water wheels under London Bridge, eliminating the supply of piped water.

London possessed advanced firefighting technology in the form of fire engines, which had been used in earlier large-scale fires. However, unlike the useful firehooks, these large pumps had rarely proved flexible or functional enough to make much difference. Only some of them had wheels; others were mounted on wheelless sleds. They had to be brought a long way, tended to arrive too late, and had limited reach, with spouts but no delivery hoses. (Note: A patent had been granted in 1625 for the fire engines; they were single-acting force pumps worked by long handles at the front and back.) On this occasion, an unknown number of fire engines were either wheeled or dragged through the streets. Firefighters tried to manoeuvre the engines to the river to fill their tanks, and several of the engines fell into the Thames. The heat from the flames by then was too great for the remaining engines to get within a useful distance.

== Development of the fire ==
=== Sunday ===
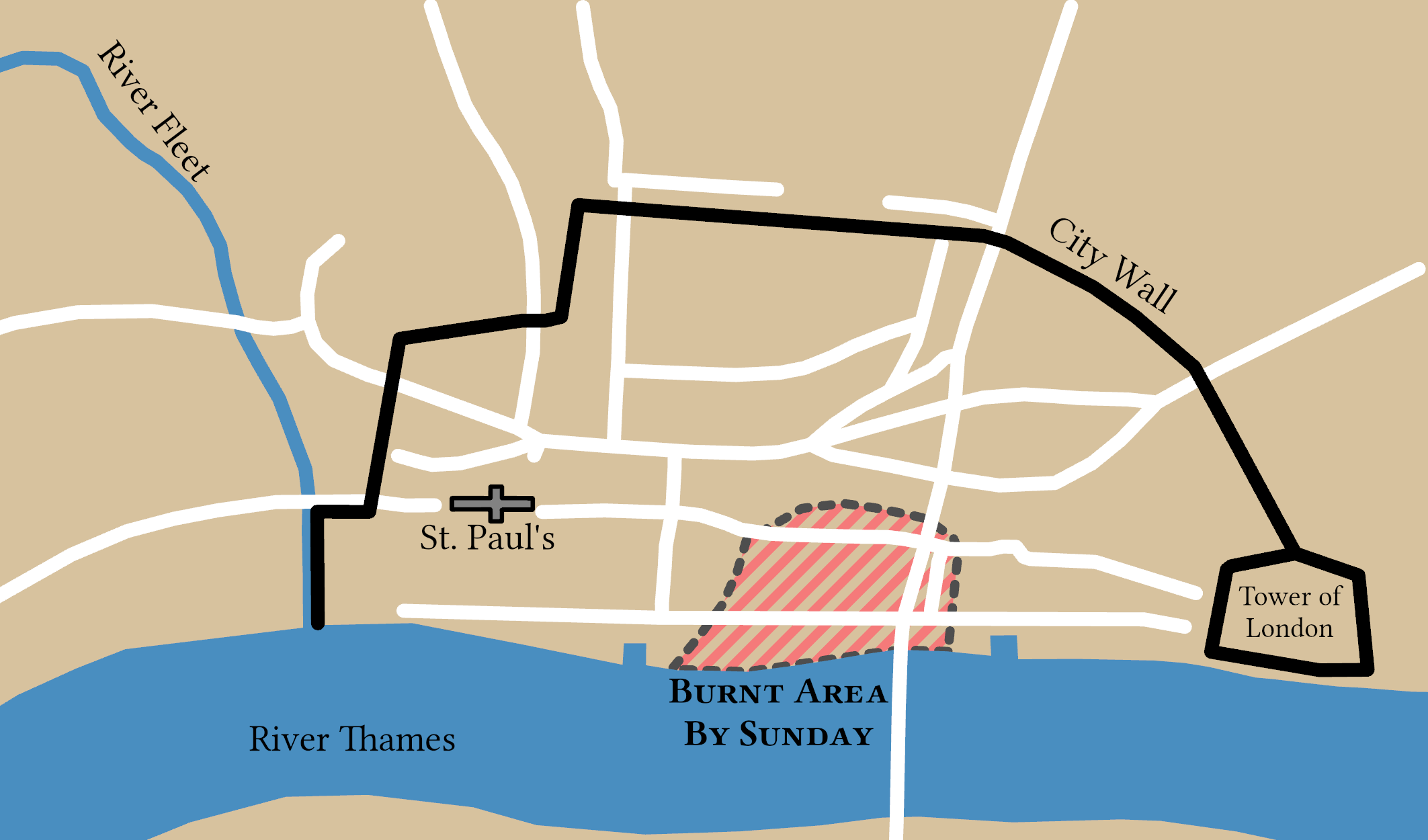
Approximate damage by the evening of Sunday, 2 September, outlined in dashes (Pudding Lane origin is short vertical road in lower right damage area).

A short time after midnight on Sunday, 2 September 1666, a fire broke out at Thomas Farriner's bakery in Pudding Lane. The occupants, save the family's maidservant, who was too frightened to try, fled through an upstairs window to the house next door. When the house burned down, she became the fire's first victim. Farriner's neighbours tried to douse the fire; after an hour, the parish constables arrived and judged that the adjoining houses should be demolished to prevent further spread. The householders protested, and Lord Mayor Sir Thomas Bloodworth was summoned to give his permission.

When Bloodworth arrived, the flames were consuming the adjoining houses and creeping towards the warehouses and flammable stores on the riverfront. The more experienced firemen were calling for demolition, but Bloodworth refused on the grounds that most premises were rented and the owners could not be found. Bloodworth is generally thought to have been appointed to the office of Lord Mayor as a yes man, rather than because he possessed the requisite capabilities for the job. He panicked when faced with a sudden emergency, and, when pressed, made the oft-quoted remark, "A woman might piss it out", and left. Jacob Field notes that although Bloodworth "is frequently held culpable by contemporaries (as well as some later historians) for not stopping the Fire in its early stages... there was little [he] could have done" given the state of firefighting expertise and the sociopolitical implications of anti-fire action at that time.

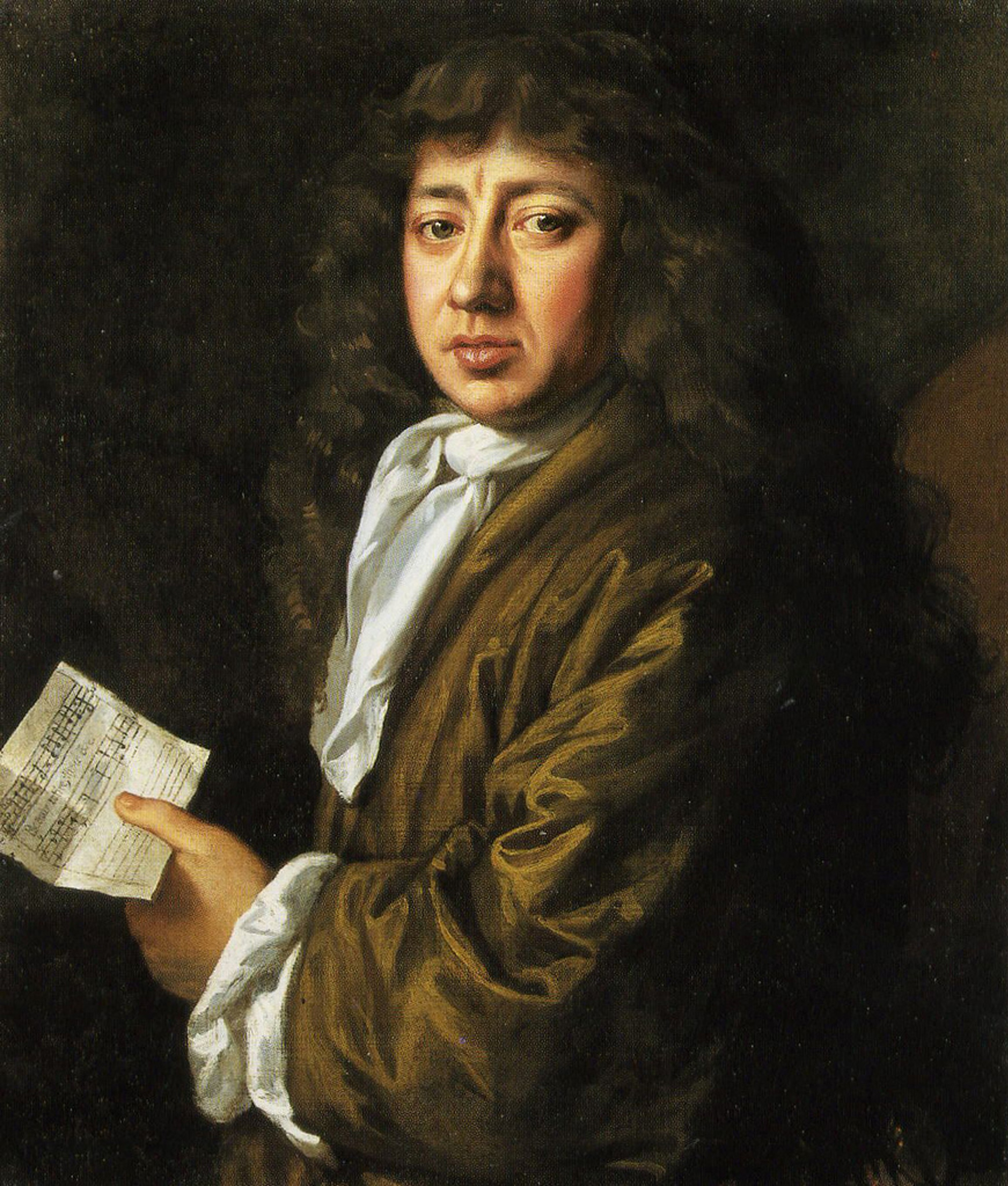
Oil painting of the diarist Samuel Pepys, 1666

Later that morning, Samuel Pepys ascended the Tower of London to view the fire from its battlements. In his diary, he recorded that the eastern gale had turned the fire into a conflagration. It had burned down an estimated 300 houses on its march to the riverfront, and the houses on London Bridge were burning. He took a boat to inspect the destruction around Pudding Lane at close range, describing a "lamentable" fire, "everybody endeavouring to remove their goods, and flinging into the river or bringing them into lighters that lay off; poor people staying in their houses as long as till the very fire touched them, and then running into boats, or clambering from one pair of stairs by the water-side to another." Pepys continued westward on the river to the court at Whitehall, "where people come about me, and did give them an account dismayed them all, and the word was carried into the King. So I was called for, and did tell the King and Duke of Yorke what I saw, and that unless His Majesty did command houses to be pulled down nothing could stop the fire. They seemed much troubled, and the King commanded me to go to my Lord Mayor from him and command him to spare no houses, but to pull down before the fire every way." Charles' brother James, Duke of York, offered the use of the Royal Life Guards to help fight the fire.

As mentioned by Pepys, the fire spread quickly in the high wind. By mid-morning on Sunday, people abandoned attempts at extinguishing it and fled. The moving human mass and their bundles and carts made the lanes impassable for firemen and carriages. Pepys took a coach back into the city from Whitehall, but reached only St Paul's Cathedral before he had to get out and walk. Pedestrians with handcarts and goods were still on the move away from the fire, heavily weighed down. They deposited their valuables in parish churches away from the direct threat of fire.

Pepys found Bloodworth trying to coordinate the firefighting efforts and near to collapse, "like a fainting woman", crying out plaintively in response to the King's message that he was pulling down houses: "But the fire overtakes us faster than we can do it." Holding on to his "dignity and civic authority", he refused James's offer of more soldiers and then went home to bed. King Charles II sailed down from Whitehall in the Royal barge to inspect the scene. He found that houses were still not being pulled down, in spite of Bloodworth's assurances to Pepys, and overrode the authority of Bloodworth to order wholesale demolitions west of the fire zone.

By Sunday afternoon, the fire had become a raging firestorm that created its own weather. A tremendous uprush of hot air above the flames was driven by the chimney effect wherever constrictions narrowed the air current, such as the constricted space between jettied buildings, and this left a vacuum at ground level. The resulting strong inward winds fuelled the flames. The fire pushed towards the city's centre "in a broad, bow-shaped arc". By Sunday evening, it "was already the most damaging fire to strike London in living memory", having travelled 500 metres (1,600 ft) west along the river.

=== Monday ===
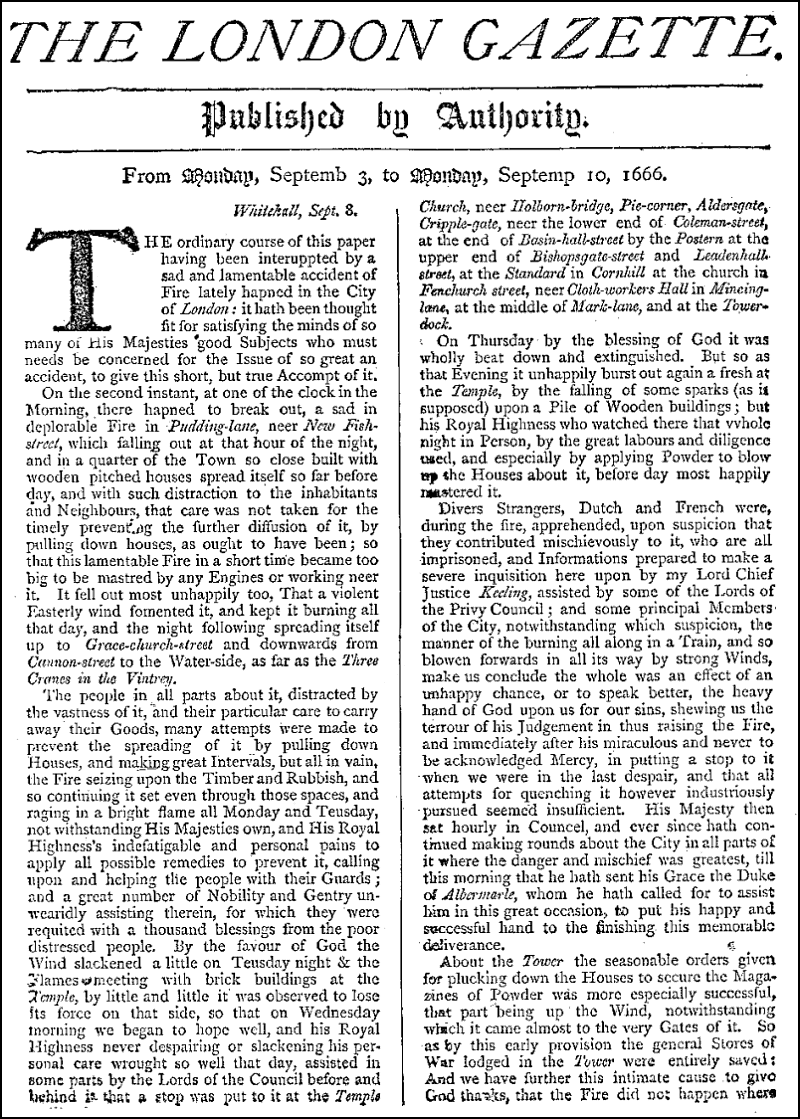
The London Gazette for 3–10 September, facsimile front page with an account of the Great Fire

Throughout Monday, the fire spread to the west and north. The spread to the south was mostly halted by the river, but it had torched the houses on London Bridge and was threatening to cross the bridge and endanger the borough of Southwark on the south bank of the river. London Bridge, the only physical connection between the City and the south side of the river Thames, had been noted as a deathtrap in the fire of 1633. However, Southwark was preserved by an open space between buildings on the bridge which acted as a firebreak.

The fire's spread to the north reached "the financial heart of the City". The houses of the bankers in Lombard Street began to burn on Monday afternoon, prompting a rush to rescue their stacks of gold coins before they melted. Several observers emphasise the despair and helplessness which seemed to seize Londoners on this second day, and the lack of efforts to save the wealthy, fashionable districts which were now menaced by the flames, such as the Royal Exchange—combined Exchange (organised market or bourse) and shopping centre—and the opulent consumer goods shops in Cheapside. The Royal Exchange caught fire in the late afternoon, and was a "smoking shell" within a few hours. John Evelyn, courtier and diarist, wrote:

The conflagration was so universal, and the people so astonished, that from the beginning, I know not by what despondency or fate, they hardly stirred to quench it, so that there was nothing heard or seen but crying out and lamentation, running about like distracted creatures without at all attempting to save even their goods, such a strange consternation there was upon them.

Evelyn lived in Deptford, four miles (6 km) outside the City, and so he did not see the early stages of the disaster. He went by coach to Southwark on Monday, joining many other upper-class people, to see the view which Pepys had seen the day before of the burning City across the river. The conflagration was much larger now: "the whole City in dreadful flames near the water-side; all the houses from the Bridge, all Thames-street, and upwards towards Cheapside, down to the Three Cranes, were now consumed". In the evening, Evelyn reported that the river was covered with barges and boats making their escape piled with goods. He observed a great exodus of carts and pedestrians through the bottleneck City gates, making for the open fields to the north and east, "which for many miles were strewed with moveables of all sorts, and tents erecting to shelter both people and what goods they could get away. Oh, the miserable and calamitous spectacle!"

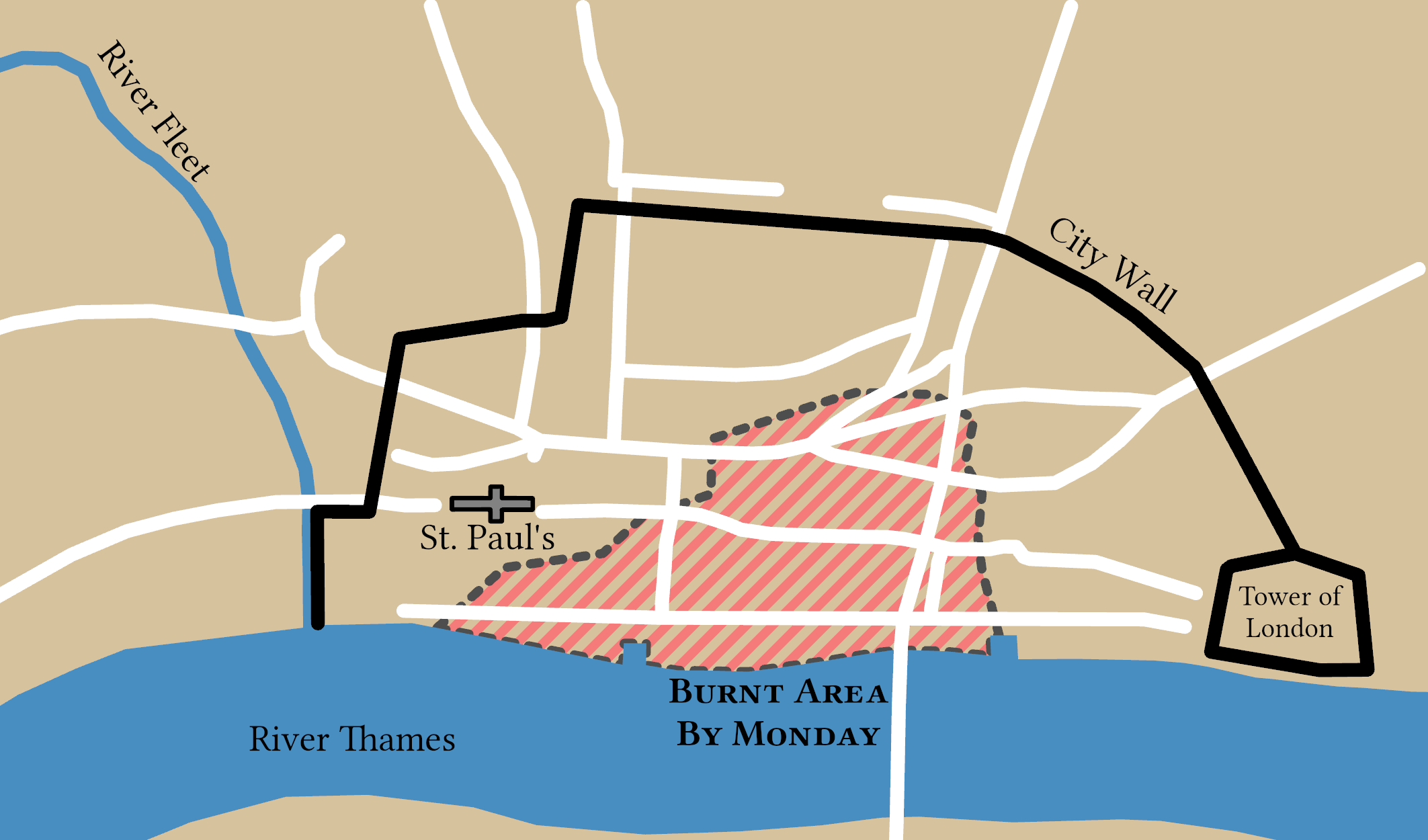
Approximate damage by the evening of Monday, 3 September, outlined in dashes (Pudding Lane origin is short vertical road in lower right damage area.)

Suspicion soon arose in the threatened city that the fire was no accident. The swirling winds carried sparks and burning flakes long distances to lodge on thatched roofs and in wooden gutters, causing seemingly unrelated house fires to break out far from their source and giving rise to rumours that fresh fires were being set on purpose. Foreigners were immediately suspected because of the ongoing Second Anglo-Dutch War. Fear and suspicion hardened into certainty on Monday, as reports circulated of imminent invasion and of foreign undercover agents seen casting "fireballs" into houses, or caught with hand grenades or matches. There was a wave of street violence.

The fears of terrorism received an extra boost from the disruption of communications and news. The General Letter Office in Threadneedle Street, through which post passed for the entire country, burned down early on Monday morning. The London Gazette just managed to put out its Monday issue before the printer's premises went up in flames. Suspicions rose to panic and collective paranoia on Monday, and both the London Trained Bands and Lord General's Regiment of Foot Guards focused less on fire fighting and more on rounding up foreigners and anyone else appearing suspicious, arresting them, rescuing them from mobs, or both.

The inhabitants, especially the upper class, were growing desperate to remove their belongings from the City. This provided a source of income for the able-bodied poor, who hired out as porters (sometimes simply making off with the goods), being especially profitable for the owners of carts and boats. Hiring a cart had cost a couple of shillings the week before the fire; on Monday, it rose to as much as £40, a fortune equivalent to roughly £133,000 in 2021. Seemingly every cart and boat owner in the area of London came to share in these opportunities, the carts jostling at the narrow gates with the panicked inhabitants trying to get out. The chaos at the gates was such that the magistrates briefly ordered the gates shut, in the hope of turning the inhabitants' attention from safeguarding their own possessions to fighting the fire: "that, no hopes of saving any things left, they might have more desperately endeavoured the quenching of the fire."

Monday marked the beginning of organised action, even as order broke down in the streets, especially at the gates, and the fire raged unchecked. Bloodworth was responsible as Lord Mayor for coordinating the firefighting, but he had apparently left the City; his name is not mentioned in any contemporaneous accounts of the Monday's events. In this state of emergency, the King put his brother James, Duke of York, in charge of operations. James set up command posts on the perimeter of the fire. Three courtiers were put in charge of each post, with authority from Charles himself to order demolitions. James and his guards rode up and down the streets all Monday, "rescuing foreigners from the mob" and attempting to keep order. "The Duke of York hath won the hearts of the people with his continual and indefatigable pains day and night in helping to quench the Fire," wrote a witness in a letter on 8 September.

On Monday evening, hopes were dashed that the massive stone walls of Baynard's Castle, Blackfriars, the western counterpart of the Tower of London, would stay the course of the flames. This historic royal palace was completely consumed, burning all night.

=== Tuesday ===
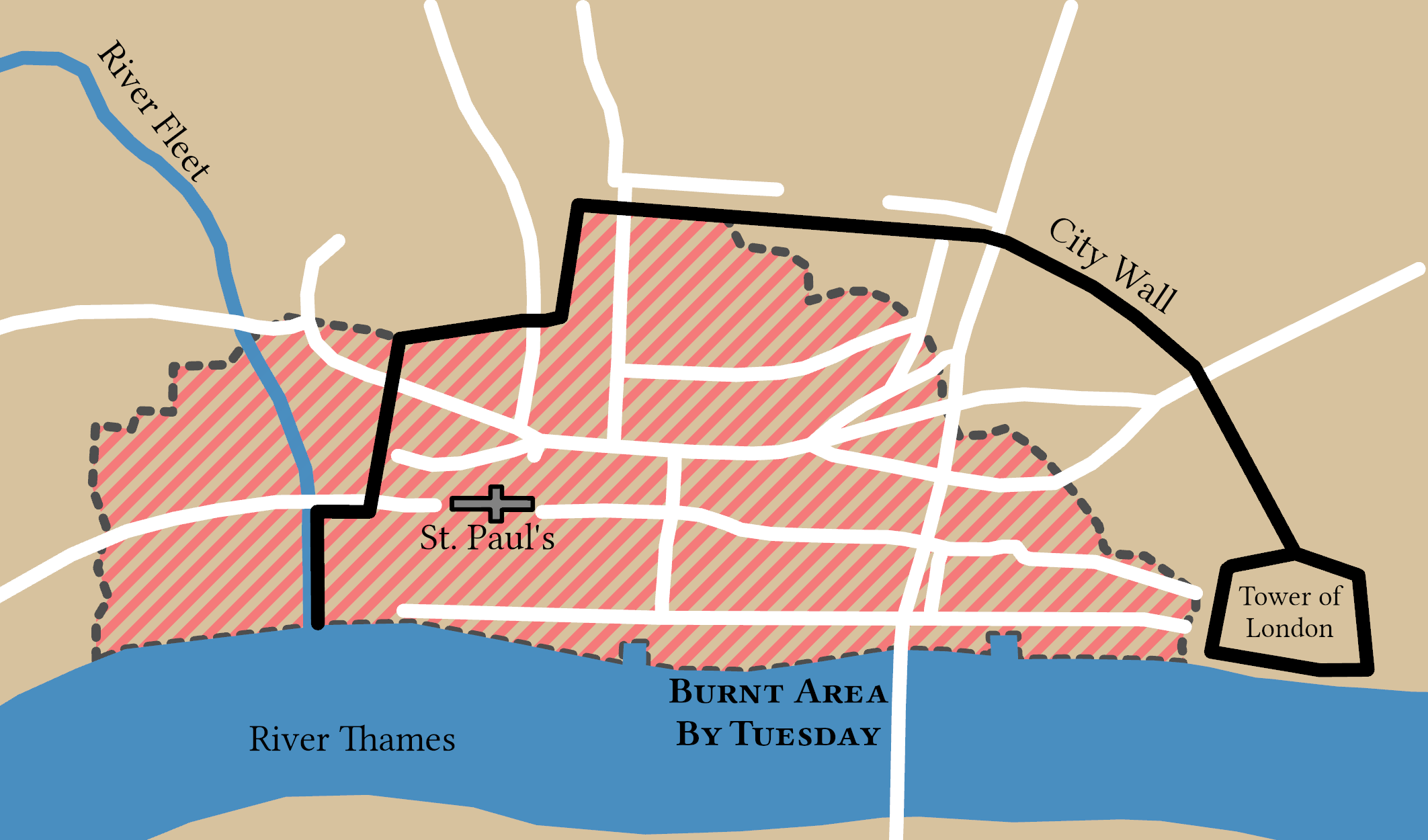
Approximate damage by the evening of Tuesday, 4 September. The fire did not spread significantly on Wednesday, 5 September.

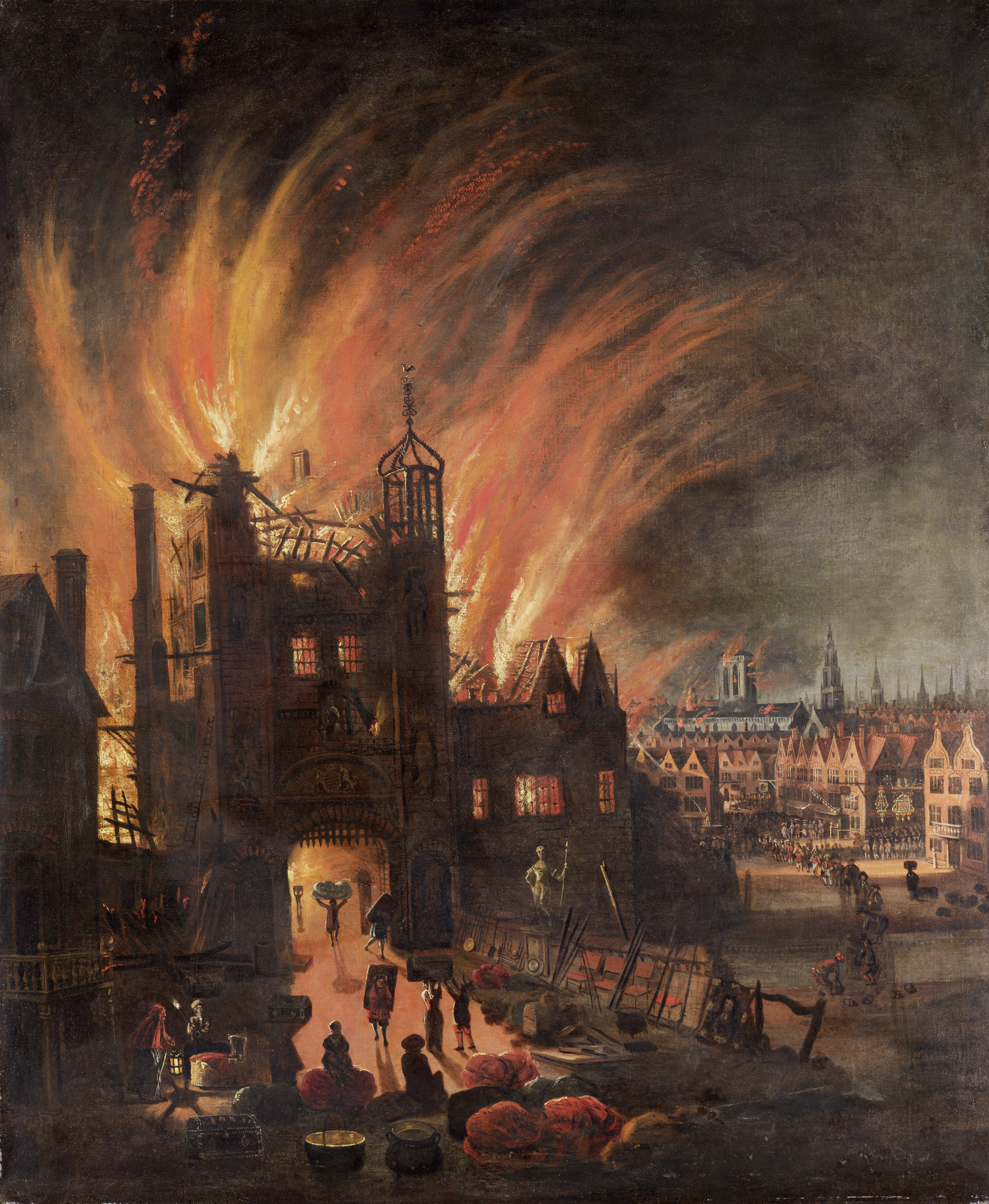
Ludgate in flames, with St Paul's Cathedral in the distance (square tower without the spire) now catching flames. Oil painting by anonymous artist, c. 1670.

Tuesday, 4 September was the day of greatest destruction. The Duke of York's command post at Temple Bar, where Strand meets Fleet Street, was supposed to stop the fire's westward advance towards the Palace of Whitehall. He hoped that the River Fleet would form a natural firebreak, making a stand with his firemen from the Fleet Bridge and down to the Thames. However, early on Tuesday morning, the flames jumped over the Fleet and outflanked them, driven by the unabated easterly gale, forcing them to run for it.

By mid-morning the fire had breached the wide affluent luxury shopping street of Cheapside. James's firefighters created a large firebreak to the north of the conflagration, although it was breached at multiple points. Through the day, the flames began to move eastward from the neighbourhood of Pudding Lane, straight against the prevailing east wind and towards the Tower of London with its gunpowder stores. The garrison at the Tower took matters into their own hands after waiting all day for requested help from James's official firemen, who were busy in the west. They created firebreaks by blowing up houses on a large scale in the vicinity, halting the advance of the fire.

With its thick stone walls and a wide, empty plaza which could serve as a firebreak, it was assumed St. Paul's Cathedral would be a safe refuge from the fire. It had been crammed full of rescued goods, and its crypt was filled with the tightly packed stocks of the printers and booksellers in adjoining Paternoster Row. However, as it was undergoing restoration at the direction of Christopher Wren, the church was covered in wooden scaffolding. This caught fire on Tuesday night, and within half an hour, the lead roof was melting, and the books and papers in the crypt were burning. The cathedral was quickly a ruin.

=== Wednesday ===
The wind dropped on Tuesday evening, and the firebreaks created by the garrison finally began to take effect on Wednesday, 5 September. Pepys climbed the steeple of Barking Church, from which he viewed the destroyed City, "the saddest sight of desolation that I ever saw". There were many separate fires still burning, but the Great Fire was over. It took some time until the last traces were put out: coal was still burning in cellars two months later.

In Moorfields, a large public park immediately north of the City, there was a great encampment of homeless refugees. Evelyn was horrified at the numbers of distressed people filling it, some under tents, others in makeshift shacks: "Many [were] without a rag or any necessary utensils, bed or board ... reduced to extremest misery and poverty." Most refugees camped in any nearby available unburned area to see if they could salvage anything from their homes. The mood was now so volatile that Charles feared a full-scale London rebellion against the monarchy. Food production and distribution had been disrupted to the point of non-existence; Charles announced that supplies of bread would be brought into the City every day, and markets set up round the perimeter.

Fears of foreign terrorists and of a French and Dutch invasion were as high as ever among the traumatised fire victims. There was panic on Wednesday night in the encampments at Parliament Hill, Moorfields, and Islington: a light in the sky over Fleet Street started a story that 50,000 French and Dutch immigrants had risen, and were marching towards Moorfields to murder and pillage. Surging into the streets, the frightened mob fell on any foreigners whom they happened to encounter, and were pushed back into the fields by the Trained Bands, Life Guards and members of the royal court. The light turned out to be a flareup east of Inner Temple, large sections of which burned despite an effort to halt the fire by blowing up Paper House.

== Deaths and destruction ==
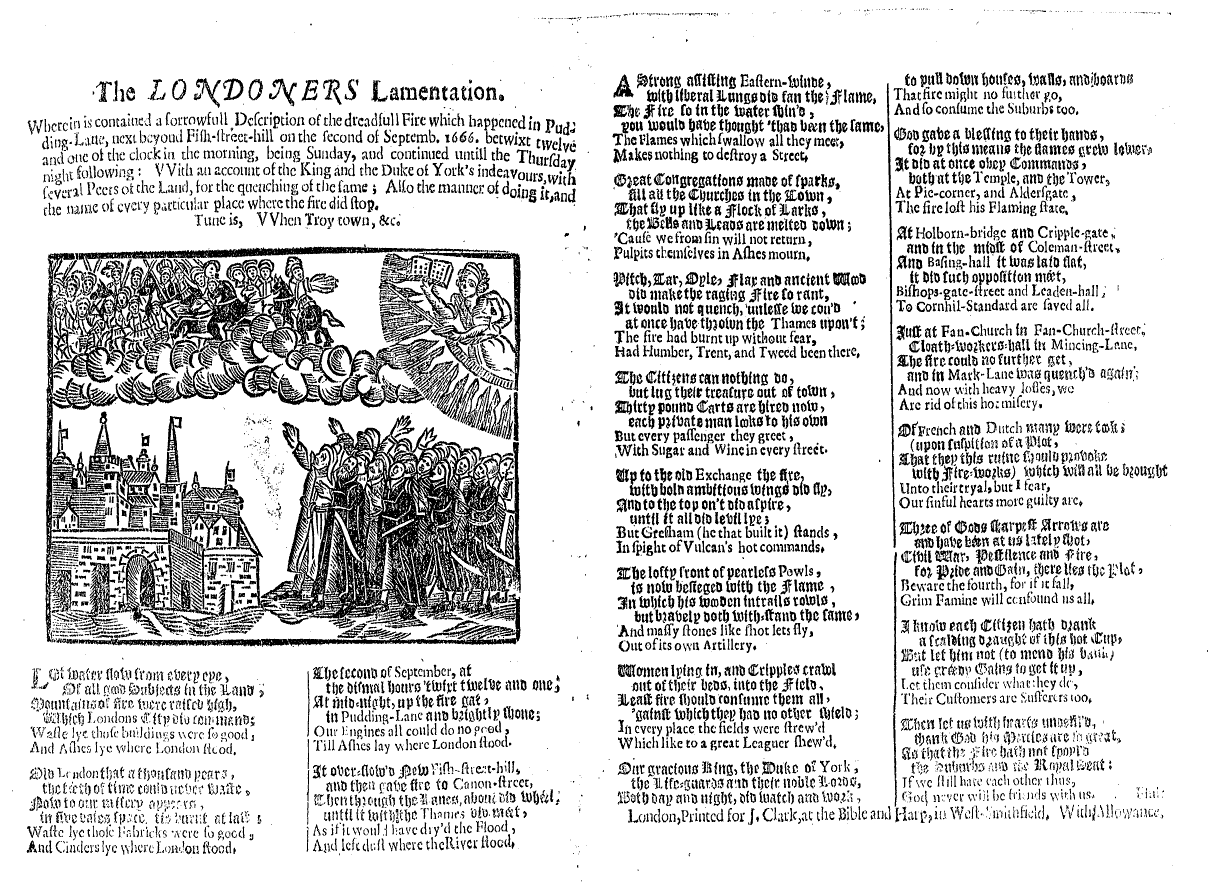
The LONDONERS Lamentation, a broadside ballad published in 1666 giving an account of the fire, and of the limits of its destruction

Only a few deaths from the fire are officially recorded, and deaths are traditionally believed to have been few. Porter gives the figure as eight and Tinniswood as "in single figures", although he adds that some deaths must have gone unrecorded and that, besides direct deaths from burning and smoke inhalation, refugees also perished in the impromptu camps. Field argues that the number "may have been higher than the traditional figure of six, but it is likely it did not run into the hundreds": he notes that the London Gazette "did not record a single fatality" and that had there been a significant death toll it would have been reflected in polemical accounts and petitions for charity.

Neil Hanson takes issue with the idea that there were only a few deaths, enumerating known deaths from hunger and exposure among survivors of the fire, "huddled in shacks or living among the ruins that had once been their homes" in the cold winter that followed. The dramatist James Shirley and his wife are believed to have died in this way. Hanson maintains that "it stretches credulity to believe that the only papists or foreigners being beaten to death or lynched were the ones rescued by the Duke of York", that official figures say very little about the fate of the undocumented poor, and that the heat at the heart of the firestorms was far greater than an ordinary house fire, and was enough to consume bodies fully or leave only a few skeletal fragments, producing a death toll not of eight, but of "several hundred and quite possibly several thousand."

The material destruction has been computed at 13,200–13,500 houses, 86 or 87 parish churches, 44 Company Halls, the Royal Exchange, the Custom House, St Paul's Cathedral, the Bridewell Palace and other City prisons, the General Letter Office, and the three western city gates—Ludgate, Newgate, and Aldersgate. The monetary value of the loss was estimated at around 9–10 million pounds (equivalent to £2.03 billion in 2025). François Colsoni says that the lost books alone were valued at £150,000. Evelyn believed that he saw as many as "200,000 people of all ranks and stations dispersed, and lying along their heaps of what they could save" in the fields towards Islington and Highgate. The fire destroyed approximately 15 percent of the city's housing.

== Reaction ==
The Court of Aldermen sought to quickly begin clearing debris and re-establish food supplies. By the Saturday after the fire "the markets were operating well enough to supply the people" at Moorfields. Charles II encouraged the homeless to move away from London and settle elsewhere, immediately issuing a proclamation that "all Cities and Towns whatsoever shall without any contradiction receive the said distressed persons and permit them the free exercise of their manual trades". Royal proclamations were issued to forbid people to "disquiet themselves with rumours of tumults", and to institute a national charitable collection to support fire victims. The official account of the fire in the London Gazette concluded that the fire was an accident: "it stressed the role of God in starting the flames and of the king in helping to stem them".

Despite this, residents were inclined to put the blame for the fire on foreigners, particularly Catholics, the French, and the Dutch. The Trained Bands were put on guard and foreigners arrested in locations throughout England. An example of the urge to identify scapegoats for the fire is the acceptance of the confession of a simple-minded French watchmaker named Robert Hubert, who claimed that he was a member of a gang that had started the Great Fire in Westminster. He later changed his story to say that he had started the fire at the bakery in Pudding Lane. Hubert was convicted, despite some misgivings about his fitness to plead, and hanged at Tyburn on 29 October 1666. After his death, it became apparent that he had been on board a ship in the North Sea, and had not arrived in London until two days after the fire started.

A committee was established to investigate the cause of the Great Fire, chaired by Sir Robert Brooke. It received many submissions alleging a conspiracy of foreigners and Catholics to destroy London. The committee's report was presented to Parliament on 22 January 1667. Versions of the report that appeared in print concluded that Hubert was one of a number of Catholic plotters responsible for starting the fire. Abroad in the Dutch Republic, the Great Fire of London was seen as a divine retribution for Holmes's Bonfire, the burning of a Dutch town by English forces during the Second Anglo-Dutch War. In Italy, a pamphlet circulated comparing London "to Lucifer in its proud arrogance and its spectacular fall". In Spain, the fire was seen as a "parable of Protestant wickedness".

On 5 October, Marc Antonio Giustinian, Venetian Ambassador in France, reported to the Doge of Venice and the Senate, that Louis XIV announced that he would not "have any rejoicings about it, being such a deplorable accident involving injury to so many unhappy people". Louis had made an offer to his aunt, the English Queen Dowager Henrietta Maria, to send food and whatever goods might be of aid in alleviating the plight of Londoners, yet he made no secret that he regarded "the fire of London as a stroke of good fortune for him" as it reduced the risk of French ships crossing the English Channel being attacked by the Royal Navy. Louis tried to take advantage but an attempt by a Franco-Dutch fleet to combine with a larger Dutch fleet ended in failure on 17 September at the Battle of Dungeness when they encountered a larger English naval force led by Thomas Allin.

== Rebuilding ==
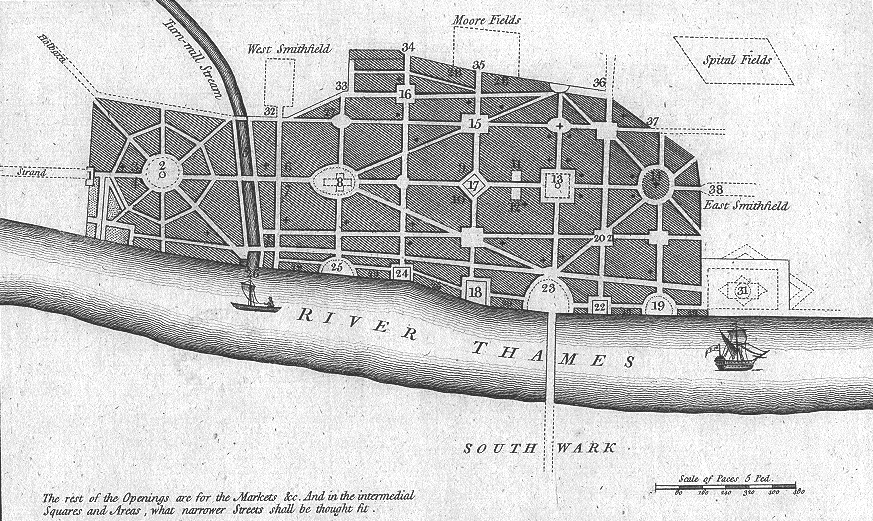
John Evelyn's plan, never carried out, for rebuilding a radically different City of London

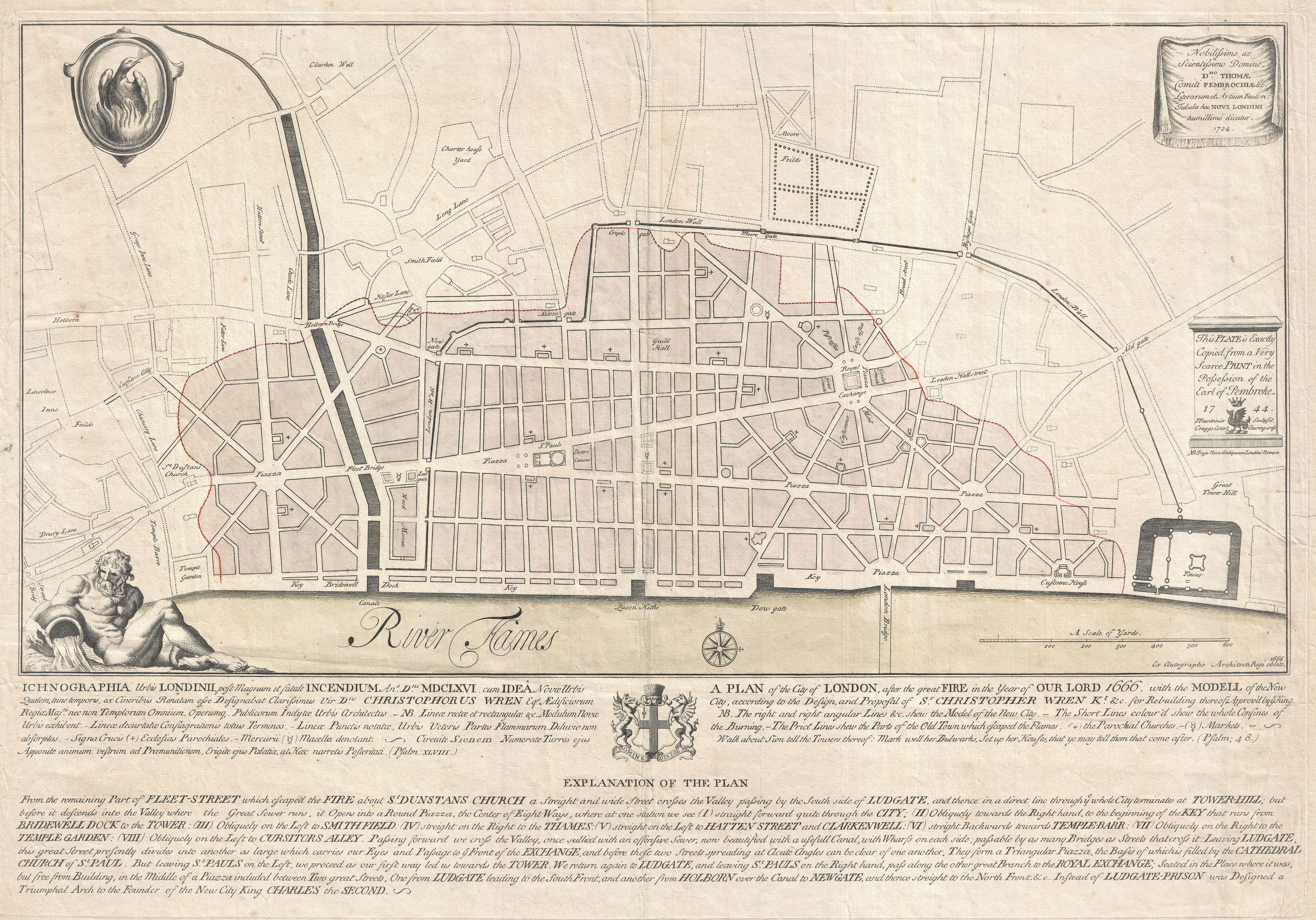
Christopher Wren's rejected plan for the rebuilding of London

A special Fire Court was set up from February 1667 to December 1668, and again from 1670 to February 1676. The aim of the court, which was authorised by the Fire of London Disputes Act 1666 and the Rebuilding of London Act 1670, was to deal with disputes between tenants and landlords and decide who should rebuild, based on ability to pay. Cases were heard and a verdict usually given within a day; without the Fire Court, lengthy legal proceedings would have seriously delayed the rebuilding which was necessary if London was to recover.

Radical rebuilding schemes poured in for the gutted City and were encouraged by Charles. Apart from Wren and Evelyn, it is known that Robert Hooke, Valentine Knight, and Richard Newcourt proposed rebuilding plans. All were based on a grid system, which became prevalent in the American urban landscape. If it had been rebuilt under some of these plans, London may have rivalled Paris in Baroque magnificence. According to archaeologist John Schofield, Wren's plan "would have probably encouraged the crystallisation of the social classes into separate areas", similar to Haussmann's renovation of Paris in the mid-1800s. Wren's plan was particularly challenging to implement because of the need to redefine property titles.

The Crown and the City authorities attempted to negotiate compensation for the large-scale remodelling that these plans entailed, but that unrealistic idea had to be abandoned. Exhortations to bring workmen and measure the plots on which the houses had stood were mostly ignored by people worried about day-to-day survival, as well as by those who had left the capital; for one thing, with the shortage of labour following the fire, it was impossible to secure workmen for the purpose.

Instead, much of the old street plan was recreated in the new City. According to Michael Hebbert, this process "accelerated the development of scientific survey and cartographic techniques", including the development of ichnographical city maps. The reconstruction saw improvements in hygiene and fire safety: wider streets, open and accessible wharves along the length of the Thames, with no houses obstructing access to the river, and, most importantly, buildings constructed of brick and stone, not wood. The Rebuilding of London Act 1666 banned wood from the exterior of buildings, regulated the cost of building materials and the wages of workers, and set out a rebuilding period of three years, after which the land could be sold. A duty was imposed on coal to support civic rebuilding costs. Most private rebuilding was complete by 1671. New public buildings were created on their predecessors' sites including St Paul's Cathedral and Christopher Wren's 51 new churches. English economist Nicholas Barbon helped develop the Strand, St. Giles, Bloomsbury and Holborn.

== Impact ==
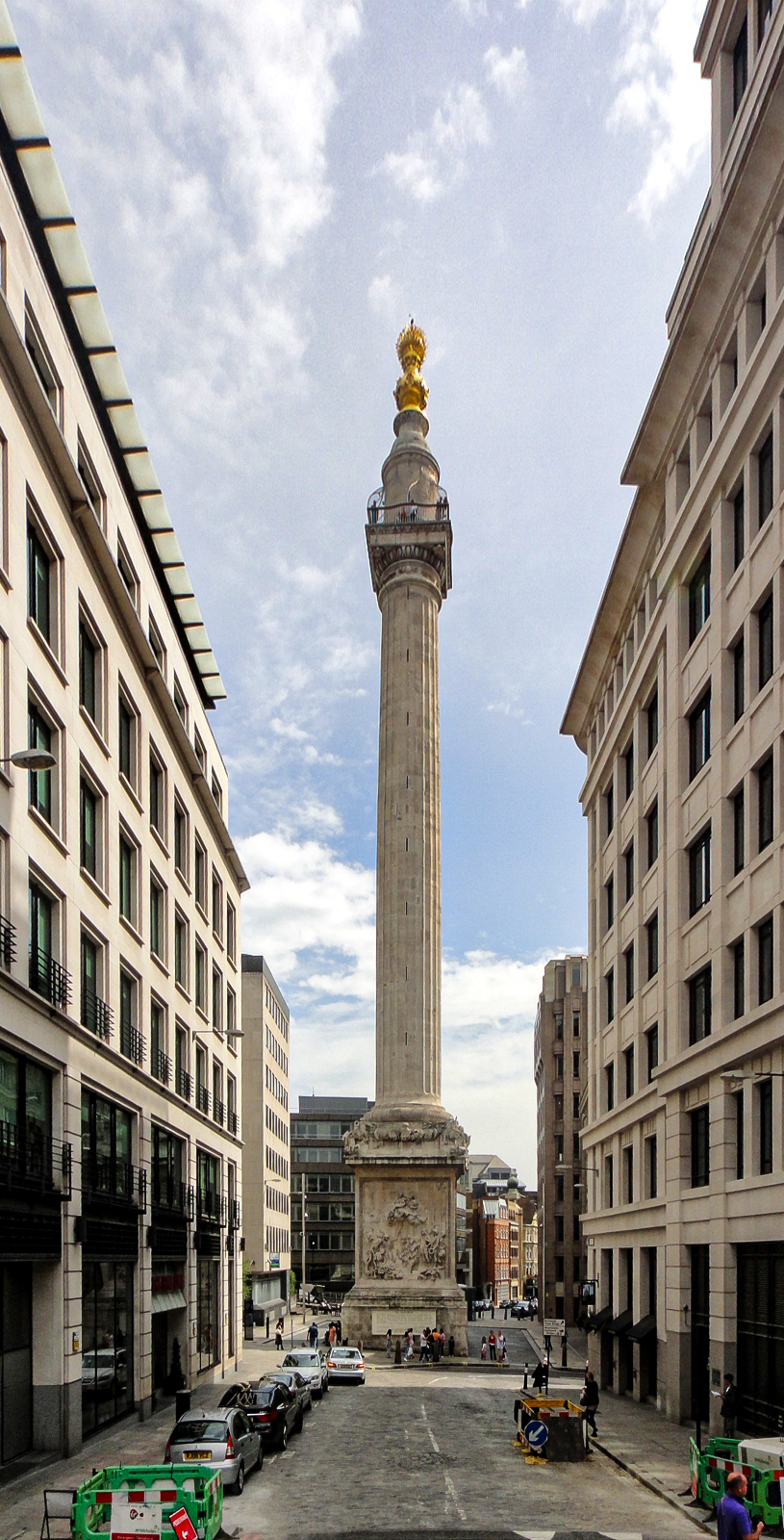
The 1677 Monument to the Great Fire of London stands near the rebuilt London Bridge on the site of a lost church, St Margaret, New Fish Street.

In addition to the physical changes to London, the Great Fire had a significant demographic, social, political, economic, and cultural impact. The fire "caused the largest dislocation of London's residential structure in its history until the Blitz". Areas to the west of London received the highest number of new residents, but there was a general increase in the population density of the suburbs surrounding London. Approximately 9,000 new houses were built in the area in which over 13,000 had been destroyed, and by 1674 thousands of these remained unoccupied. Tenants who did remain in London saw a significant decrease in the costs of their lease.

The fire seriously disrupted commercial activity, as premises and stock were destroyed and victims faced heavy debts and rebuilding costs. As a result, economic recovery was slow. The City of London Corporation borrowed heavily to fund its rebuilding, defaulting on its loans in 1683; as a result, it had its privileges stripped by Charles. The commercial district of London had significant vacancies as merchants who had left the city resettled elsewhere. Charitable foundations experienced significant financial losses because of direct fire-related costs as well as loss of rental income. Despite these factors, London retained its "economic pre-eminence" because of the access to shipping routes and its continued central role in political and cultural life in England.

According to Jacob Field, "the reaction to the Fire revealed England's long-standing hostility to Catholics, which manifested itself most visibly at times of crisis". Allegations that Catholics had started the fire were exploited as powerful political propaganda by opponents of pro-Catholic Charles II's court, mostly during the Popish Plot and the exclusion crisis later in his reign. The Royalist perspective of the fire as accidental was opposed by the Whig view questioning the loyalties of Catholics in general and the Duke of York in particular.

In 1667 strict new fire regulations were imposed in London to reduce the risk of future fire and allow any fire that did occur to be more easily extinguished. The fire resulted in the emergence of the first insurance companies, starting with Nicholas Barbon's Fire Office. These companies hired private firemen and offered incentives for clients who took measures to prevent fires—for example, a cheaper rate for brick versus wooden buildings. Confusion between parish and private firefighting efforts led the insurance companies in 1832 to form a combined firefighting unit which would eventually become the London Fire Brigade. The fire led to a focus in building codes on restricting the spread of fire between units.

The Great Plague epidemic of 1665 is believed to have killed a sixth of London's inhabitants, or 80,000 people, and it is sometimes suggested that the fire saved lives in the long run by burning down so much unsanitary housing with their rats and their fleas which transmitted the plague, as plague epidemics did not recur in London after the fire. During the Bombay plague epidemic two centuries later, this belief led to the burning of tenements as an anti-plague measure. The suggestion that the fire prevented further outbreaks is disputed; the Museum of London identifies this as a common myth about the fire.

On Charles' initiative, a Monument to the Great Fire of London was erected near Pudding Lane, designed by Christopher Wren and Robert Hooke, standing 61 1/2 metres (202 ft) tall, between 1671 and 1676. In 1681, accusations against the Catholics were added to the inscription on the Monument which read, in part, "Popish frenzy which wrought such horrors, is not yet quenched". The inscription remained until after the passage of the Roman Catholic Relief Act 1829 when it was removed in 1830 following a successful campaign by City Solicitor Charles Pearson. Another monument marks the spot where the fire is said to have died out: the Golden Boy of Pye Corner in Smithfield.

Although it was never implemented, Wren's plan for the rebuilding of London has itself had a significant cultural impact. The decision not to implement the plan was criticised by later authors such as Daniel Defoe and was frequently cited by advocates for public health. It also featured heavily in textbooks for the nascent discipline of city planning and was referenced by reports on the reconstruction of London after the Second World War. Wren presenting the plan was the subject of a Royal Mail stamp issued in 2016, one of six in a set commemorating the 350th anniversary of the Great Fire.

Cultural responses to the Great Fire emerged in poetry, "one of the chief modes of media in seventeenth-century England", as well as in religious sermons. At least 23 poems were published in the year following the fire. More recent cultural works featuring the Great Fire include the 1841 novel Old St. Paul's the 2006 novel Forged in the Fire, the 2014 television drama The Great Fire, and the musical Bumblescratch, which was performed as part of the commemorations of the 350th anniversary of the Great Fire.

== See also ==
- 1666 in England
- List of buildings that survived the Great Fire of London
