= Exchange Building =

Exchange Building may refer to:

== United States ==
- Exchange Building (Memphis), Tennessee
- Exchange Building (Newark, Delaware)
- Exchange Building (San Antonio), Texas
- Exchange Building (Petersburg, Virginia)
- Exchange Building (Seattle), Washington

== Elsewhere ==
- Exchange Building, Toowoomba, Australia
- Exchange Buildings, an alternate name for La Borsa, Valletta, Malta
- Exchange Building, Dunedin, New Zealand
- The Exchange Building, London, England

== See also ==
- Corn exchange, building where merchants trade grains
- Exchange Bank Building (disambiguation)
- Livestock Exchange Building (disambiguation)
- Merchants Exchange Building (disambiguation)
- Exchange Tower, Toronto, Ontario
