= Exchange =

Exchange or exchanged may refer to:

== Arts, entertainment and media ==
=== Film and television ===
- Exchange (film), or Deep Trap, 2015 South Korean psychological thriller
- Exchanged (film), 2019 Peruvian fantasy comedy
- Exchange (TV program), 2021 South Korean dating reality show

=== Gaming ===
- Exchange (chess), closely related captures of pieces of both players in chess
  - The exchange (chess), an exchange of a minor piece for a rook

=== Music ===
- Exchange, a new-age jazz band of Steve Sexton and Gerald O'Brien, and their 1992 self-titled album
- Exchange (EP), by Against All Authority and The Criminals, 1999
- "Exchange" (song), by Bryson Tiller, 2015
- "Exchange" and "(Exchange)", songs on Massive Attack's 1998 album Mezzanine (album)

== Business and economics ==
- Bureau de change, or currency exchange
- Cryptocurrency exchange, to trade cryptocurrencies or digital currencies
- Exchange (economics), in a market economy
- Exchange (organized market), where securities etc are bought and sold

== Places ==
- Exchange, Indiana, U.S.
- Exchange, Missouri, U.S.
- Exchange, Pennsylvania, U.S.
- Exchange, West Virginia, U.S.
- Exchange Alley, in London, United Kingdom
- Exchange District, a historic area in Winnipeg, Manitoba, Canada

== Science and technology ==
- .exchange, an ICANN-era generic Internet top-level domain
- Microsoft Exchange Server, mail and calendar software
- Telephone exchange, connecting telephone calls

== Other uses ==
- USS Exchange (1862), an American Civil War steamer

== See also ==
- The Exchange (disambiguation)
- Exchange Building (disambiguation)
- Exchange Hotel (disambiguation)
- Interchange (disambiguation)
- X-Change (disambiguation)
- Base exchange or Post exchange, retail store on U.S. military installations
- Columbian exchange, transfers between the Old and New Worlds
- Exchange rate, the price for which one currency is exchanged for another
- Gas exchange, by diffusion across a surface
- Internet exchange point, allowing Internet service providers to exchange data
- Prisoner exchange, or prisoner swap
- Student exchange program
- Trade, the exchange of goods or services for money or other goods or services
