= The Exchange =

The Exchange may refer to:

== Buildings ==
=== England ===
- The Exchange, Birmingham, former building in Birmingham
- The Exchange, Bristol, a historic building
- The Exchange, Twickenham, a theatre and arts venue in the London Borough of Richmond upon Thames
- Exchange Arcade, the commercial section of the Nottingham Council House
- The Exchange, a sister venue of the Hazlitt Theatre in Kent, England
- The Exchange, a building project in Croydon, a neighborhood in south London
- The Exchange, a contemporary art gallery in Penzance, Cornwall

=== Elsewhere ===
- The Exchange (La Plata, Maryland)
- The Exchange, a shopping mall owned by CapitaLand in Tianjin, China
- The Exchange TRX, a shopping mall complex in Kuala Lumpur, Malaysia

== Arts and entertainment ==
- The Exchange (Trifonov novel), a 1969 novella by Yuri Trifonov
- The Exchange: After The Firm, a 2023 novel by John Grisham
- The Exchange, a non-fiction book by Allan Levine
- The Exchange (1952 film), a West German comedy film
- The Exchange (2011 film), an Israeli film
- The Exchange (2021 film), a comedy-drama film
- The Exchange (band), an a cappella band from the US
- The Exchange (TV series), a Canadian financial news television program
- The Exchange (TV series), a Kuwaiti historical drama focused on women, the first Kuwaiti series on Netflix (2025)
- The Exchange, a recording studio in London where several Depeche Mode albums, including Ultra, were recorded

== Other uses ==
- Army and Air Force Exchange Service
- The Exchange (Canada), an interbank ATM network
- The exchange (chess), an occurrence in the game of chess

== See also ==
- Exchange (disambiguation)
