= Interchange =

Interchange may refer to:

== Transport ==
- Interchange (road), a collection of ramps, exits, and entrances between two or more highways
- Interchange (freight rail), the transfer of freight cars between railroad companies
- Interchange station, a railway station where two or more routes meet and allow passengers to change trains
- Cross-platform interchange, the transfer between trains across a station platform
- Transport interchange or transport hub to include jointly operated interchange flights by two or more airlines
- Sky lobby, a floor in a skyscraper used to change between an express elevator and a regular elevator.

== Other uses ==
- Interchange (de Kooning), a 1955 painting by Willem de Kooning
- Interchange (album), a 1994 album by guitarist Pat Martino
- Interchange (Australian rules football), a team position in Australian rules football
- Interchange circuit, a circuit that facilitates the exchange of data and signaling information
- Interchange fee, a fee paid between banks in the payment card industry
- Interchange (film), a 2016 Malaysian fantasy thriller film
- Interchange of limiting operations, the commutativity of certain mathematical operations
- Interchange, a series of ESL educational books
- Interchange, an alternative name for Substitution (sport)

== See also ==
- Interchangeability (disambiguation)
- Great American Interchange
- Exchange (disambiguation)
