= Battle of Dungeness (1666) =

1666 battle

- Part of the Second Anglo-Dutch War
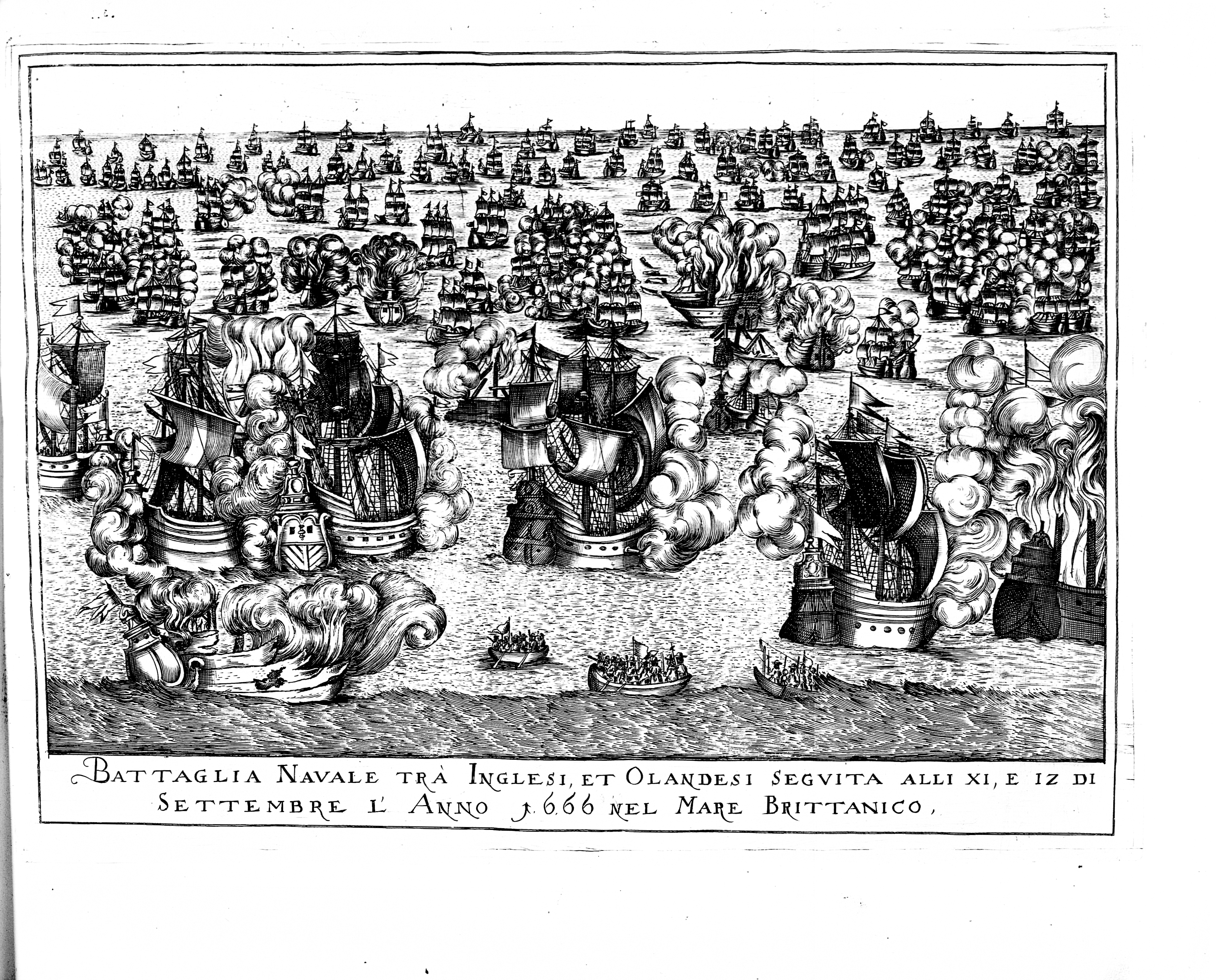
Date	17 September 1666
Location	Off Dungeness headland in English Channel
Result	English victory

Belligerents
France; Dutch Republic	(Kingdom of England) England

Commanders and leaders
(Kingdom of France) Job Forant	(Kingdom of England) Thomas Allin

Strength
14 ships	24 ships

Casualties and losses
116 killed or wounded 400 captured 1 ship captured	70 casualties

The Battle of Dungeness or the Battle of Cape Dungeness (French: Bataille du cap Dungeness) (17 September 1666) was a naval battle that took place during the Second Anglo-Dutch War. A combined French and Dutch fleet under Job Forant encountered a larger English fleet commanded by Admiral Sir Thomas Allin, 1st Baronet. The English attacked and in poor visibility a series of encounters left several French and Dutch ships badly damaged. The battle ended with the English having captured the French ship Le Rubis.

== Background ==
The Second Anglo-Dutch War had been raging for a year between the Kingdom of England and the Dutch Republic over the colonial possessions of the two countries. Most fighting involved naval encounters, which took place in European waters and the West Indies. France was allied to the Dutch Republic and Denmark. In 1666, the English fleet controlled the North Sea after its victory in the St James's Day Fight, and the Dutch had also been dealt a severe blow after the English raid known as Holmes's Bonfire.

Louis XIV of France and his general superintendent of navigation, François de Vendôme, Duc de Beaufort, had decided that it was the time to act, as the English would be distracted by the Great Fire of London, which had ended only on 5 September. Louis had ordered for the French and Dutch fleets to be united against England. A French squadron of eight ships, commanded by capitaine de vaisseau Job Forant aboard La Sophie (60 guns) had departed from Toulon and was joined by a small Dutch squadron bringing the total to fourteen ships. The Franco-Dutch fleet entered the English Channel, seeking to join the main Dutch fleet in the Netherlands. It encountered heavy weather, and off Dungeness, the fleet came across a larger English force of 25 ships under the command of Admiral Thomas Allin.

== Battle ==
Allin pursued the combined fleet, and a battle commenced. Visibility was poor and so the action was very confused. The English had the weather gage and inflicted heavy damage on the French ships Le Bourbon (66 guns) and Le Mazarin (48 guns) under Captains Rabesnières-Treillebois and Villepars respectively. Battling six English ships, they succeeded in dropping out with heavy damage and casualties and escaped to Le Havre. The French ships Le Mercœur (32 guns) and L'Oms and the Dutch Prins te Paard and Oosterwijk were forced to abandon the fight. Le Dragon (42 guns) under captain Préaux-Mercey after having been nearly surrounded by three English ships battered its way out inflicting damage and managed to make port at Dieppe.

Le Rubis, a new ship in the French Royal Navy with sixty guns, had become detached in the poor weather and sighted Allin's fleet, which thought that it was the Franco-Dutch fleet. The French captain Gilles de La Roche-Saint-André realised his mistake too late. He attempted to fight, but outnumbered, he stuck his colours and surrendered. The rest of the French and the Dutch retreated to safety.

== Aftermath ==
Gilles de La Roche-Saint-André, who had fought off Lisbon to help Prince Rupert of the Rhine when he took refuge there in 1650, was treated honourably by his English captors and was immediately released by order of Charles II. The Duke of York offered him a sword before his repatriation to France. His reputation at the French Court was such that he was appointed as chef d'escadre in the French Royal Navy in 1667. Louis, however, was disenchanted with the Duc de Beaufort for his failure to unite with the Dutch fleet.

The Rubis was taken into service as HMS French Ruby and served in the English Navy until 1686.

== Sources ==
- William Laird, Clowes; Clements Robert, Markham (1996). The Royal Navy: A History from the Earliest Times to the Present, Volume 2 (reprint ed.). London: Chatham. ISBN 9781861760111.
- Jones, J.R (2013). The Anglo-Dutch Wars of the Seventeenth Century Modern Wars In Perspective. Routledge. ISBN 9781317899488.
