= Mason Street School Museum =

Historical Landmark in San Diego, California, United States

Mason Street Schoolhouse
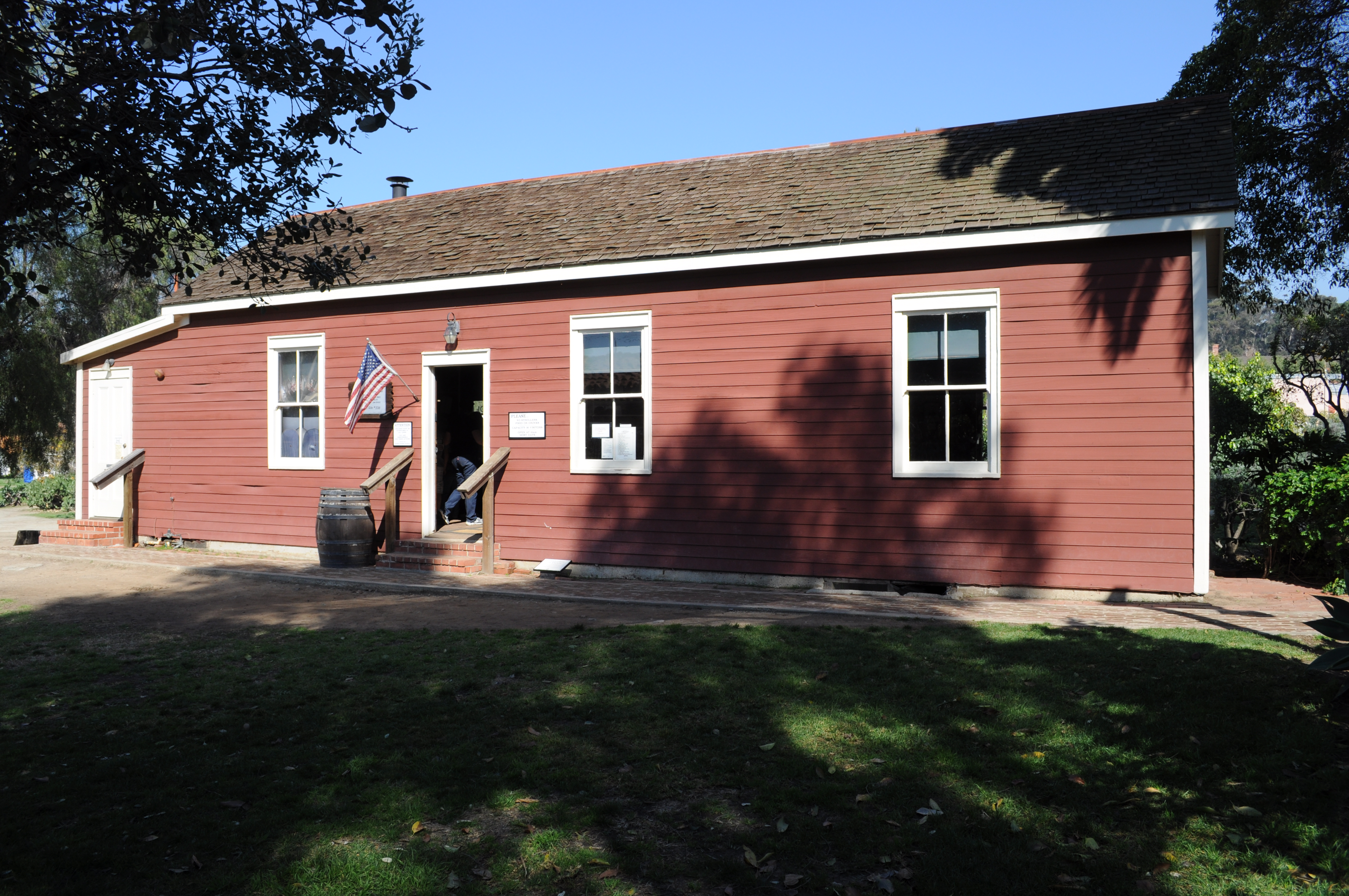
- San Diego Mason Street School Museum

- Location within California Location within the United States
- 32.753°N 117.197°W
- Location: 3966 Mason Street; San Diego, California

History
- Built: 1865

California Historical Landmark
- Designated: September 14, 1955
- Reference no.: 538

Mason Street Schoolhouse is a historical building in San Diego, California, built in 1865. The Mason Street School District No. 1 is a California Historical Landmark No. 538, listed on September 14, 1955. The school building, now hosting the Mason Street School Museum, is in Old Town, San Diego, at 3966 Mason Street.

The Mason Street School was the first publicly owned school in San Diego. It was used from 1865 to 1872. The schoolhouse was moved once. For some time in the 1940s to 1952, the schoolhouse was a tamale restaurant, which operated out of the building until 1952. In 1952, the San Diego County Historical Days Association acquired the schoolhouse, and it was restored in 1955. The State of California acquired the schoolhouse in 2013.

The schoolhouse is 24 feet by 30 feet, 720 square feet with a 10-foot ceiling. The first teacher was Mary Chase Walker (1828–1899) born in Massachusetts. Walker graduated in 1861 from State Normal School in Framingham, Massachusetts, and had a job teaching in Massachusetts. At the end of the American Civil War in 1865, Walker came to San Francisco, not finding a job there she traveled to San Diego. She took the teaching job for $65 a month (about $1,224.00 a month in today's dollars). Walker had 35 students of ages 4 to 17 in the single one-room schoolhouse. Walker had the job for 11 months when Walker married the school superintendent Ephraim Morse.

A historical marker was place as the site by the San Diego County Board of Supervisors and the Historical Markers Committee in 1955.

== Gallery ==
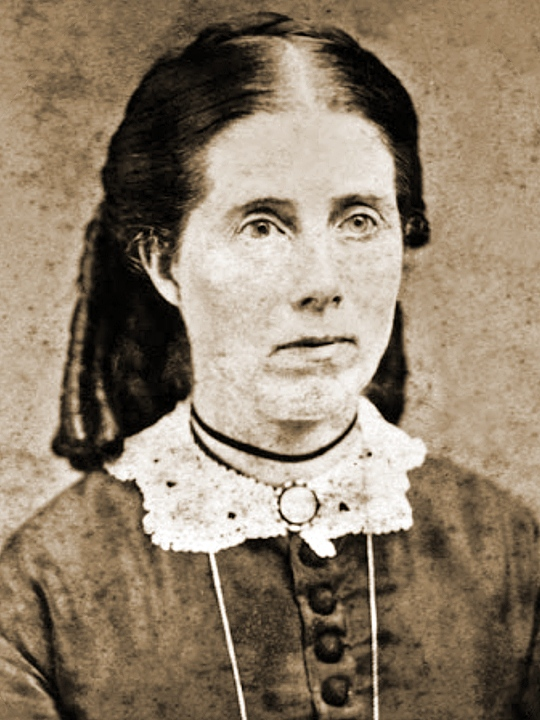
Mary Chase Walker first teacher at Mason Street School

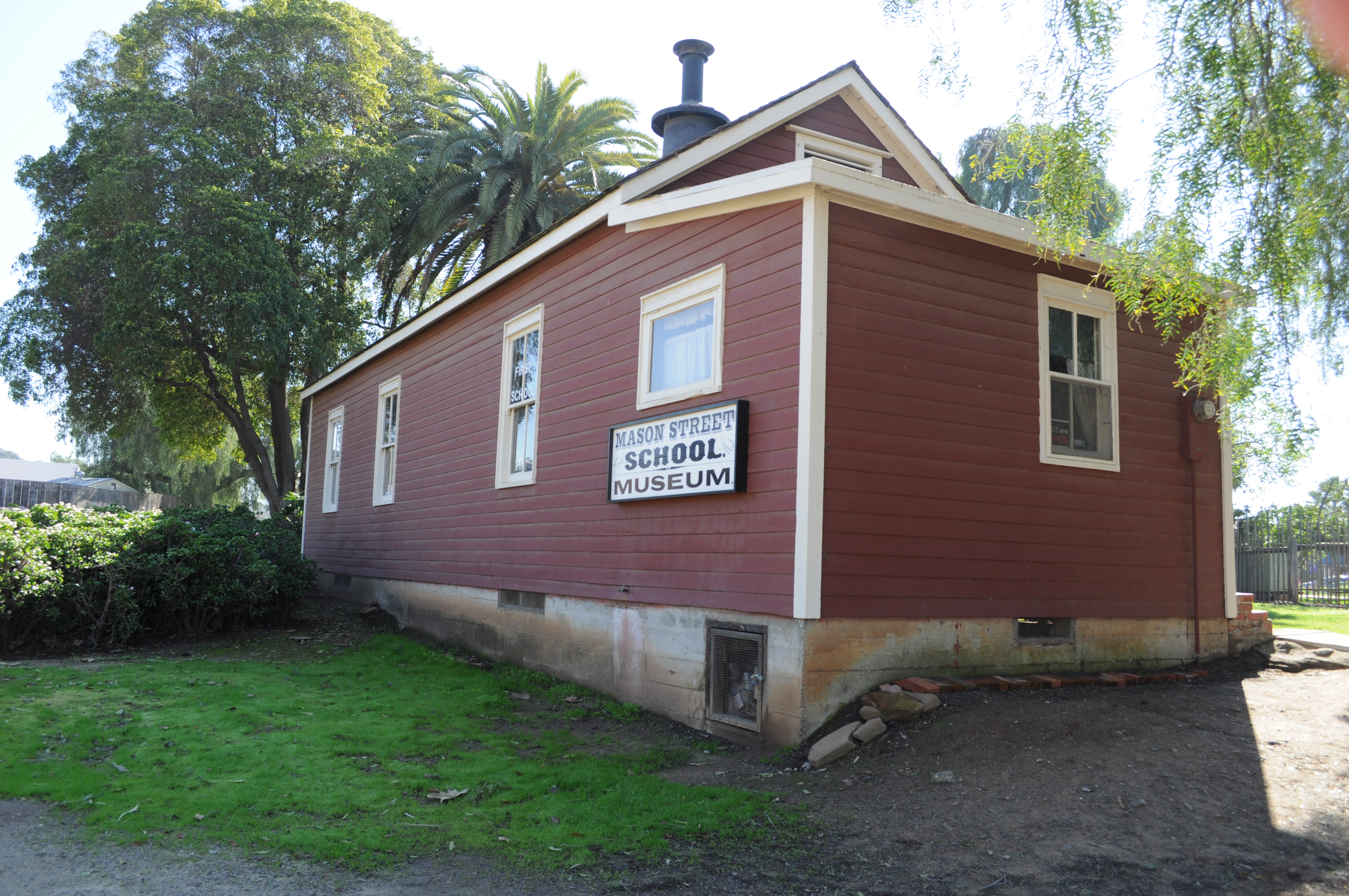
San Diego Mason Street School Museum

== See also ==
- California Historical Landmarks in San Diego County
- Adobe Chapel of The Immaculate Conception
- Casa de Carrillo House
- Casa de Estudillo
- Casa de Cota
