= Exchange Bank Building =

Exchange Bank Building may refer to:

- Exchange Bank Building (Tallahassee, Florida)
- Exchange Bank Building (Farmington, Minnesota)

== See also ==
- Exchange Building (disambiguation)
