= Ephraim Morse =

Ephraim W. Morse
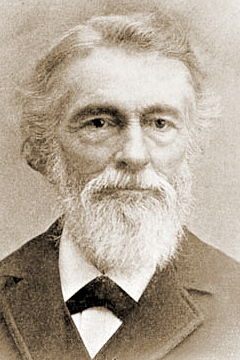
- Born: October 16, 1823; Merrimac, Massachusetts
- Died: January 17, 1906 (aged 82); San Diego, California
- Spouse: Mary Chase Walker (1866–99; her death)

Ephraim W. Morse (October 16, 1823 – January 17, 1906) was an early settler of the city of San Diego, and was partially responsible for many of its expansions as a city, such as attracting the Atchison, Topeka and Santa Fe Railway and proposing Balboa Park.

== Early life ==
Morse was born in 1823 in West Amesbury, Massachusetts (incorporated in 1876 as Merrimac, Massachusetts). He lived there as a farmer and teacher until 1848, when news of the California gold rush took the United States by storm.

== Ship charter to San Francisco ==
He decided to form a company to charter a ship and gather materials for a voyage to the gold fields. He later stated that "this company was intended to be, and was, a select company. No one could join without presenting satisfactory recommendations from the selectmen of the town, the mayor of their city, or some prominent preacher." It was indeed a stringent organization, in which each member had to give their time and interests to the company rather than themselves, nor could they assume pecuniary liabilities without company approval, or drink or gamble, all under penalty of a fine. Labor on the Sabbath was also prohibited unless of urgent necessity. However, members would be cared for in sickness, and in case of death buried at the company's expense. The members mainly consisted of Morse's friends, relatives, and associates. By early 1849 they managed to charter a ship, the Leonora, and on February 4, 1849, they set sail for San Francisco, arriving on July 5. The members then dispersed to the mines on the Yuba River north of Sacramento. However, Morse and his partner, Levi Slack, could not cope with the California summer heat. Then they heard about the small town of San Diego, far to the south near the U.S.-Mexico border.

== Move to San Diego ==
The two had both read Two Years Before the Mast by fellow Massachusetts native Richard Henry Dana Jr., about his voyage by sea to California, spending much time in San Diego, then a small Mexican pueblo. They decided to resettle there for the time being. In April 1850 the two arrived, and opened a store in the settlement of Davistown on San Diego Bay. When Davistown faltered, they relocated to the main center of town, further north on the San Diego River near the old Spanish presidio (fortress).

After a year, Morse found himself recuperated, and decided to return to Massachusetts. Despite a rough voyage via Nicaragua, he returned safely to his hometown of West Amesbury, where he met and married a local woman, Lydia A. Gray. The two lived there until he heard of the sudden death of Levi Slack back in San Diego. He then returned alone to attend his friend's funeral, then came back again in May 1852.

However, the couple had become drawn to the young city's dry, warm climate, and the following year made the journey West again, this time permanently. They were joined by Thomas Whaley and his wife, from New York City. Morse and Whaley jointly operated a store in the town center until 1856, when they split up. In 1859, Morse left San Diego for the open farmland of Palomar Mountain, where he became a farmer and rancher. Morse was also established in beekeeping. He was one of the first commercial beekeepers in the San Diego area and had several hundred hives in various operations.

In 1861, Morse returned to San Diego and started a new business as a merchant, as well as a Wells Fargo express agent, making a name for himself as a prominent local man. In June 1869, he moved to the new development of Horton's Addition, also known as New Town, organized and promoted by the successful land merchant Alonzo Horton. Although many residents of the former town center (known to this day as Old Town) were angered, the new site became the focus of the growing town because it was located on the bay, providing easier access for shipping. He was subsequently joined by Philip Crosthwaite, another early Anglo resident of San Diego. Morse, in conjunction with Horton, did much to promote the new downtown on the water.

== Development of San Diego ==
From the beginning of his time in San Diego, Morse took an active role in local political affairs. In 1852 he was elected associate judge of the court of sessions, and also that year to the secretary of the board of trade, as which he served for 12 years. From 1858–1859 he served as San Diego County treasurer, and again from 1861–1863. From 1866–1867 he served as city trustee, in which capacity he sold many lands to Horton. He also served as public administrator from 1876 to 1877. However, he did not wish to become a politician, and only served in public office if he felt it would be necessary. Thus he did not seek any higher office.

However, his varied efforts did much to promote San Diego's name throughout the nation and help it mature into a thriving metropolis. In 1870, he organized the city's first bank, the Bank of San Diego, and in 1871 he went to Washington, DC to present information about San Diego's pueblo land interests. Like many local businessmen, he gained much wealth during the city's land boom in the early and mid-1880s, only to lose much of it when the boom collapsed at the end of the decade.

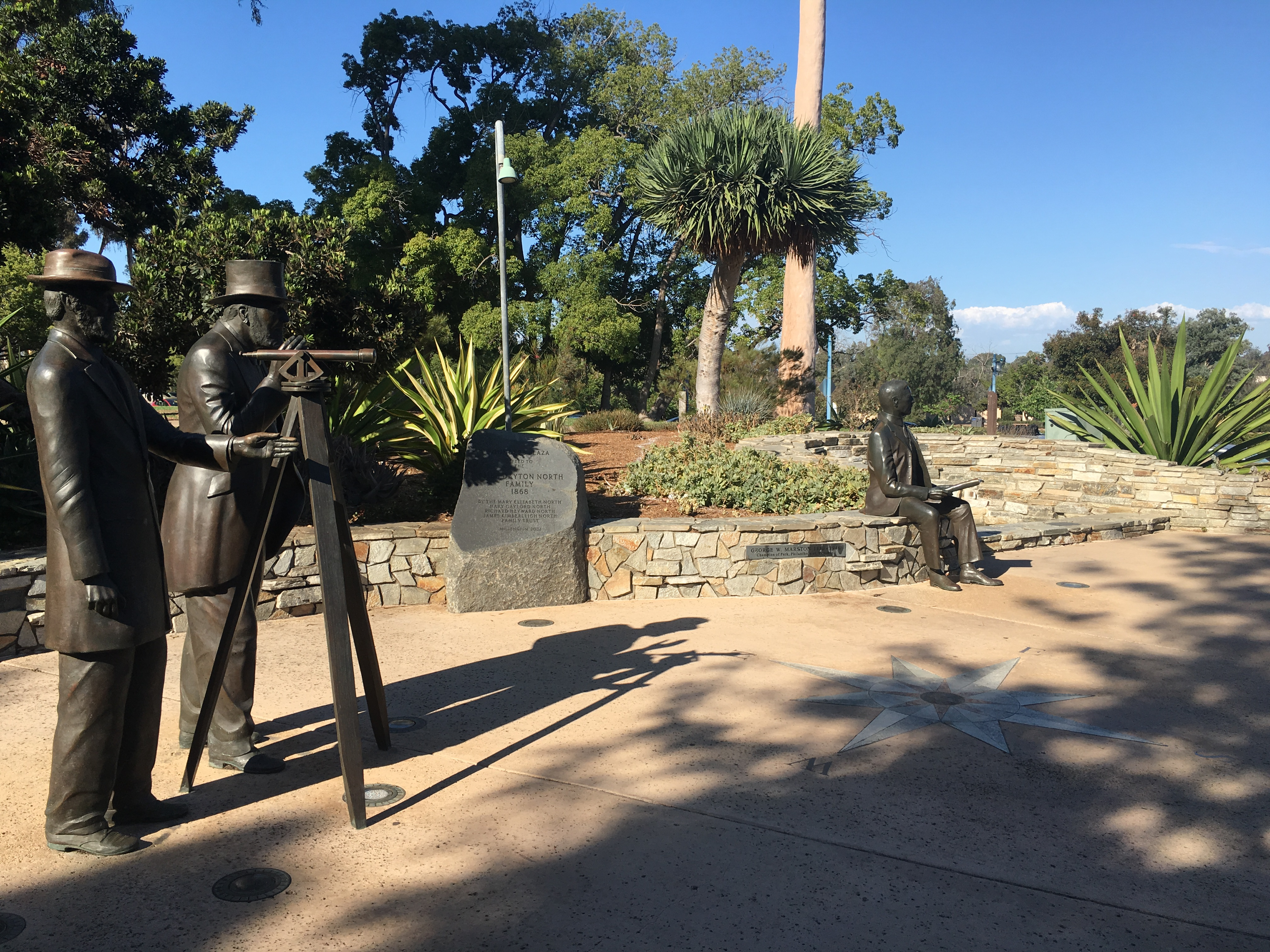
A statue of Ephraim Morse, far left, in Sefton Plaza of San Diego, California's Balboa Park.

He also became a tireless promoter of attracting a railroad to the steadily growing city, starting by organizing the San Diego & Gila Railroad Company. In October 1879, while he was serving on the Citizens' Committee, representatives of the Santa Fe Railroad visited San Diego, and Morse enthusiastically promoted the city's virtues. The railroad company was soon convinced, and in 1881, the California Southern Railroad, a subsidiary of the Atchison, Topeka and Santa Fe Railway, began building a line northward from San Diego to connect with the Atlantic and Pacific Railroad in present-day Barstow in 1885. The rail connections to Los Angeles were completed by 1887.

Morse was also admitted to the bar in 1856, and from 1880 to 1886 he capitalized on San Diego's growing land interests as a member of the real estate firm Morse, Whaley & Dalton. He also invested much and heavily promoted the San Diego Flume Company, which helped provide much-needed water for the arid city.

One of his most lasting achievements was the promotion of local open space for public enjoyment, resulting in the current Balboa Park, one of the city's most beloved attractions. He joined with Alonzo Horton in 1868 to propose the establishment of a park reserve of 1400 acres; the San Diego Board of Trustees adopted the proposal and the land became the nucleus of City Park, later renamed Balboa Park.

== Personal life ==
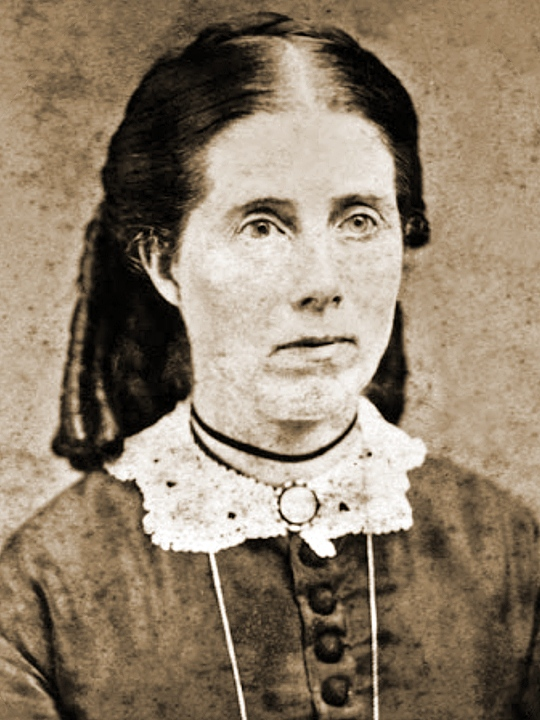
Mary Chase Walker

Morse's first wife, Lydia, died in Old Town in 1856. In 1865, Morse brought New Hampshire schoolteacher Mary Chase Walker to serve in the local school, Mason Street School in San Diego, California. The two married on December 20, 1866. By his first wife he had one son, Edward, who eventually resettled in newly incorporated Merrimac, Massachusetts, formerly West Amesbury. Morse died on January 17, 1906.

== Bibliography ==
- Christman, Florence (1985). The Romance of Balboa Park (4th ed.). San Diego: San Diego Historical Society. ISBN 0-918740-03-7.
