= Mary Chase Walker =

American educator, pioneer, and suffragette (1828–1899)

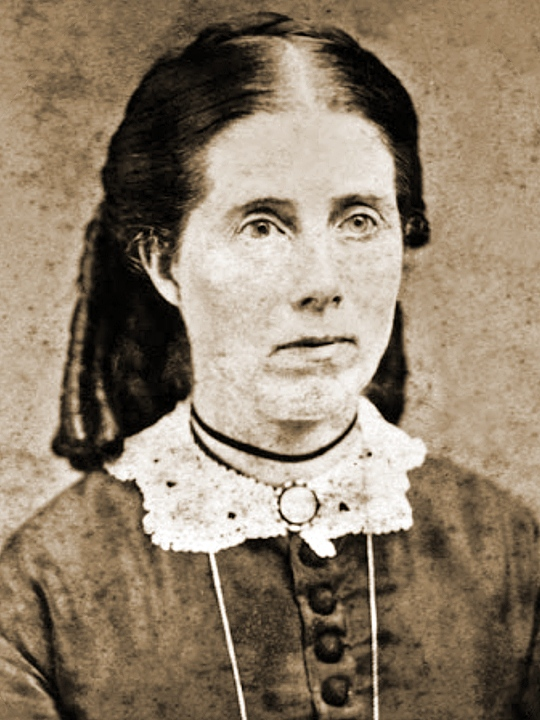
- Born: Mary Chase Walker; 1828; Methuen, Massachusetts, U.S.
- Died: May 17, 1899 (aged 70–71); San Diego, California, U.S.
- Other name: Mary C. Morse
- Occupations: Teacher, activist
- Known for: Controversy which became known as the "Walker Incident"
- Notable work: Recollections of Early Times in San Diego (1898)
- Spouse: Ephraim Weed Morse (m. 1866)

Mary Chase Walker, Mrs. Morse (1828 – May 17, 1899) was an American schoolteacher, pioneer, and suffragette. In 1865 she became the first school teacher at Mason Street Schoolhouse, the first public school to be built in San Diego County, California. She recorded her Recollections of Early Times in San Diego in 1898.

== Early life ==
Walker was born in 1828 in Methuen, Massachusetts. At age 15 she worked as a teacher in Groton, New Hampshire, where she taught at a district school, boarding with families in the community. Her initial salary was $4. It increased substantially, to $400, after Walker graduated from The State Normal School (now Framingham State University) in Framingham, Massachusetts, in 1861. Her pay was soon cut in half due to the outbreak of the American Civil War.

== Career ==
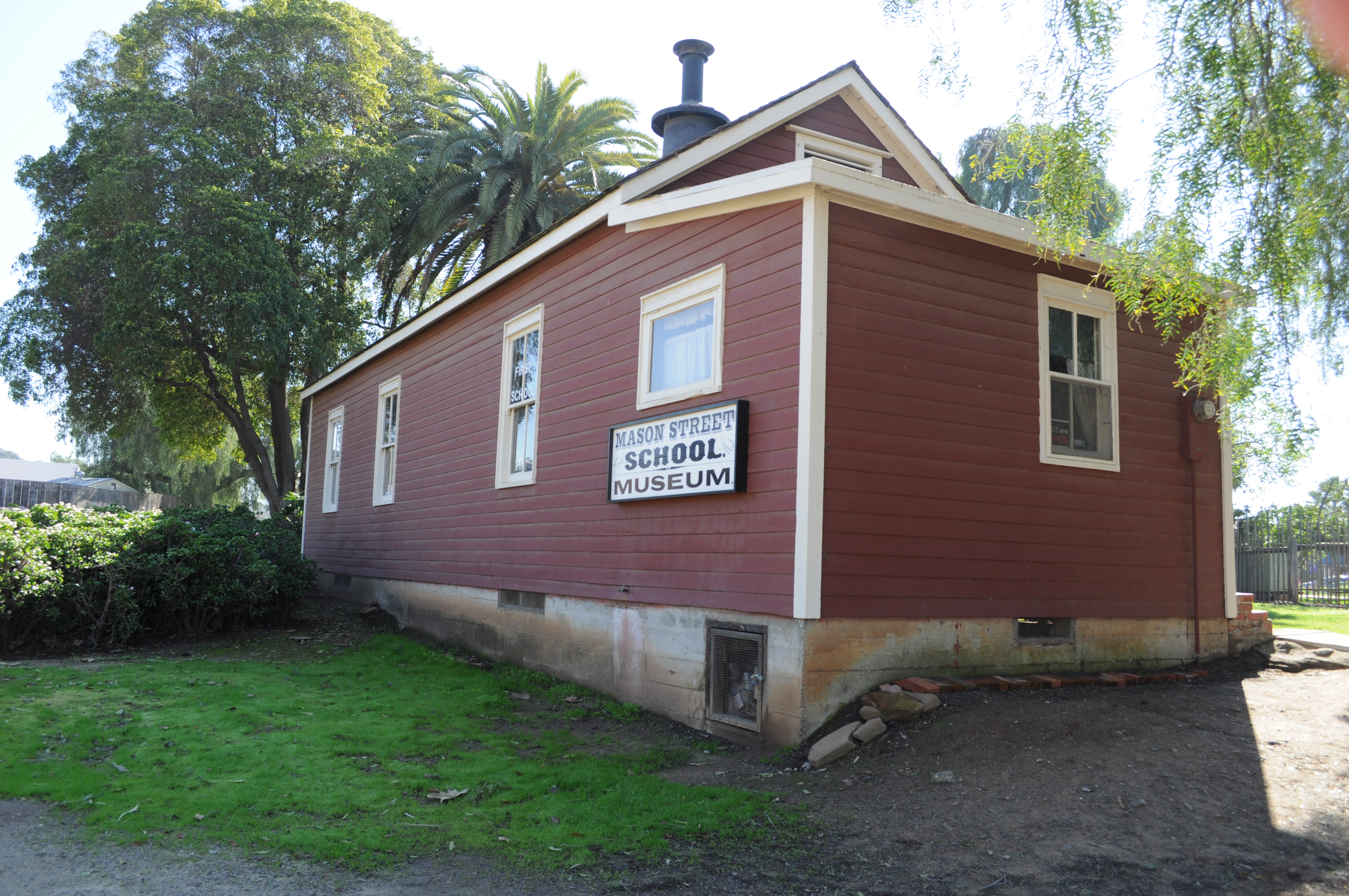
Mason Street School, San Diego

In April 1865, Walker left New York by steamer to travel to seek work in San Francisco. She suffered from sea sickness during the trip. When she disembarked in San Francisco, Walker was told that the only position available to her was in San Diego.

=== Teacher ===
After arriving in San Diego on July 5, 1865, Walker became the first teacher of the newly constructed Mason Street School. Walker was paid $65 a month. The Mason Street schoolhouse was the first public school to be built in San Diego County, and taught 35 students of ages 4 to 17 in a single classroom. Walker recalled: "My school was composed mostly of Spanish and half-breed children with a few English and several Americans. Many American soldiers and some sailors had come to San Diego in the early days and married pretty senoritas".

=== Controversy: Walker Incident ===
After an 11-month term at Mason Street, she was involved in a controversy which became known as the "Walker Incident". Walker met a stewardess who had helped her when she was seasick during her trip to San Francisco, and invited her to lunch at the Franklin House hotel. The stewardess is variously described as black, of mixed racial origin, or quadroon.

This led to patrons walking out in disgust. Many of her students' parents considered her actions improper, and boycotted her classroom. The trustees of the San Diego School Board were divided in their opinion of her conduct. At the height of the controversy, Walker became engaged to senior trustee Ephraim Weed Morse and resigned her position after the 1866 spring semester.

=== Post Teaching in School ===
After retirement from teaching in public school, Walker did much work towards the suffragette movement and helping impoverished people. Walker became a private teacher for Rufina Porter, the daughter of Rufus Porter, a Spring Valley pioneer. Walker wrote articles for newspaper.

In 1898, the year before her death, she published a paper entitled Recollections of Early Times in San Diego.

== Personal life ==
At the height of the controversy, Walker became engaged to Ephraim Weed Morse, a senior trustee, and resigned her position as a teacher after the 1866 spring semester.

On December 20, 1866, Walker married Ephraim Morse, the school board president. Walker is also known as Mary C. Morse. Walker enjoyed gardening and camping with her husband. On May 17, 1899, Walker died in San Diego, California, U.S.

=== Legacy ===
On October 16, 1972, Mary Chase Walker Elementary School, on Hillery Drive in the Mira Mesa neighborhood of San Diego, opened in her honor. Estelle Lauer, vice president for programs at Lemon Grove Historical Society said of her in 2014: "She bridged America east and west, as well as past and present. As an emigrant American, she is an ideal figure for this season’s lecture theme, Coming to California: The Immigrant Experience."

In 2014, the Lemon Grove Historical Society keeps Walker's memory alive in the "History Alive" lecture series.
