= Exchange Hotel =

Exchange Hotel may refer to:

== Australia ==
Alphabetical by state, then town

- Exchange Hotel (Balmain), in Sydney, New South Wales
- Exchange Hotel, Laidley, heritage-listed in Queensland
- Exchange Hotel, Mossman, heritage-listed in Queensland
- Exchange Hotel, Kalgoorlie, heritage-listed in Western Australia

== United States ==
Alphabetical by state, then town

- Exchange Hotel, Montgomery, in Alabama
- Exchange Hotel (San Diego, California)
- Exchange Hotel (Milton, Florida), listed on the National Register of Historic Places (NRHP) in Santa Rosa County
- Exchange Hotel (Cardington, Ohio), NRHP-listed in Morrow County
- Exchange Hotel (Sandusky, Ohio), NRHP-listed in Sandusky
- Exchange Hotel (Gordonsville, Virginia), NRHP-listed
- Exchange Hotel (Richmond, Virginia)

== See also ==
- Royal Exchange Hotel, Brisbane, heritage-listed in Brisbane, Queensland, Australia
