= X-Change =

XChange or X-Change may refer to:

- XChange (film), a 2000 Canadian science fiction film
- Xchange (TV series), was a BBC Children's television programme
- X-Change, a Chinese spin-off of Wife Swap (British TV series)

== See also ==
- Exchange (disambiguation)
- Monét X Change (Kevin Akeem Bertin, born 1990), American drag queen
