= French ship Rubis (1664) =

Ship of the line of the French Navy

History

France
- Name: Rubis
- Builder: Laurent Hubac, at Brest Dockyard
- Laid down: early 1662
- Launched: November 1664
- Completed: January 1665
- Captured: September 1666 by HMS Royal James
- Fate: Hulked in January 1686 at Portsmouth and taken to pieces

General characteristics
- Class & type: 60-gun ship of the line
- Tonnage: 800 tons
- Length: 135 French feet (Note: The French (pre-metric) foot was 6.575% longer than the equivalent English foot.)
- Beam: 35 French feet
- Draught: 17½ French feet
- Depth of hold: 16 French feet
- Propulsion: Sails
- Sail plan: Full-rigged ship
- Complement: 350, + 5/9 officers
- Armament: 60 guns comprising: 6 × 24-pounders + 18 × 18-pounders on the lower deck; 22 × 12-pounders on the middle deck; 10 × 6-pounders on the upper deck (6 aft and 4 forward, with no midship guns at this level); 4 × 4-pounders on the poop

Rubis was a 60-gun ship of the line of the French Navy. She was designed and built by Laurent Hubac in Brest Dockyard between 1662 and 1665. She was captured by the English Navy in September 1666 at the Battle off Dungeness and added to the English Navy, with which she served for the next 19 years,
