= Exchange Hotel (San Diego, California) =

Historical Landmark in San Diego, California, United States

- Franklin House (Exchange Hotel) in 1869 the tall three-story building

- Location within California Location within the United States
- 32.7537°N 117.1963°W
- Location: 2729 San Diego Avenue; San Diego, California

History
- Built: 1851

Site notes
- Architect(s): Racine & Laramie Tobacconist

California Historical Landmark
- Designated: October 10, 1951
- Reference no.: 491

The Exchange Hotel, also called Franklin House, is a historical building in San Diego, California, built-in 1851 by George P. Tebbetts and his partner Philip Hooff. It is first mentioned in the May 29, 1851 issue of the San Diego Herald where the "Exchange Hotel and Billiard Saloon" is advertised to carry "the choicest wines, liquors, segars... (sic)." Soon after, on June 29, 1851, a group of Freemasons met in the hotel to commemorate John the Baptist, their patron saint. This group began Freemasons San Diego Lodge No. 35, F. & A.M., the oldest lodge in Southern California.

Lewis Franklin, cousin of Selim Franklin who had built the Franklin House in San Francisco, had come to San Diego by 1851. On July 19, 1855 he bought the hotel. In November of that year it was renamed Franklin House. Its ground floor was brick, fronted by a verandah that rose the entirety of the building's three stories. By 1858, the hotel had moved into the hands of Joseph Reiner, who renewed the bedding and furniture. Freemasons continued to hold meetings there and at some point Joseph Mannasse, an early mason in San Diego, subsequently owned Franklin House. After Franklin House was lost in an April 1872 fire, the site was a vacant lot for some time. The Exchange Hotel site became a California Historical Landmark No. 491, listed on October 10, 1951.

== See also ==
- Mary Chase Walker (Walker Incident)
