= The Exchange Building =

Exchange Building
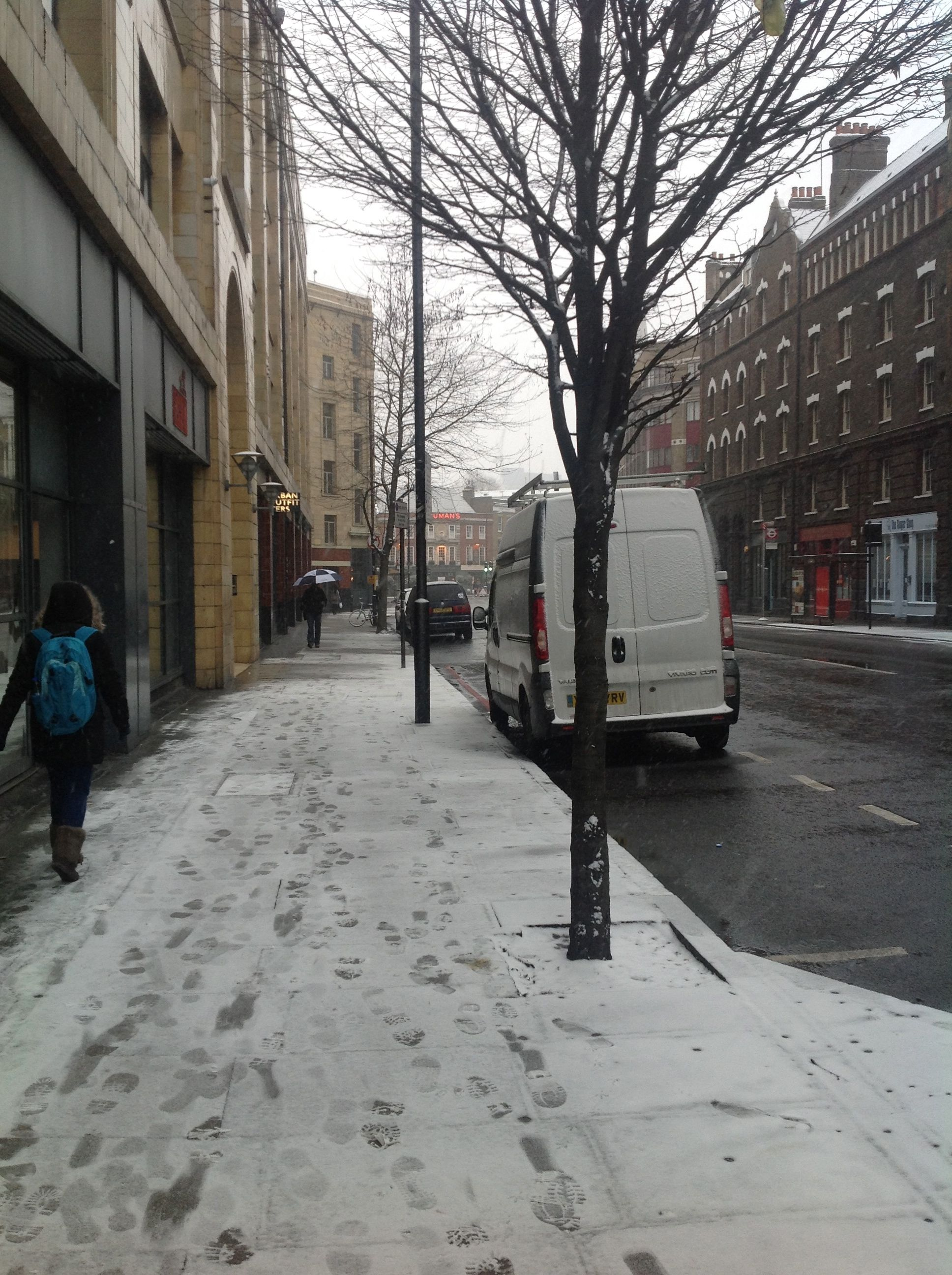
- Interactive map of the Exchange Building area

General information
- Location: 132 Commercial Street, London, United Kingdom, A1202 Inner London Ring Road
- Coordinates: 51.521268°N 0.074953°W
- Construction started: 1922
- Completed: 1936

Height
- Roof: 125 metres (410 ft)

Technical details
- Floor count: 8
- Floor area: 475,000 square feet (44,128.9 m^{2})

Design and construction
- Architect: W Gilbee Scott & BWH Scott
- Main contractor: Contractor

The Exchange Building is a residential building in London named after the original purpose of the building, which was to be a Telephone Exchange for British Telecom. In the end BT never used the building instead using a building immediately behind in Jerome St - 1928 by the Office of Works. The Exchange Building is located on the A1202 Inner London Arterial Ring Road at 132 Commercial Street in Tower Hamlets.

The Exchange Building stands opposite the Peabody building and is 20 metres (66 ft) tall, with 8 storeys. The building features the original metal and glass window design, which was intended to resemble the original Telephone Exchange style, with residential flats on each floor. The Exchange Building benefits from 24-hour porters as well as an underground car park.

== History ==
Built in 1936 on the former site of the Royal Cambridge Music Hall, it was originally a sleek and showier extension of the former tobacco works of Godfrey Philips & Son trading at 116 Commercial St. It was rebuilt and extended by W. Gilbee Scott and BWH Scott in 1922-5 and with faience facings in 1927. Above the central entrance, raised attic with Art Deco fluting and clock. The top storey was added in 1998-9 when converted to residential apartments.

The building was the first in a wave of converted residential buildings in East London, as the Tower Hamlets area was gentrified at the turn of the 21st century.

== See also ==
- Spitalfields
- Brick Lane
