= Merchants Exchange Building =

Merchants Exchange Building can refer to:

- 55 Wall Street, New York, formerly the Merchants' Exchange Building
- Merchants' Exchange Building (Philadelphia)
- Merchants Exchange Building (San Francisco)
- Merchants Exchange Building (St. Louis)
- Merchants Exchange (Boston)
- Merchants' Exchange Building (Baltimore, Maryland)

== See also ==
- Royal Exchange (New York), later known as Merchants Exchange
