= Interchangeability =

Interchangeability can refer to:

- Interchangeable parts, the ability to select components for assembly at random and fit them together within proper tolerances
- Interchangeability (computer science), the ability that an object can be replaced by another object without affecting code using the object
- Interchangeable random variables in mathematics
