= The Exchange, Twickenham =

Theatre and arts venue in London, England

Coordinates: 51.45005°N 0.33133°W

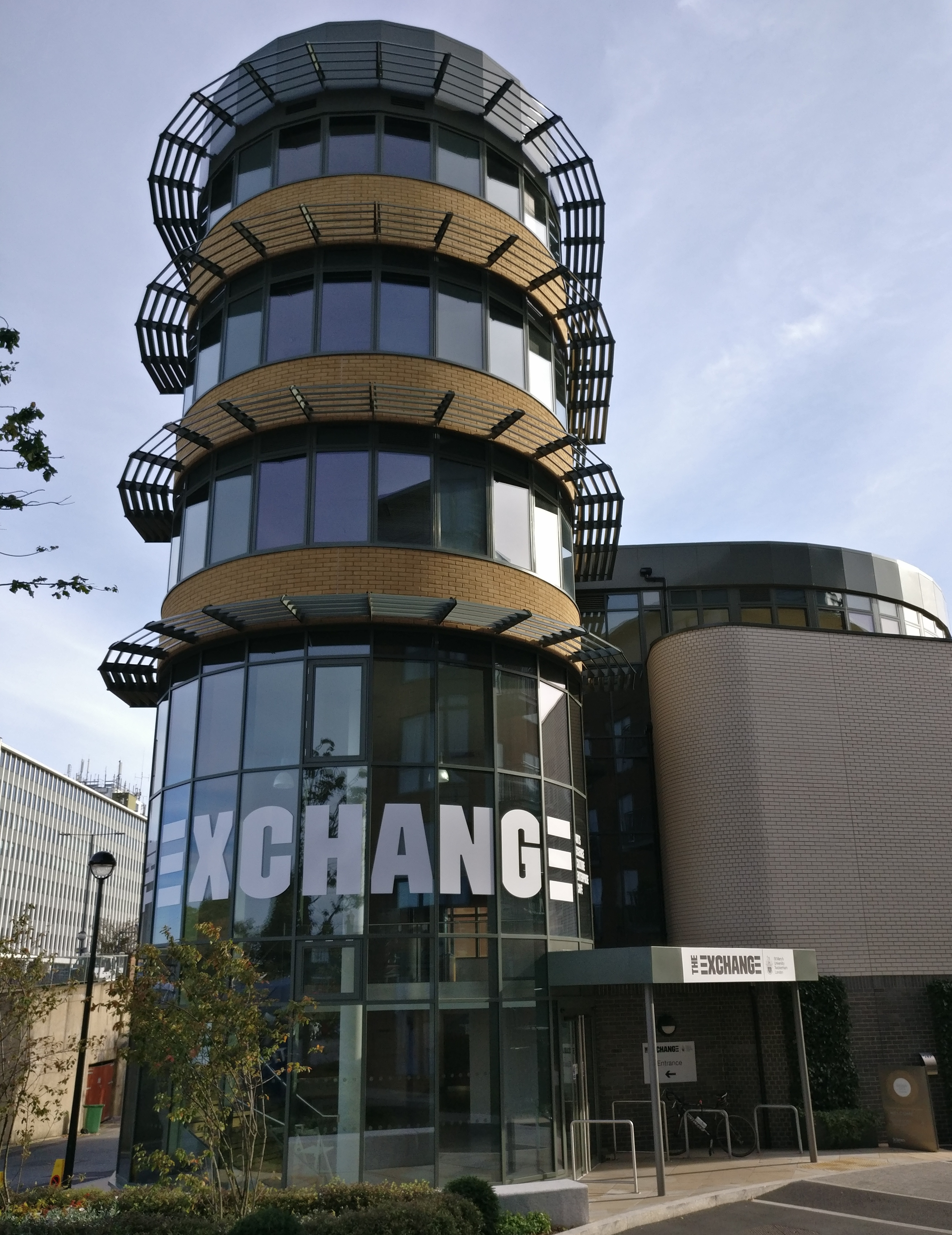
The Exchange, Twickenham

The Exchange, Twickenham is a community building, including a 285-seat theatre, at Brewery Wharf opposite Twickenham railway station in the London Borough of Richmond upon Thames. It opened in October 2017. The building is owned by Richmond upon Thames Council and is managed by St Mary's University, Twickenham.

Its programme includes theatre, music, classes, NT Live Cinema Screenings, film screenings by the local Twickenham Cinema Club, and folk music events organised in partnership with TwickFolk.
