= Livestock Exchange Building =

Livestock Exchange Building may refer to:

- Kansas City Live Stock Exchange, Kansas City, Missouri
- Livestock Exchange Building, part of the NRHP-listed Fort Worth Stockyards, Fort Worth, Texas
- Livestock Exchange Building (St. Joseph, Missouri)
- Livestock Exchange Building (Omaha, Nebraska)
