= Sir Thomas Allin, 1st Baronet =

Admiral of the White Sir Thomas Allin Bt
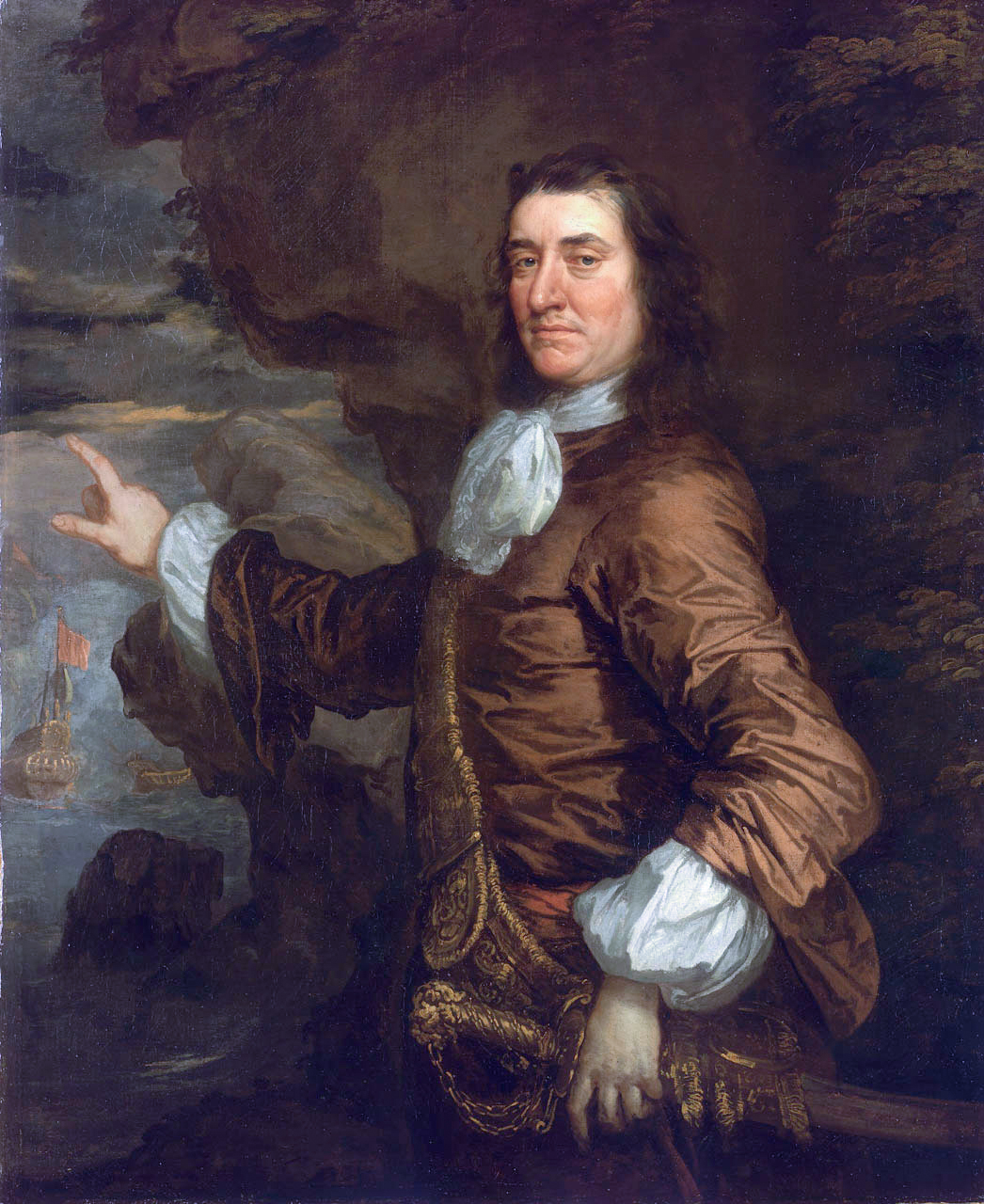
- Portrait by Sir Peter Lely, 1665
- Born: 1612
- Died: 1685 (aged 72–73)
- Military career
- Allegiance: England
- Branch: Royal Navy
- Service years: 1617–1685
- Rank: Admiral of the White
- Commands: HMS Dover; HMS Plymouth; HMS Foresight; HMS Lion; HMS Rainbow; HMS St Andrew; Downs Station; Comptroller of the Navy
- Conflicts: Battle of Lowestoft; Four Days Battle; St. James's Day Battle

Admiral of the White Sir Thomas Allin, 1st Baronet (1612 – 1685) was Royal Navy officer who served in the English Civil War and the Second and Third Anglo-Dutch Wars. A Royalist during the Civil War, he returned to service after the Stuart Restoration and eventually rose to the rank of Admiral of the White after serving under some of the most distinguished military figures of the era, including Prince Rupert of the Rhine.

== Family and early life ==
Thomas Allin was born in 1612, the son of Robert Allin. He lived at what is now 29/30 High Street (this was one property at the time) in Lowestoft for the first part of his life, where he was a merchant and shipowner. On the outbreak of the English Civil War in 1642, Allin sided with the Royalists, in common with most of the town. He played a significant part in the subsequent privateering operations against Lowestoft's Parliamentarian rivals at Great Yarmouth, and eventually transferred his operations to the Netherlands for greater security. He remained in the service of Prince Rupert of the Rhine in the exiled royalist fleet after the Civil War, as evidenced by the issuing of Prince Rupert's Further Instructions for Captain Thomas Allen [sic]. He commanded the Royalists' Charles in 1648 until her capture in 1649, and subsequently commanded the Convertine in 1650. Allin was rewarded for his loyalty to the monarchy after the English Restoration by being given command of HMS Dover on 24 June 1660. He went on to command HMS Plymouth and HMS Foresight during 1661, HMS Lion during 1662 and HMS Rainbow during 1663. During 1663 he was made Commander-in-Chief, the Downs with the rank of commodore, flying his pennant aboard HMS St Andrew from 15 April 1664.

== Command ==
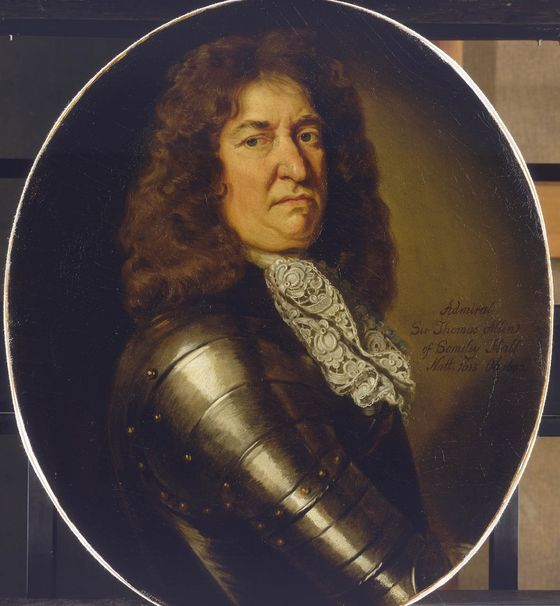
c. 1680 portrait of Allin by Sir Godfrey Kneller

In 1664 Allin was nominated to succeed Sir John Lawson as commander in the Mediterranean, and sailed to take up his command aboard the Plymouth from 26 June, and in company with HMS Crown. He operated out of Tangier initially, and while operating in the Straits of Gibraltar he and his fleet intercepted and engaged the Dutch Smyrna fleet on 9 December, capturing and sinking several of the Dutch ships. Allin returned to England in the spring of 1665, and took part in the Battle of Lowestoft on 13 June 1665. For his achievements he was awarded a knighthood on 24 June and was appointed an Admiral of the Blue squadron under the Earl of Sandwich. He flew his flag in HMS Royal James from 19 July 1665 and became an Admiral of the White on 16 March 1666. Prince Rupert then came aboard, with orders to take the squadron into the English Channel to intercept a French fleet believed to sailing up the Channel to join with the Dutch. Rupert retained Allin as his first captain for this assignment, but the intelligence was proved to be false, and no French fleet was found. By now though the rest of the English fleet under the Duke of Albemarle had sailed out to engage a Dutch fleet under Michiel de Ruyter, and the Four Days Battle had broken out. Rupert and Allin hurried back and met up with the harried and outnumbered English fleet on the third day, managing to hold the Dutch off long enough to allow a successful disengagement and then covering the retreat.

The next engagement with the Dutch fleet took place on 4 August 1666, at the St. James's Day Battle. Allin was in command of the van squadron, and led the attack, engaging the Dutch van throughout the day, and chasing them from the battle scene the following day, greatly contributing to the English victory. Allin was then placed in command of a squadron off Dungeness, and on 17 September after a battle with an allied French and Dutch fleet he captured the French ship Rubis, captain Gilles de La Roche-Saint-André, which was taken into service as HMS French Ruby. Allin's next command was to take over the Mediterranean forces in 1668, after the end of the Second Anglo-Dutch War, and to operate against the Barbary corsairs. A treaty was duly signed with the Algerians, but by 1669 Allin was employed again in chastising the pirates for breaches of the treaty, during which time he captured and destroyed a large number of pirate vessels. He returned to England after this and on 15 April 1671 he became Comptroller of the Navy, a post he held throughout the Third Anglo-Dutch War and continued to hold until 28 January 1680. On 7 February 1673 Allin was created a baronet for his services. He briefly returned to active service in 1678 when the threat of war with France emerged, and Allin became commander in chief of the fleet in the Narrow Seas, with HMS Royal James as his flagship. He resigned the command once the threat of war had passed.

== Later life ==
Allin retired from active service in 1678, settling at his country seat at Somerleyton Hall, Somerleyton. He also served as Captain of Sandgate Castle, and a Master of Trinity House. He died in 1685, and was buried in the parish church at Somerleyton on 5 October 1685. He had been twice married, his first marriage producing his son and heir Thomas Allin, and two daughters, and his second marriage produced another daughter.

== Notes ==
Baronetage of England
New creation	Baronet (of Blundeston); 1673–1685	Succeeded by Thomas Allin
