= San Diego Viejo Plaza =

Historical Landmark in San Diego, California, United States

San Diego Viejo Plaza Plaza de Las Armas Washington Square Pueblo de San Diego
- San Diego Viejo Plaza in 1872

- Location within California Location within the United States
- 32.754°N 117.196°W
- Location: 4098 Mason Street; Washington Square; Old Town San Diego; California

History
- Founded: 1835
- Built: 1821

Site notes
- Architectural style: Monterey Colonial

California Historical Landmark
- Designated: December 5, 1932
- Reference no.: 63

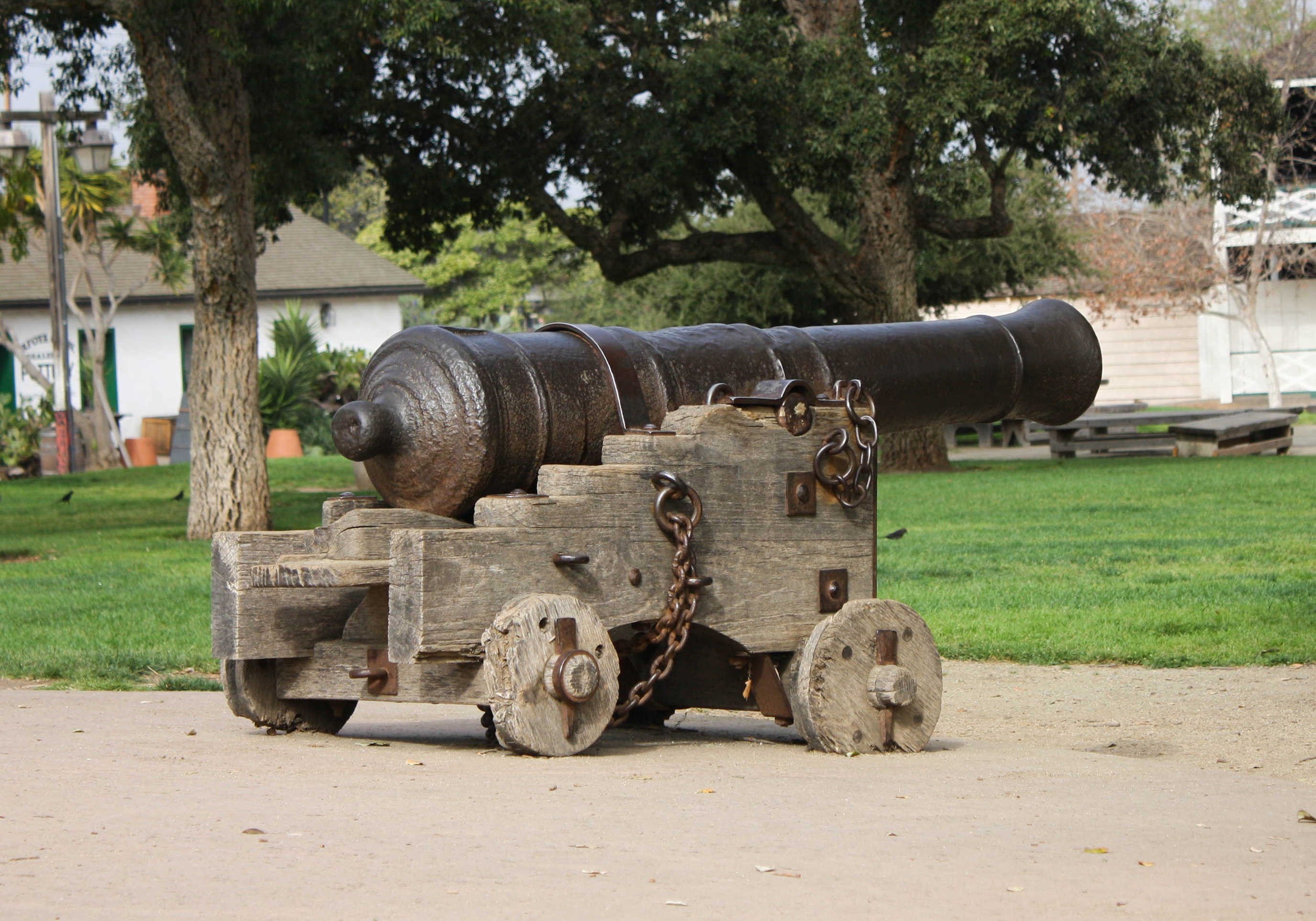
Cannon in Old Town Plaza, called El Capitan, from Fort Guijarros

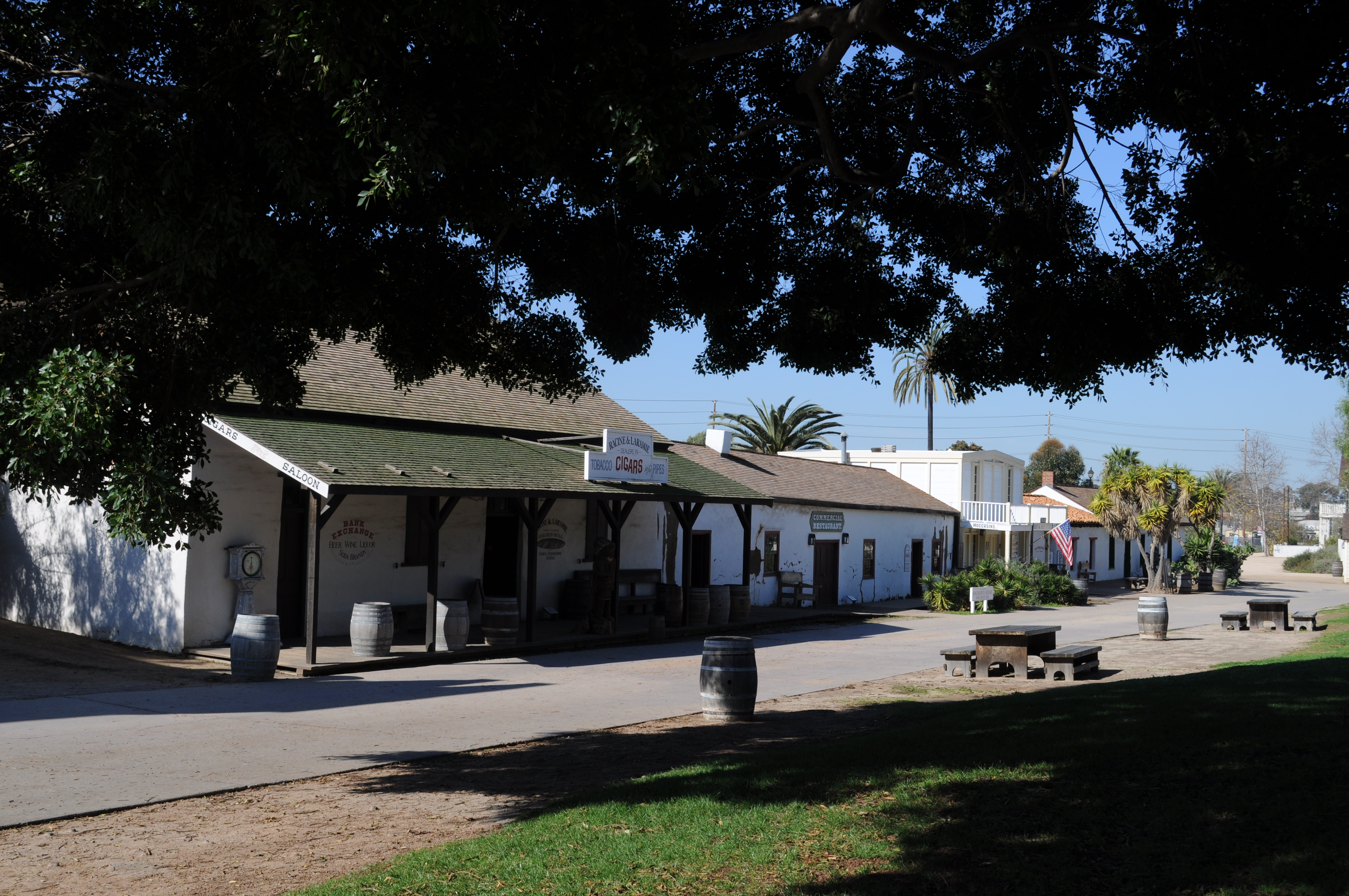
San Diego Viejo Plaza picnic benches and Racine & Laramie cigar store

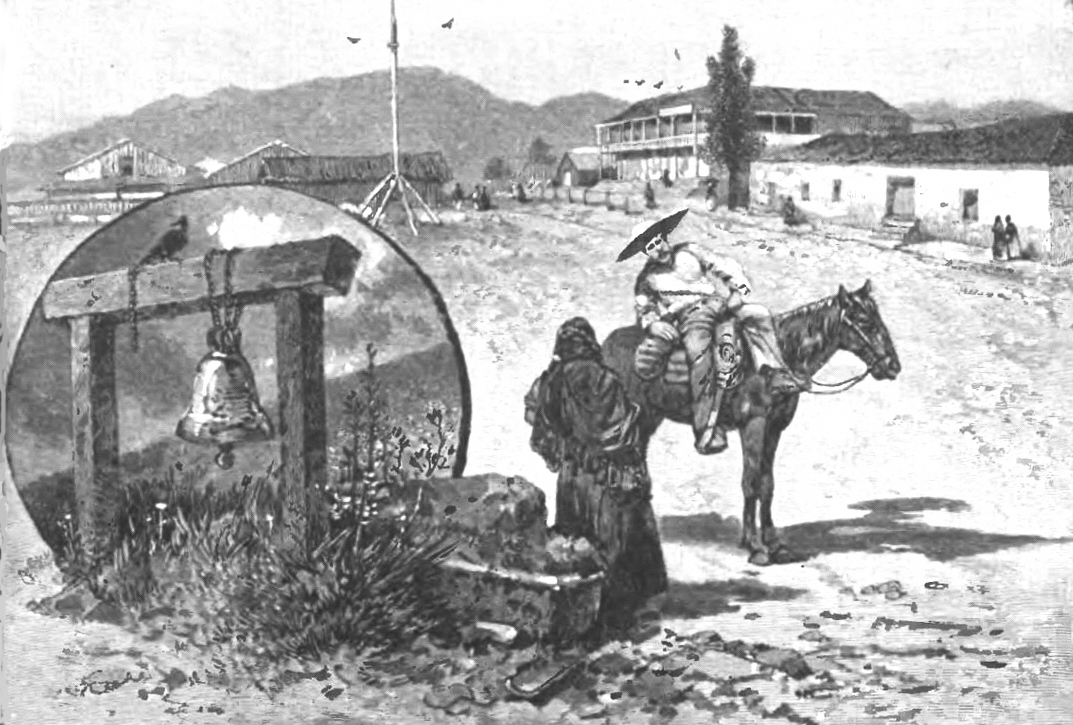
Plaza de Las Armas and the old bell

San Diego Viejo Plaza (San Diego Old Plaza), also called Plaza de Las Armas (Plaza of the Cannon), Old Town Plaza, and Washington Square, is a historical site in San Diego, California. The San Diego Viejo Plaza site is California Historical Landmark No. 63, listed on December 5, 1932. The plaza (town square) was the center of the Pueblo de San Diego, founded in 1835 in Alta California.

== History ==
The major buildings and houses of the Pueblo of San Diego were built around the town square. The Pueblo of San Diego was the first permanent Spanish settlement in California. In 1769, Father Junípero Serra's San Diego mission and Gaspar de Portolá's Presidio of San Diego were built overlooking the Pueblo of San Diego. Ships coming to the Pueblo of San Diego sailed into San Diego Bay. The first houses (casas) at the plaza were built in about 1821. In 1827 over 30 adobe homes had been built around the San Diego central Plaza, many the homes were for retired Spanish Empire veterans. The only large house in the plaza was La Casa de Juan Bandini. From 1770 to 1822, the Pueblo of San Diego was ruled by a commandant from the Presidio of San Diego under the New Spain. In 1822 the First Mexican Empire took control of the government in the Pueblo of San Diego. The Mexican Secularization Act of 1833 opened up mission land for citizens. In 1835 San Diego had a population of 500 and the First Mexican Republic declared San Diego an official pueblo, city status, and could have its own elected mayor (alcalde), not under military rule of the Presidio. Pueblo status was granted after a petition was sent to Governor José Figueroa and endorsed by Commandant Santiago Arguello. In 1838 San Diego lost its pueblo status because of the declining population. The United States acquired Alta California and San Diego through the Mexican–American War and the Treaty of Guadalupe Hidalgo. On July 29, 1846, at 4 p.m. the first flag of the United States was raised in Plaza San Diego Viejo by Lt. Stephen C. Rowan, a United States Navy commander of US sailors and US marines. Stephen C. Rowan arrived at US sloop-of-war USS Cyan built in 1837. After the war, the United States renamed the plaza, Washington Square.

Pueblo of San Diego Plaza was an inland town as such in 1850, a new building started at San Diego Bay, The US Army built New San Diego Barracks in 1850 and 1851, a supply depot and wharf. The depot was built in what was called at the time New San Diego, on San Diego Bay, south of the Pueblo de San Diego. New San Diego was built into a town by William Heath Davis in the early 1850s.

By 1890 many of the houses and buildings became run down. The plaza had been neglected and many of the original homes and buildings were demolished. In the 1920s and 1930s preservation works started to save the remaining buildings and homes. The Works Progress Administration did restoration in the 1930s of a few remaining buildings, including the Casa de Estudillo. The State of California designated Old Town San Diego as a California State Historic Park in 1968 and more preservation and reconstruction work was done. With the new California Historic designation, the title San Diego Viejo Plaza and Plaza de Las Armas came back in use.

Early mayors, called alcalde, of the Pueblo de San Diego, included: Juan María Osuna, Santiago Argüello, José Antonio Estudillo, Rosario E. Aguilar, Jesús Moreno, and José María Alvarado. The city of San Diego Incorporated on March 27, 1850. The State of California was admitted to the Union on September 9, 1850.

Plaza de Las Armas is boarded by Calhoun Street on the northeast, Mason Street on the southeast, San Diego Avenue on the southwest, and Wallace Street on the northwest.

A historical marker, on a large rock, is at Old Town Plaza, Washington Square, in Old Town San Diego State Historic Park.

== Plaza de Las Armas landmarks ==
There are over 26 designated historical sites around the plaza.
Close to the San Diego Viejo Plaza marker are other historical markers and buildings:

Buildings:

- Robinson-Rose House 1853 by James W. Robinson, now visitor center
- Johnson House, Old Town San Diego
- Casa de Estudillo House
- Casa de Machado y Silvas
- Casa de Stewart
- Casa de Pedrorena de Altamirano building
- Mason Street School building
- Alvarado House 1830 home of Francisco Maria Alvarado
- Thomas Wrightington House
- Colorado House, reconstructed 1850s hotel building
- Seeley Stables Museum, a reconstructed 1850s stable Museum
- Blackhawk Smithy & Stable which features blacksmith demonstrations
- Cosmopolitan Hotel and Restaurant
- First San Diego Courthouse, a reconstructed 1850s courthouse
- Old Town San Diego marker
- La Casa de Rodriguez, Racine and Laramie a reconstructed 1850s period tobacconist
- San Diego Union Museum, a 1850s period newspaper office and print shop
- US House built in 1850 as general store run by Charles Noell and John Hayes.
- McCoy House Museum built in 1869.
- Cannon in Old Town Plaza, called El Capitan
- Plaza San Diego Viejo flagpole a reconstruction of the 1846 tall flagpole.
- Adobe Chapel of The Immaculate Conception 1850 John Brown House, two block south of plaza

Markers:

- The end of the Kearney Trail historical marker.
- La Casa de Estudillo marker
- La Casa de Rodriguez marker
- Juan Bandini Marker
- Birthplace of the San Diego Union
- Original Foundation Casa de Aguirre
- Father Antonio Ubach marker
- 1906 Old Town Convent
- Don Antonio Aguirre marker
- Adobe Construction marker

== Gallery ==
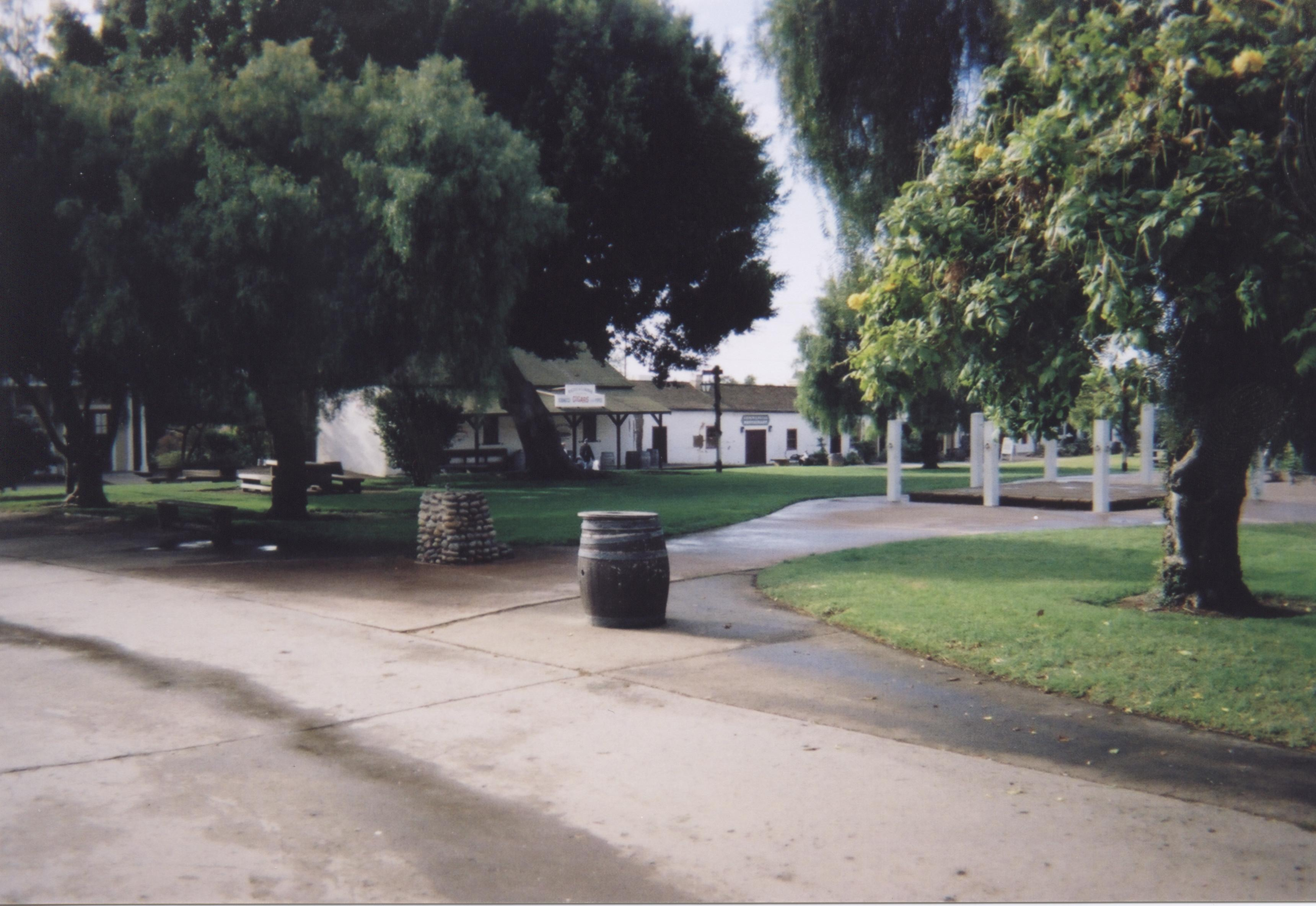
Plaza de Las Armas

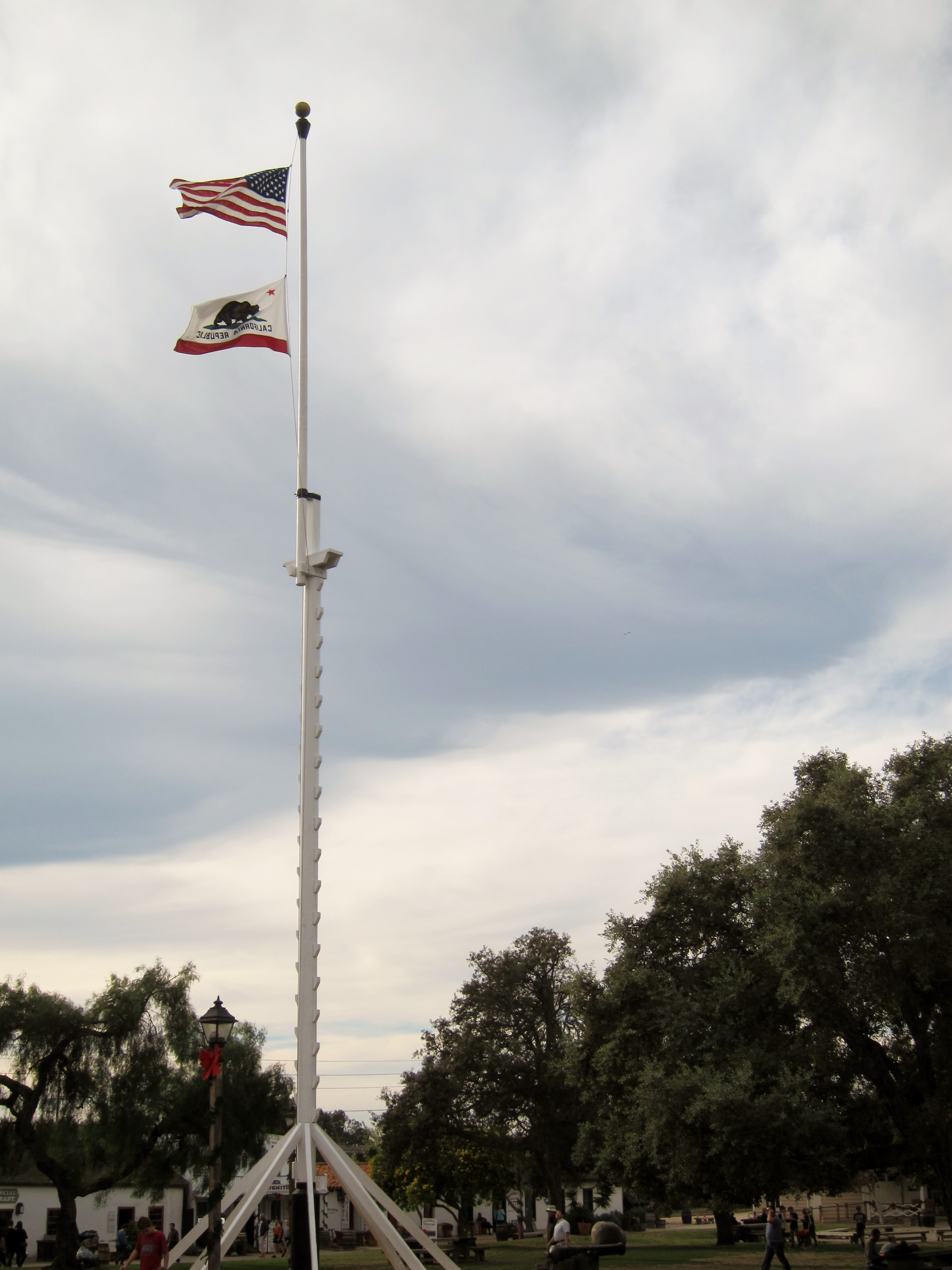
Plaza de Las Armas flagpole

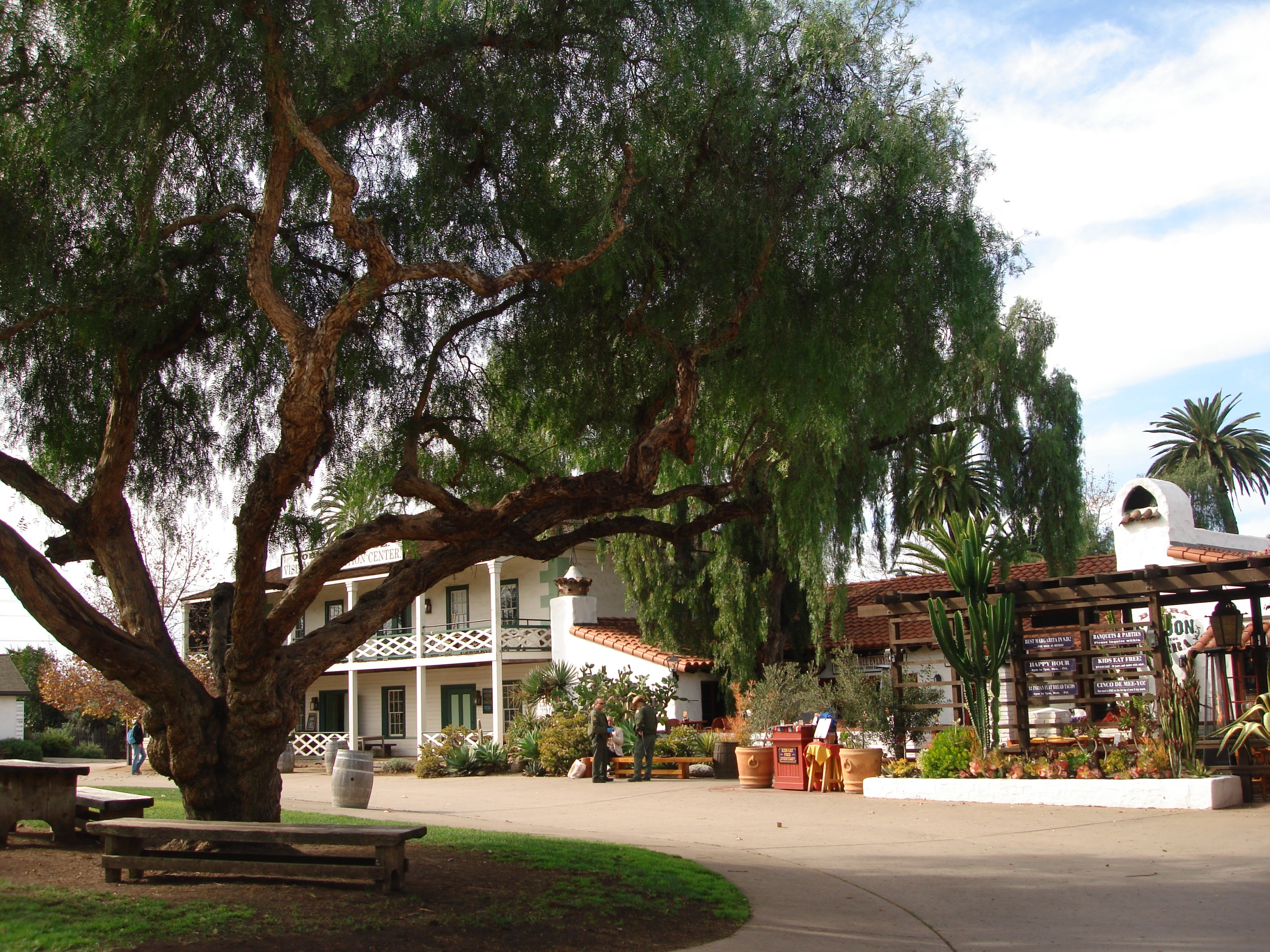
Plaza de Las Armas and Robinson-Rose House

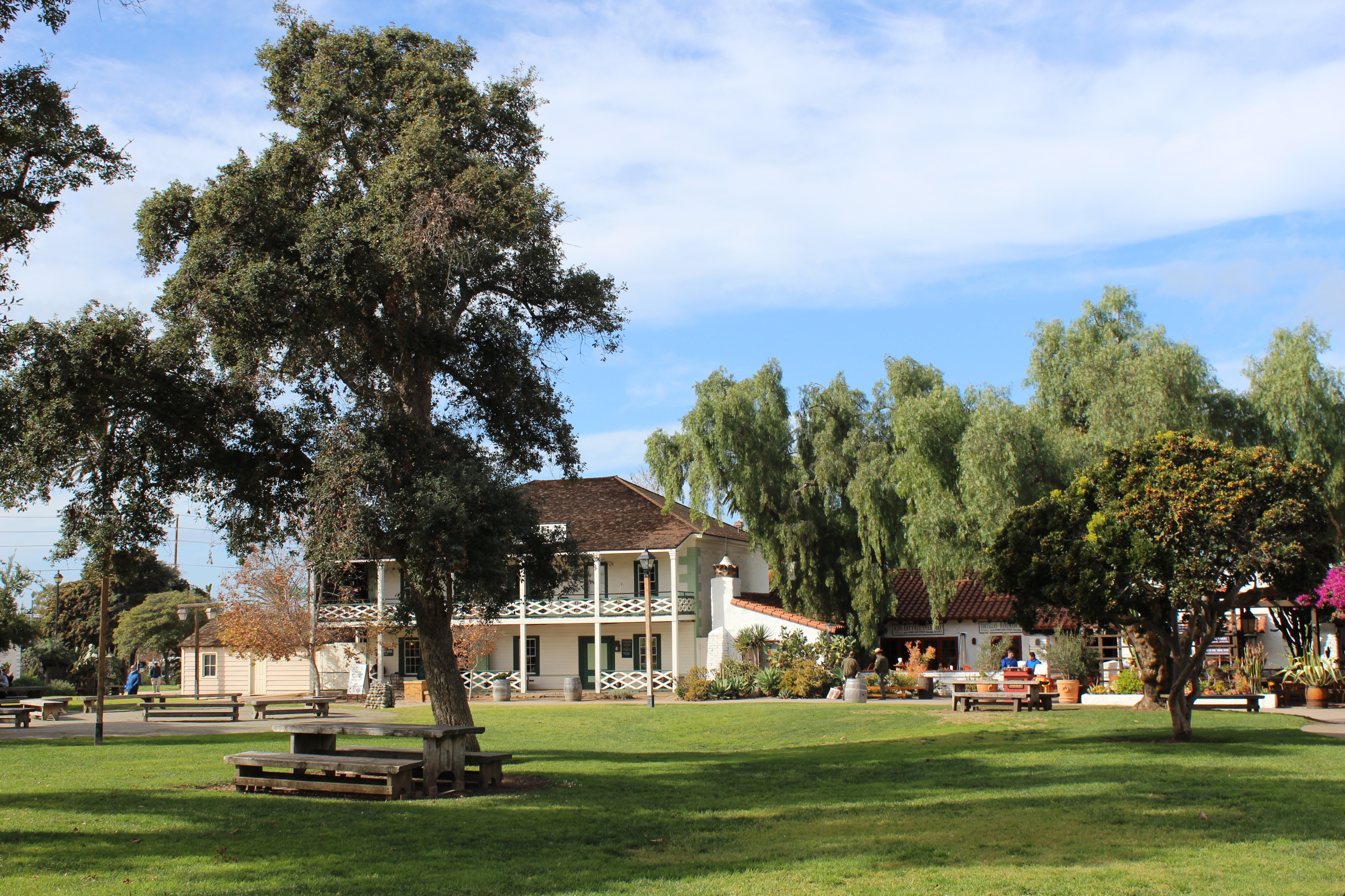
Plaza de Las Armas

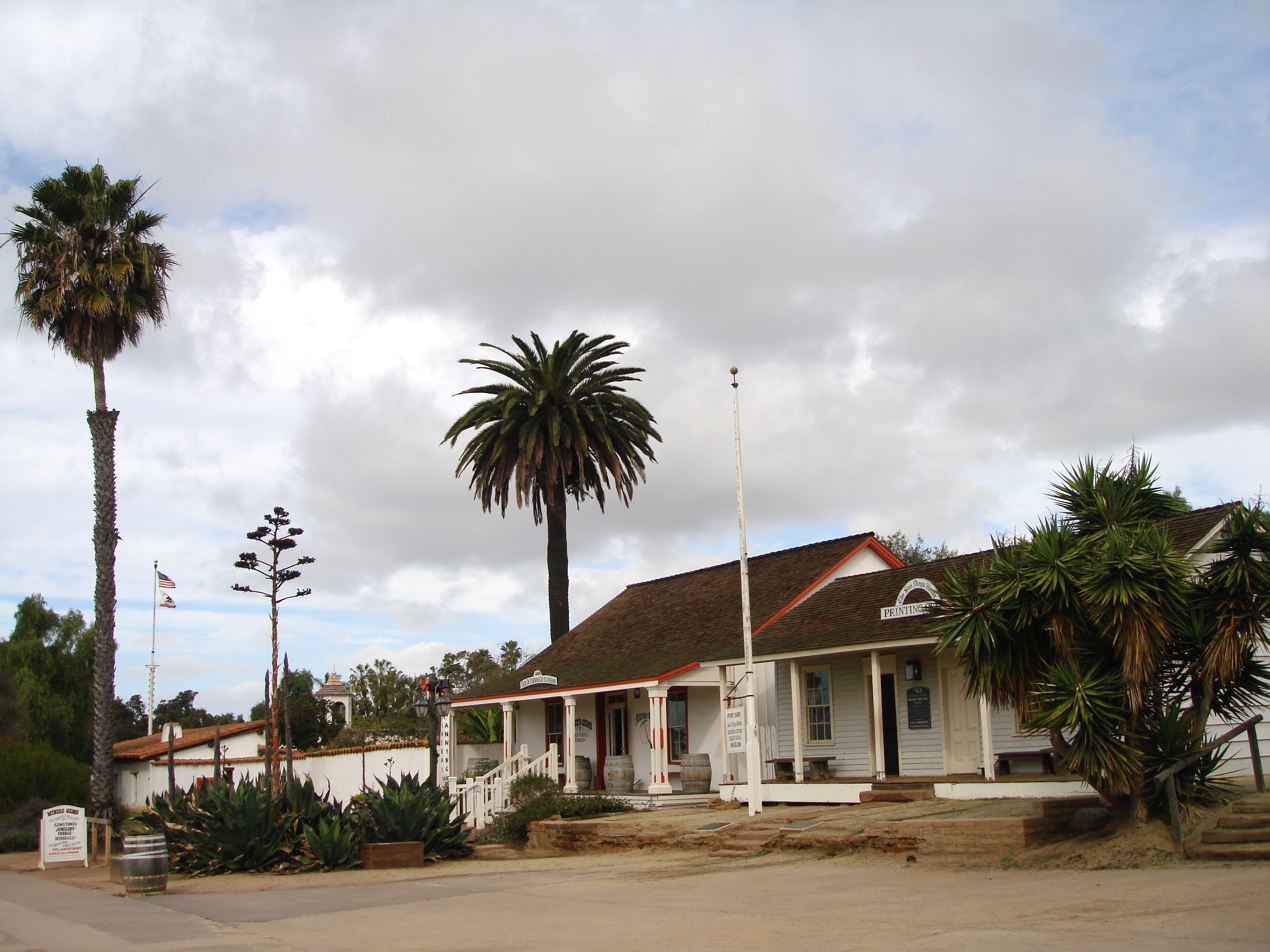
Plaza de Las Armas and Casa de Pedrorena de Altamirano

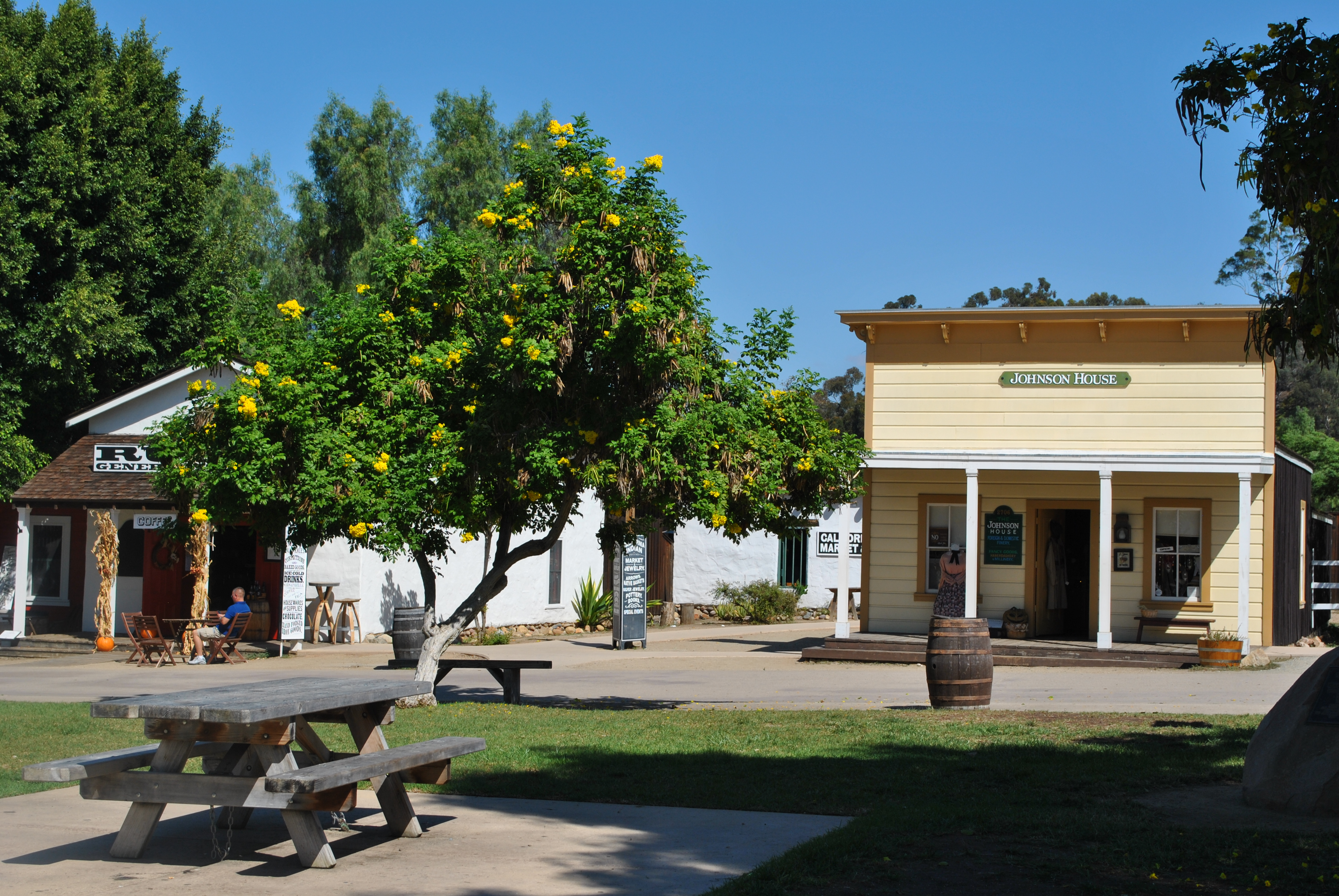
Plaza de Las Armas, Johnson House and Cosmopolitan Hotel

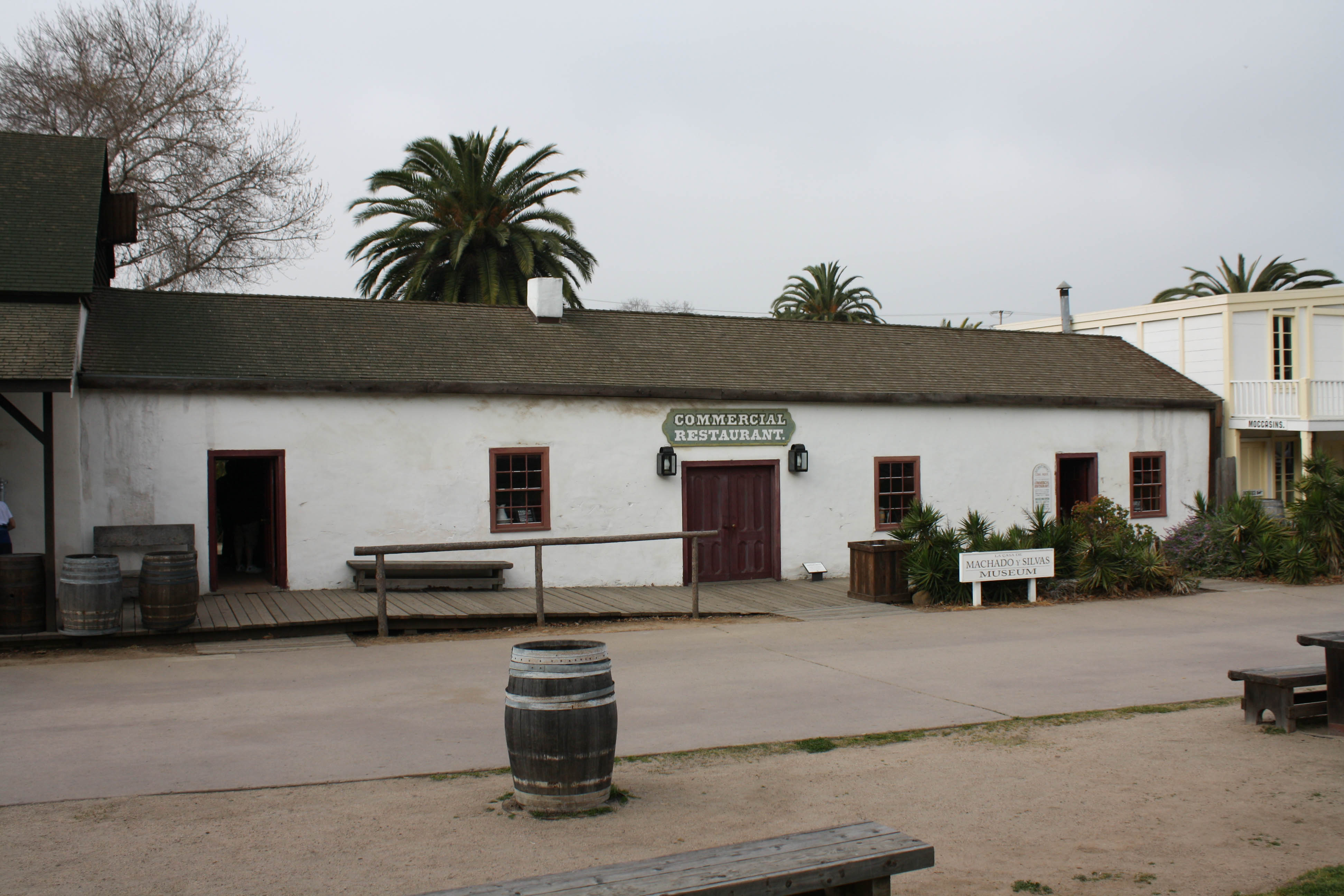
Plaza de Las Armas and Casa de Machado y Silvas

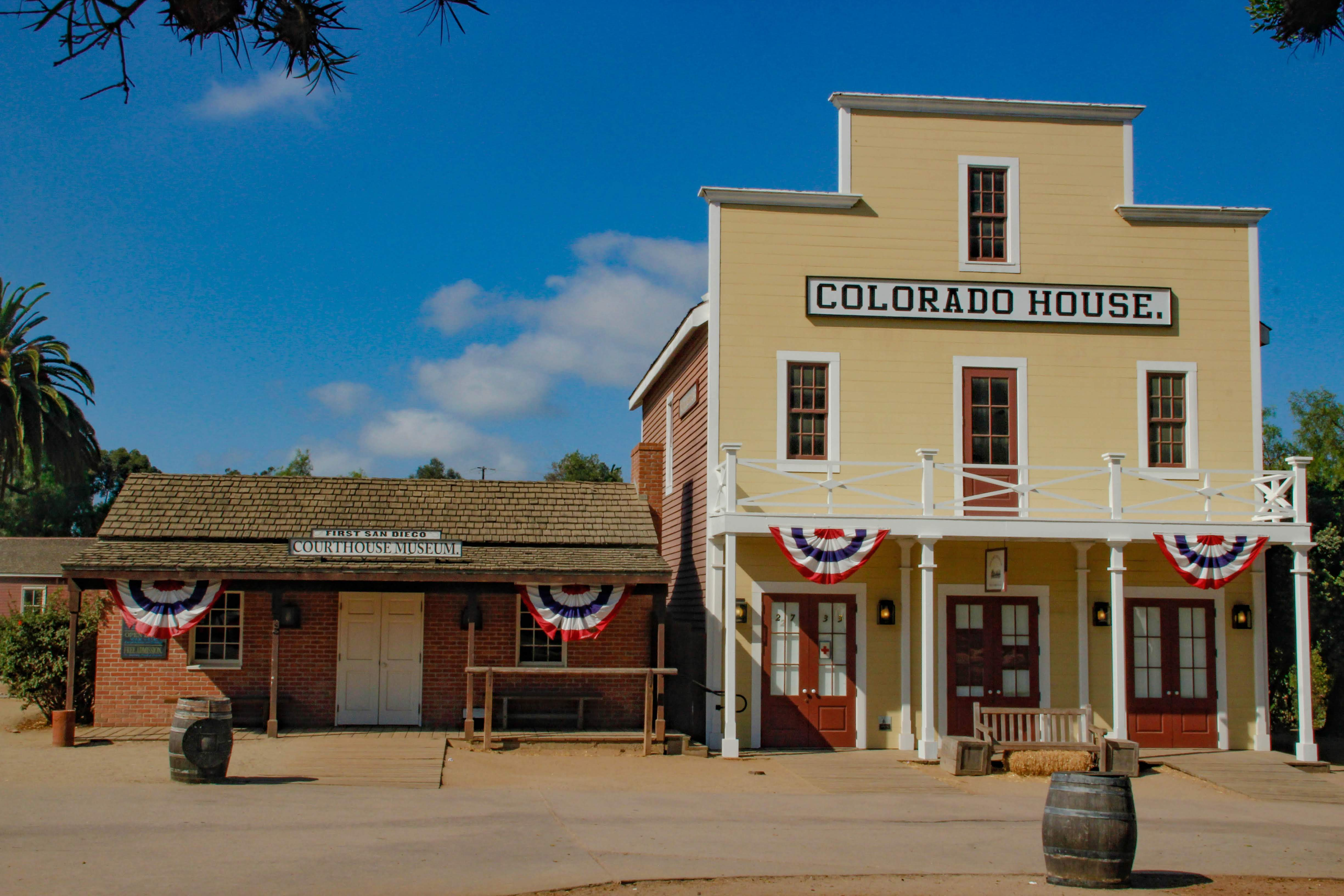
Plaza de Las Armas, Colorado House and courthouse built by Cave Johnson Couts

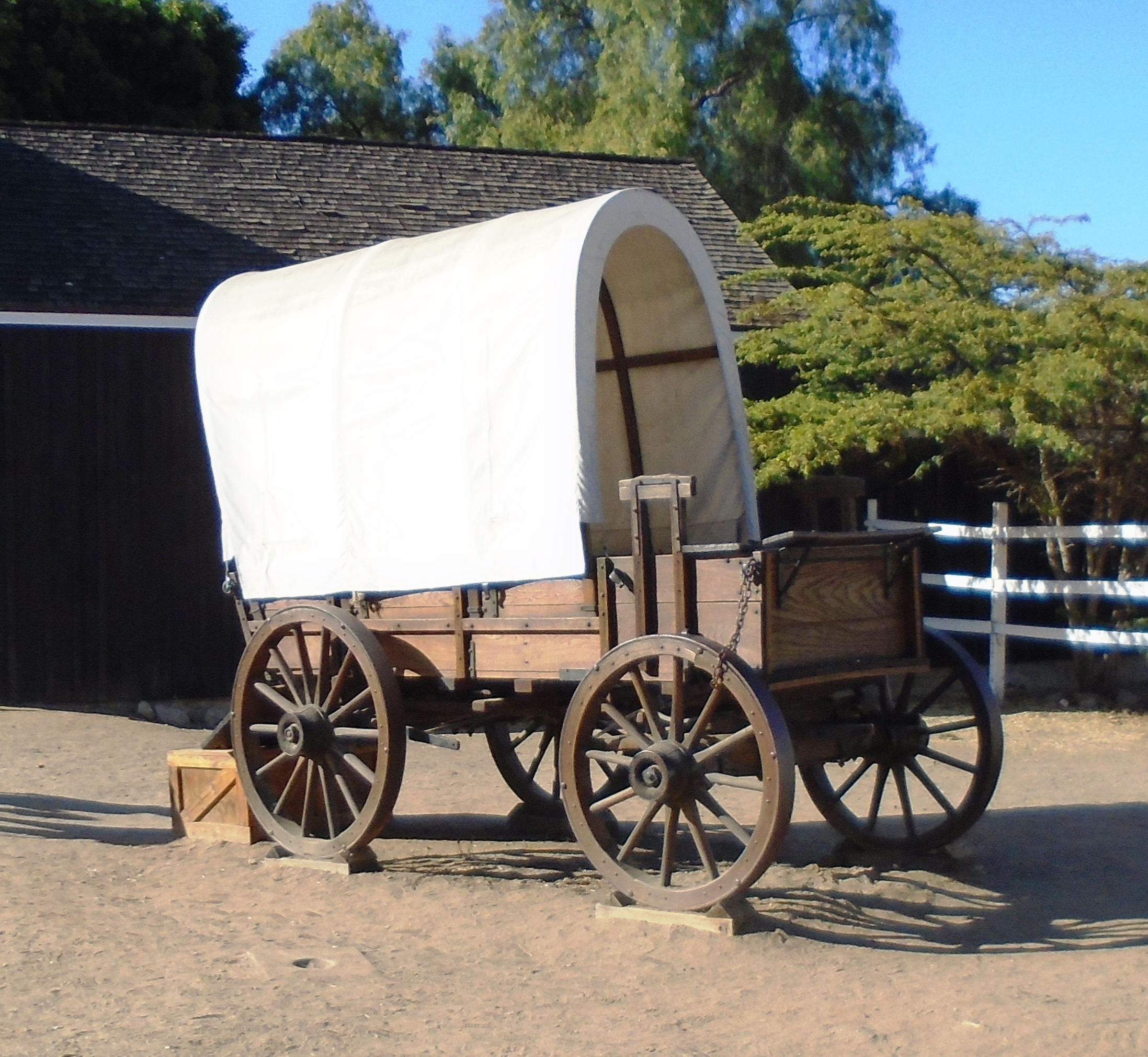
Plaza de Las Armas Old Town wagon

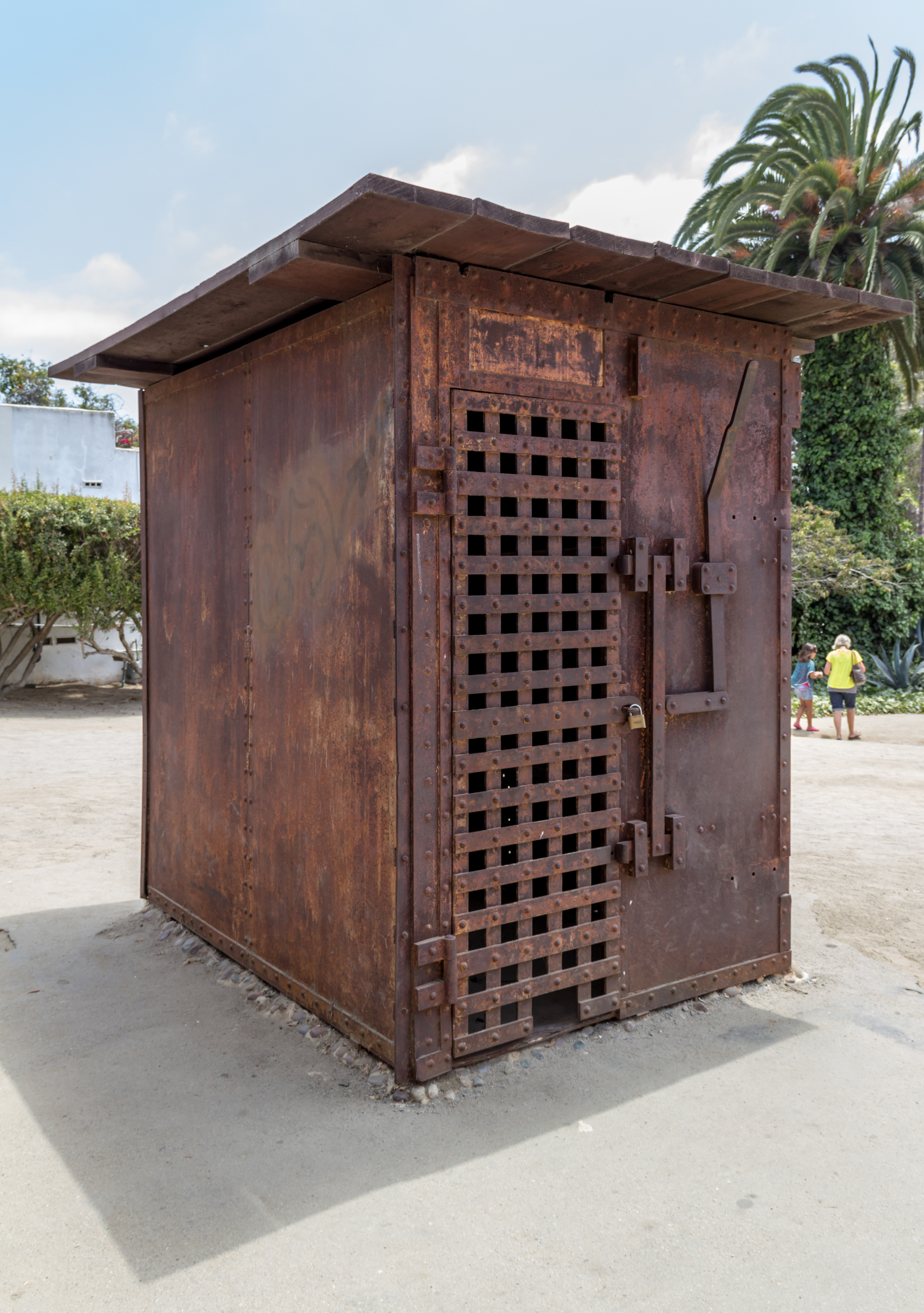
Plaza de Las Armas Old Town jail

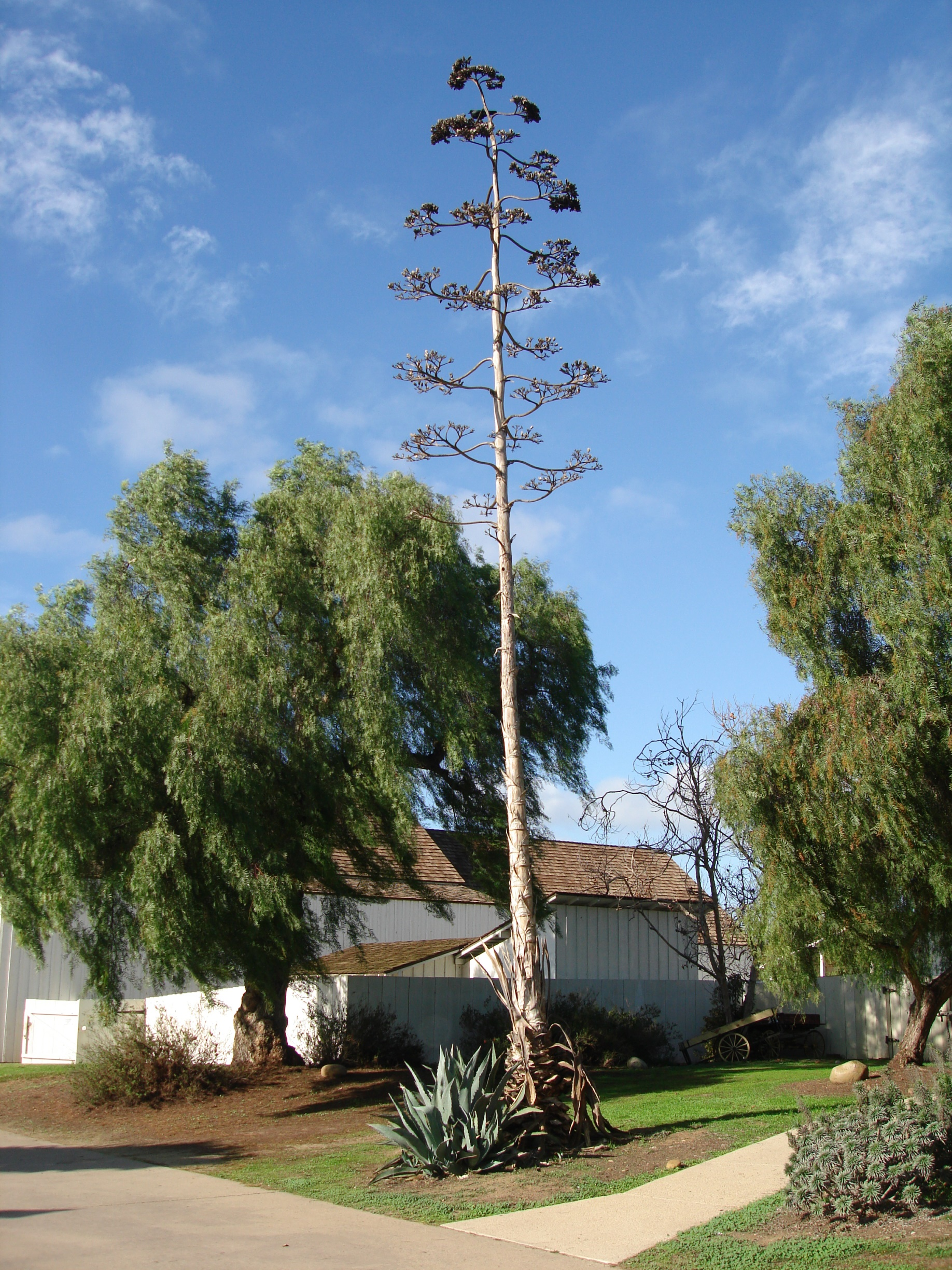
Plaza de Las Armas

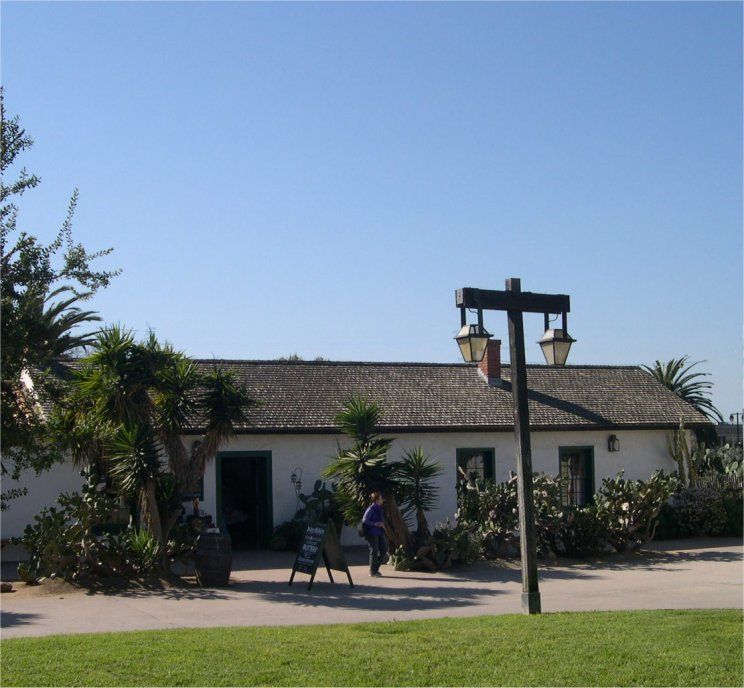
Thomas Wrightington House

== See also ==
- California Historical Landmarks in San Diego County
- List of pre-statehood mayors of San Diego
- Junípero Serra Museum
- El Desembarcadero
- Congress Hall
- History of San Diego
- Mission San Diego de Alcalá
- Presidio of San Diego
- Casa de Cota
- Derby Dike
- Casa de Lopez marker
- Manuel Victoria
- Pío Pico
- José Figueroa
- Baja California Territory
- San Diego Barracks US Army depot
