= Rancho Ex-Mission San Diego =

Mexican land grant in California

Coordinates: 32.810°N 117.080°W

Rancho Ex-Mission San Diego was a 58,875-acre (238.26 km^{2}) Mexican land grant in present-day San Diego County, California, given in 1846 by Governor Pio Pico to Santiago Argüello. The rancho derives its name from the secularized Mission San Diego, and was called ex-Mission because of a division made of the lands held in the name of the Mission—the church retaining the grounds immediately around, and all of the lands outside of this are called ex-Mission lands. The grant extended eastward from the Pueblo San Diego to Rancho El Cajon, and encompassed present day east San Diego, Normal Heights, La Mesa, Lemon Grove, and Encanto.

== History ==
Pío Pico decreed that the mission rancho be sold to Santiago Argüello "in consideration of past services to the territorial government." According to the terms of the 1846 deed, Argüello was required to pay the debts of the Mission, support the priests, and maintain religious services. Santiago Argüello (1791–1862), born at Monterey, was the son of José Darío Argüello. He held a number of political and military offices at San Diego and was commandante of the Presidio of San Diego from 1830 to 1835. In 1829 he was granted the Tia Juana Rancho, in Mexico. He aided the American cause during the Mexican–American War, was captain of a troop of the California battalion, and died at the Tia Juana Rancho in 1862.

With the cession of California to the United States following the Mexican–American War, the 1848 Treaty of Guadalupe Hidalgo provided that the land grants would be honored. As required by the Land Act of 1851, a claim for Rancho Ex-Mission San Diego was filed with the Public Land Commission in 1852, and the grant was patented to Santiago Argüello in 1876.

== See also ==
- Ranchos of California
- List of Ranchos of California
