= Old Town San Diego State Historic Park =

- Old Town San Diego Historic District
- U.S. National Register of Historic Places
- U.S. Historic district
- California Historical Landmark
- San Diego Historic Landmark
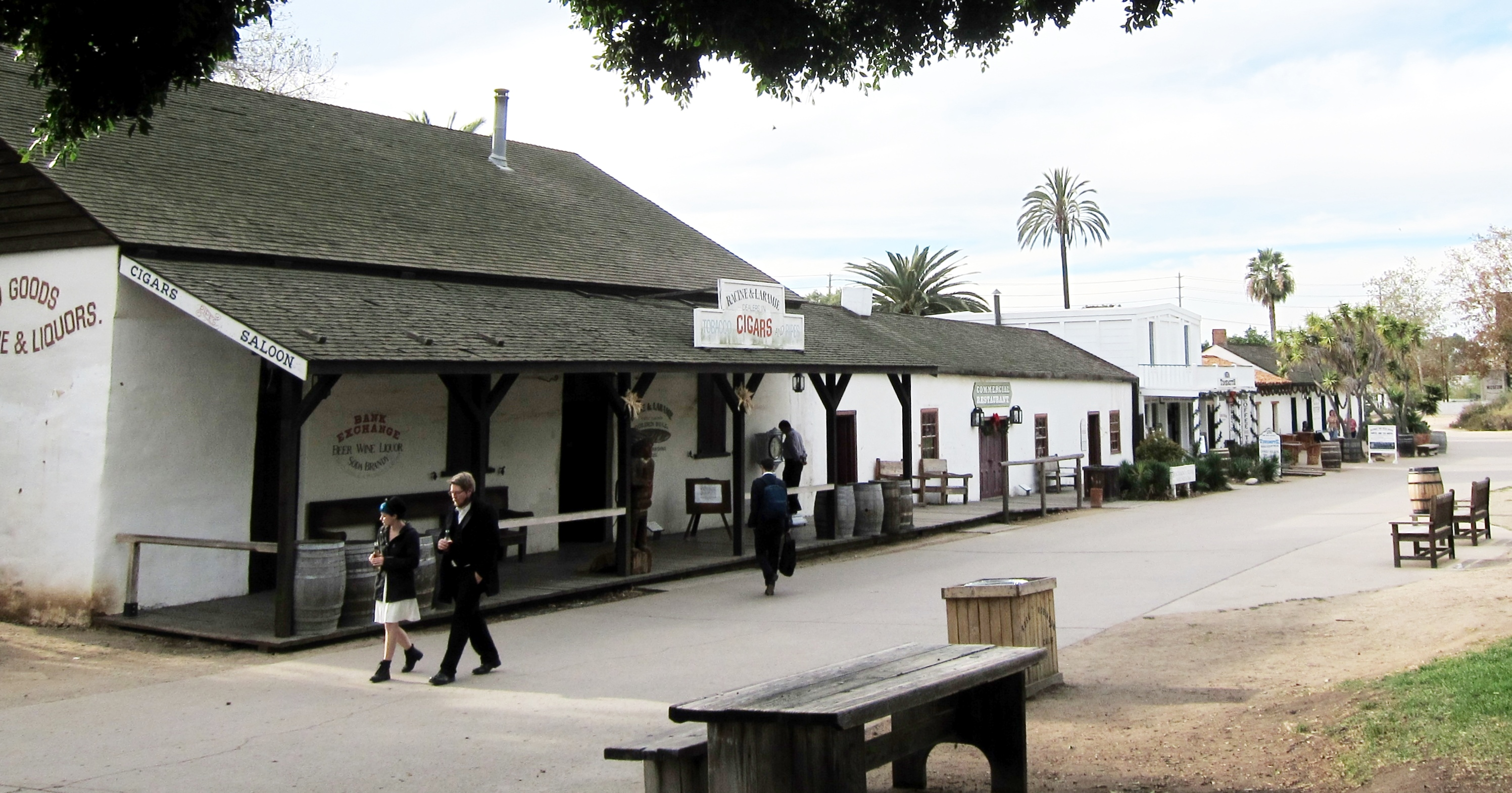
- (2015)

- Location within San Diego Location within California
- Location: San Diego, California
- Coordinates: 32°45′16.77″N 117°11′50.42″W
- Area: 29.08 acres (117,700 m^{2})
- Built: 1825
- Architectural style: Colonial
- NRHP reference No.: 71000182
- CHISL No.: 830
- SDHL No.: 14

Significant dates
- Added to NRHP: September 3, 1971
- Designated SDHL: November 6, 1970

Old Town San Diego State Historic Park is a state protected historical park in the Old Town neighborhood of San Diego, California. The park commemorates the early days of San Diego; it includes many historic buildings from the period 1820 to 1870. The park was established in 1968. In 2005 and 2006, California State Parks listed Old Town San Diego as the most visited state park in California.

In 1969, the site was registered as California Historical Landmark No. 830. Then on September 3, 1971, it was added to the National Register of Historic Places as Old Town San Diego Historic District.

== History ==
The first European settlement on the West Coast of the present-day United States was the San Diego Presidio, a military outpost of Spanish California, founded by Gaspar de Portolà in 1769. Mission San Diego de Alcalá was founded by Father Junípero Serra the same year. The Presidio and Mission were originally built on a bluff above the San Diego River, Presidio Hill, which is now the site of the city-owned Presidio Park and which is immediately adjacent to Old Town State Historic Park.

After five years the Mission moved to a location several miles upriver at the present site of Mission San Diego de Alcalá. Presidio Hill remained the primary settlement for several decades because it was defensible against attack by European enemies or hostile Native Americans. As the need for defense decreased, settlers preferred to live at the base of the hill because of greater convenience. In the 1820s the town of San Diego grew up at the base of the bluff, at the site commemorated by Old Town San Diego State Historic Park. The Presidio was abandoned and fell into disrepair.

During the pueblo period following Mexican independence, the Old Town area was the commercial and governmental hub of the region, even though its population was never more than a few hundred. San Diego during this period is vividly described by Richard Henry Dana Jr. in his classic book Two Years Before the Mast. In 1834 the Mexican government granted San Diego the status of a pueblo or chartered town; however, its pueblo status was revoked in 1838 due to declining population. One problem limiting the town's growth was its location far from navigable water. All imports and exports had to be brought ashore in Point Loma and carried several miles over La Playa Trail to the town.

When California was admitted to the United States in 1850, San Diego (still largely limited to the Old Town area) was made the county seat of San Diego County, even though the town's population was only 650.

The Old Town area remained the heart of the city of San Diego until the 1860s, when a newcomer to San Diego named Alonzo Horton began to promote development at the site of present-day downtown San Diego. Residents and businesses quickly abandoned "Old Town" for Horton's "New Town" because of New Town's proximity to shipping. In 1871 government records were moved from Old Town to a new county courthouse in New Town, and Downtown permanently eclipsed Old Town as the focal point of San Diego.

Old Town San Diego State Historic Park preserves and recreates Old Town as it existed during the Mexican and early American periods, from its settlement in 1821, through 1872 when it lost its dominant position to Downtown.

The Old Town area is a popular tourist destination, known especially for its Mexican restaurants. The state park itself hosts several eating establishments, and other restaurants and gift shops are found in the surrounding neighborhood.

Old Town is known for its historic structures and history such as the Whaley House. The Whaley House is known for being the most haunted house in America. It is important to preserve Old Town's history because it is the birthplace of California. It shows the pre and post colonial eras of San Diego.

== Attractions ==
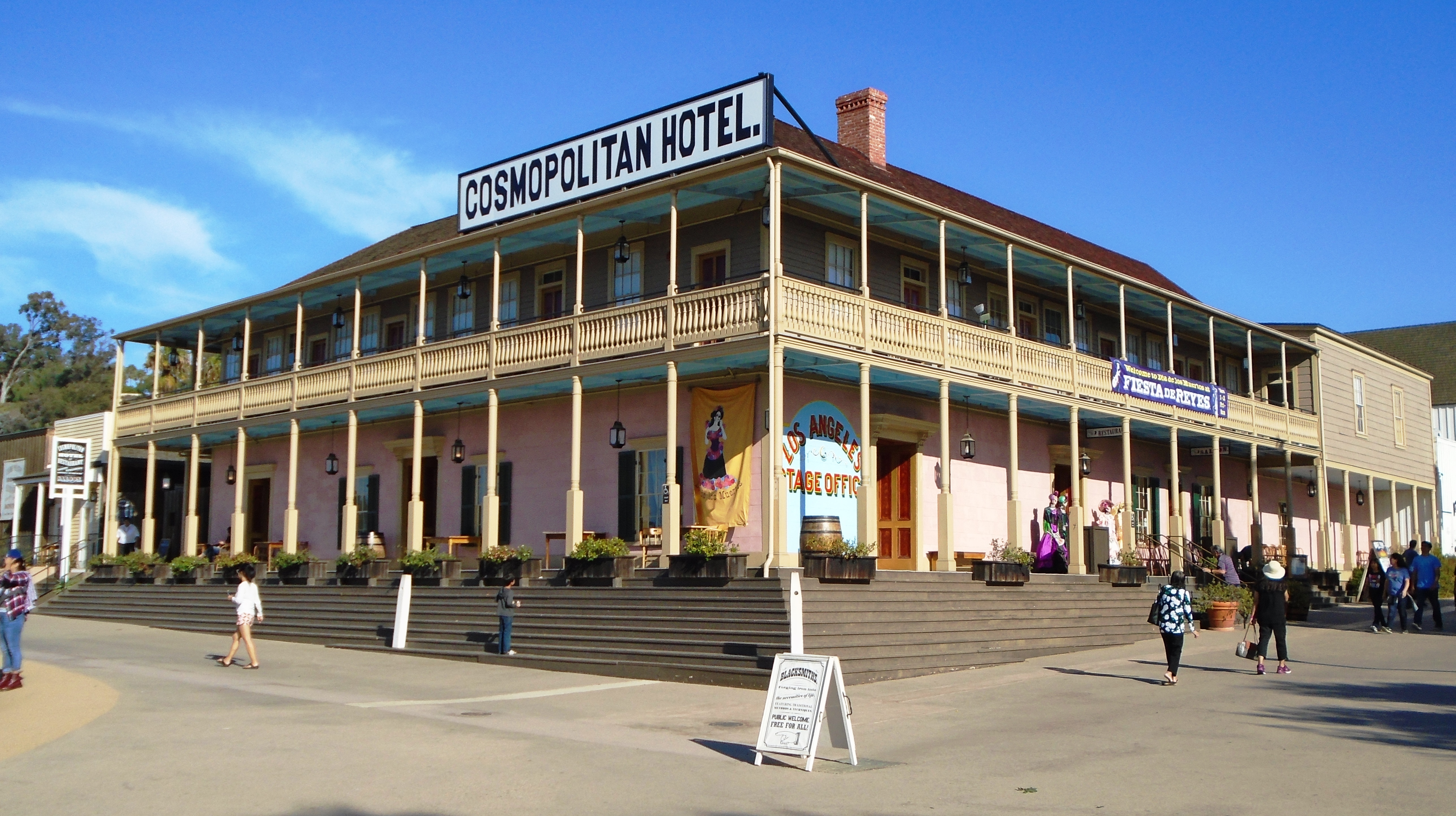
The Cosmopolitan Hotel

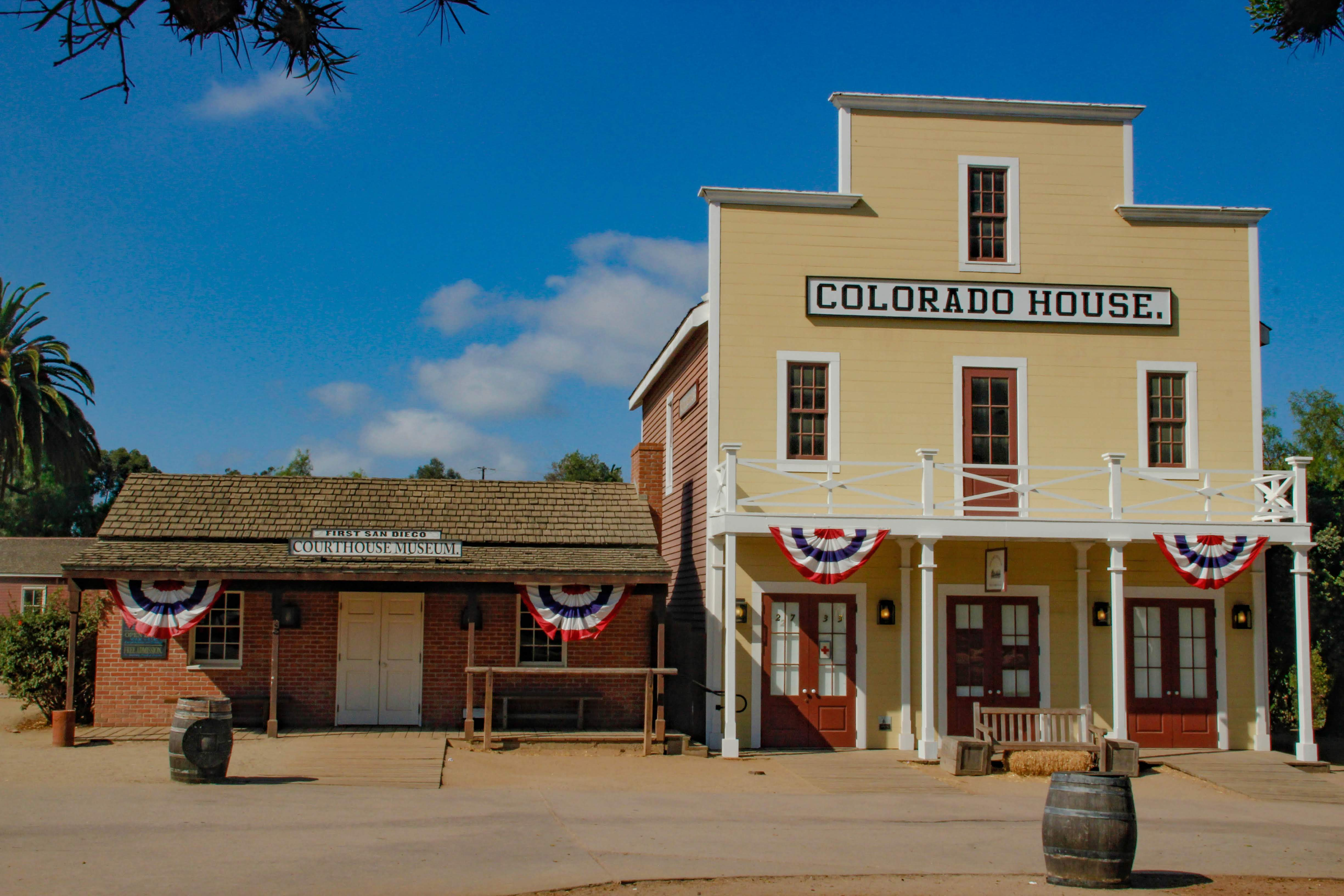
The First San Diego Courthouse, now the Courthouse Museum, (left) and Colorado House (built by Cave Johnson Couts), location of the Wells Fargo History Museum (right)

Five original adobe buildings are part of the complex, which includes shops, restaurants and museums. Other historic buildings include a schoolhouse, a blacksmith shop, San Diego's first newspaper office, a cigar and pipe store, houses and gardens, and a stable with a carriage collection. There are also stores, with local artisans demonstrating their craft. The shops located in this area are festive and distinctive capturing the cultural history of San Diego. They have boutiques, antique stores, retro shops, outlet centers, and local independently owned shops. They also have diverse shops that highlight upcoming artists' work and their culture. There is no charge to enter the state park or any of its museums.

The museums include:

- Plaza San Diego Viejo, also called Plaza de Las Armas and Washington Square
- Casa de Estudillo, 1827 adobe house, a National Historic Landmark in its own right
- Casa de Machado y Silvas, 1840s adobe
- Casa de Machado y Stewart, a restored 19th century adobe
- Blackhawk Smithy & Stable, which features blacksmith demonstrations
- Colorado House, reconstructed 1850s hotel building built by Cave Johnson Couts, that serves as the Wells Fargo History Museum (now closed), featuring a reconstructed 19th-century stage stop and telegraph office
- First San Diego Courthouse, a reconstructed mid-19th century courthouse
- Johnson House, a reconstructed mid-19th century office building later the house of George Alonzo Johnson.
- Mason Street School, the first public school house in San Diego
- Racine and Laramie ("La Casa de Rodriguez"), a reconstructed mid-19th century period tobacconist
- San Diego Union Museum, a mid-19th century period newspaper office and print shop
- Seeley Stables, a reconstructed mid-19th century stable and barns that feature horse-drawn buggies, wagons, carriages and western memorabilia
- Cosmopolitan Hotel and Restaurant ("La Casa de Bandini"), an 1870 restored hotel, still working as a hotel and restaurant.
- Living history demonstrations and free tours are regularly scheduled. Historical interpretation is primarily carried out by park employees and volunteers, and the Mexican Commercial Corner is host to several locally based small businesses and artists.

=== Commercial concessions ===
The commercial facilities in Old Town State Park, such as restaurants and gift shops, are managed by outside contractors. For more than 30 years the largest single contractor was Bazaar del Mundo ("Bazaar of the World"), run by San Diego businesswoman Diane Powers. In a controversial move, in 2005 the state park agency did not renew her contract but awarded it to Plaza del Pasado ("Plaza of the Past"), run by Delaware North Companies. The goal was to create a more authentic and historically accurate presentation and appreciation of life and commerce in San Diego from 1821 to 1872. However revenue plunged under the new management. In spring 2009, Delaware North withdrew from its contract with the state and management changed hands to the Old Town Family Hospitality Corporation, headed by local restaurateur Chuck Ross. The commercial area is now called Fiesta de Reyes ("Festival of the Kings") featuring local goods, foods, and souvenirs that reference San Diego's culture and history.

=== Adjacent attractions ===
- Adjacent to the state park is Heritage County Park, run by San Diego County. It houses seven buildings from the 1880s and 1890s which have been moved there from elsewhere in the city.
- Also nearby is the Mormon Battalion Historic Site. The city-owned Presidio Park, site of the original Presidio of San Diego, is on the adjacent hill.
- The San Diego Sheriff's Museum and Educational Center is located in Old Town. It includes police equipment, uniforms, patrol car, helicopter, motorcycle, a jail cell and courtroom.
- The Whaley House museum is also nearby.

== Gallery ==
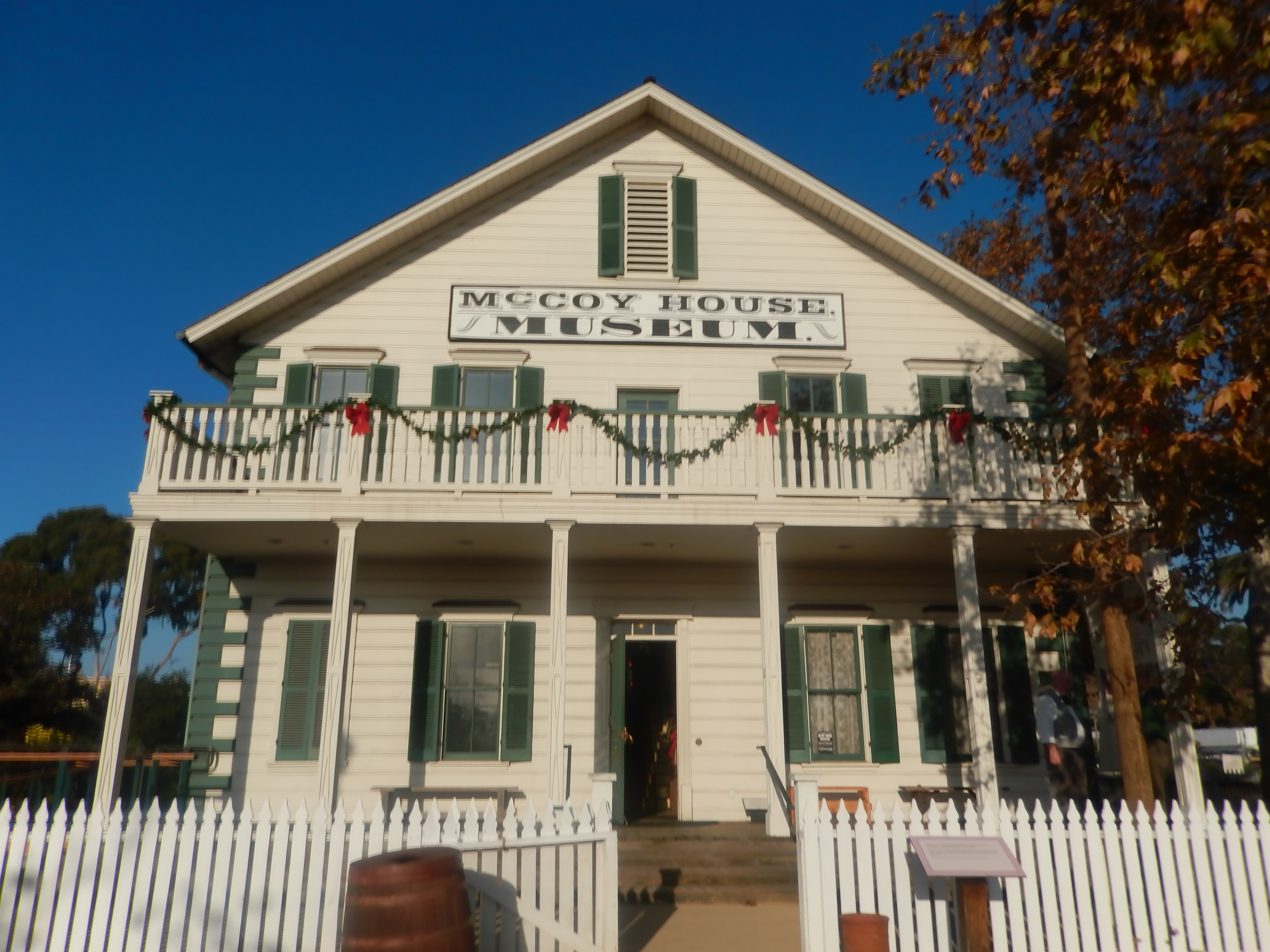
McCoy House Museum

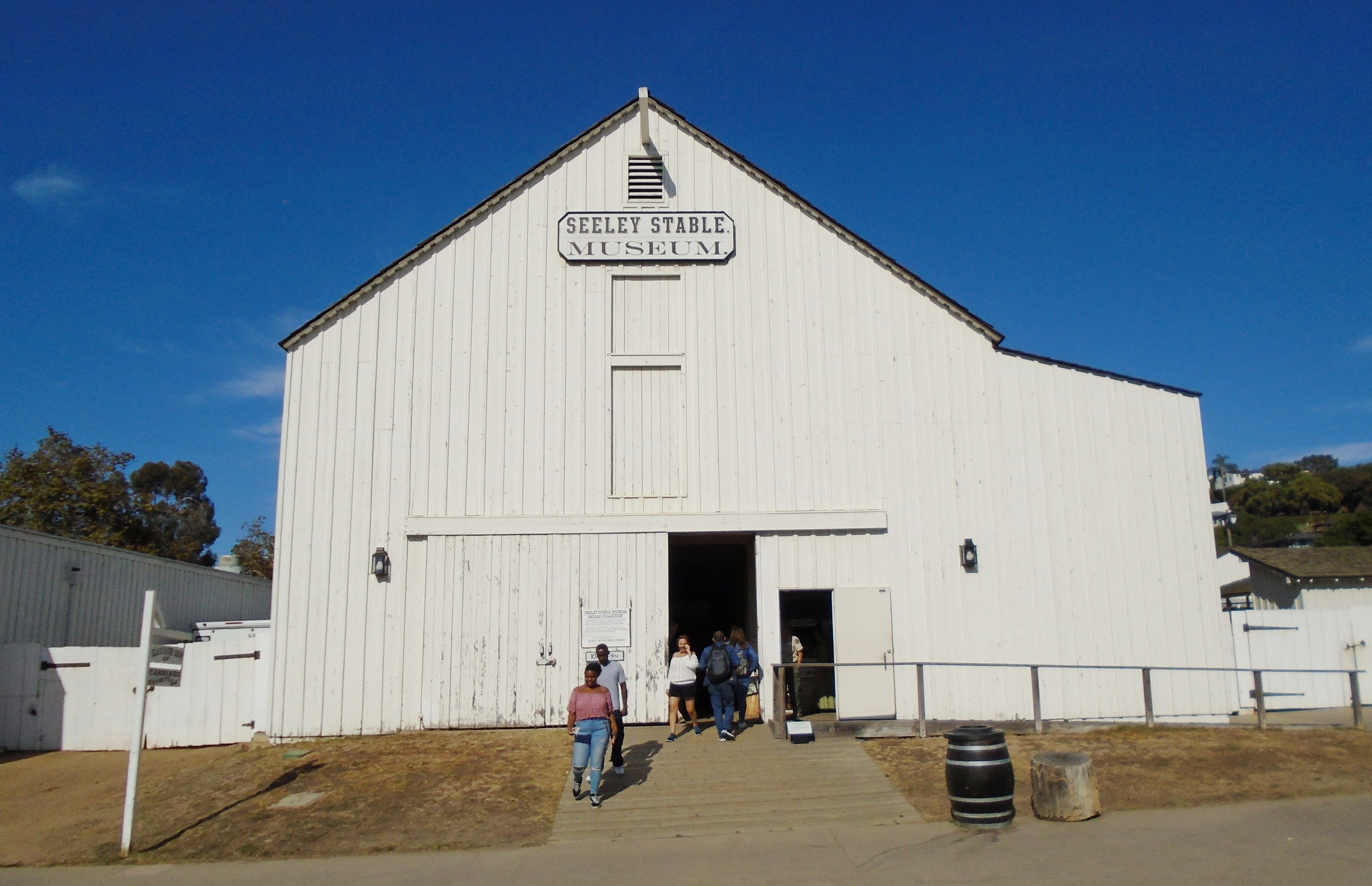
Seeley Stable Museum

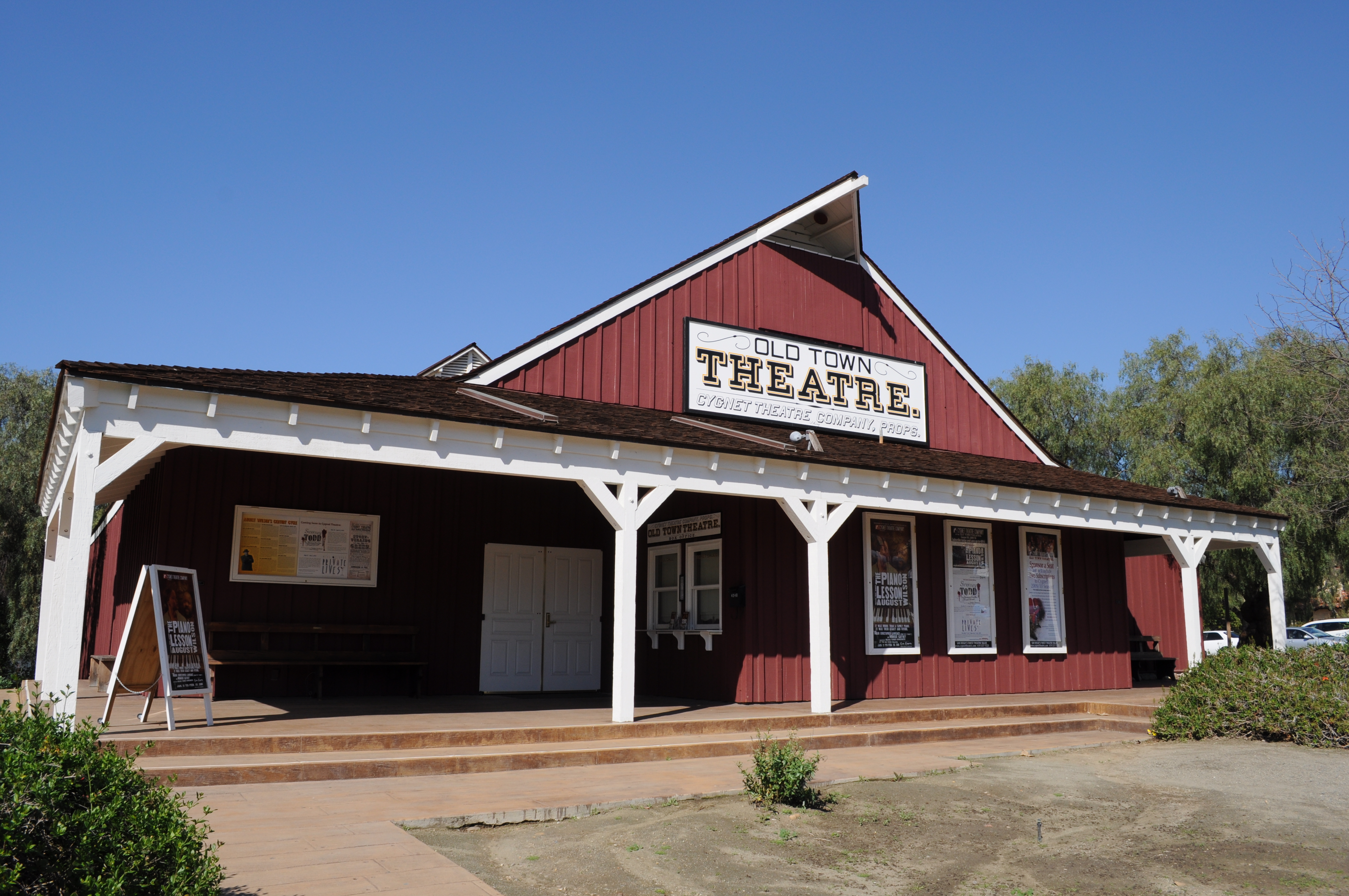
Old Town Theater, occupied by Cygnet Theatre as of 2024

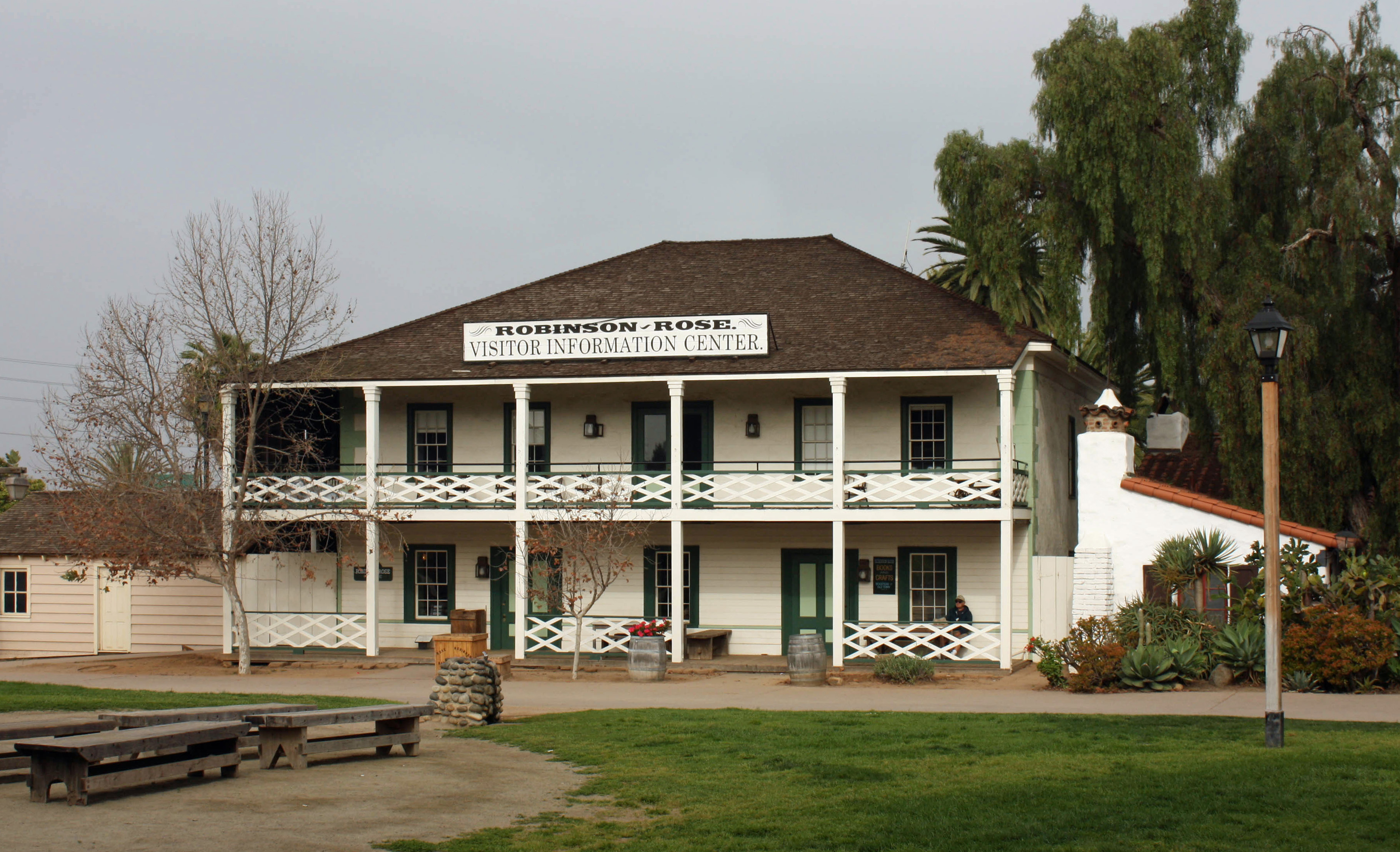
The Robinson-Rose House, now the Visitor Center

== See also ==
- Old Town San Diego
- History of San Diego
