= Santiago Argüello =

Californio soldier (1791–1862)

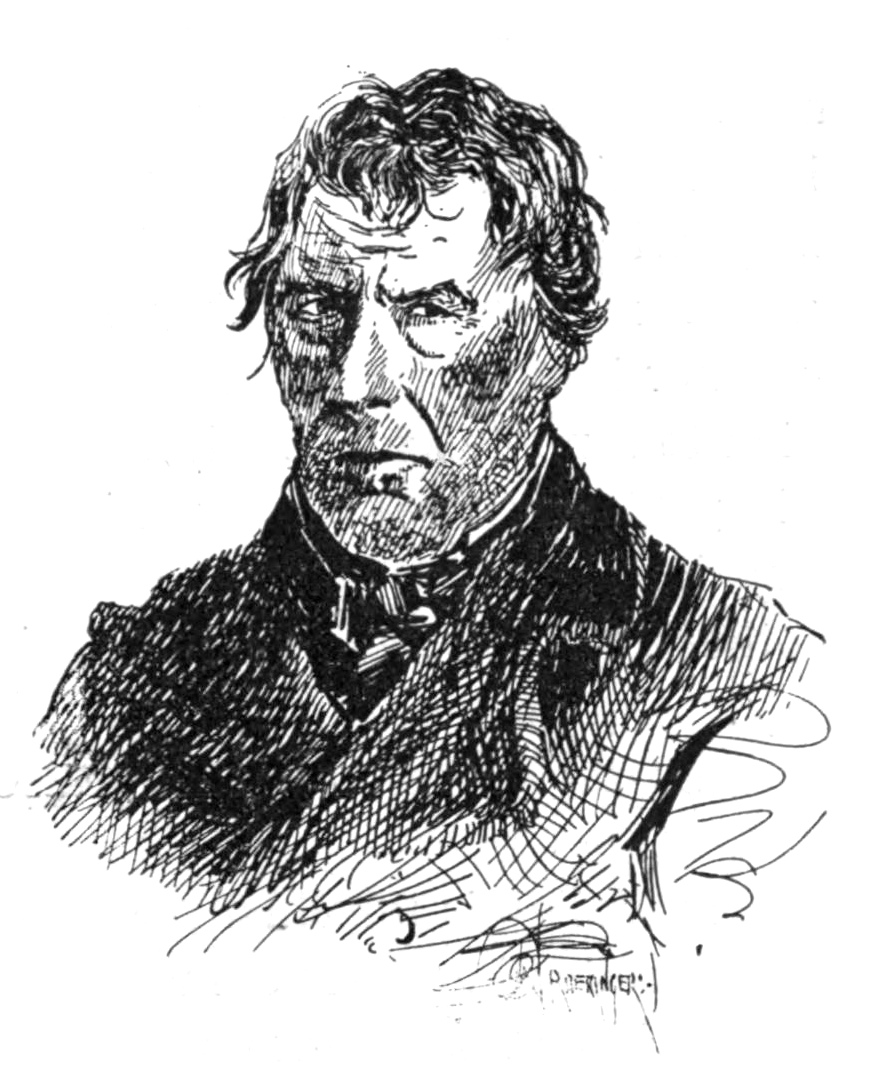

Commandant of the Presidio of San Diego
- In office 1830–1835
- Preceded by: José María Estudillo
- Succeeded by: Pablo de la Portilla

Personal details
- Born: 1791 Monterey, Las Californias, Viceroyalty of New Spain
- Died: 1862 (aged 70–71) Rancho Tía Juana, Baja California, Mexico
- Spouse: María del Pilar Ortega
- Children: 15, including Santiago E. Argüello, José Ramon Argüello
- Occupation: Soldier, Landowner, Politician
- Known for: Californio land grants; Military service in Alta California

Military service
- Allegiance: Mexico
- Rank: Captain
- Battles/wars: Mexican–American War, Bouchard Raid (1818)

Santiago Argüello (1791–1862) was a Californio ranchero, soldier in the Spanish army of the Viceroyalty of New Spain in Las Californias, a major Mexican land grant ranchos owner, and part of an influential family in Mexican Alta California and post-statehood California.

== Family ==
Santiago Argüello was born in Monterey, Las Californias Province of New Spain. He was the son of: José Darío Argüello - a soldier, pioneer in Las Californias, founder of Pueblo de Los Angeles (Los Angeles), twice a Spanish colonial governor (of Alta California and of Baja California); and María Ignacia Moraga - a niece of José Joaquín Moraga, the founder of Pueblo de San José (San Jose). His brother was Luis Antonio Argüello, California's first native-born governor, in office from 1822 to 1825 as Mexican Alta California governor.

Argüello married María del Pilar Ortega in Santa Barbara in 1810, the granddaughter of José Francisco Ortega - Commandant of the Presidios of San Diego, Santa Barbara, Monterey, and Loreto. Also Mayor of Pueblo de San Diego. They had fifteen children together, five in Santa Barbara and ten in San Diego.

Among their children were:

- Santiago E. Argüello, Francisco, Ignacio, José Antonio, José Ramon Argüello, Santiago E. Arguello, Refugia (married to Juan Bandini), Teresa (married to José M. Bandini), María Luisa (married to governor Agustín V. Zamorano), and Concepción (married to Agustin Olvera).

Argüello was tall and stout. His fair complexion and black hair, along with his distinguished manner gave him a 'regal' presence, though his reserved manners caused some to dislike him. He was a man of ability and left an 'honorable' record.

== Career ==
In 1805, Argüello entered the Spanish Army as a cadet in Yerba Buena (present day San Francisco). He spent his Spanish and Mexican military years at the Presidio of San Francisco, the Presidio of Santa Barbara, and the Presidio of San Diego.

Presidio and Pueblo of San Diego

Argüello was paymaster at the Presidio of San Diego in 1818, and in 1821 had a garden in Mission Valley.

Argüello took part in preparations to defend the Presidio against the 1818 Hippolyte de Bouchard Piracy Invasion but, after attacking Mission San Juan Capistrano, Bouchard bypassed San Diego and continued south into Mexico. Post-Mexican Independence (1822), Argüello was lieutenant of the San Diego Company from 1827 to 1831, and commandant from 1830 to 1835. From 1831 to 1835, Argüello was captain of the company and took part, with his brother-in-law Agustín V. Zamorano, in the 1831 revolt against Governor Manuel Victoria. In 1833-34 he was a revenue officer at San Diego.

Argüello helped the pueblo (town) of San Diego in 1835, with other soldiers. They sent a committee of five to the presidio commandant to complain of pueblo residents' hunger, lack of clothing, and back pay due - with a demand for payment to them. The commandant began to put the five soldiers in irons, but the threats of their comrades compelled him to desist. They appealed to the General, who promised justice for the residents, which he administered soon after.

Ranchos

In 1829, Argüello was granted Rancho Tía Juana. From 1838 to 1840 Santiago Argüello was administrator of the Mission San Juan Capistrano, and in 1841 for that service he was granted Rancho Trabuco. In 1846 Argüello was granted Rancho Ex-Mission San Diego from the secularized Mission San Diego de Alcalá lands.

Mexican-American War

During the Mexican–American War he was friendly to the Americans and gave them considerable aid, fighting at Fort Stockton. He welcomed the stabilizing influence of the Americans, as the Mexican Alta California government was in disarray after the ouster of Governor Manuel Micheltorena in 1846.

With his brother-in-law Juan Bandini he issued an appeal not to resist the Americans. U.S. soldiers were quartered at his house and he held a commission as captain in the U.S. California Battalion.

He was a member of the U.S. California military territory legislative council in 1847, and was later made customs collector of the Port of San Diego.

Santiago Argüello died on his Rancho Tía Juana in Baja California, Mexico, in 1862. He is buried at El Campo Santo in San Diego, California. His widow María died in 1878.

== See also ==
- List of Ranchos of California
- List of pre-statehood governors of California
