= Johnson House, Old Town San Diego =

Coordinates: 32°45′17″N 117°11′49″W

Johnson House
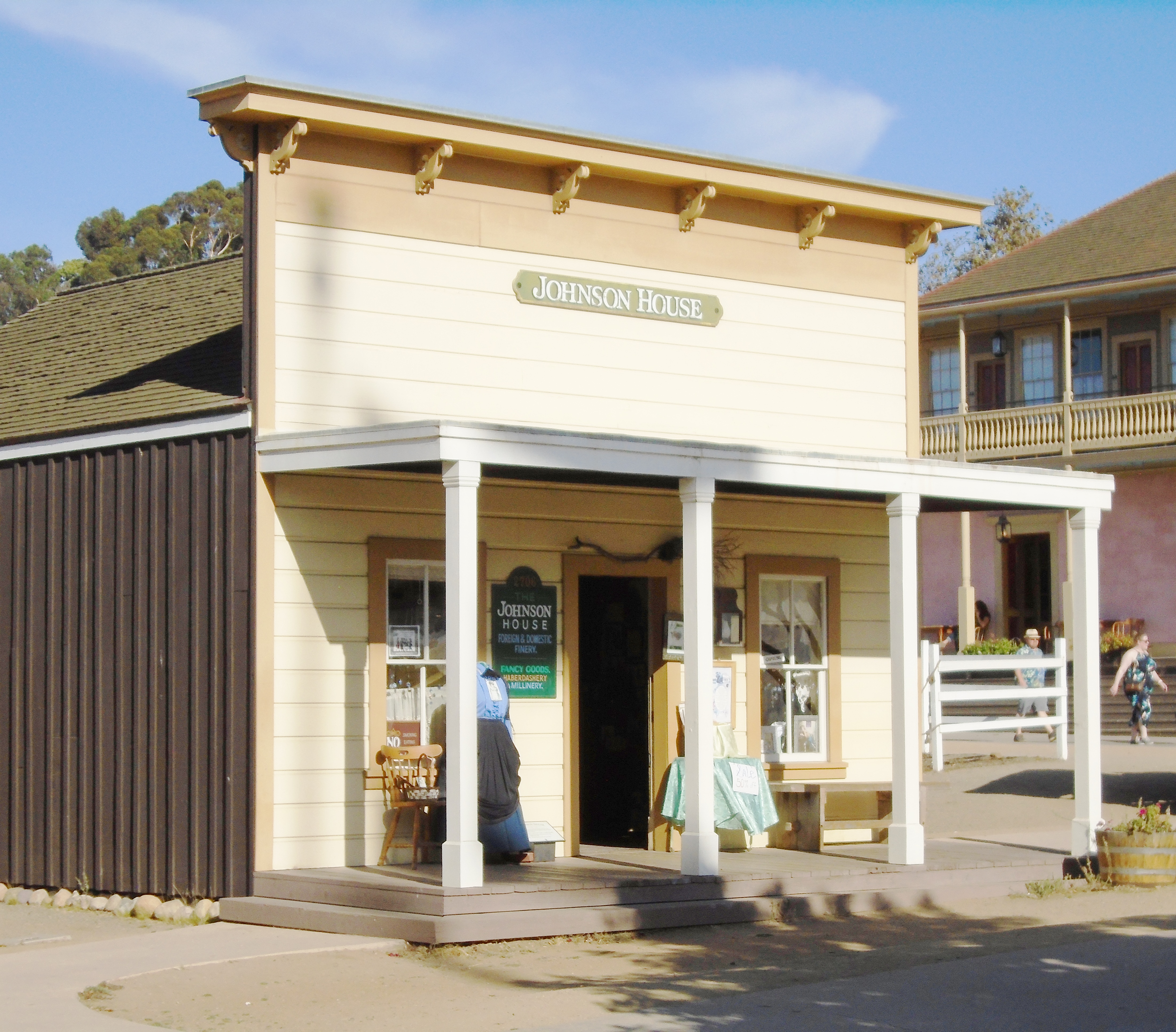
- Johnson House, Old Town San Diego State Historic Park
- Interactive map of the Johnson House area

General information
- Status: Reconstructed
- Type: Historic building
- Location: 2706 San Diego Avenue, 2706 San Diego Avenue, San Diego, United States
- Named for: George Alonzo Johnson
- Year built: 1870
- Completed: 1989 (reconstruction)
- Renovated: 1989
- Client: California State Parks
- Owner: California State Parks

Technical details
- Material: Wood-frame

The Johnson House or Johnson Building is a reconstructed historic building located on Plaza de Las Armas at 2706 San Diego Avenue in Old Town San Diego State Historic Park in San Diego, California.

== History ==
The Johnson House was built in 1870. It was a wood-frame pre-fabricated office building that was brought by ship to San Diego, which was typical of many American buildings in that area at that time. It had a false front and full-length wooden porch. George Alonzo Johnson, a steamboat captain on the Colorado River and owner of the Colorado Steam Navigation Company and of Rancho Santa Maria de Los Peñasquitos, built the building on a vacant lot on La Plaza de Las Armas, in Old Town, which was purchased from Tomasa Pico de Alvarado, his mother-in-law, in 1869.

A few years after 1880, when the Johnsons lost their rancho to their creditors, they moved into this building on the plaza, where the captain died in 1903.

The Johnson House was reconstructed in 1989 by California State Parks. It now operates as a park concession.
