= Juan Bandini =

Peruvian-Mexican-American politician (1800–1859)

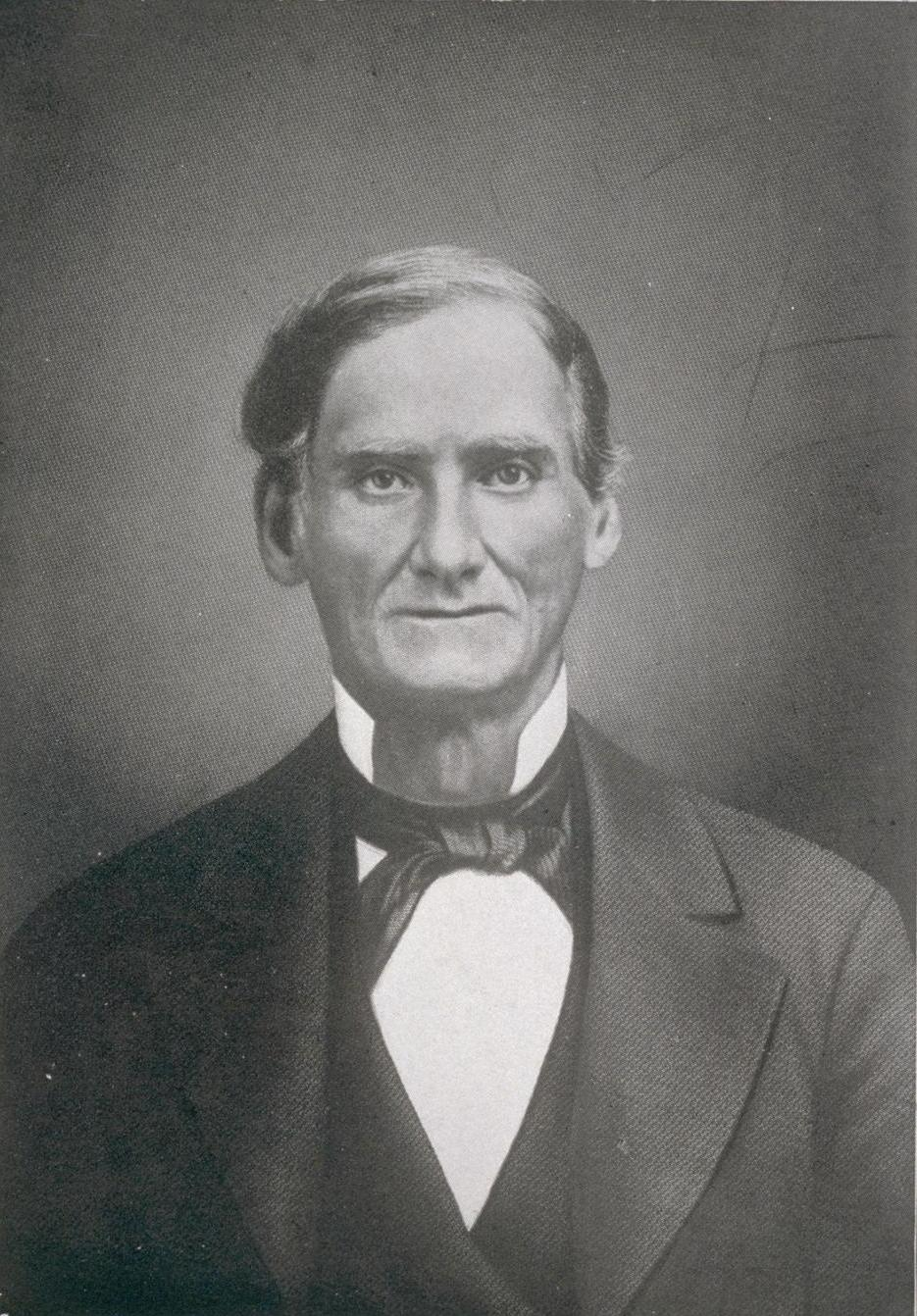

Member of the Congress of the Union of the United Mexican States
- In office 1833–1834
- Constituency: Alta California

Member of the Diputación de Alta California for San Diego
- In office 1827-1828
- Constituency: Presidio de San Diego

Personal details
- Born: 1800 Lima, Viceroyalty of Peru, Spanish Empire
- Died: November 4, 1859 (aged 58-59) Los Angeles, California, United States
- Resting place: Pioneer Park (San Diego); 32.7492°N 117.1776°W
- Spouse(s): Marie de los Dolores Estudillo, Refugia Argüello
- Relations: Abel Stearns (son-in-law); John Tracy Gaffey (grandson-in-law)
- Children: Arcadia

Juan Lorenzo Bruno Bandini (1800 – November 4, 1859) was a Peruvian-born Californio public figure, politician, and ranchero. He is best known for his role in the development of San Diego in the mid-19th century.

His home on Mason and Calhoun Streets, San Diego.

== Early history ==
Bandini was born in 1800 in Lima, Peru, to José Bandini, a Spanish sea captain. His father came to California in 1819 and in 1821 participated in the Mexican War of Independence. After the revolution, his father's family moved to San Diego, arriving on September 1, 1834, on the brig Natalie.

== Marriage and family ==
Bandini married Marie de los Dolores Estudillo on November 20, 1822. She was born c. 1808, daughter of Captain José María Estudillo. They had three daughters, Arcadia, Ysidora, and Josefa, and two sons, Juanito and one who died in childhood.

Bandini's second wife was Refugia Argüello, daughter of Santiago Argüello. They had three sons, Juan de la Cruz, Alfredo, and Arturo, and two daughters, Dolores and Victoria.

Bandini built a large U-shaped house, Casa de Bandini, in 1829. Initially it had 12 rooms and was one-story. Bandini was forced to sell his house in 1859 due to financial losses. Part of the building was converted into a store. His house was later converted to the Cosmopolitan Hotel in 1869, with a second story and wraparound porch added. The house still stands in Old Town San Diego, at the east corner of the town square, and has recently been fully remodeled and reopened as a hotel and restaurant. Originally the house and hotel were not stuccoed—that was added in modern times to make it look "Spanish Colonial".

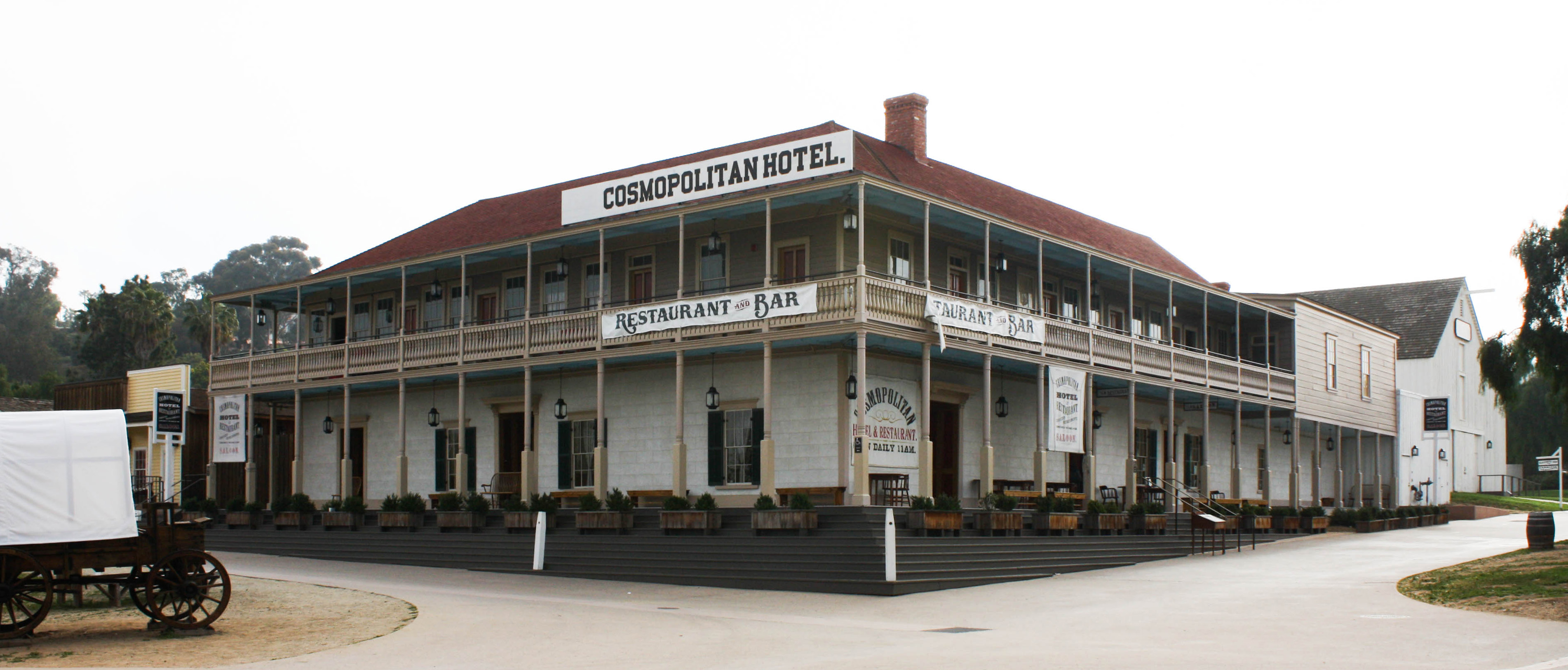
The Casa de Bandini, now the Cosmopolitan Hotel in San Diego

== Civic life ==
Bandini served various public offices such as member of the assembly, sub-comisario of revenues, and substitute congressman.

== Rancho Jurupa ==
Bandini was granted and occupied Rancho Tecate in 1836. However, he was soon driven to abandon it by raids to plunder the ranchos around San Diego by bands of fugitive neophytes, rancho employees, and natives from the interior in 1836–1837. This is now the town of Tecate.

In 1838, the Mexican government granted him Rancho Jurupa in modern-day San Bernardino County and Riverside County.

During the Mexican–American War, Bandini supported the Americans. With Santiago Arguello he issued an appeal to not resist the Americans. After the war, Bandini was increasingly critical of the U.S. government, especially the Land Act of 1851 that allowed Mexican land grants to be challenged. The Treaty of Guadalupe Hidalgo with Mexico, in 1848, had guaranteed the land grants would be recognized.

During March 29–September 27, 1848 he was Juez de Paz (Justice of the Peace) of San Diego Pueblo.

As time allowed, he worked on a sketch of the history of California up to the time of the Yankee changeover.

In 1850 he opened a store in San Diego and built the Gila House hotel. Soon after he moved to Mexico then in 1855 to Los Angeles where he died in 1859.

== Public perception ==
Bandini was known to dress elegantly, and maintained a refined presence in public. He was known for his abilities as a public speaker, writer, dancer, musician, and horseman. His home was the social center of San Diego.

Bandini had a gift of sardonic humor and enjoyed sarcasm. Richard Henry Dana Jr. in Two Years Before the Mast said of him:

"He had a slight and elegant figure, moved gracefully, danced and waltzed beautifully, spoke the best of Castilian, with a pleasant and refined voice and accent, and had throughout the bearing of a man of high birth and figure."

Seeing him again one evening, Dana said:

"He gave us the most graceful dancing that I had ever seen. He was dressed in white pantaloons, neatly made, a short jacket of dark silk gaily figured, white stockings and thin Morocco slippers upon his very small feet."

His lifestyle and hospitality often got him into trouble financially, requiring his children to bail him out in later years.
