= Cosmopolitan Hotel and Restaurant =

- Cosmopolitan Hotel and Restaurant; La Casa de Juan Bandini
- U.S. Historic district – Contributing property
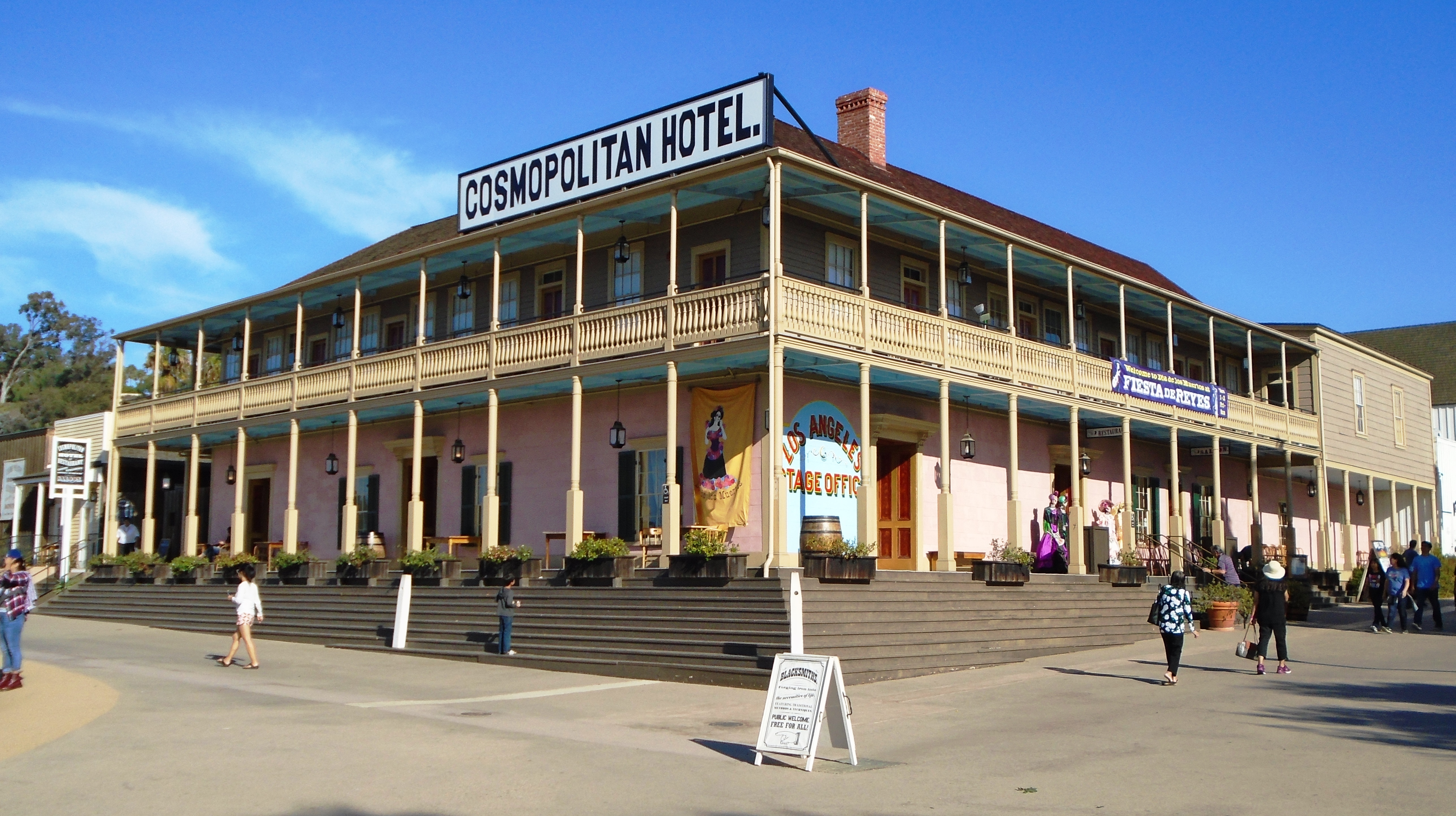
- (2019)

- Location within California Location within the United States
- Location: 2660 Calhoun St. Old Town, San Diego
- Coordinates: 32°45′27″N 117°11′59″W
- Built: 1829
- Architectural style: Spanish Colonial
- Part of: Old Town San Diego Historic District (ID71000182)
- Designated CP: September 3, 1971

The Casa de Bandini, now known as the Cosmopolitan Hotel and Restaurant, is a registered national historic landmark in Old Town San Diego State Historic Park, built in the early 19th century by Juan Bandini and later purchased by Albert Seeley to serve as a stagecoach hotel. In 2010, restorations and added fine dining restaurants revived the hotel to its 1870s charm, making it again a focal point of the original downtown area.

== History ==
The Cosmopolitan Hotel and Restaurant were originally built between 1827 and 1829 as a one floor Spanish colonial style home for cattle rancher Don Juan Bandini. In the 1850s Bandini sold his home, and by 1869 it was restored and extended with a second floor into a stagecoach stop and hotel under the direction of Albert Seeley.

Seeley a stage master, converted the old adobe into an L-shaped Greek Revival hotel. He renovated the original first story and added a wood-framed second story and balconies. The hotel prospered as a stagecoach stop offering 20 rooms for a layover between Los Angeles and San Diego. By 1888, Seeley sold the hotel due to a major shift in railroad use and a rising downtown Gaslamp Quarter. In the following years, it was used as an olive factory.

=== "The Miramar" ===
In 1928 Don Juan Bandini's grandson, Cave J. Couts Jr., son of Cave J. Couts, bought the property in order to restore it as a memorial to his mother Ysidora Bandini de Couts. Couts remodeled the residence in Steamboat Revival architecture style. By 1930 the building was wired for electricity and gas. Cave J. Couts Jr. renames the building as, "The Miramar," a hotel and restaurant.

=== The Miramar is sold to the State of California ===
In 1945 James H. and Nora Cardwell purchased the Bandini property. During the 1950s their son Frank renovated the building into an upscale tourist motel. The Cardwells eventually sold the property to the state of California in 1968, the same year Old Town became a state historic park. The State of California and concessionaire Chef and restaurant owner Joseph Melluso came to an operating agreement. Under the agreement the Hotel would receive necessary historical excavation, and restoration to the period of the Cosmopolitan Hotel.

=== Reopening ===
The Cosmopolitan reopened for business as a Hotel and Restaurant on July 21, 2010, after massive restorations to revitalize it to its 1870s grandeur. By August 2011 Owner Joseph Melluso had sold a majority of ownership over to Catherine Miller. In July 2013, the Cosmo was taken over by Old Town Family Hospitality Corp. Owner and President Chuck Ross.

== Original features ==
Don Juan Bandini built his single-story, thatched roof adobe between 1827 and 1829 on Old Town, San Diego, plaza's southeast corner. The original structure had seven rooms, an entranceway, and enclosed courtyard, a corral, and several sheds. The Casa de Juan Bandini had features of Spanish Colonial architecture usually found only in California missions. During the 1840s, he added several enhancements such as pane-glass windows, a brick-lined patio with a well, and a small, bathhouse to entice his daughters to visit his wife Refugio and him more frequently.

== Hauntings ==
The Cosmopolitan Hotel was featured on Episode 56 of Ghost Adventures which aired October 7, 2011.

== See also ==
- History of San Diego
