= Casa de Stewart =

Historical Landmark in San Diego, California, United States

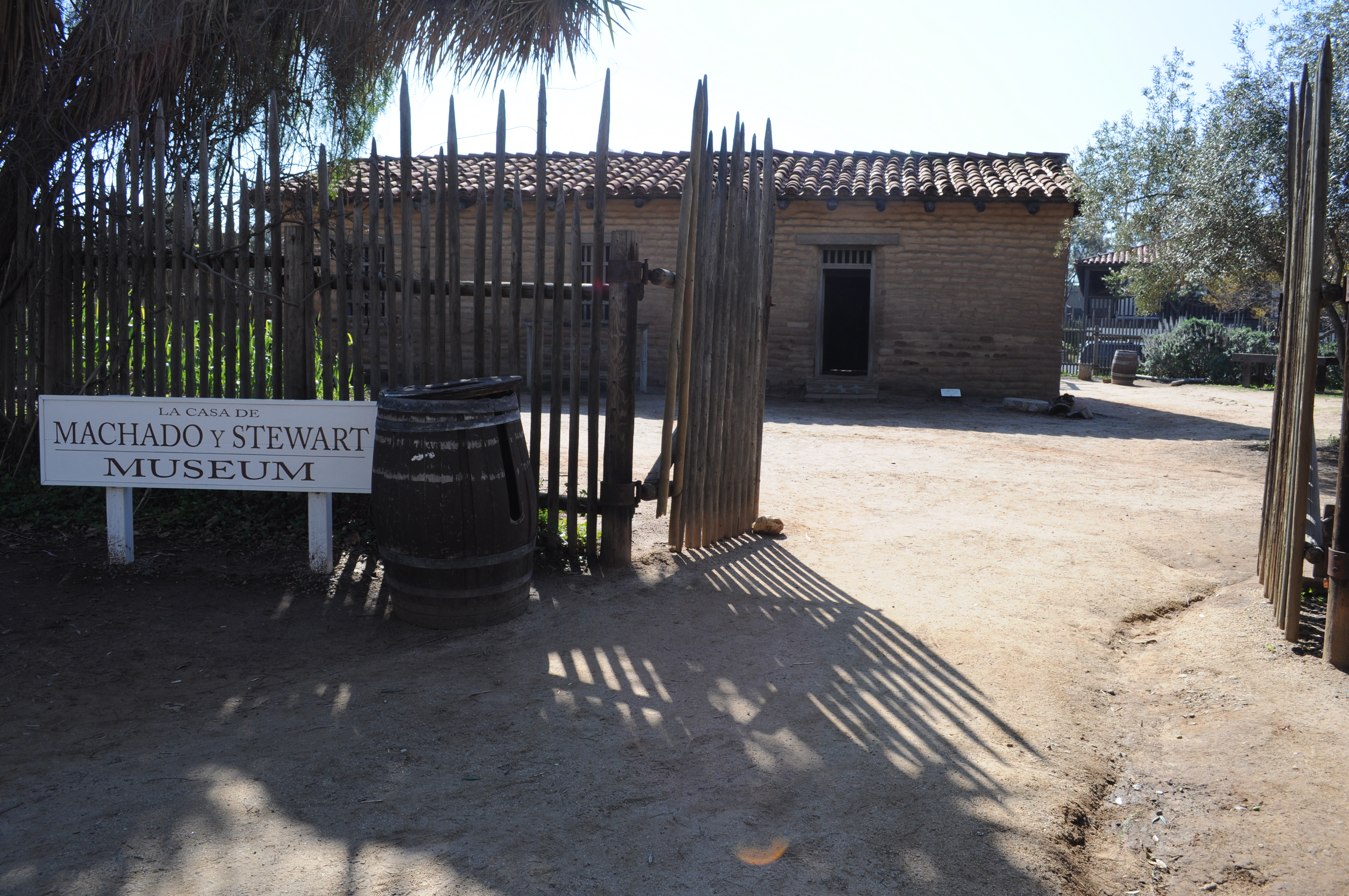
- Casa de Machado y Stewart Museum

- Location within California Location within the United States
- 32.7537°N 117.1963°W
- Location: 2707 Congress Street, San Diego, California

History
- Built: 1835

Site notes
- Architect: Miguel de Pedrorena

California Historical Landmark
- Designated: December 6, 1932
- Reference no.: 73

Casa de Stewart, also called La Casa de Machado y Stewart, is a historical adobe building in San Diego, California, built in 1835. The Casa de Stewart site is a California Historical Landmark No. 73, listed on December 6, 1932.

Casa de Stewart was built by José Manuel Machado, a leatherjacket company soldier of the New Spain Army, stationed in San Diego. Machado built the house for his daughter Rosa. Rosa married Jack Stewart, a pilot boat operator from Maine. The Stewarts eventually enlarged the house. Carmen Stewart Meza lived in the house for 50 years; she moved out after a 1966 flood. Casa de Stewart was acquired by California State Parks, who had it restored to a museum, Casa de Machado y Stewart Museum. The house's current address, is 2707 Congress street, at Congress and Mason Streets, in Old Town, San Diego. Casa de Machado y Silvas, built in 1832, is also a California Historical Landmark.

== Gallery ==
La Casa de Machado y Stewart in Old San Diego in 182, adobe with a new whitewash coat

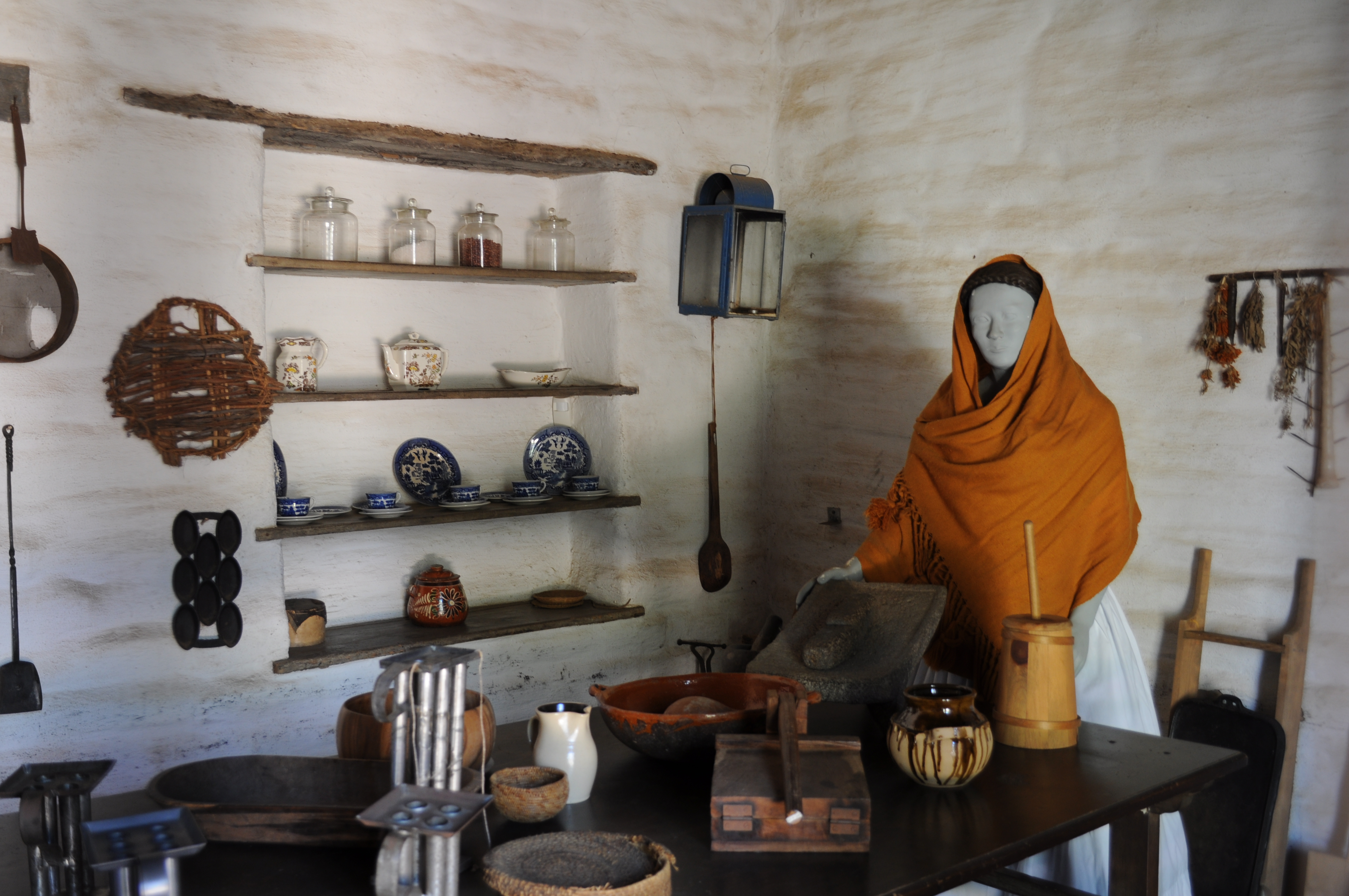
Casa de Machado y Stewart Museum

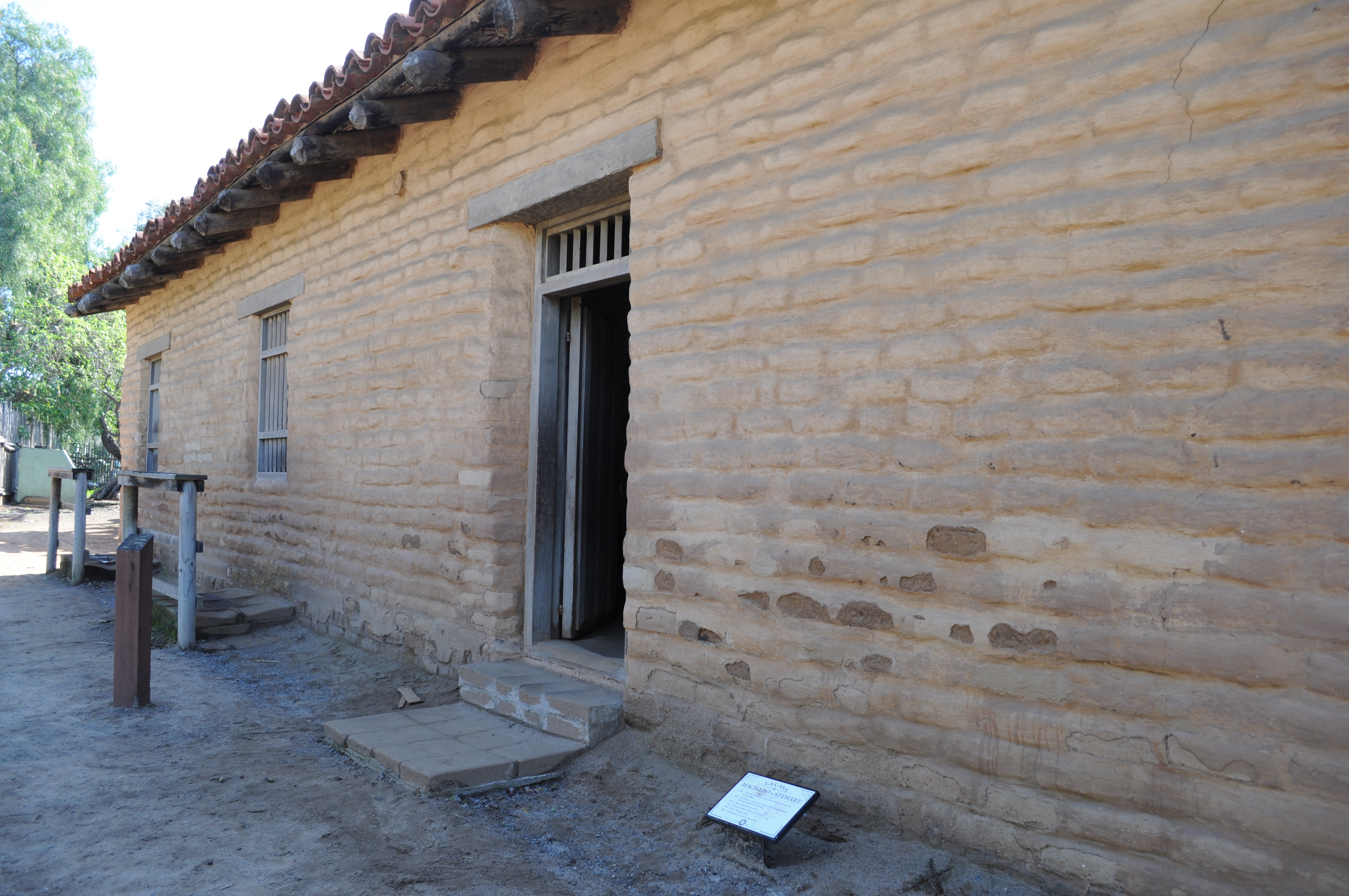
Casa de Machado y Stewart Museum

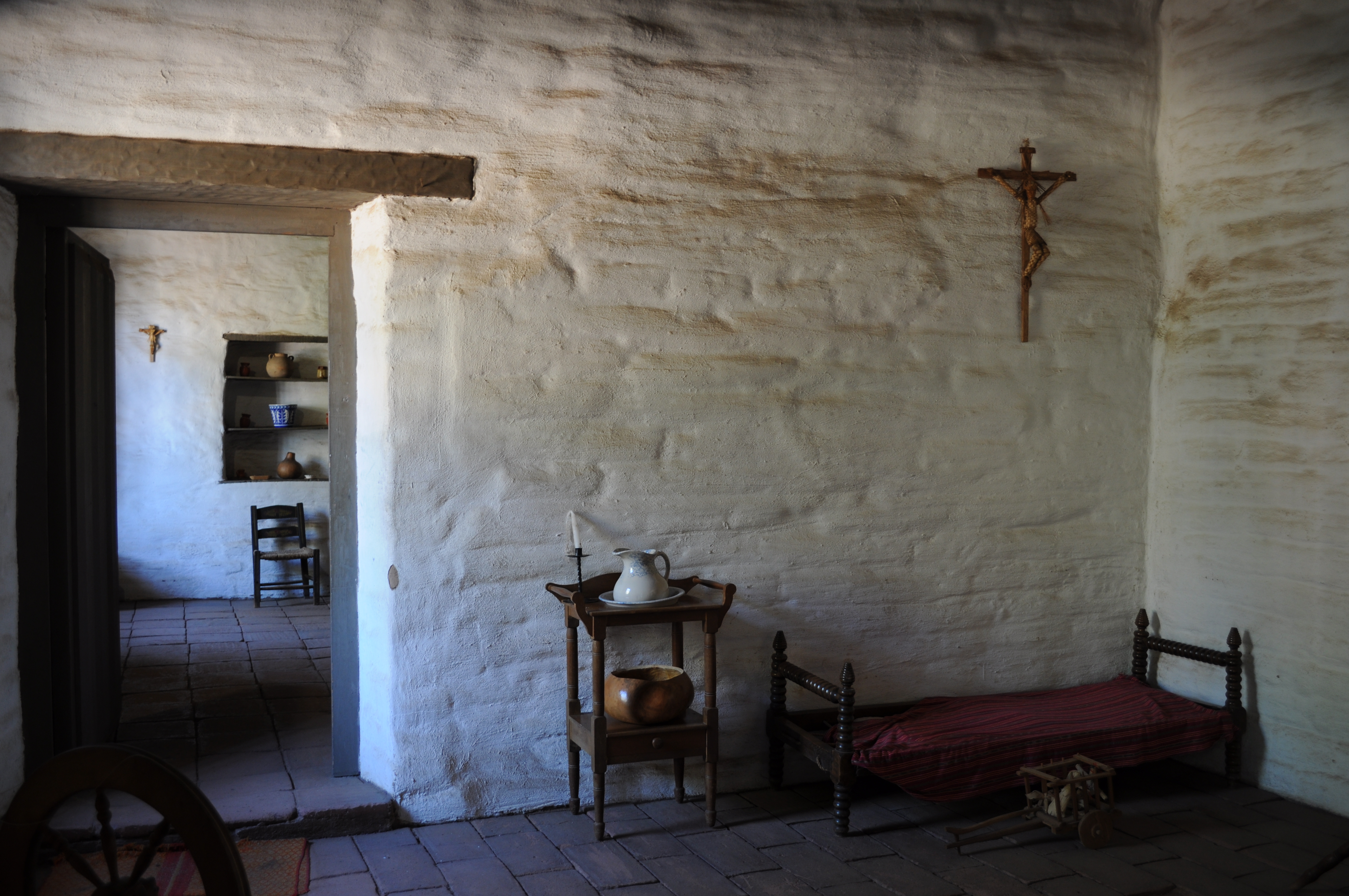
Casa de Machado y Stewart Museum

== See also ==
- California Historical Landmarks in San Diego County
- Adobe Chapel of The Immaculate Conception
- Casa de Carrillo House
- Casa de Estudillo
- Casa de Cota
- Mission San Diego de Alcalá
- Presidio of San Diego
