= Wrightington (surname) =

Wrightington is a surname. Notable people with the surname include:

- Edgar Wrightington (1875-1945), American college football player and coach
- Edward Wrightington (born c. 1580) was an English lawyer and politician
- Juana Wrightington (1814 – 1901), Alta California pioneer and nurse
- Thomas Wrightington (c. 1797 – 1853),early settler of San Diego, California.
