= Thomas W. Sutherland =

American politician (1817–1859)

United States Attorney for the District of Wisconsin
- In office June 12, 1848 – 1848
- Appointed by: James K. Polk
- Preceded by: William Pitt Lynde (Wisconsin Territory)
- Succeeded by: A. Hyatt Smith

United States Attorney for the Wisconsin Territory
- In office April 27, 1841 – 1845
- Appointed by: John Tyler
- Preceded by: Moses M. Strong
- Succeeded by: William Pitt Lynde

1st Village President of Madison, Wisconsin
- In office 1846–1847
- Preceded by: Position Established
- Succeeded by: Alexander L. Collins

District Attorney of San Diego County
- In office 1851–1852
- Preceded by: William C. Ferrell
- Succeeded by: James W. Robinson

Alcalde of San Diego (Acting)
- In office March 1850 – 1850
- Preceded by: Dennis Gahagan
- Succeeded by: Joshua Bean (Mayor)

Personal details
- Born: 1817 Philadelphia, Pennsylvania
- Died: February 2, 1859 (aged 41–42) Sacramento, California
- Cause of death: Pulmonary edema
- Resting place: Cypress Lawn Memorial Park (re-interred); Colma, California; Lone Mountain Cemetery (original); San Francisco, California
- Party: Democratic
- Spouses: Joanna Hudson; (m. 1841)
- Children: Thomas A. Sutherland; (b. 1850; died 1891)
- Parent: Joel Barlow Sutherland (father)
- Profession: lawyer, politician

Thomas W. Sutherland (c. 1817 – February 2, 1859) was an American lawyer and pioneer settler of Wisconsin and California. He was the first village president of Madison, Wisconsin, was United States attorney for Wisconsin for several years in the 1840s, was a member of the first Board of Regents of the University of Wisconsin, and was the last alcalde (mayor) of San Diego, California, prior to statehood.

He was the eldest son of Joel Barlow Sutherland of Philadelphia, who had been a militia officer in the War of 1812 and served as a Member of Congress when Thomas was a child.

== Early life and career ==
Thomas W. Sutherland was born c. 1817 in Pennsylvania (he is listed as 33 in the 1850 San Diego Census). In 1835, he traveled to Indiana as a clerk for Henry Leavitt Ellsworth, who had just become commissioner of the U.S. Patent Office and had been tasked by the U.S. government to travel there to make a treaty with an Indian tribe. Ellsworth returned east from here, but Sutherland, at age 18, traveled west, meeting a cousin near St. Louis. They traveled together, exploring parts of what is now Iowa and Minnesota. He followed a river route from the Saint Anthony Falls to the location that would later become Madison, Wisconsin, which at the time was still inhabited only by the Ho-Chunk. He spent some time living with the Indians on the shore of Lake Monona and determined that this would become his future home. He returned briefly to Philadelphia to make preparations, then returned to Madison to purchase his lot as soon as land became available under the newly organized Wisconsin Territory.

== Wisconsin ==
He was admitted to the Pennsylvania Bar Association in 1839 and formed a legal partnership in Wisconsin with David Brigham with the endorsement of his father and several other notable politicians. In 1840, at the first session of court in Dane County, Sutherland was one of the first lawyers admitted to practice law in the territory, along with Edward V. Whiton (later Chief Justice of the Wisconsin Supreme Court), John Hubbard Tweedy, and Morgan Lewis Martin (later congressional delegates for the territory).

In 1841 he married Joanna Hudson (born c.1822), the daughter of Philadelphia Doctor Edward Hudson. That same year, he was appointed United States Attorney for the Wisconsin Territory by President John Tyler and remained in that role until the inauguration of James K. Polk in 1845. In 1846, Madison was formally incorporated as a Village and Sutherland became the first President of the Village of Madison. That same year, he became one of the founders of the Wisconsin Historical Society and served as the first Secretary of the organization under President A. Hyatt Smith.

In 1848, after Wisconsin became the 30th state, Sutherland was again named United States Attorney to fill the vacancy created by William Pitt Lynde, who had resigned after he was elected to Wisconsin's first congressional delegation. In that consequential year, the new state legislature formalized the state University and established the first Board of Regents. Sutherland was appointed to the Board of Regents by Governor Nelson Dewey, along with other early Wisconsin dwellers Edward V. Whiton, Alexander L. Collins, John H. Rountree, and Rufus King.

== California ==
In the spring of 1849, Sutherland left Wisconsin for California, which had just been annexed by the United States in the Mexican–American War. He traveled over land with a group including Count Agoston Haraszthy and his family. He settled in San Diego, where, in 1850, he served as the final Alcalde (Mayor) of San Diego prior to California becoming a state. That year, on May 5, he and his wife welcomed a son, Thomas, who is claimed to be the first "white" child born in the territory. He then became District Attorney for San Diego County in 1851. They moved to San Francisco in 1852, where Sutherland continued his law practice. He died on February 2, 1859, in Sacramento, California, and was buried at Lone Mountain Cemetery in San Francisco.

== See also ==
- Thomas W. Sutherland biography in Smythe's History of San Diego
- Thomas A. Sutherland obituary
- 1850 Census, San Diego, California, p. 278A
