= José de Züñiga =

Spanish commadant of presidios in North America

José de Zúñiga
- Born: 1755; Cuautitlán, New Spain
- Died: after 1806
- Relatives: Son: Ignacio Zúñiga
- Military career
- Allegiance: Spanish Empire
- Branch: Spanish Army
- Rank: Captain
- Commands: Commandant of Presidio of San Diego; Commandant of Presidio of Tucson
- Conflicts: Campaigns against Apache; Campaign to Zuni pueblos (1795)

José de Zúñiga (1755–after 1806) was a Spanish soldier and commandant of presidios in California, Arizona, and Chihuahua.

== Biography ==
Zúñiga was born 1755 in Cuautitlán, near Mexico City, to Spanish parents.

He enlisted as a cadet in the Spanish Army on October 18, 1772. His initial army experience came through campaigns against the native Apaches. In 1780 he was promoted to lieutenant while stationed at the Presidio of San Carlos de Cerro Gordo, near the Big Bend Country along the Rio Grande. In 1781 Lt. Zúñiga led his troops to Mission San Gabriel.

He became Commandant of the Presidio of San Diego on September 8, 1781, and served in that post until October 19, 1793. While there, he maintained good relations with the missionaries and the native people, and was also well-regarded for reducing corruption in the presidio. He found a deficit in the books for $7000. The previous quartermaster/paymaster, Rafael Pedro y Gil, was arrested and sent to San Blas, Nayarit.

In 1782 Zúñiga laid a road from San Diego Bay to the presidio. That same year he also oversaw the construction of the Presidio chapel. He also ordered a statue of the Immaculate Conception (which is now at Mission San Luis Rey). In a letter to his mother in Mexico City, he proudly described the chapel and sent money to purchase "carmine, vermillion and other painting materials", garden and flower seeds, and to send any Dramas she can spare to read. In 1784, Zúñiga became a member of the third order of Franciscans.

In 1792, Zúñiga was promoted to captain and assigned to the Presidio of Tucson, but had to wait until his successor as Commandant of San Diego arrived. He was still in San Diego when George Vancouver arrived with the Vancouver Expedition, and was part of the party that greeted him.

Zúñiga arrived in Tucson in 1794, where he served until 1806. While in Tucson, he led a campaign to the Zuni pueblos in 1795. After 1806, he moved on to the Arizpe presidio, where he served as assistant inspector of the presidios.

Zúñiga had at least two sons. His son Ignacio was born in 1796 in Tucson. He had a previous son born 1783 as the result of an affair with Teresa Morillo, wife of an enlisted man, Manuel Nieto.

== See also ==
- Bancroft, Hubert Howe, The History of California (1884) Vol I. 1542–1800, pp. 451–452, 645–656
- "Don Joseph de Zuniga Second Commandant of the San Diego Presidio" (Santa Barbara Trust for Historic Preservation)
