= Philip Crosthwaite =

American politician (1825–1903)

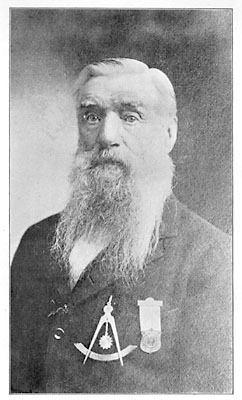
- Philip in 1847
- Born: December 27, 1825; Athy, County Kildare, Ireland
- Died: February 19, 1903 (aged 78); San Diego, California
- Known for: Being an early settler of California

Philip Crosthwaite (December 27, 1825 – February 19, 1903) was an early settler of San Diego, California, and Rosarito, Baja California.

== Early life ==
Philip Crosthwaite was born 1825, in Athy, County Kildare, Ireland, to Edward and Rachel Crosthwaite. His parents were visiting their old home, having emigrated to the United States some years before. On returning to America, Philip was left in the care of his grandparents in Ireland and lived with them until 16, when he visited his mother.

In 1843, he returned to Ireland to complete his education, and entered Trinity College, Dublin. When his grandmother died in 1845 and he came to America for a second visit, intending to return and complete his education. But while in Philadelphia, he met a young man from Boston with whom he struck up an acquaintance, and for a "lark" these two determined to take a short sea voyage. Going to Newport, Rhode Island, they shipped on board the schooner Hopewell, thinking they were on a fishing trip to the Newfoundland banks. Too late, they learned the ship was bound for San Francisco, Alta California (then a Mexican territory). They begged so hard to be put ashore that the captain finally promised to allow them to return by the first ship they met; but they never met a ship until they reached San Diego Bay. Crosthwaite and his friend, Rhead, jumped ship in San Diego. An east-bound ship came, but there was room for only one. They tossed for the berth and Crosthwaite lost, so he remained in San Diego.

== Mexican–American War in San Diego ==
In 1846, when the Mexican–American War broke out, Crosthwaite was on an otter hunting expedition on the Baja California coast, with Julian Ames, John Post, John C. Stewart, and William Curley. Learning of the war at the Misión Nuestra Señora del Santísimo Rosarito de Viñacado near El Rosario, Baja California, they all returned to San Diego and served in the Battle of San Pasqual. They reached the town late at night, and were wakened by a loud knock on the door early in the morning.

It was Captain Gillespie, U.S. Marine Corps, who said: "There can be no neutrals in this country; you must either enlist for three months (as the war will probably be over by that time), or be imprisoned on the [USS] Congress." He intended to enlist, anyway, but the choice was made easy. A good deal of the local color concerning the Battle of San Pasqual came from Crosthwaite's accounts, as he served from start to finish. He was slightly wounded by the Californio Lancers during the battle on December 6, 1846. After the U.S. Dragoons and other forces left for the capture of Los Angeles, he performed garrison duty until the close of the war.

== San Diego under U.S. rule ==
In 1847 Crosthwaite was appointed Suplente (Substitute Justice of the Peace or Mayor) of Pueblo de San Diego.

Crosthwaite married María Josefa López, daughter of Bonifacio López, of San Diego in Ensenada, Baja California, on June 10, 1848, 1 month after independence from Mexico, at San Diego. López was a great-great-granddaughter of Basilio Rosas, one of 11 families who settled Los Angeles in 1781. Crosthwaite and López had seven sons and three daughters, including Francisco, Felipe, Eduardo, Marcos, Santiago, Carlos, Lizzie, Guillermo. His daughter Mary married J. N. Briseño, of San Diego. His daughter Josefa married Julio Osuna, the grandson of Juan María Osuna, the first Alcalde of San Diego and grantee of Rancho San Dieguito (now Rancho Santa Fe). Most of the family remained in Baja California after the purchase of Rancho San Miguel in 1861 when the cattle were herded south from Rancho Paguay (Poway) in San Diego County. Many of the descendants of Crosthwaite still live in Playas de Rosarito, where some use the surname spelled as "Croswaithe". Jorge Croswaithe is now president of the Red Cross and Rafael Croswaithe was a candidate for the local government in the 2007 Baja California state elections. Many other family members are scattered between Baja California, in Mexico, and Southern California in the United States. Writer Luis Humberto Crosthwaite lives in Tijuana.

During the California Gold Rush in 1849, Crosthwaite went north briefly to mine gold. He didn't get rich, but did bring back 47 ounces (1,350 grams) of gold.

In 1851, Crosthwaite served in the Garra Insurrection, with the rank of third sergeant. After these troubles, he was the mainstay of the citizens in preserving the peace, at the time when a gang was terrorizing the town, and was seriously wounded.

Crosthwaite held a number of offices at an early day, being the first county treasurer (1850), deputy sheriff several years, and sheriff one or two terms. He was also school commissioner in 1850, county clerk and recorder in 1853–54, and justice of the peace in 1854. He lived for several years in Mission Valley, above Old Town, and later owned Rancho San Miguel in Baja California. He was lessee of Mission San Diego de Alcalá in 1848, and later joined the gold rush. He also kept a store in Old Town, and later in new San Diego, in partnership with Thomas Whaley. His old ledger, kept in 1853, later owned by Joseph Jessop, shows many curious things. The first entry in it shows the sale of over $200 worth of provisions to Lieutenant Derby, for the use of the Indians working on the San Diego River dam. The prices are now seen as interesting.

== Ranch and city life ==
Crosthwaite purchased Rancho San Miguel, near Ensenada, Baja California, in 1861 and moved there, but still spent much of his time in San Diego. He was an active in the San Diego Lodge of the Freemasons. Crosthwaite visited his sister in San Andreas, California, where her husband William Jeff Gatewood was publishing the San Andreas Register. Crosthwaite suggested that Gatewood move the paper to San Diego, which didn't have a newspaper then. He did and the first issue of San Diego Union was issued October 10, 1868. Crosthwaite was appointed Chief of Police in San Diego in 1869. The same year, he partnered with Thomas Whaley to run a store in Old Town.

== Death ==
Crosthwaite died 1903 in San Diego. He is buried in an unmarked plot in the Masonic section of Mount Hope Cemetery, but it was since marked by the Masons in 1968. He had almost fifty grandchildren at the time of his death.

== Character and personality ==
Crosthwaite was a well-built man, with a full beard and a remarkably deep voice. An uncle-in-law, Mr. Hempstead, stopped off at La Playa (between Old Town and Point Loma) on his way to San Francisco in the 1850s, and recognized him by his voice, although he hadn't seen him for years. He was known to be a fearless man, whose courage was proved in many hard encounters. He was a man of strong character and had enemies as well as friends. Part of these troubles were due to religious differences, he being an Episcopalian and his wife a Catholic. He was fond of telling his recollections of early days, often in a joking manner.
