= Harry Harkness =

American racing driver (1880–1919)

- Born: Harry Stephen Harkness; July 17, 1880 Eureka, Kansas, U.S.
- Died: January 23, 1919 (aged 38) New York, New York, U.S.

Harry Stephen Harkness (July 17, 1880 – January 23, 1919) was an American racing driver, aviator, and playboy.

== Early life ==
Harkness was born in Kansas on July 17, 1880 to Standard Oil heir Lamon V. Harkness.

== Auto racing ==
Harkness was an avid race car driver, and won the first Mount Washington Hillclimb Auto Race. One of his more famous races was against Henry Ford. Harkness led a group of investors who bought the Sheepshead Bay Race Track, a thoroughbred horse racing facility they converted to use as an auto racing track. Following Harkness' unexpected death the facility was sold to real estate developers.

As a noted racer of the day, Harkness was retroactively awarded a 1902 American Automobile Association National Championship in 1951 by revisionist sportswriter Russ Catlin. 1902 was the first year the AAA Contest Board sanctioned racing. During a visit to Paris that year Harkness encountered young Austrian-born Joe Jagersberger, convincing Jagersberger to emigrate to the United States in pursuit of a racing career.

== Aviation ==
Harkness financed the building of many early airplanes. On March 4, 1911, he contracted early aviator Charles F. Walsh to build an airplane for use by his chief mechanic John Kiley at the Harkness camp established on North Island in San Diego, CA.

Walsh delivered the plane to the aviation camp at North Island on April 7, 1911. This Harkness airplane was a Curtiss copy, but with four Farman-type ailerons mounted flush to the end of all four wings replacing the Curtiss-style ailerons normally located between the upper and lower wing. It was powered by a seven-cylinder Macomber rotary engine that reportedly weighed 250 pounds, generated 450 pounds of thrust, and produced 60 hp to turn an eight-foot propeller. According to at least one source, Walsh added "silver dust" to the unbleached muslin of the flying surfaces. This earned the aircraft the name "Silver Dart".

== Boating ==
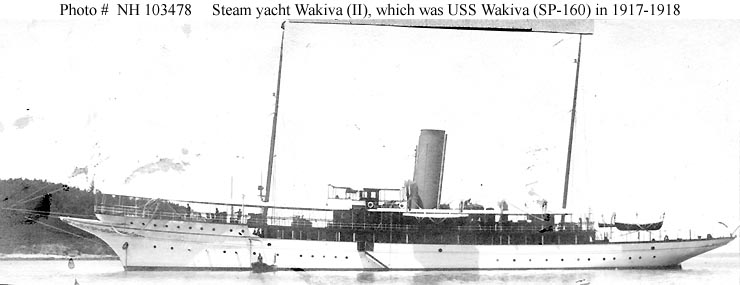
Harkness' yacht Wakivia II

In 1918, Harkness' personal yacht was taken by the United States Navy, becoming USS Wakiva II (SP-160) and was credited with sinking 3 German U-boats during World War I. Harkness sued the U.S. government in 1918 because he did not believe that he was adequately compensated for the value of his yacht.

== Personal life, and death ==
In 1918, Harkness commissioned the prestigious Schmieg/Hungate/Kotzian furniture manufacturer to exclusively create the Artcase for his Steinway Model B from Steinway & Sons. The piano was discovered in a mansion in 2008 and was fully restored.

Harkness died of influenza in 1919, at his home, 270 Park Avenue, New York - four years following the death of his father.

Following his death, his first wife, Marie M. Cowan (née Harkness, née Marbeck), whom he married in 1906 and divorced in 1916, sued for his entire $20 million estate, claiming Harkness was of unsound mind when leaving the estate to his second wife, Florence Streuber Harkness (née Gaines).
