= Charles Francis Walsh =

American aviator (1877–1912)

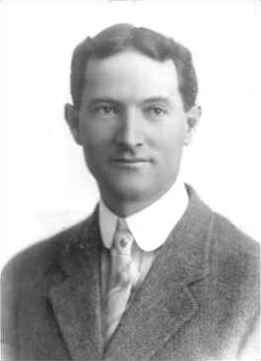
- Charles Francis Walsh in 1910
- Born: 27 October 1877; Mission Valley, California, United States
- Died: 3 October 1912 (aged 34); Trenton, New Jersey, United States
- Burial place: Calvary Cemetery, San Diego
- Occupation: Aviator
- Known for: Aviation pioneer

Charles Francis Walsh (October 27, 1877 – October 3, 1912) was an American pioneer aviator who died in a crash in Trenton, New Jersey.

Description of airplane commissioned by Harry Harkness for use by John Kiley at North Island that was manufactured by Charles F. Walsh

== Early life ==
Charles Francis Walsh was born in Mission Valley, California, on October 27, 1877, to Mr. and Mrs. Walter C. Walsh. When he was a young boy, the family moved to nearby San Diego, California. Growing up, he worked in his father's grocery store. Enterprising even at an early age, he started his own bicycle business as a teenager, but this would be the first of several unsuccessful ventures for Walsh until his early thirties. In 1901, at the age of 24, he hitchhiked to Los Angeles and took a job as a stationary engineer at the California General Hospital in Los Angeles. It was there that he met a young nursing student named Alice Connolly. They were married on September 23, 1903.

In January 1904, he and his new wife moved to Winslow, Arizona, where he went to work for the Union Pacific Railroad as a freight train engineer. Charles grew impatient during what turned out to be a long and frustrating apprenticeship, so he moved back to Los Angeles to work in an oil refinery as a field engineer. It was not long, however, before they ventured to Goldfield, Nevada, to seek their share of the gold fortune believed to be there. At first, the Walshes were able to make decent money supporting the blossoming mining industry of the town. The couple did return to Los Angeles in the spring of 1905 to give birth to their son Kenneth, while Charles briefly returned to work in the oil fields. They returned to Goldfield a short time later. Alice gave birth to a daughter (Juanita) there the following year. When Goldfield died a quick death in 1907, however, a financially troubled Walsh was forced to move his family into his father's house at 17th and K streets in San Diego.

Charles found work as an elevator operator in a local hotel. Walsh became fascinated with aviation from reading about the subject in the local newspapers. Using only pictures from these newspapers, he sketched his own airplane design in between elevator trips at work and was determined to fly it one day. In 1909, Walsh convinced a small group of local investors to open the first airplane manufacturing company in California.

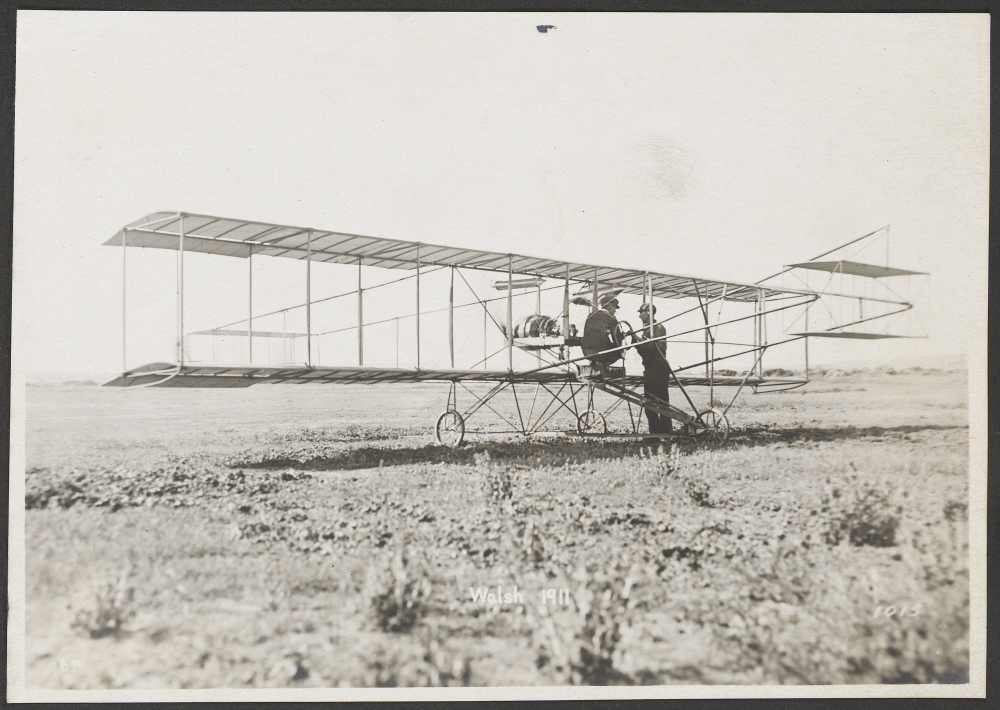

== First airplane ==
The San Diego Aeroplane Manufacturing Company incorporated on August 25, 1909, capitalized at $200,000. The company was located in room 432 of the Keating Building on the corner of Fifth and F Streets in downtown San Diego. Walsh was vice president and general manager. He built his airplane in the old Rogers carriage shop on Third Street (between E and F Streets) near the company headquarters. This location is now a parking garage for the Westfield Horton Plaza.

By late November, Walsh had essentially completed his airplane. Built from seasoned spruce and piano wire it measured 40 feet long with a 50-foot wingspan. It was reported to be the largest monoplane in the world at the time. Like the Wright Brothers design, a motor drove twin pusher propellers through a bicycle chain. The propellers were seven feet long and made of Oregon pine with hickory hubs. Like Curtiss, he used a tricycle type landing gear and ailerons vice the Wright's wing warping method for lateral control of his Bleriot-type monoplane. His wings tapered from curved in the middle to flat ends. The reason given for this is that the newspaper picture he used as his template for the design had the ends of the wings cutoff, so that is how he thought they looked. Attached to these was his specially designed device to automatically provide lateral stability to his airplane. This consisted of a fifteen-pound weight suspended from a five-foot rod which was connected to both wingtips. As air flow acted on the wings, the weight would act as to raise on wingtip and lower the other, maintaining lateral stability without pilot input. For control, Walsh designed a dual lever system, closely resembling that of the Wright Brothers. One controlled the engine and one controlled the pitch. It was powered by a 30 H. P. Cameron automobile engine.

Walsh tested his airplane at the Coronado Island Country Club racetrack during the last week of December. He was one of three local San Diego aviators, including Waldo Waterman, attempting to enter an airplane in the 1910 Los Angeles International Air Meet at Dominguez Field. The airplane was damaged during ground runs at Coronado on December 29. His wife Alice sold her jewelry so that he could attend the event as a spectator. While there, he made the most of the opportunity to learn about airplane design from the most legendary pioneers in aviation. When it was decided that San Diego would host its own air meet immediately following the one in Los Angeles, Walsh hurried home to incorporate what he learned into his own design as he rebuilt his airplane ahead of the event.

He shortened his wingspan by approximately five feet, shortened the front elevator support assembly by ten feet, and added a "horizontal plane" over the rear rudder. He also removed one of his rear rudders and abandoned his problematic chain-drive, dual-propeller configuration for a single-propeller, direct-drive system. Walsh ordered a new six-foot propeller and intended to purchase one from Charles K. Hamilton upon his arrival at Coronado for the 1910 San Diego Aviation Meet. All of this yielded a 100-pound savings in weight and better controllability. His Cameron engine was raised two feet above the lower level of the main frame and produced 2000 rpm.

=== 1910 San Diego Aviation Meet ===
During the 1910 Los Angeles International Air Meet at Dominguez Field, Charles K. Hamilton was invited by some San Diego businessmen to come to Coronado Island and attempt to beat the altitude record that Louis Paulhan set during that meet. For the people of San Diego, the event was about attracting aviation to San Diego and raising money for the Panama–California Exposition the city planned to host in 1915. Glenn Curtiss was in search of a suitable location for a winter headquarters and asked Hamilton to scout out San Diego for him. He loaned Hamilton his Curtiss No. 2 "Reims Racer" for this purpose. The 1910 San Diego Aviation Meet was scheduled for January 23–25. Charles F. Walsh was guaranteed the first $500 in profits to demonstrate his airplane on the opening day of the meet. Walsh destroyed his airplane during his demonstration on the opening day of the meet when he was forced to taxi his airplane into a fence to avoid hitting Hamilton and the Reims Racer. Two days later, Hamilton took Walsh along for a flight as a passenger in the Reims Racer. This was the first flight for Walsh.

== Amateur aviation career ==
=== Imperial Beach, California ===
Following the San Diego Aviation Meet, Walsh built a new airplane in less than 30 days. He was invited by a San Diego developer named E W Peterson to move his airplane to nearby Imperial Beach, California. Peterson had three 30-foot-wide by 600-foot-long runways graded for this purpose. Around April 1, 1910, Walsh began developing an aviation camp there while testing his new airplane. The plane was a nearly exact copy of the Reims Racer in which he had flown as a passenger with Charles K. Hamilton. Walsh added features of his own design that he hoped would simplify controllability, however. Instead of a shoulder yoke for lateral control, Walsh mounted the steering wheel to a post on a double hinge, allowing for dual-axis control to operate the ailerons in addition to the elevators via a wire connection to the ailerons from the base of the control yoke. The engine-shutoff and starting wheel brake were controlled by a single lever fastened directly over the left side of the foot rest. The same motion of the foot-operated both devices. The engine speed lever was still connected to the frame next to the pilot. A day or two later, Walsh added a thrust bearing to his engine, yielding an additional 25% increase in speed. On April 10, 1910, approximately 100 onlookers witnessed his first flight. Reaching an altitude of 15–20 feet, he flew for approximately 400 feet over the Imperial Beach runway before executing a reportedly flawless landing.

By late May, he had already turned down offers to perform during the Fourth of July celebration of Baker City, Oregon; St. Louis, Missouri; and Philadelphia, Pennsylvania. The personal expense to him for such long-distance trips made him concentrate on opportunities closer to San Diego. He also made significant improvements to his airplane by this time, adding steel-rimmed wheels for his landing gear and installing a more advanced propeller. To compensate for the aft center of gravity resulting from the increased weight of his engine relative to the one that powered the Reims Racer that he faithfully modeled his airplane after, he modified his tail to a box design, vice the single elevator.

On June 2, Walsh suffered a major setback when his airplane crashed following a steep turn during a practice run on the aviation course. It was quickly determined that his engine could not provide sufficient thrust to maintain altitude at steep angles of bank. While this accident almost convinced Walsh to abandon aviation altogether, fellow Imperial Beach aviator B F Roehrig began an effort to raise money for a better engine. He had made over 40 flights at this point. Most were straight and level below 50 ft covering distances of 100 to 1000 feet as he gained confidence in himself and his airplane. On the Fourth of July, he performed three aerial demonstrations at Imperial Beach before a crowd of 300–400 curious onlookers. Later that month, Walsh acquired a more powerful 40 hp Elbridge engine, which he rented from another San Diego aviation hopeful. The more powerful engine quickly gave him the confidence to take his aviation to a larger venue.

=== Los Angeles ===
By early September, 1910, Walsh was established at the Los Angeles Motordrome, where the Aero Club of California had established an aviation camp. Powered by his three-cylinder Elbridge featherweight, Walsh dominated a small field of fellow amateur Southern California aviators in the novice air meet held at the motordrome from 22 to 23 October, winning every event. Prizes included cash and trophies, including the San Diego Cup for highest altitude. The event also earned him notoriety.

Soon afterward, Walsh became aligned with Macomber Aeroplane Engine Company, a local rotary engine manufacturer in Los Angeles, and replaced his Elbridge Featherweight with the first Macomber rotary engine ever built. The engine did not perform well and prevented Walsh from participating in the second Los Angeles Air Meet at Dominguez Field in late December 1910. On February 19, 1911, Walsh took his entire family flying, powered by an improved Macomber engine. Charlie, Alice, Kenneth, and Juanita became the first family to every fly together in an airplane. On March 4, 1911, Harry Harkness contracted Walsh to build an airplane for use by his chief mechanic John Kiley to learn to fly at the Harkness camp at North Island in San Diego, California.

=== Harkness and Walsh Silver Darts ===
Walsh delivered the plane to John Kiley at the Harkness aviation camp at North Island on April 7, 1911. According to at least one source, Walsh added "silver dust" to the unbleached muslin of the flying surfaces. This earned the aircraft the name "Silver Dart". Harkness paid Walsh $5000 for the plane, finally making him solvent. A week later, Walsh crashed his plane at Dominguez Field while attempting to qualify as the Aero Club of California's first licensed aviator. At some point, Walsh built a Silver Dart of his own. There seems to be disagreement as the whether the Walsh Silver Dart was built before or after his crash at Dominguez. Like the Silver Dart he sold to Harry Harkness, his was based on the Curtiss airplane of the day, but with four Farman-type ailerons mounted flush to the end of all four wings replacing the Curtiss-style ailerons normally located between the upper and lower wing. The upper and lower ailerons were connected to each other via a vertical pole and operated in unison. They were moved via wires connected to the pilots steering wheel post. The wings also had about 1/3 more surface area than a Curtiss, spanning 40 feet with a 4.5 foot chord. It measured 37 feet from the tip of the forward elevator to the tail of the rudder. Both the rudder and front elevator were double surfaced, or box-type, with the rudder being enclosed by a pair of two foot square vertical wings on either side of the horizontal surface. There was no elevator function to the tail. The tail and elevator surfaces measured approximately two feet by six feet and were set much farther out from the wings than a normal Curtiss. Unlike the Harkness airplane, however, this Silver Dart was powered by the first production 40 hp, four-cylinder Hall-Scott engine which turned an eight-foot propeller.

== Exhibition aviator ==
=== Pacific Aviation Company ===
Walsh began his career as a professional exhibition aviator with the Pacific Aviation Company, owned by the Manning Brothers of Portland, Oregon. His first event was May 11–12, 1911 in Roseburg, Oregon. He kept a very busy schedule throughout the Pacific Northwest and endured some close calls and crashes. At his event at Laramie, Wyoming, on July 31, he set a record for the highest elevation at which airplane flight was ever successfully conducted in the United States (7200 feet). While Alice Walsh would later recall that Charles had his Silver Dart stolen at Kearney, Nebraska, about a week later by the Manning Brothers, this account is disputed by local newspapers. His airplane was reportedly almost completely destroyed when he hit a tree during his exhibition there on August 4.

Following that, on August 12, Charles Walsh landed in a cornfield while performing an exhibition at Fremont, Nebraska. The locals were very upset by what they considered a poor showing by Walsh. The farmer who owned the field sued the Pacific Aviation Company a few days later for $100 in damages to his crops and a local judge confiscated the airplane pending a settlement. This was perhaps the first such lawsuit of its kind. On August 24, the Pacific Aviation Company settled a suit brought by the local aviation committee of Fremont for $300. Walsh then sued the Pacific Aviation Company for $56.25 that he felt was owed to him as his share of ticket sales for the event. This resulted in an attachment (law) being executed against the airplane. Walsh and Manning then had an altercation in front of the Terry Hotel in Fremont that night over Manning deducting airplane repair costs from his share of ticket sales. This was something Walsh claimed clearly violated his contract. According to the local newspaper covering the event, Walsh did not own any interest in the plane.

=== Curtiss Exhibition Company ===
Following the 1911 Chicago International Aviation Meet, Walsh became a contract demonstration pilot with the Curtiss Exhibition Company. On August 31, 1911, he reportedly flew his newly assigned 75 hp Curtiss pusher for the first time at Sterling, Illinois, without incident, followed by an event in Iowa. Walsh then returned to Nebraska, performing aerial demonstrations until the first week of October. On October 12, crowds gathered at Traction Park in Albuquerque, New Mexico, to watch Walsh become the first pilot to fly over the Rio Grande Valley. The Albuquerque International Sunport has a 1914 Curtiss-style pusher representative of the one flown by Walsh on display in the terminal which helps commemorate the event. He continued on a very busy schedule for the rest of the year.

For Walsh, 1912 began by making flights over Havana, Cuba, on New Years Day. His demonstration flights in that city included flying the first woman passenger in Cuba. He spent the rest of January on a very busy tour throughout Texas. His flying soon became influenced by Lincoln Beachy. He crashed and died on October 3, 1912, in Trenton, New Jersey, and was buried in Calvary Cemetery, San Diego.
