= Charles P. Noell =

American politician (1812–1887)

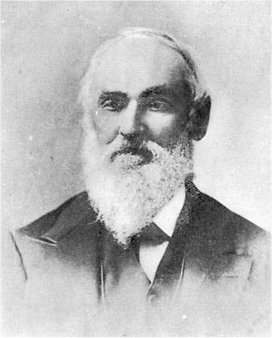
- Charles P. Noell in the mid-1800s
- Born: Charles Price Noell; February 20, 1812; Bedford County, Virginia
- Died: December 30, 1887 (aged 75); San Diego, California
- Occupations: Politician, Merchant
- Years active: 1848–1887

President of the Board of Trustees (informally "Mayor" of San Diego)
- Incumbent
- Assumed office 1852

Charles P. Noell (1812–1887) San Diego Democratic politician.

Charles P. Noell was born in Bedford County, Virginia, February 20, 1812. He came to California in November 1848 and was a San Francisco merchant, but lost all in a fire in 1850. He moved to San Diego in 1850 and built a store, the first wooden building in the city.

Noell served as one of the city's first council man in 1850. While councilman he tried to prevent looting of the city treasury, with limited success. The city went bankrupt and control went to the State of California. He was appointed president for the San Diego city board of trustees (informally called "mayor") during 1852, after the elected city government was abolished during bankruptcy. Noell served in the California State Assembly in 1854.

Noell never married and died December 30, 1887. His tombstone reads:

An Honest Man is the Noblest Work of God

== See also ==
- Biography in William E. Smythe's History of San Diego (1907), part 2 chapter 12.

Preceded by —	President of the Board of Trustees of San Diego; 1852	Succeeded by James W. Robinson
