= Rose Creek (San Diego, California) =

Stream in San Diego, California, United States

Rose Creek is an urban stream in San Diego, California, that drains to Mission Bay. It flows in a north-to-south direction through Rose Canyon and San Clemente Canyon and their tributary canyons. Both Rose Creek and Rose Canyon are named for San Diego pioneer Louis Rose, who had a ranch in the canyon in the 1850s.

The Rose Creek watershed comprises approximately 36 square miles (93 km^{2}). On both sides of the creek in San Clemente Canyon there is a 467-acre (189 ha) city natural park called Marion Bear Park. The wetland where the creek historically entered Mission Bay is known as the Kendall Frost Marsh and is studied and managed by the University of California, San Diego. However, Rose Creek was diverted and channelized in the first half of the 20th century and now enters Mission Bay through an artificial channel further east.

The Rose Creek Watershed Alliance was created in 2005 to create a plan to improve the watershed. The plan was accepted by the City of San Diego in 2008. A volunteer group called the Friends of Rose Creek conducts periodic cleanups. The city has applied for a permit to clear vegetation from the lower creek channel in an effort to prevent flooding.
