= Rancho Santa Maria de Los Peñasquitos =

Historic ranch in San Diego, California

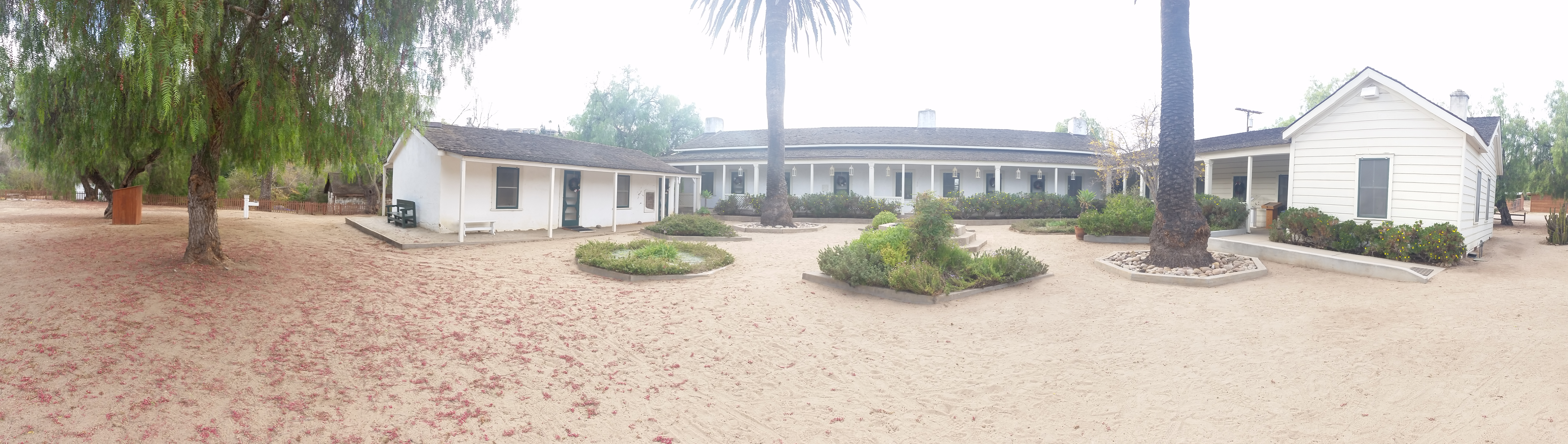
- Johnson-Taylor Adobe in 2017

General information
- Coordinates: 32.938°N 117.127°W
- Construction started: 1824

Rancho Santa Maria de Los Peñasquitos was a 8,486-acre (34.34 km^{2}) Mexican land grant in present-day southwestern San Diego County, California, given in 1823 to Francisco María Ruiz. The name means "Saint Mary of the Little Cliffs". It encompassed the present-day communities of Mira Mesa, Carmel Valley, and Rancho Peñasquitos in northern San Diego, and was inland from the Torrey Pines State Natural Preserve bluffs.

== History ==
The Rancho Santa Maria de los Peñasquitos was the first Mexican land grant in present-day San Diego County. Ruiz built an adobe home on the rancho, which was north of the Presidio and Mission San Diego de Alcalá, and nearby the Kumeyaay settlement of Awil Nyawa. Ruiz built the first ranch house on the rancho in 1824, which was later expanded upon.

In 1837 Ruiz sold his ranch to Francisco María Alvarado - a grandnephew. After Ruiz died in 1839, Alvarado moved to the ranch, and lived in the adobe home built by Ruiz. Alvarado married Tomasa Pico (1801 - 1876), and they gave the property to their daughter Maria Estéfana Alvarado (1840 - 1926) when she married Captain George Alonzo Johnson (1823 - 1903) in 1859.

With the cession of California to the United States following the Mexican-American War, the 1848 Treaty of Guadalupe Hidalgo provided that the land grants would be honored. As required by the Land Act of 1851, a claim for Rancho Los Peñasquitos was filed with the Public Land Commission in 1852, Capt. Johnson inherited the ranch by the time the U.S. government granted a patent to the land in 1876.

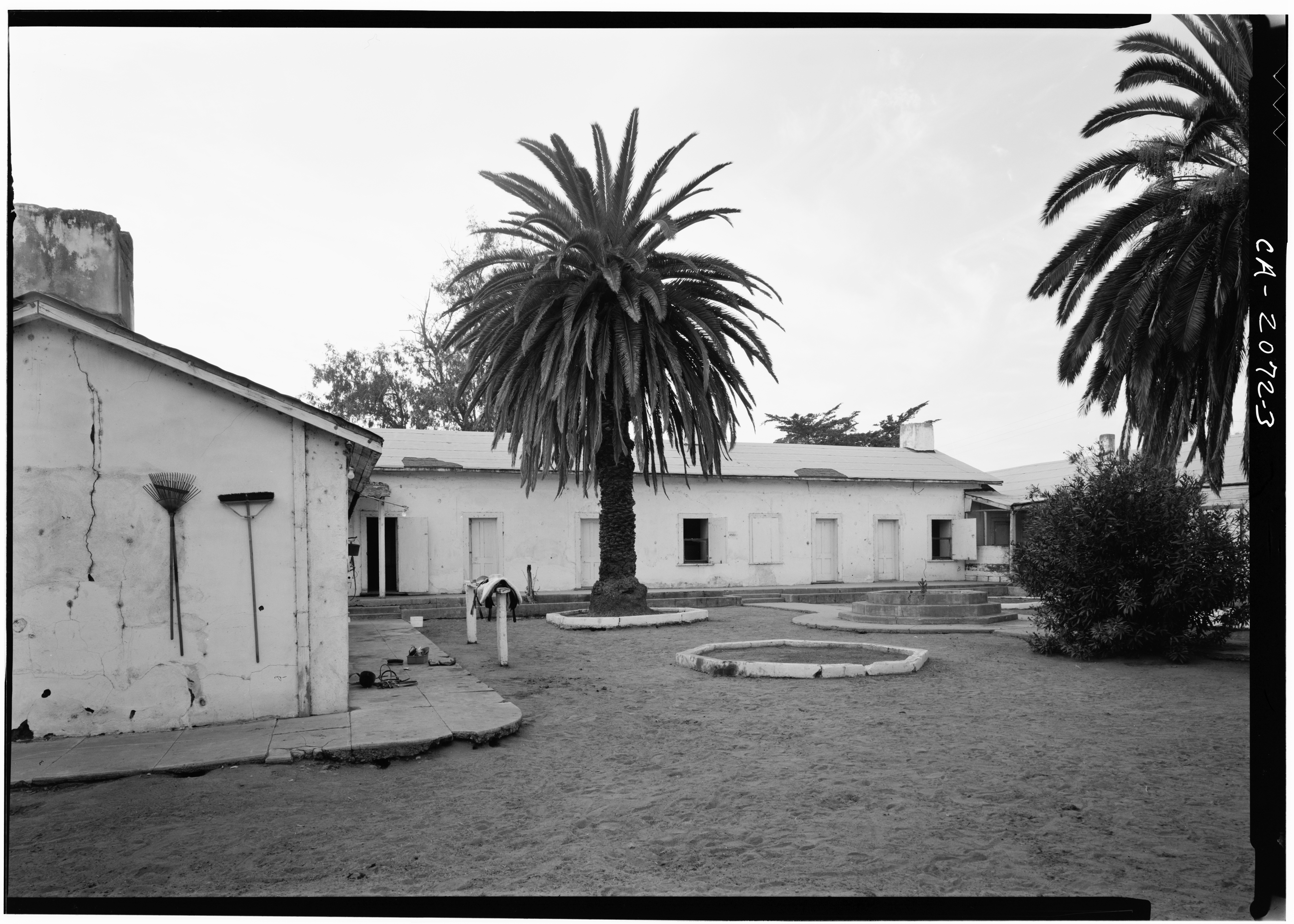
A view of the courtyard at the Johnson-Taylor Ranch House, in about 1933.

The rancho was also a way station on the wagon road to Warner's Ranch from San Diego via San Pasqual and Santa Ysabel Asistencia, from the 1840s. From 1857 to 1860 the rancho was a way station on that road for the coaches of the San Antonio-San Diego Mail Line on the 125 mile route between San Diego and Carrizo Creek Station via the Warner's Ranch road, and the Southern Emigrant Trail. Passengers were given meals here, served by the lady of the house. Rancho Peñasquitos was 20 miles from San Diego and 16 miles from the next station at San Pasqual.

Capt. Johnson sold the rancho in 1880 to Colonel Jacob Shell Taylor, founder of Del Mar. Charles F. Mohnike owned the ranch in 1910. In 1921 George Sawday and Oliver Sexon bought the ranch and stocked it with cattle. Real estate developer Irvin J. Kahn bought Rancho Peñasquitos in 1962.

== Historic sites of the Rancho ==
Rancho de Los Peñasquitos (Little Cliffs Ranch) is a historic 1823 adobe ranch home located in the Los Peñasquitos Canyon Preserve in San Diego, California. The San Diego County Parks & Recreation department offers tours on weekends. The area has archaeological sites, with artifacts found showing indigenous people living here for over six thousand years.

== Natural history ==
The Los Peñasquitos Canyon Preserve park also preserves habitat on the former rancho lands for more than 500 plant species, with many being rare or endemic native plants in the coastal sage scrub ecosystem. This locale was known to be quite wooded with riparian forests and oak woodlands as late as the 1880s, at which time California state survey recommended preservation of the locale's trees and woodland plant communities to prevent further erosion and subsequent flooding, which had already occurred from areas of prior deforestation. Additional present-day park land acquisition and plant restoration is ongoing. A tree endemic to only this area is the Torrey Pine, the rarest native pine in the United States and an endangered species surviving in a single mainland population within Torrey Pines State Natural Reserve and the adjacent coastal strip.

== See also ==
- California coastal sage and chaparral ecoregion
- List of Ranchos of California
- National Register of Historic Places listings in San Diego County, California
- Ranchos of California
