= Julian Ames =

American politician (1807–1866)

Jesse Wilbur Ames
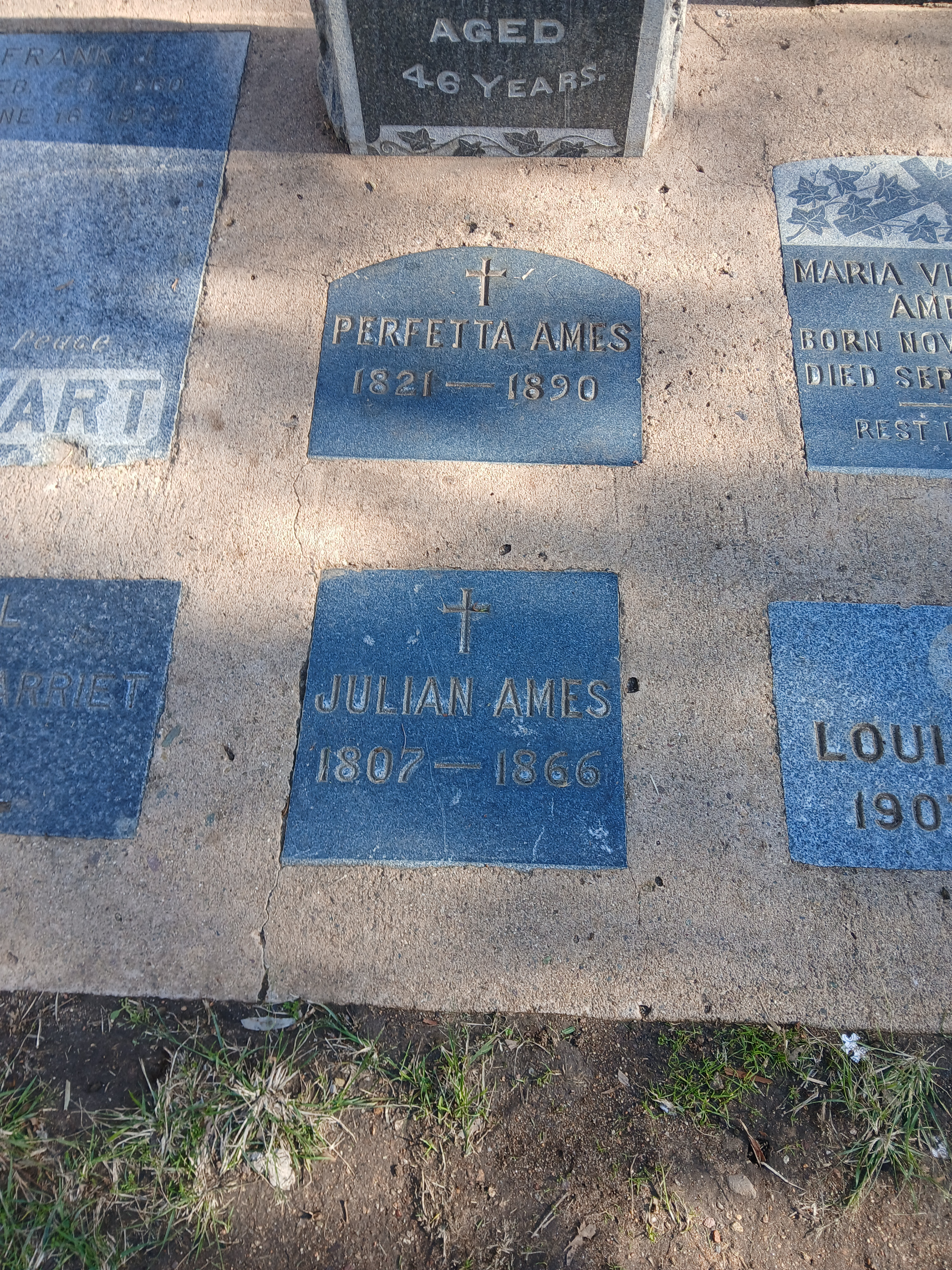
- Julian Ames's headstone at Pioneer Park.
- Born: Jesse Julian Ames; 1807; Amesbury, Massachusetts, U.S.
- Died: February 1, 1866 (aged 59)
- Burial place: Calvary Cemetery, San Diego
- Occupations: Sailor, Pioneer
- Spouse: Perfecta Espiñosa
- Children: Matilda ("Mary"), Nievas, Francisco ("Frank"), Samuel, Daniel, José

President of the Board of Trustees of San Diego
- In office 1853–1855

Jesse Wilbur Ames (1807 – February 1866), also known as Juliano Ames, was a San Diego pioneer. He was born in Amesbury, Massachusetts but arrived as a sailor in San Diego in 1820, from Plainfield, Connecticut.

Captain Ames was baptized into the Catholic faith as Jesse Julian Ames, which allowed him to own property and other rights. He married Perfecta Espiñosa in 1838 at Mission San Diego de Alcala. She was born 1821 in La Paz, Baja California, Mexico, the daughter of Pusamino Espiñosa, an officer in the Spanish Army and commander at La Paz who went to San Diego in 1820.

They had daughters, Matilda ("Mary") and Nievas, and sons Francisco ("Frank"), Samuel, Daniel, and José.

In 1846, when the Mexican–American War broke out, he was on an otter hunting expedition on the Baja California coast, with Philip Crosthwaite, John Post, John C. Stewart, and William Curley.

Learning of the war at the Misión Nuestra Señora del Santísimo Rosario de Viñacado near El Rosario, Baja California, they all returned to San Diego and served in the Battle of San Pasqual.

They reached the town late at night, and were wakened by a loud knock on the door early in the morning.

It was Captain Gillespie, who said: "There can be no neutrals in this country; you must either enlist for three months (as the war will probably be over by that time), or be imprisoned on the Congress."

Ames volunteered in the war.

Ames was president of the board of trustees for San Diego during 1853–1855, when the city had no mayoral form of government.

Captain Ames bought Rancho Cañada de los Coches in 1859 from the Catholic Church, which served as a stop for the San Antonio–San Diego mail, nicknamed the "Jackass Mail". The ranch was located about 25 miles east of San Diego. Ames planted a double cactus hedge around the ranch house and raised sheep and cattle. Later, he built one of the first grist (flour) mills in the county and built a dam to supply his ranch with reliable water. Ames also made the best soap south of Los Angeles, opened a blacksmith shop, and made lime for whitewash. At his ranch, Ames would throw lavish fiestas that drew guests as far away as Santa Barbara and Los Angeles.

Ames's adobe home was destroyed in the 1880s by vandals who thought valuables were hidden in it. The ruins were removed around 1925.

Ames died in 1866 while getting his wagon out of the mud. He is buried in the Calvary Cemetery, now Calvary Memorial Pioneer Park in Mission Hills. His wife Perfecta died 1890 and also is buried there.

Preceded by Louis Rose	President of the San Diego Board of Trustees; 1855–1856	Succeeded by Thomas Collins
