= List of pre-statehood mayors of San Diego =

This is a list of pre-statehood alcaldes and mayors of San Diego, from 1770 to 1850, during the Spanish, Mexican, and early American periods, prior to California's admission to statehood.

== Commandants of the Presidio of San Diego ==
From 1770 San Diego was ruled by a commandant from the Presidio of San Diego under the Spanish and (from 1822) Mexican governments. When San Diego became a Pueblo in 1835, an alcalde (mayor) of San Diego served under the Mexican and pre-statehood United States governments.

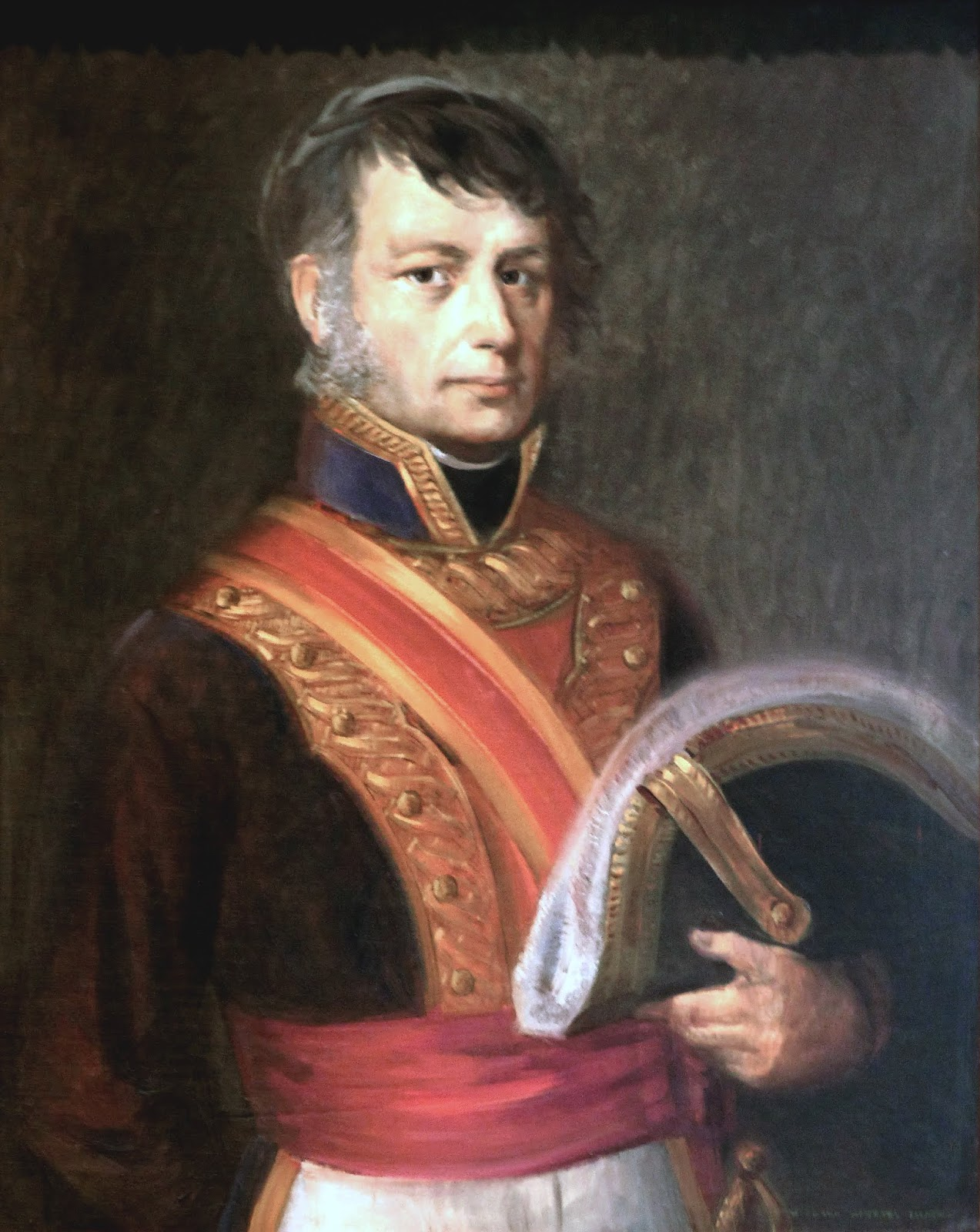
José María Estudillo served twice as Commandant of the Presidio of San Diego, from 1820 to 1821 and 1827 to 1830.

| Commandant | Term | Notes |
|---|---|---|
| Lt. Pedro Fages | July 1770 – May 1774 | Military Commandant of California |
| Lt. José Francisco Ortega | 1773–1781 | Acting Commandant from July 1771 |
| Lt. José de Züñiga | September 8, 1781 – October 19, 1793 | |
| Lt. Antonio Grajera | October 19, 1793 – August 23, 1799 | |
| Lt. José Front | August 23, 1799 – 1803 | Temporary Commandant ranking Rodriguez |
| Lt. Manuel Rodríguez | August 23, 1799 – late 1806 | Acting Commandant to 1803 |
| Lt. Francisco María Ruiz | late 1806 – 1807 | 1st time; Acting Commandant. |
| Lt. José de la Guerra y Noriega | 1806–1807 | "for a short time" |
| Capt. José Raimundo Carrillo | late 1807 – 1809 | |
| Lt. Francisco María Ruiz | 1809–1820 | 1st time; Acting Commandant. |
| Capt. Ignacio de Corral | 1810–1820 | Never came to California |
| Lt. José María Estudillo | October 23, 1820 – September 1821 | 1st time |
| Capt. Francisco María Ruiz | September 1821 – 1827 | 2nd time; Presidio relinquished by the Spanish April 20, 1822 |
| Lt. José María Estudillo | 1827 – April 8, 1830 | 2nd time |
| Lt. Santiago Argüello | April 8, 1830 – 1835 | |
| Capt. Agustín V. Zamorano | 1835–1840 | Never assumed command; was in San Diego only during 1837–1838 |
| Capt. Pablo de la Portillà | 1835–1838 | Nominally commandant by rank whenever present |

== Alcaldes of the Pueblo of San Diego ==
San Diego became a pueblo in 1834, after a petition to Governor José Figueroa endorsed by Commandant Santiago Arguello. The first Alcalde (mayor) Juan María Osuna was elected, defeating Pío Pico by 13 votes. By 1838, the population shrank enough to lose its pueblo status and was ruled by a Juez de Paz as a partition of the Los Angeles District until San Diego was incorporated as a city under U.S. rule.

The following are the Jueces de Paz and Alcaldes (Justices of the Peace and Mayors) of San Diego. In this table "suplente" means substitute.

| Alcalde | Term | Notes |
|---|---|---|
| Juan María Osuna | January 1, 1835 – 1836 | 1st time |
| Santiago Argüello | 1836–1837 | Also last full-time Commandant |
| José Antonio Estudillo | 1837–1839 | 1st time |
| Juan María Marrón | 1839–1841 | 1st time |
| Rosario E. Aguilar | 1841 | Juez de Paz |
| Jesús Moreno | 1841 | Suplente |
| José Antonio Congora | 1842 | Juez de Paz; 1st time |
| José María Alvarado | 1842 | Suplente |
| José Joaquin Ortega | 1843 – May 1843 | Juez de Paz; 1st time |
| José Antonio Congora | May 1843 – 1843 | Juez de Paz; 2nd time |
| José María Orozco | 1843 | Suplente |
| Juan María Marrón | 1844 | Juez de Paz; 2nd time; b. February 8, 1808 |
| Thomas Wrightington | 1844 | Suplente; 1st time |
| Francisco María Alvarado | 1845 | Juez de Paz |
| José Antonio Estudillo | 1845 | Juez de Paz (temporary); 2nd time |
| José Ramon Argüello | 1845 – April 1845 | Suplente |
| José Antonio Estudillo | April 1846 – 1846 | Sub-prefect; 3rd time; served until arrival of Americans |
| Juan María Osuna | 1846 | Juez de Paz; 2nd time(?); at first declined office, possibly did not act |
| Miguel Pedrorena | 1846 | Juez de Paz; served in Estudillo's absence |
| José Joaquin Ortega | August 1846 – August 1846 | Juez de Paz; 2nd time; 1st under American rule |
| Henry D. Fitch | August 1846 – June 1847 | Suplente; Juez de Paz in 1847 |
| Lt. Robert Clift, Jr. | June 1847 – 1847 | Suplente; also Juez de Paz to March 1848 |
| Philip Crosthwaite | 1847 | Suplente; possibly appointed with Fitch |
| Thomas Wrightington | 1847 – March 1848 | Suplente; 2nd time; possibly served in Crosthwaite's place |
| Juan Bandini | March 29, 1848 – September 27, 1848 | Juez de Paz |
| E. L. Brown | April 15, 1848 – 1848 | |
| Juan María Marrón | October 3, 1848 – 1849 | Juez de Paz |
| Dennis Gahagan | 1849–1850 | Alcalde |
| Thomas W. Sutherland | March 1850 – 1850 | Acting Alcalde |

== See also ==
- Mayor of San Diego
- List of pre-statehood mayors of Los Angeles
- List of pre-statehood mayors of San Francisco
- List of pre-statehood mayors of San Jose
