= Louis Rose =

American politician (1807–1888)

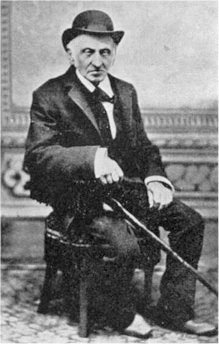
- Born: March 24, 1807; Neuhaus-an-der-Oste, Kingdom of Westphalia
- Died: February 14, 1888 (aged 80); San Diego, California

Louis Rose (March 24, 1807 – February 14, 1888) was a pioneer developer of San Diego, California. The neighborhood of Roseville in Point Loma is named for him, as are Rose Creek and Rose Canyon.

== Biography ==
Rose was a German Jewish immigrant and San Diego's first identifiable Jewish resident. He came to San Diego in 1850, via New Orleans, Louisiana and Texas. He traveled to California with Judge James W. Robinson's wagon train party. Arriving just as California became a state in 1850, he was a member of the first grand jury and first County Board of Supervisors. He was president of the board of trustees for San Diego during 1853–1855, and served on the San Diego school board. Rose was a volunteer in the Garra Indian uprising.

Rose was central in the establishment and development of San Diego's Jewish community. High Holy Day services were held in his house. The Hebrew Benevolent Society was formed at his house. He donated the land for the first Jewish cemetery. Though a layman, he officiated for the community at a Jewish wedding. Rose was a founding member of Congregation Beth Israel (San Diego). Congregation Beth Israel became Temple Beth Israel, San Diego's largest synagogue.

Rose married twice. His first marriage was to Carolyn Marx in New Orleans. The marriage ended in divorce. Later in his life, in San Diego, Rose was introduced to and married a local Jewish widow, Matilda Newman. They had two children. One child died in infancy. Their second child, Henrietta Rose, became a schoolteacher in San Diego. She never married. She was buried in an unmarked grave until the Louis Rose Society for the Preservation of Jewish History purchased a headstone, which was dedicated in partnership with the school district, the teachers union, and the Eastern Star Masonic Organization, for which she was a lodge president.

Louis Rose was buried in the Jewish cemetery that he helped found. As San Diego developed, the old Jewish cemetery was sold and the bodies buried there were moved to a newer Jewish cemetery, the Home of Peace. In the process, Rose's original headstone was lost; later one was put in by people who knew him only by historical reputation and wished to honor his memory. The exact location of his interment is uncertain.

== San Diego contributions ==
Rose realized that transportation would be important to San Diego. With his associate James W. Robinson, Rose founded the San Diego and Gila Railroad in 1855 and served as its treasurer. The railroad was never built.

In 1866 Rose bought land and laid out a town he called "Roseville" adjacent to San Diego Bay on the Point Loma peninsula. He laid out streets and built a wharf. He thought it would be a future city, and for a time it was a separate city competing with San Diego's New Town (now downtown San Diego) across the bay. He hoped to link Roseville to a railroad. Many were skeptical about the prospects for Roseville or San Diego, but he would always say "Just wait a while and you will see." Roseville eventually became part of the city of San Diego. A plaque at the corner of Rosecrans Street and Avenida de Portugal (which was the intersection of First and Main Streets when Roseville was an independent city) recognizes the establishment of Roseville in 1869.

Rose was postmaster at Old Town, San Diego during 1873–1883. This was an honor, considering that he was appointed by Republican presidents even though Rose himself was a lifelong Democrat.

Rose Creek and Rose Canyon in San Diego are named for him. He bought 650 acres (260 ha) in the canyon in 1853 and had a ranch there, with a tannery. He also prospected for gold and copper without too much success. The tannery provided capital to build a wharf and to lay out Roseville.

Rose died in 1888. He is buried in Home of Peace Cemetery on Imperial Avenue.

== Legacy ==
- In 1934, a monument plaque was placed on U.S. Highway 101 commemorating Rose. Although the highway is now gone, the plaque remains in its original location, which is now on the campus of the University of California, San Diego (in front of the Applied Physics and Mathematics Building). The plaque was placed by the San Diego Historical Society, Congregations Beth Israel and Tifereth Israel, and San Diego Lodge 35 of the Free and Accepted Masons, which Rose helped to found.
- In 2004, Louis Rose Point was dedicated in honor of Rose. It is located at the foot of Womble Street, on the grounds of the old Naval Training Center (now Liberty Station). In 2011, a plaque honoring Rose was dedicated at Louis Rose Point, and two rose bushes were planted in his name.
- The Louis Rose Society for the Preservation of Jewish History is named for him.
- A Point Loma elementary school, Cabrillo Elementary, established a sister-school relationship with an elementary school in Neuhaus-an-der-Oste, Germany, where Rose was born.

== See also ==
- Louis Rose: San Diego's First Jewish Settler and Entrepreneur by Donald H. Harrison (2004). ISBN 0-932653-68-5
- Biography (San Diego Historical Society) from Smythe's History of San Diego, pp. 285–286
- Heilbron, Carl (1936). History of San Diego County. San Diego Press Club. Biography, p. 210
- Louis Rose Society for the Preservation of Jewish History

| Preceded by James W. Robinson | President of the San Diego Board of Trustees; 1853–1855 | Succeeded by Julian Ames |
