= Francisco María Ruiz =

American politician (1754–1839)

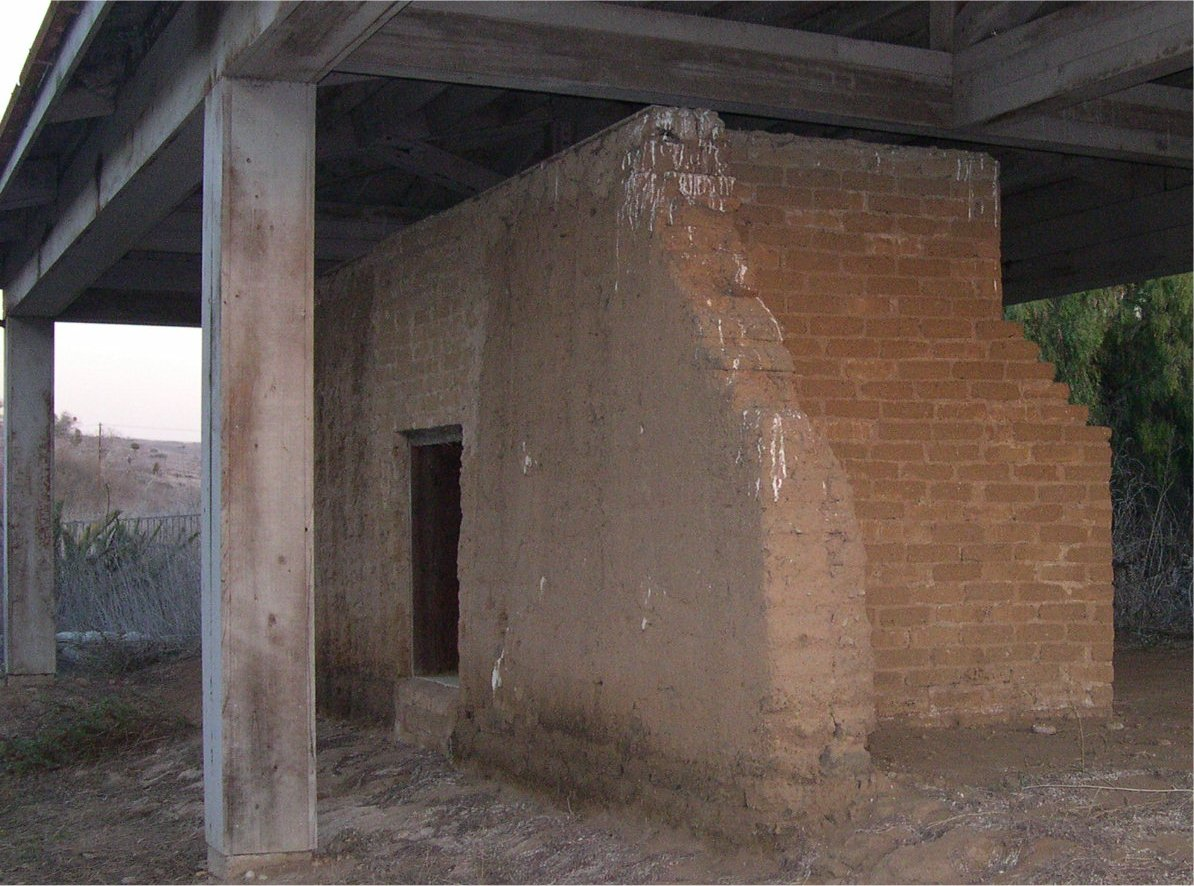
- Ruins of Ruiz-Alvarado adobe, built 1824
- Born: 1754; Loreto, Baja California Sur
- Died: 1839 (aged 84–85)
- Occupations: Military officer, early settler
- Years active: 1780s–1827
- Known for: Commandant of Presidio of San Diego; first private land grant in San Diego County (Rancho Los Peñasquitos)

Francisco María Ruiz (1754–1839) was an early settler of San Diego, California.

== Biography ==
Ruiz was born 1754 in Loreto, Baja California Sur. He enlisted in the army when he was 26 and sent to Upper California. He was promoted from sergeant to lieutenant in 1805 in Santa Barbara and transferred to San Diego.

Lieutenant Ruiz was acting commandant of the Presidio of San Diego during 1809–1820 then captain and commandant during September 1821–1827. During this time, the Presidio was relinquished by the Spanish on April 20, 1822. Captain Ruiz retired in 1827 at the age of 73.

In 1823, Captain Ruiz received the first private land grant in present San Diego County, the 8,486-acre (34.34 km^{2}) Rancho Los Peñasquitos (Little Cliffs Ranch). This area is still known as Rancho Peñasquitos. Ruiz built an adobe home in the western part of the Ranch, at the eastern end of Sorrento Valley. Some walls of the adobe still stand, and are protected with a shed roof. He kept his home in San Diego and only occasionally visited his ranch. In 1837 Ruiz sold his ranch to his great nephew Francisco María Alvarado who cared for him in his old age.

Ruiz never married, and died in 1839.

== See also ==
- María Ygnacia López de Carrillo
