= Francisco María Alvarado =

Early settler of San Diego, California (1794–1860)

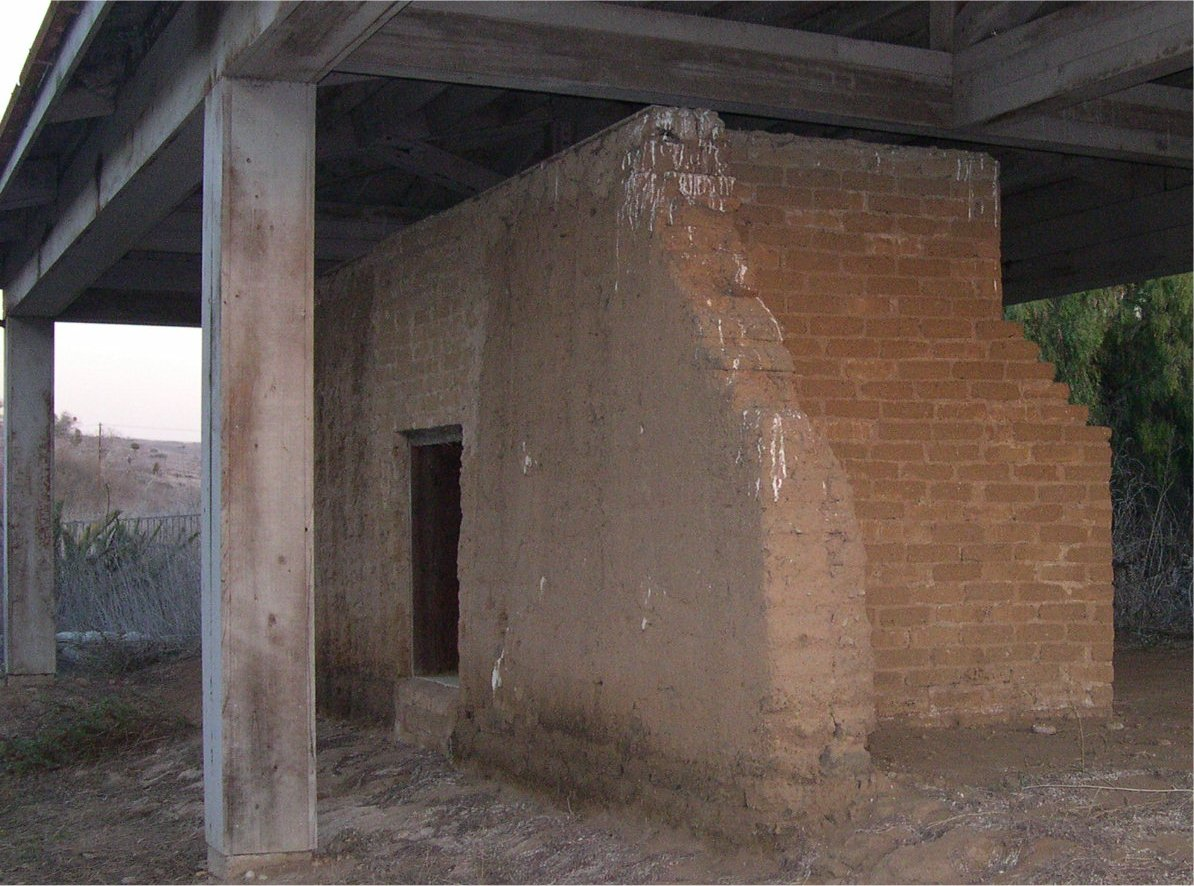
- The Ruiz-Alvarado adobe, built 1824 at Rancho Los Peñasquitos, is now protected under a wooden shelter
- Born: January 19, 1794; Spain
- Died: November 8, 1860 (aged 66); Rancho Los Peñasquitos, California
- Occupations: Early settler, Regidor, Juez de Paz (Mayor), Rancher
- Known for: Early settler of San Diego, Pueblo San Diego government involvement, Rancho Los Peñasquitos
- Spouse: Tomasa Pico
- Children: Tomasa Alvarado

Juez de Paz (Justice of the Peace, or Mayor) of San Diego
- Incumbent
- Assumed office 1845

Francisco María Alvarado (born 1/19/1794 - 11/8/1860) was an early settler of San Diego, California.

Alvarado was born around 1793 to a Spanish soldier. He married Tomasa Pico, the sister of Pío Pico, the last Mexican governor of Alta California.

In 1833, with five other male citizens, Alvarado urged the governor to establish a pueblo (town) government for Pueblo San Diego to replace 60-some years of military rule. Alvarado was active in San Diego Pueblo government. Between 1837 and 1845 he was regidor (councilman), treasurer 1840–41, and in 1845, juez de paz (justice of the peace, or mayor).

In 1837, Alvarado bought Rancho Los Peñasquitos (Little Cliffs Ranch) from Captain Francisco María Ruiz, who received it as a Mexican land grant in 1823. In exchange, Alvarado cared for Ruiz in his old age. This area is still known as Peñasquitos.

After Ruiz died in 1839, Alvarado moved from Old Town San Diego to his beloved ranch. He lived in an adobe home built by Ruiz in the western part of the ranch. Some walls of the adobe still stand, and are protected with a shed roof.

Due to $420 in unpaid debt, Pío Pico bought the ranch. Pico was twice governor of Alta California and relative of Alvarado, and returned the ranch to Alvarado.

Alvarado married Tomasa Pico (1801–1876). Their daughter, also named Tomasa, married Captain George A. Johnson, who inherited the ranch by the time the U.S. government granted a patent to the land in 1876.
