= Peter C. Shannon =

American judge (1821–1899)

- Born: 1821
- Died: April 13, 1899 (aged 77–78); San Diego, California
- Burial place: Calvary Cemetery, San Diego
- Occupations: Lawyer, politician, judge
- Known for: Chief Justice of the Supreme Court of the Dakota Territory

Chief Justice of the Supreme Court of the Dakota Territory
- In office 1873–1877
- Nominated by: President Ulysses S. Grant
- Appointed by: President Ulysses S. Grant

President Judge of local district court
- In office 1852–1853
- Nominated by: Governor William Bigler
- Appointed by: Governor William Bigler

Member of the Pennsylvania House of Representatives
- In office 1862–1863

Peter Chrystostum Shannon (1821 in New Alexandria, Pennsylvania – April 13, 1899 in San Diego, California) was an American lawyer, politician, and judge. After practicing law for a time in Pittsburgh, Pennsylvania, in 1852, Shannon ran unsuccessfully for a seat in the US House of Representatives (as a Democrat), losing by five hundred votes to Whig David Ritchie. Shannon was then appointed president judge of the local district court in 1852 by Pennsylvania Governor William Bigler, but served for only a year, having been defeated for re-election in 1853. At the beginning of the Civil War Shannon became a Republican and was elected to the Pennsylvania House of Representatives, serving two terms, 1862 and 1863. He was commissioned Lieutenant Colonel in a regiment which he helped raise, but resigned to continue his political career. In 1862 he campaigned with Governor Andrew Curtin in his successful re-election bid, and in 1864 was part of Lincoln's re-election campaign in Pennsylvania.

After the Civil War Shannon continued his law practice until he was appointed Chief Justice of the Supreme Court of the Dakota Territory in 1873 by President Ulysses S. Grant. Shannon presided over the trial of Jack McCall for the killing of Wild Bill Hickok which resulted in the Dakota Territory's first legal hanging, and prepared the Criminal Code adopted by the Territorial Legislature in 1875. He was reappointed by President Rutherford B. Hayes, but his application for a third appointment was opposed by the Yankton Bar Association, perhaps in part because he was viewed as a supporter of Governor Nehemiah Ordway. President Chester A. Arthur appointed him to a commission negotiating land sales with the Sioux, which he served on for a number of years. He signed an 1882 agreement with the Lakota which was never ratified.

In 1883 Shannon was appointed to investigate charges of drunkenness and improper behavior against Everton Conger, a judge in Montana Territory; although his report was somewhat sympathetic, it led to Attorney-General Benjamin H. Brewster recommending his removal. Conger was ultimately restored to office by President Arthur, but only one day before the expiration of his commission. Shannon testified before a Congressional committee about his investigation in March 1884.

Shannon moved to California only a year or two before his death, due to ill health, and died after being injured in a carriage accident.

Shannon County, South Dakota was named in his honor until May 1, 2015 when it was renamed Oglala Lakota County.

== Publications ==
In 1883 a series of articles by Shannon in the Dakota Herald was republished as The State of Dakota: How it May Be Formed (Yankton, 1883).
