= Robert Clift Jr. =

American soldier and early settler in California (1824–1859)

Alcalde of San Diego
- In office June 1847 – Late 1847

Sheriff of San Bernardino County
- In office 1853–Unknown

Personal details
- Born: January 4, 1824 Dymock, England
- Died: Near Humboldt River, Nevada, U.S.
- Occupation: Soldier, settler, sheriff, sub-agent
- Known for: Member of the Mormon Battalion; Alcalde of San Diego; first sheriff of San Bernardino County

Military service
- Allegiance: United States
- Service/branch: United States Army
- Years of service: 1846–1848
- Rank: Third Lieutenant
- Unit: Mormon Battalion, Company C

Robert Clift Jr. (January 4, 1824 – October 1859) was an American soldier and early settler in California.

Clift was born in Dymock, England to Robert Sr. and Elizabeth Clift, who would later convert to Mormonism and emigrate to the United States.

He was 3rd Lt. in Company C of the Mormon Battalion. The Battalion marched from Council Bluffs, Iowa to San Diego during the Mexican–American War. The Battalion arrived in San Diego in January 1847 but were too late for the war. They performed community improvement projects that endeared them to the local population, who were initially wary of the Battalion.

When they were about to be discharged in July 1847, the citizens of San Diego signed a petition requesting that they re-enlist for additional duty, and many, including Clift, did.

From June 1847 to March 1848, Clift was Juez de Pas (Justice of the Peace) of San Diego Pueblo. John Vurtinus, in an article, states that Clift:

also served as the Acting Assistant Quartermaster and Commissary Officer with orders to accumulate a full six months' supply of rations. Since his requisitions were never filled completely, stock-piling of rations remained Clift's most persistent problem. Although the San Diego garrison nearly ran out of provisions during October, Clift managed the difficult situation well and generally supplied full rations to the men. Colonel Stevenson thought highly of Robert Clift, calling him the most competent Latter-day Saint officer in the Mormon Volunteers.

The Substitute Alcalde (Suplente), Henry D. Fitch had pressing business in Los Angeles, so he recommended Clift be appointed Substitute Alcade in his place in June 1847, a post he held until later that year. In a letter from California Military Governor Richard B. Mason he writes:

While at San Diego Capt Fitch the Alcalde expressed great anxiety to resign his place if not permanently for a short time that he might go north on business of the utmost importance to himself, he applied to me to sanction his appointment of Lt. Clift of the Mormon Battalion A. Lt. Master & Commissary of that Post as acting Alcalde during his temporary absence; I was well informed that under Mexican laws an Alcalde has the power of appointing a temporary successor under sanction of the Commander of the District. I endorsed my approval upon Clift's appointment being well satisfied that he was a very proper person and a great favorite in the town, and if he should reenter the Service and he can with propriety be appointed Alcalde permanently in the place of Fitch I would respectfully recommend it. From all I can learn the mode of transacting business by the Alcalde here differs materially from those practiced at San Francisco and Monterey—for instance here there are no trials by Jury ...

Using custom duties, Clift received permission from Governor Mason to build a brick building that was used as a courthouse, schoolhouse, and later office for Mayor, City Clerk, and County Board of Supervisors. This was the first fired-brick building in San Diego. The courthouse was reconstructed in 1992 from the ground up and is located in the South corner of the square in Old Town State Park.

In 1851 Clift and about twenty other Mormons bought land and moved near the Cajon Pass, San Bernardino County. When San Bernardino County was organized January 1853, he was elected the first County sheriff. He was Captain of the First Light Dragoons, a militia unit formed in the county in 1856. In 1857 the Mormons were recalled to Utah, due to difficulties with the U.S. Government in Utah, and Clift likely followed.

In 1859 Clift was a sub-agent for the California & Salt Lake Mail Route. He was reportedly killed by Indians near the Humboldt River while scouting a path to connect the older California Trail with the new Simpson's Route across Nevada.
