= Pioneer Park (San Diego) =

Ex-cemetery, now a public park, in San Diego, California, United States

- Mission Hills Park
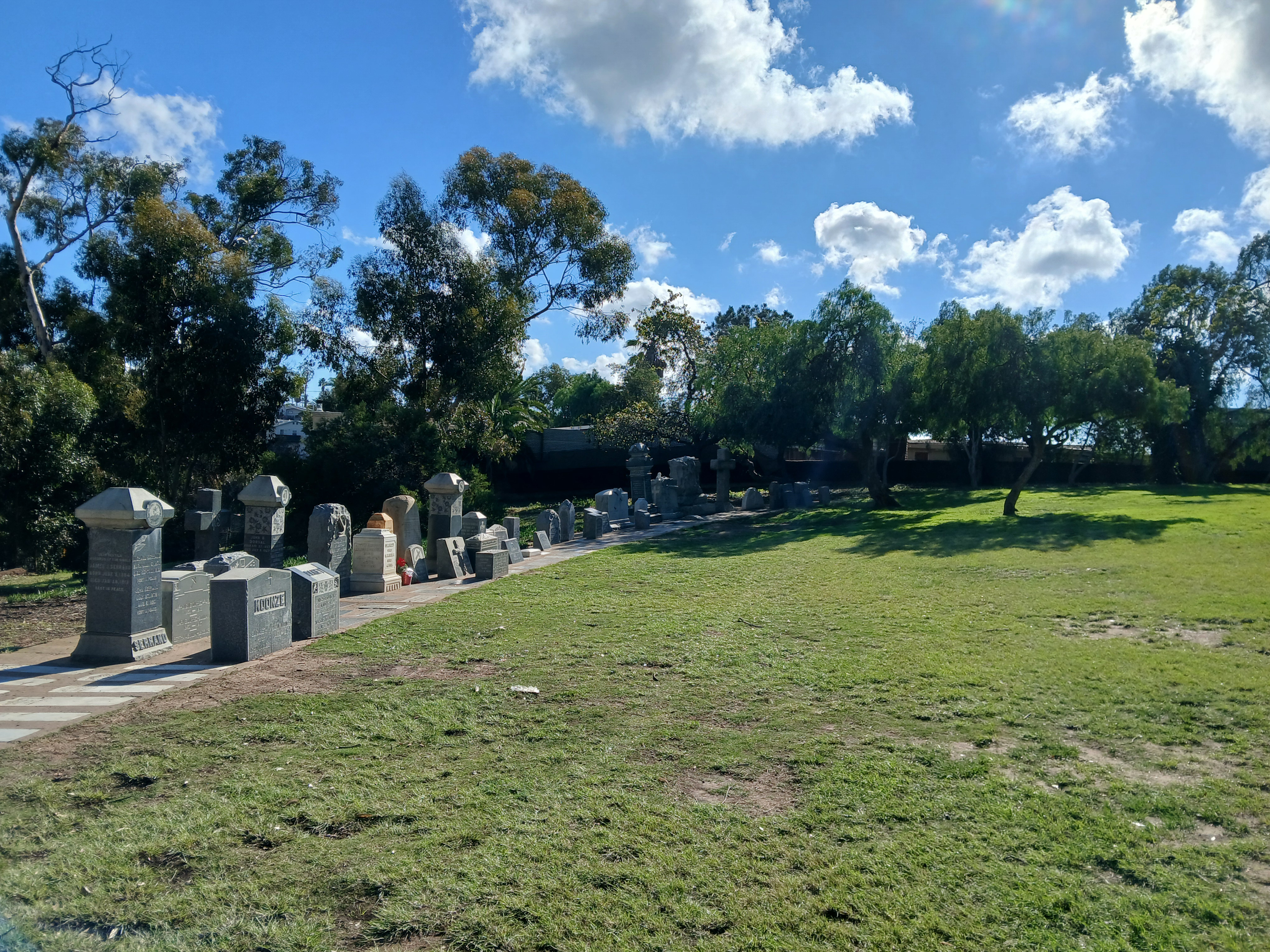
- Location within San Diego County

- Location within San Diego Location within California Location within the United States
- Location: Mission Hills, San Diego, California, United States
- Nearest city: San Diego, California
- Coordinates: 32.7492°N 117.1776°W
- Established: 1876 (as Calvary Cemetery); 1968 (as public park)
- Operator: City of San Diego
- Open: 6 a.m. to dusk
- City: San Diego
- Website: Official website

Pioneer Park, also known as Mission Hills Park, is a public park in the Mission Hills neighborhood of San Diego, California. Originally established in 1876 as Calvary Cemetery, it served as a Catholic burial ground. The cemetery was converted into a park in 1968, with most headstones removed, but over 800 bodies remain buried beneath the grounds.

== History ==
=== Calvary Cemetery ===
Calvary Cemetery was the second Catholic cemetery in San Diego, dating back to when the city had a population of only 250. The first was El Campo Santo cemetery in Old Town. When it began to fill up, the Roman Catholic Diocese of San Diego purchased the land, atop Pringle Hill in the Mission Hills neighborhood, from the city in October 1873. The cemetery was formally established in 1876. For the years when it was in operation, it provided burial grounds primarily for Catholic residents of San Diego.

Following the opening of Holy Cross Cemetery opened in 1919, Calvary Cemetery began to fall into disrepair. In 1939, the caretaker's building, containing many of the burial records, caught on fire. The records were lost. The cemetery remained active until the mid-20th century.

=== Conversion to a park ===
A state law passed in 1957 stated that cemeteries that endangered "the health, safety, comfort, or welfare of the public" and had less than 10 burials in the previous 5 years could be officially abandoned. As the cemetery had not been well-maintained and was frequently visited by vandals and motorcyclists, the city began the process of converting the cemetery into a park in 1961. By 1968, it was fully converted. The City of San Diego removed most of the headstones to Mount Hope Cemetery Despite the removal of most headstones, the remains of the cadavers are still beneath the grounds.

== Features ==
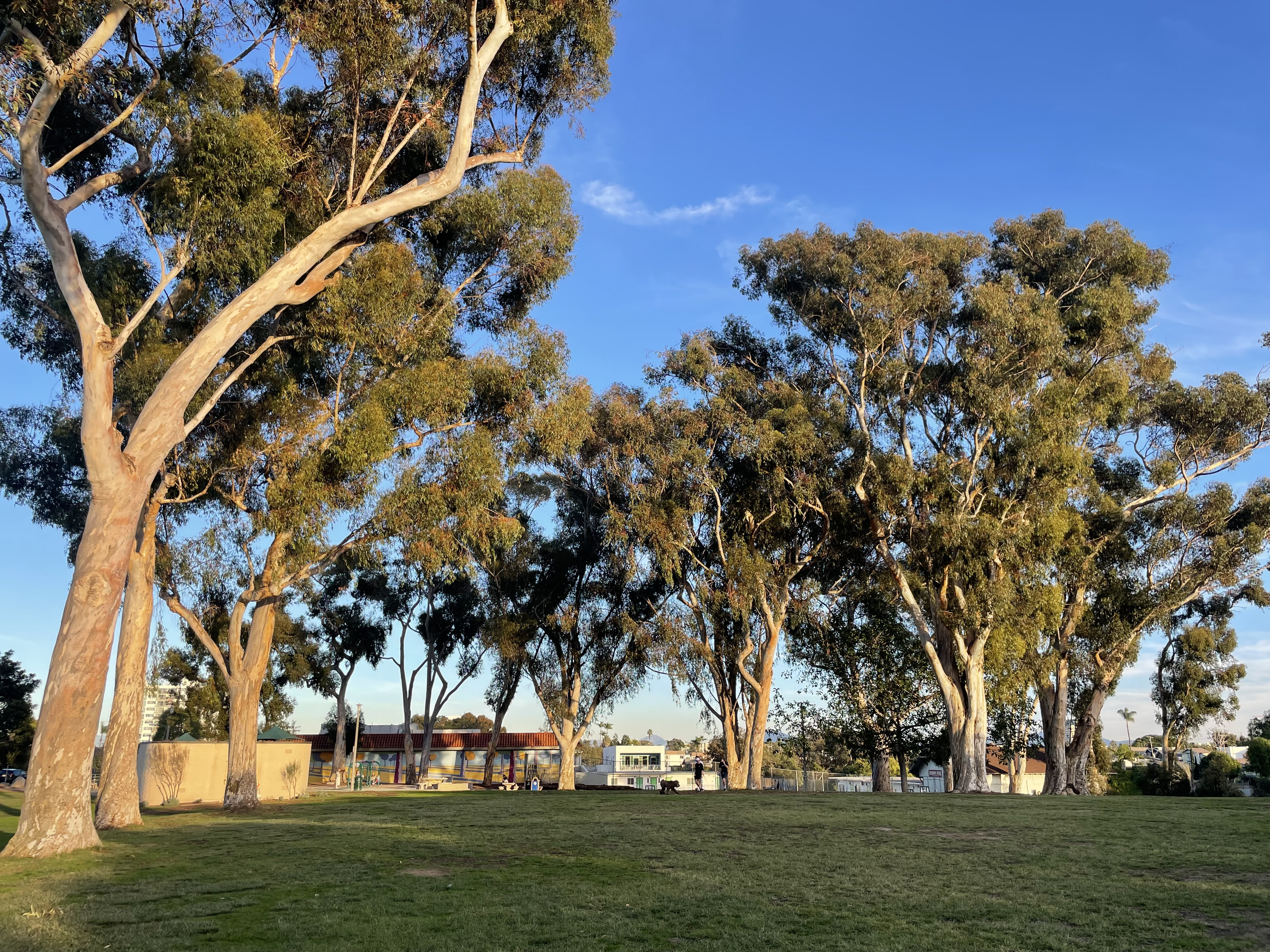
The restrooms are on the left

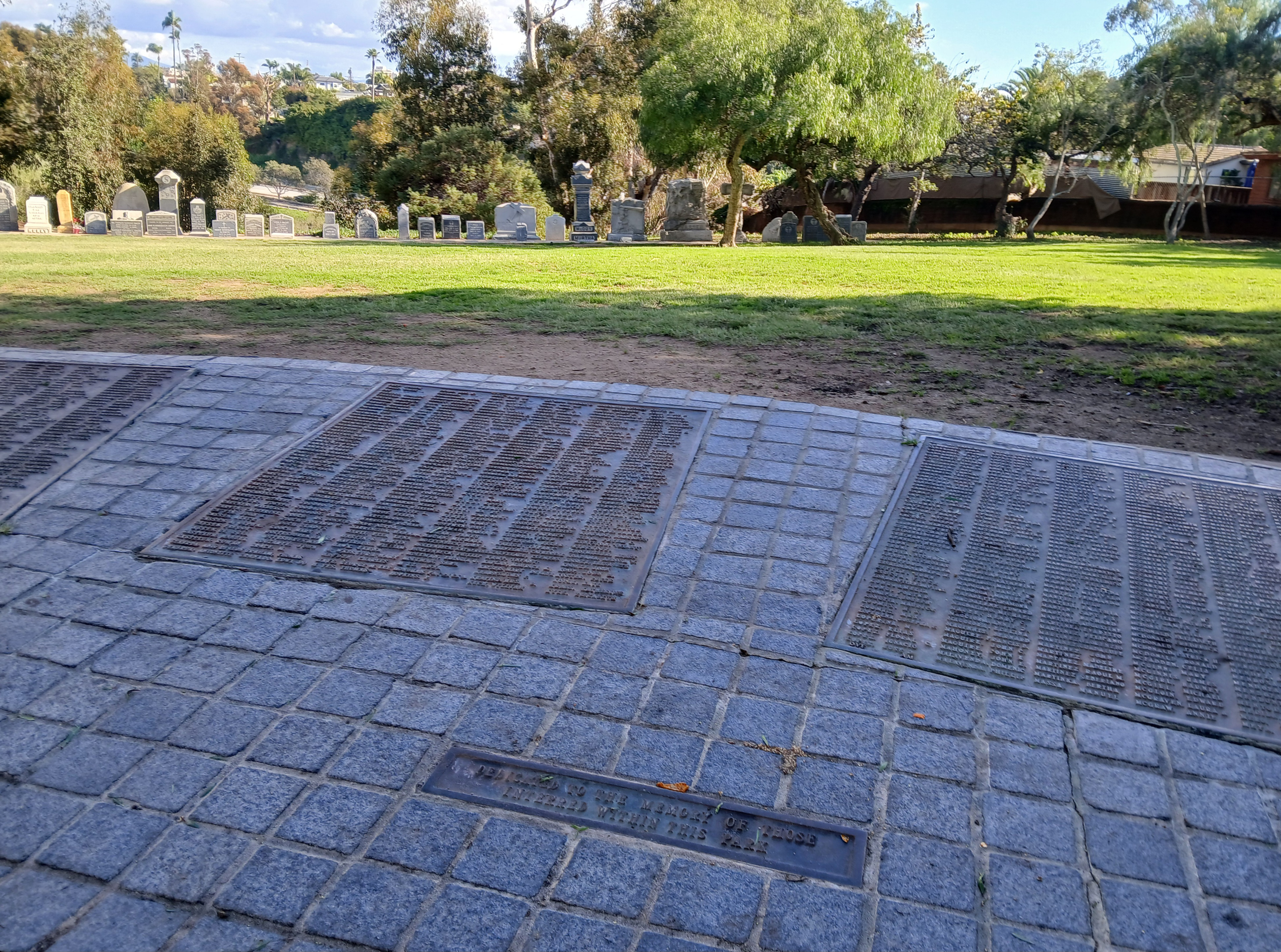
Pioneer Park (San Diego) plaque of the names, of the people that are buried under the park.

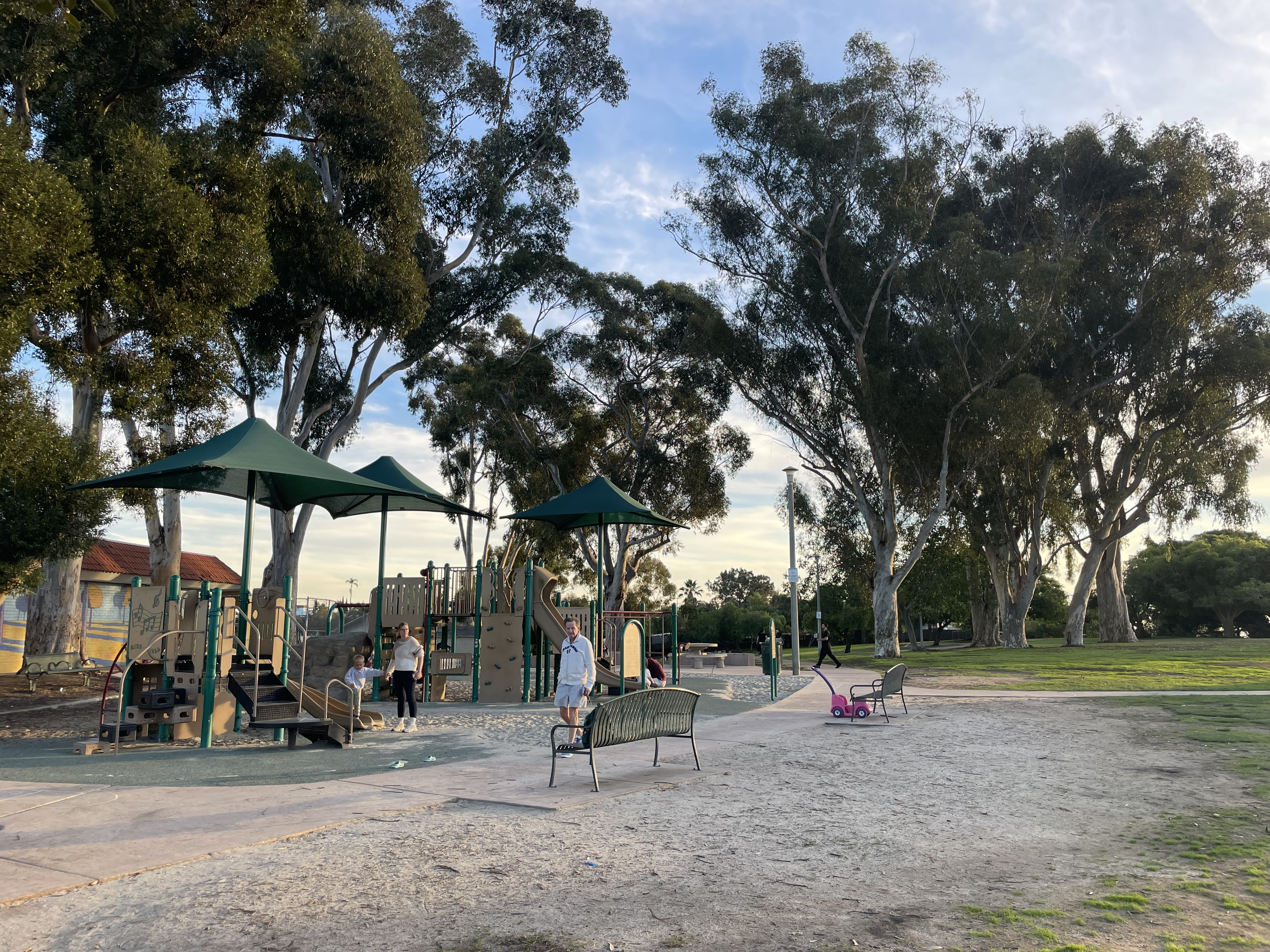
Playground

Features of the park include:

- A memorial row of preserved headstones commemorating the history of what once was a cemetery.
- Children's playground.
- Tennis courts are located across the street from the main park area.

== Notable burials ==
Several prominent individuals and families are interred at the site from its time as Calvary Cemetery. Among them are members of the Bandini family, known for their ownership of the Cosmopolitan Hotel and Restaurant.

Name	Birth Date	Death Date	Notable achievements
Juan Bandini	1800 Lima, Viceroyalty of Peru	November 4, 1859 (aged 58-59)	Married to Maria de los Dolores Estudillo;
Antonio Ubach	September 1835 Barcelona, Spain	May 27, 1907	Also buried at the site is Antonio Ubach, a Roman Catholic priest who served as the parish priest in Old Town San Diego for 23 years beginning in 1860.
Charles Francis Walsh	1877	1912	American pioneer aviator, who built one of California's first airplanes, died in a crash in 1912.
Peter C. Shannon	1821	1899	Peter C. Shannon (1821–1899) was an American judge and politician who served as Chief Justice of the Dakota Territory Supreme Court. He presided over the trial of Jack McCall, leading to the territory's first legal hanging. Shannon died after a carriage accident.
Jesse Wilbur Ames	1807	1866	Jesse Wilbur Ames (1807–1866), a San Diego pioneer, arrived in 1820 as a sailor and later became a Catholic, allowing him to own property. Ames played a role in the Mexican-American War, served as Mayor of San Diego, presidents of the Board of Trustees, and later owned Rancho Cañada de los Coches.
John (Jack) Stewart,		1892	Participated in the Battle of San Pasqual, shipmate to Richard Henry Dana.
Rosa Maria MACHADO de STEWART	1825	1898	Wife of John (Jack) Stewart.
Richard Kerren	January 17, 1814	November 5, 1856, at the age of 42	Sergeant Richard Kerren, stationed at Mission San Diego de Alcalá, amassed substantial wealth through property acquisitions, livestock trading, and possible dealings in government supplies. At his death in 1856, his estate included $8,289 in assets.
Albert Vincent Mayrhofer	1889	1948	Albert V. Mayrhofer, born in San Diego in 1889 to Austrian parents, worked in banking and public relations for the Bank of America. He was deeply active in civic, religious, and historical preservation efforts, including leading the restoration of Mission San Diego de Alcalá Mayrhofer held numerous public roles and was considered an authority on water development in Southern California.
Ysidora Bandini de Couts	23 Sep 1829 San Diego County, California, USA	24 May 1897 (aged 67) Los Angeles County, California, USA	Married Cave J. Couts; daughter of Juan Bandini.
Marco Bruschi	1840	1915	Born in Parma, Italy in 1840, arrived in San Diego in 1869, and became one of its earliest Italian merchants. Before that, he partnered in mining with Pietro Lusardi near Coulterville. Known locally for sealing expeditions and a humorous 50-yard footrace in 1879.
Andrew Cassidy	1817	November 25, 1907	Born in Ireland circa 1817, came to San Diego in 1853 as part of a U.S. Coast Survey team and oversaw a tidal gauge station at La Playa for 17 years. He married into the Serrano and Smith families, acquired several ranchos, and became a prosperous landowner. Cassidy held various public offices and died in 1907.
James Waterman Connors	1830	1913	served in Company I of the 3rd U.S. Artillery.
Cave Johnson Couts	Springfield, Tennessee, November 11, 1821	1874	The Couts family, who owned Rancho Guajome Adobe. Cave J. Couts arrived in San Diego following the Mexican–American War to assist with mapping the border between the United States and Mexico. He was originally buried in the Old Town Cemetery in 1874. He married Ysidora Bandini
William Blount Couts			
David Bancroft Hoffman	1824	1888	Born in Bainbridge, New York, arrived in San Diego in the early 1850s as a ship’s surgeon and later opened a medical practice and drugstore. He served as coroner, district attorney, assemblyman, and port collector, and was a founder of the San Diego Medical Society.
George Alonzo Johnson	August 16. 1824	November 27, 1903	George Alonzo Johnson was an American entrepreneur and politician known for pioneering steamboat navigation on the Colorado River and serving in the California State Assembly. He co-founded George A. Johnson & Company, which played a role in supplying Fort Yuma.
George Lyons			George Lyons, a native of Donegal, Ireland, arrived in San Diego in 1847, having worked as a carpenter aboard a whaler on the Northwest coast. He operated a store in Old Town from 1851 to 1858 and served as San Diego's sheriff for two terms from 1858 to 1862. Additionally, Lyons held various local offices, including city trustee and postmaster, and was a director of the San Diego & Gila Railroad.
Juana de Dios Machado de Wrightington	8 March 1814	24 December 1901 Age 87	Juana de Dios Machado Alipás de Wrightington was a pioneering nurse, midwife, and quilter in Old Town, San Diego, known for her service during the Mexican–American War. Despite being illiterate, she became an expert in nursing, translating, and assisting as a midwife. During the Battle of San Pasqual in 1846, she cared for the wounded, earning the title of "Florence Nightingale of San Diego."
Henry C. Magee			
Charles E. May			
Maria Amparo Maytorena de Burton	1836	13 Aug 1895 (aged 58–59)	
James McCoy	August 12, 1821	November 8, 1895	Born in County Antrim, Ireland in 1821, came to America in 1842, and arrived in San Diego with Magruder’s Battery in 1849. He served as county assessor, sheriff (1861–1871), state senator, and city trustee for 14 years. Involved in tide lands controversy
Miguel de Pedrorena	(c. 1808–	March 21, 1850	Born in Madrid around 1808, settled in San Diego in 1838, and became a merchant, ranchero, and signer of the 1849 California Constitution. He briefly served as alcalde, (Mayor of San Diego)

== See also ==
- Mission Hills, San Diego
