= Thomas Wrightington =

Early settler of San Diego, California (1797–1853)

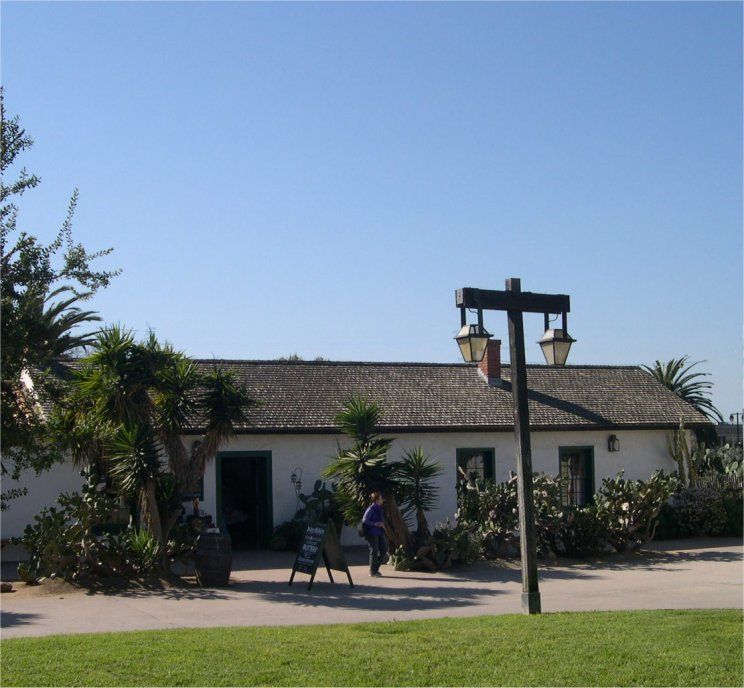
- Wrightington adobe
- Born: c. 1797; Fall River, Massachusetts, U.S.
- Died: July 8, 1853; San Diego, California, U.S.
- Occupations: Shoemaker, businessman
- Known for: Early settler of San Diego, shoemaker, volunteer in Mexican–American War
- Spouse: Juana Machado Alipas
- Children: 3 sons, 1 daughter

Thomas Wrightington (c. 1797 – July 8, 1853) was an early settler of San Diego, California.

Thomas Wrightington was born in Massachusetts. He was a shoemaker from Fall River, Massachusetts and moved to San Diego in 1833. He came with Abel Stearns on the Ayucucho, while Stearns continued up the coast to Los Angeles. Wrightington was probably the second American settler in San Diego, after Henry D. Fitch. Wrightington was naturalized as a Mexican citizen in 1838. He served as a volunteer in the Mexican–American War.

Wrightington married Juana Machado Alipas, a widow with three children and daughter of José Manuel Machado, one of the first soldiers at the Presidio of San Diego and Serafina Valdez. She was born in June 1814. They had 3 sons and 1 daughter.

Juana Machado Alipas de Wrightington, along with being a wife and mother, often rode with Father Ubach into the back country to visit the Indian rancherías and to check conditions. Her neighbors called her the "Florence Nightingale of Old Town".

Wrightington served several offices under the Mexican and American governments. During 1844 and again during 1847 – March 1848 he was Suplente (Substitute Justice of the Peace or Mayor) of Pueblo San Diego.

Wrightington lived in the adobe built by his wife's first husband, Damasio Alipas around 1830. Wrightington added a wing in 1852. The adobe still stands in Old Town State Historical Park, in the west corner of the town square, and is open to the public as a retail store.

Richard Henry Dana Jr. in his novel Two Years Before the Mast commented on first coming ashore at San Diego that

sailor-like, [we] steered for the first grog-shop. This was a small mud building, of only one room, in which were liquors, dry and West India goods, shoes, bread, fruits, and everything which is vendible in California. It was kept by a Yankee [Thomas Wrightington], a one-eyed man, who belonged formerly to Fall River, came out to the Pacific in a whale-ship, left her at the Sandwich Islands [Hawaii] and came to California. ... the liquor was a real (12½ cents) a glass.

Wrightington died in 1853. According to Dana he "fell from his horse when drunk, and was found nearly eaten up by coyotes".

Wrightington's widow, Juana Wrightington, remained in the house until the late 1890s. A room was rented out of her house to Dr. George McKinstry for over 30 years as a physician's office, with Juana as a nurse.

Her final days were spent with her daughter Serafina Israel in Coronado. She died on December 24, 1901. Juana is buried in Calvary Cemetery (now Pioneer Park) in Mission Hills, San Diego with a headstone that reads "JUANITA WRIGHTINGTON 1814–1901".
