= Antonio Grajera =

Spanish commandant of the Presidio of San Diego

- Military career
- Allegiance: Spain
- Branch: Military
- Service years: 1778–1799
- Rank: Lieutenant
- Unit: España Dragoon Regiment
- Commands: Commandant, Presidio of San Diego

Antonio Grajera was a soldier and early Californian pioneer.

Grajera became a Spanish frontier soldier around 1778, and was eventually promoted to Lieutenant in the Espana dragoon regiment. He never saw active service, but was "capable in his duties".

Grajera was appointed as Commandant of the Presidio of San Diego on October 19, 1793. George Vancouver visited San Diego Bay approximately a month later as part of the Vancouver Expedition and was greeted by Grajera and others.

Grajera had no family and his illicit relationships with the women of the presidio, and excessive use of alcohol, caused some scandal. He resigned on August 23, 1799, and never resumed his office.

== See also ==
- Bancroft, Hubert Howe, The History of California (1884) Vol I. 1542–1800, pp. 646.
