= Dennis Gahagan =

Alcalde of San Diego 1849–1850

Alcalde of San Diego
- In office 1849–1850
- Succeeded by: Joshua Bean

Personal details
- Born: c. 1817 Ireland
- Occupation: Soldier, Judge, Politician
- Known for: Alcalde (Mayor) of San Diego, Judge of the First Instance

Military service
- Unit: First U.S. Artillery (Magruder's Battery)
- Battles/wars: Mexican–American War

Dennis Gahagan (born c.1817) was an immigrant in the Mexican Pueblo de San Diego in territorial California, and early settler in the City of San Diego in the new U.S. state of California.

== History ==
=== Mexican–American War ===
Dennis Gahagan was born c. 1817 in Ireland. He emigrated to the United States in the early 1840s. He joined the U.S. Army, which was recruiting for the Mexican–American War.

He arrived in San Diego by 1849 as a soldier with the First U.S. Artillery (Magruder's Battery). He and his fellow troops fought and patrolled in the Southern California countryside during the war.

=== U.S. territorial period ===
In 1849 Gahagan was elected U.S. Judge of the 1st Instance of the District of San Diego. From 1849 to 1850 Gahagan was an alcalde (mayor) of San Diego.

== See also ==
- List of pre-statehood mayors of San Diego, California
