= James W. Robinson (Texas and California) =

American politician (1800–1857)

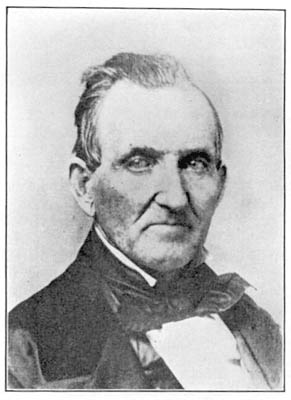
- Born: 1800; Hamilton County, Indiana
- Died: October 27, 1857; San Diego, California
- Occupations: lawyer and politician

James W. Robinson (1800 – October 27, 1857) was a politician in what became the U.S. states of Texas and California.

== Early years ==
J. W. Robinson was born in what is now Hamilton County, Indiana in c. 1791. He was a lawyer and partnered with future U.S. President, William Henry Harrison. He married Mary Isdell in 1820, but abandoned his first wife and five children when he left for Arkansas in 1828. His wife later obtained a divorce.

Robinson moved with Sarah K. Snyder or Snider, to Kentucky in 1828. She was born c. 1810. They later moved to Arkansas around 1830 where they were married. They had one son, William N. born c. 1840.

== Texas Republic ==
Robinson moved to Nacogdoches, Texas in 1833 and received a land grant for a league of land.

He served as a delegate to the Texas Consultation of 1835 as a representative of the District of Nacogdoches. There Robinson was elected Lieutenant Governor of the newly formed provisional Texas government. On January 11, 1836, Robinson was named Provisional Governor of Texas after Governor Henry Smith was impeached by the legislative council, but Smith argued that his removal was invalid as there was no quorum present. Both men claimed the title, but the subsequent Convention of 1836 made the issue moot as it formed an independent ad interim government.

Robinson served in the Texas Army during the Texas War of Independence in 1836 and fought at the Battle of San Jacinto. Following the war, he was elected Judge of the Fourth Judicial District, which automatically made him a member of the Texas Supreme Court. He served until 1840, when he resigned to move to private practice.

During the Mexican raids of 1842, he was captured by General Adrian Woll and brought to Mexico, but arranged his release from Antonio López de Santa Anna in 1843.

== California ==
Robinson moved to San Diego in the Spring of 1850 and was one of the few lawyers there, and was fluent in Spanish, so specialized in land law. Robinson expressed frustration at the Byzantine Spanish and Mexican land grant system, and the large size of the land grants. Robinson was one of the few Americans to speak out against U.S. recognition of Mexican land grants in the Treaty of Guadalupe Hidalgo. He said:

These acts of national robbery, desperate like a vampire, draining the last dollar from the impoverished inhabitants of our State, without law and contrary to law.

The land grants were huge and given to a few favored people by local Mexican officials. Contrary to Mexican law, they were often not approved by the central Mexican government, and other procedures weren't followed (such as a land survey).

Robinson was city treasurer in 1851, school commissioner in 1854, district attorney in 1852–1855, and president of the board of trustees for San Diego during 1853–1855. Robinson helped establish the Democratic Party in San Diego, and was its early leader.

Robinson built an adobe house in Old Town San Diego. The first floor was leased out as a store. At various times, The adobe also served as a schoolroom, office building, Railroad Building, at times. In 1856, Robinson built porches around the first and second floors, causing the local newspaper to call it "the most pleasant in the City." This adobe has been reconstructed and serves as Old Town State Historic Park headquarters, and is open to the public.

Robinson realized that transportation would be important to San Diego. With his associate Louis Rose, Robinson founded the San Diego and Gila Railroad and was elected its president in 1855. The railroad was never built.

Around 1855 Robinson begin to have serious health problems. Robinson Died 1857 in San Diego, California. His obituary in the San Diego Herald said that he was:

the most prominent man during the last six years, in every enterprise which relate to our prosperity and advancement.

Robinson's estate wasn't settled until 1903, after all his children died. By that time he had several descendants.

== External links and sources ==
- Biography in Handbook of Texas Online
- Read James W. Robinson's entry in the Biographical Encyclopedia of Texas hosted by the Portal to Texas History.
- "James W. Robinson and the Development of Old Town San Diego" by Ronald Quinn, The Journal of San Diego History 31:3 (Summer 1985)
- 1850 Census, San Diego, California, p. 278B
- Obituary, San Diego Herald October 31, 1857. Says he died the 27th age 65.

Preceded by Charles P. Noell	President of the San Diego Board of Trustees; 1852–1853	Succeeded by Louis Rose
