= Juana Wrightington =

Pioneer, nurse and quilter in Old Town San Diego (1814–1901)

Juana de Dios Machado Alipás de Wrightington
- Born: Juana Machado; 8 March 1814
- Died: 24 December 1901 (aged 87)
- Burial place: Calvary Cemetery, San Diego
- Other names: Juanita Machado, Juana Ridington
- Known for: Nursing, 'the Florence Nightingale of San Diego', and support of local ethnic people

Juana de Dios Machado Alipás de Wrightington, also known as Jaunita Machado, Juana Ridington or Juana Machado (8 March 1814 – 24 December 1901) was a Californio pioneer and nurse known as the Florence Nightingale of San Diego. She was a nurse and midwife, and translator, despite being illiterate, during the Mexican-American War. She nursed the wounded at the Battle of San Pasqual, and helping the local community.

== Life and family ==
Born Juana Machado on 8 March 1814, to José Manuel Machado, a senior soldier in the first fortified base of the Spanish in the Mexican region, the Presidio of San Diego. Her mother was Serafina Valdez, the daughter of another leading soldier in the presidio, and she was one of nine children. Her first marriage was when she was aged 15, to Damasio Alipás (or Alipaz), and had three children, Romana, Maria Arcadia who married Point Loma lighthouse keeper Captain Robert D. Israel and Josefa.

Her husband Damasio was killed in Sonora around 1835. Five years later, she married Thomas Wrightington (c 1797 -1853), one of the first American settlers in San Diego, who was a shoemaker from Fall River, Massachusetts. He served at senior levels in the region, under both the Mexican and American governments, despite being described as 'one-eyed' and running a 'grog-shop' in Richard Henry Dana Jr.'s 1836 memoir of Two Years Before the Mast. They had three children, José, Serafina, and Luis. As young adults, José was sent back to be brought up in Boston, but offended at his uncle having a black servant, ran away to sea, and became a whaler and married in Chile. Serafina married an American John Minturn. Luis died in San Juan in an accident with a horse.

Her second husband, Thomas died in 1853, also from a horse riding accident, and Juana continued to live in the adobe house they had owned, which was built by her first husband.

Wrightington helped the local priest Father Antonio Ubach, riding with him to translate for local native women, and acted as midwife in the outlying rancheros, delivering babies with both traditional and modern methods of the time. She fostered orphaned or sick children, including a son of an American couple, Diego Hunter, whose mother had died in childbirth and father, a soldier, had to return to America. A doctor rented a room in her house, and she acted as nurse for several years. She was later known for her cactus garden, and quilting and lived until she was 87 years old, dying on Christmas Eve 1901.

== Conflicts and nursing ==
Her life was described in an interview reported in The Historical Society of Southern California Quarterly (1959), translated from the original of 1878.

She recalled full details of being with her father and family as part of the expeditionary forces, including witnessing her father scalping a local native who was a thief and insurgent after stabbing him during a fight. She reported that later all Spanish or native men, women and children had their hair braids cut during the transition from Spanish colony to Mexican governance, and had felt the shame that her father showed bringing his cut hair home.

She was battlefield nurse at the controversial Battle of San Pasqual, 6 December 1846, nursing the wounded.

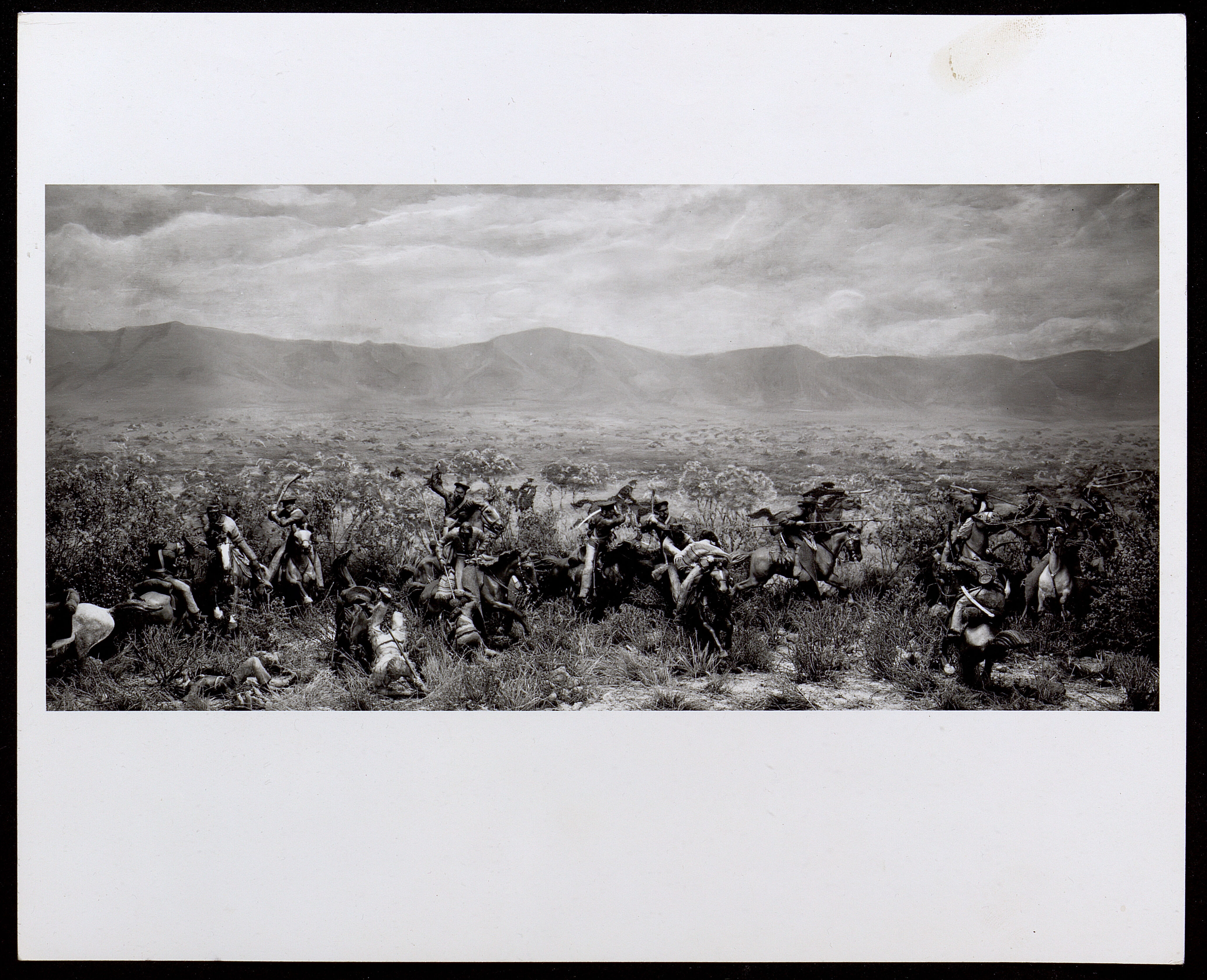
Diorama 1846 Battle of San Pasqual, artist Joseph Leeland Roop

Although illiterate, Wrightington was one of the first woman of Spanish descent to be able speak fluently in English, Spanish and the local languages. However later in life, her lack of documentation meant that she effectively lost her assets in the changes of governments, and so died in relative poverty, whilst living with her daughter Maria Arcadia Israel.

== Exhibition: the Florence Nightingale of San Diego ==
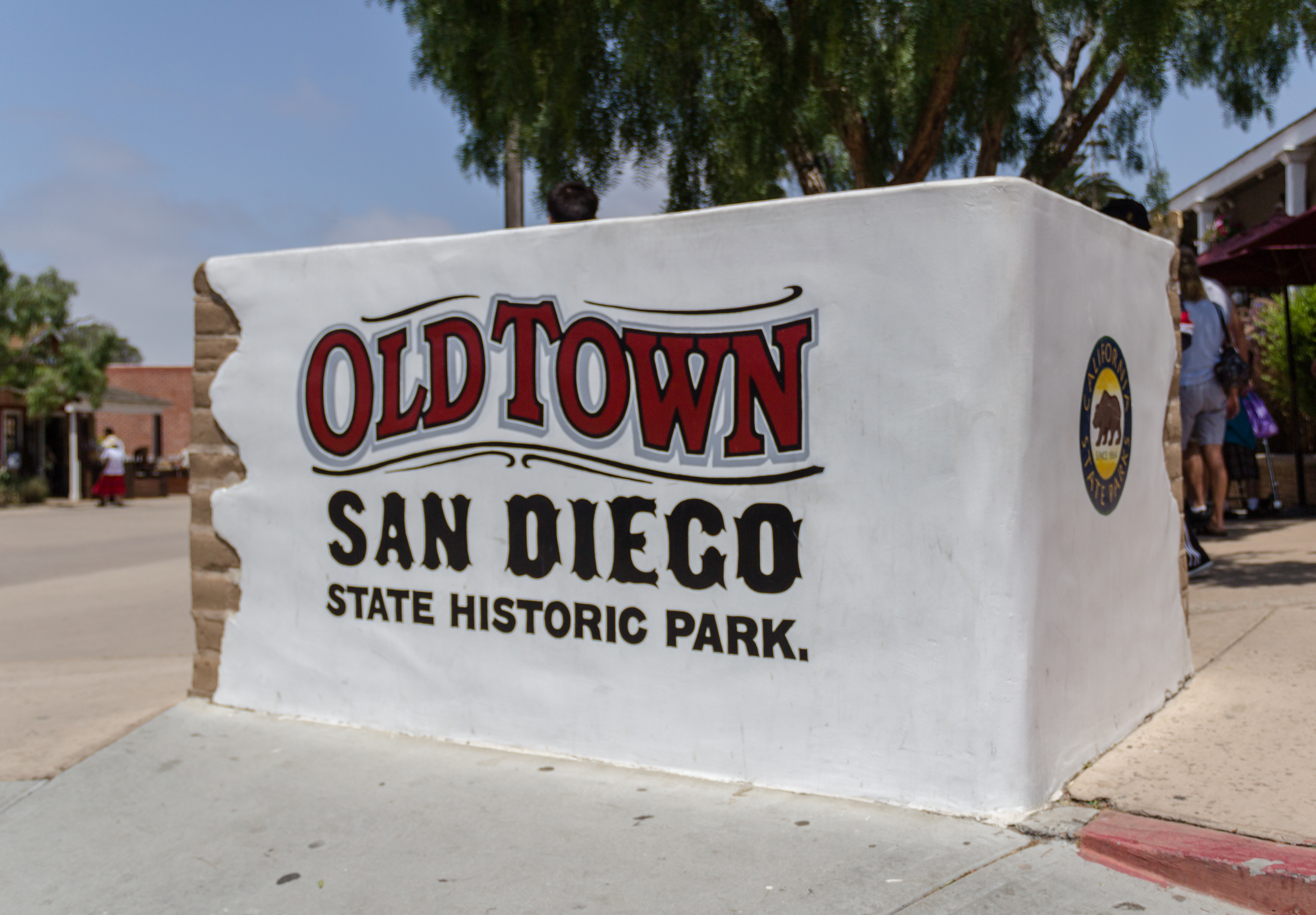
Old Town San Diego State Historic Park

An exhibition was created recognising Wrightington's contribution to the Old Town of San Diego through the Spanish, Mexican and American era, and also noting her personal dedication to the native people she served as a nurse and translator.
