= List of highways numbered S31 =

The following highway are numbered S31:

== Austria ==
- Burgenland Schnellstraße

== United States ==
- County Route S31 (California)
- County Route S31 (Bergen County, New Jersey)
