= California county routes in zone S =

- Example of a California county route shield

Highway names
- County: County Route X (CR X) or Route X

System links
- County routes in California

There are 34 routes assigned to the "S" zone of the California Route Marker Program, which designates county routes in California. The "S" zone includes county highways in Imperial, Orange, Riverside, San Diego, and Santa Barbara counties.

== S1 ==
County Road S1
- Location: San Diego County
- Tourist routes: Sunrise Scenic Byway

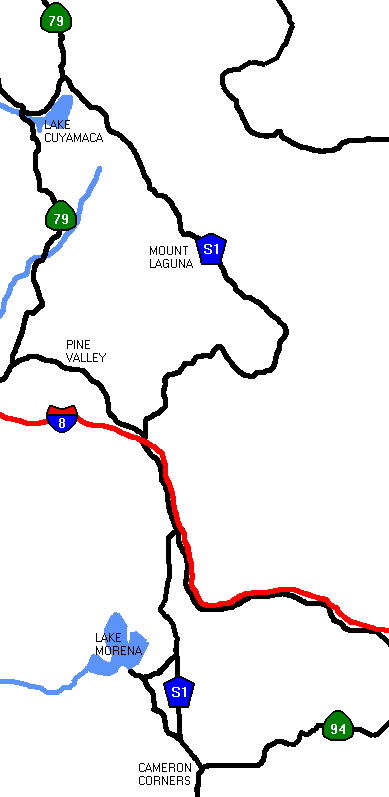
Map of CR S1

County Route S1 (CR S1), also known as Sunrise Highway for a portion of its length, is a 34.08 mi (54.85 km) long county highway located entirely in San Diego County, California, United States. It begins at State Route 94 (SR 94) near Barrett and moves northward across Interstate 8 (I-8), just west of the Laguna Summit. This segment is also known as Buckman Springs Road. North of I-8, it is the Sunrise Scenic Byway, a National Forest Scenic Byway.

Route description

The route begins at SR 94 near Barrett not far from the Mexican border. From there, it heads northward along Buckman Springs Road. Soon afterwards, it enters the Cleveland National Forest. When the road reaches Interstate 8, while Buckman Springs Road continues northeastward across the freeway, CR S1 continues in a northwest direction along Old Highway 80, the original alignment of U.S. Route 80 in California. It then closely parallels I-8 for several miles. Upon crossing the freeway at Laguna Junction, CR S1 separates from Old Highway 80 and becomes Sunrise Scenic Byway.

From Interstate 8, it begins its ascent into the Laguna Mountains. The route here was built along a cliff overlooking Pine Valley to its west. Around here, the vegetation still consists of chaparral and sagebrush. As the route gains elevation through Cleveland National Forest, the route becomes more heavily forested. Around here, numerous campgrounds dot the side of the road. There is a picnic area overlooking Anza-Borrego Desert State Park near the Burnt Rancheria Campground, which is often said to deeply contrast the forest scenery along the route. Upon passing the settlement of Mount Laguna, the vegetation along the route mostly consists of dead trees devastated by the 2003 Cedar Fire. The route continues through the Anza-Borrego Desert State Park.

As the route approaches its north end at State Route 79, Lake Cuyamaca is visible. The north terminus is located just north of Cuyamaca Rancho State Park where it meets SR 79.

History

The route was established by the county in the year 1959, where the entire route was designated as it is now. No major numbering or routing changes occurred throughout its history. The northern segment of the route was also established as a Scenic Byway in 1959.

Major intersections

The entire route is in San Diego County.

Location	mi	km	Destinations	Notes
			SR 94 – Manzanita, Campo, San Diego	Southern terminus
			Buckman Springs Road north (to I-8), Old Highway 80 east	Former US 80 east; north end of Buckman Springs Road on CR S1; south end of Old Highway 80 on CR S1
			I-8 – El Centro, San Diego	Interchange; I-8 exit 47
			Old Highway 80 west – Pine Valley	Former US 80 west; north end of Old Highway 80 on CR S1; south end of Sunrise Highway
			SR 79 to I-8 – Julian, Cuyamaca, Lake Cuyamaca	Northern terminus
1.000 mi = 1.609 km; 1.000 km = 0.621 mi

Gallery

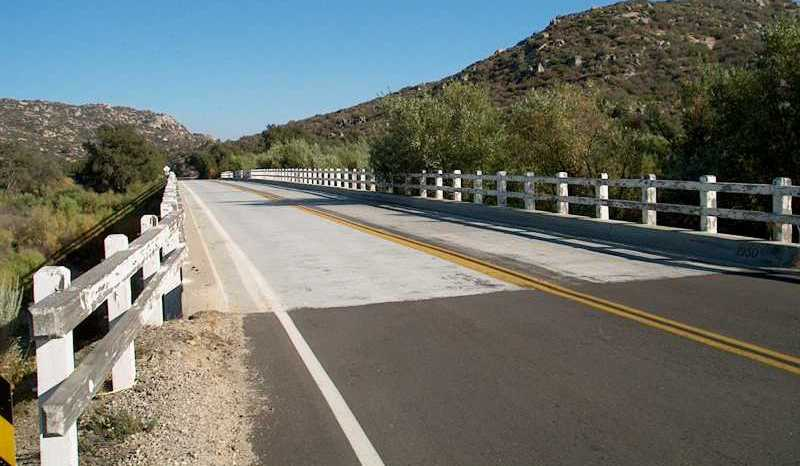
Bridge over Cottonwood Creek

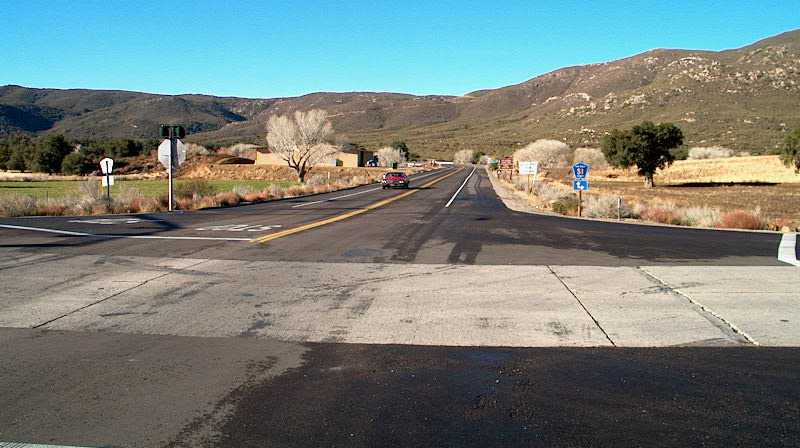
Buckman Springs Road and Old Highway 80

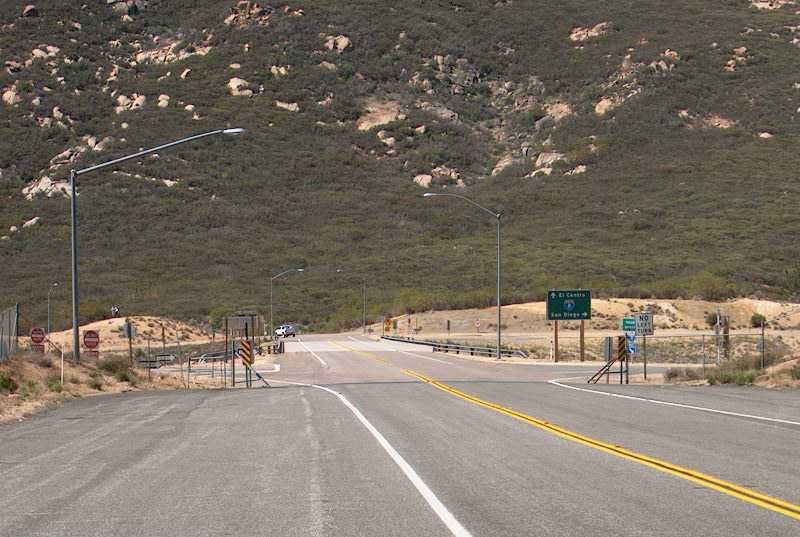
Bridge over I-8

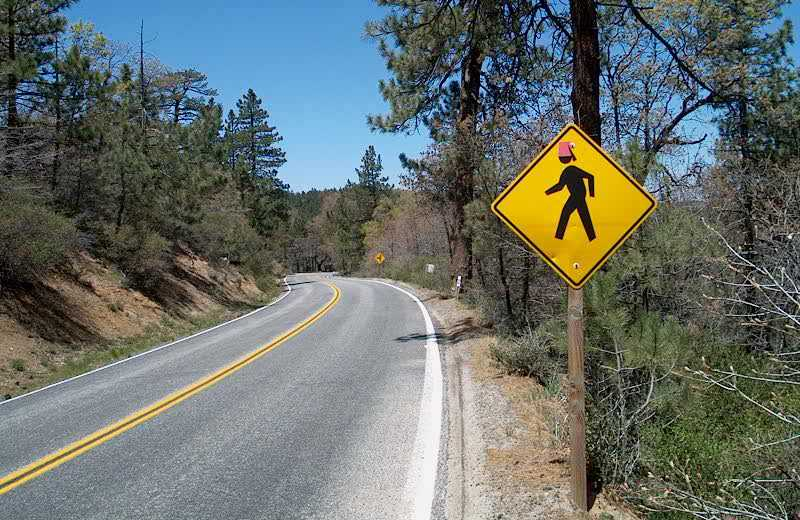
CR S1 near Al Bahr Shrine Camp

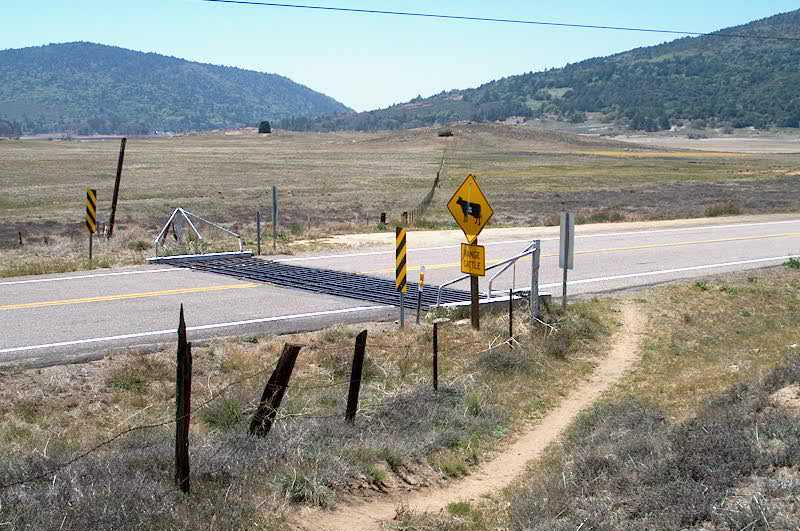
California Riding and Hiking Trail

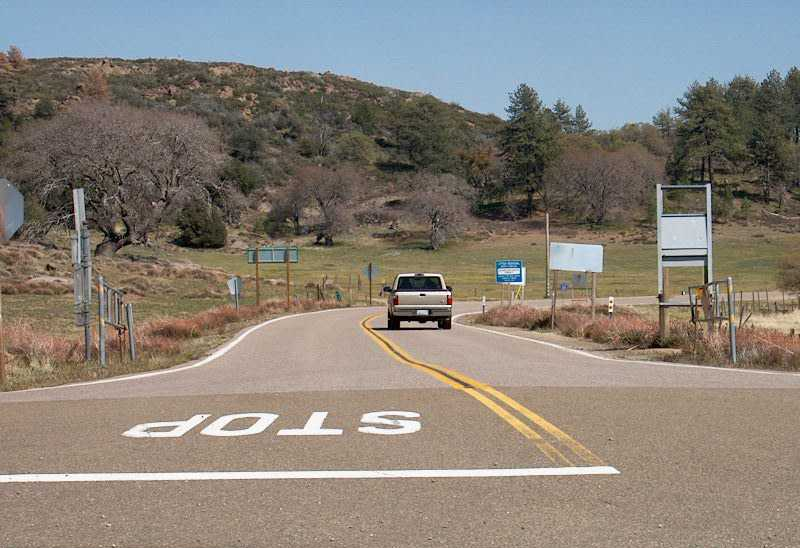
Junction with SR 79

== S2 ==
County Road S2
- Location: San Diego and Imperial counties
- Existed: 1970–present

County Route S2 (CR S2) is a county highway in the U.S. state of California. It runs for 65 miles (105 km), north–south, in Imperial County and San Diego County. CR S2 is the third longest county route in California and is almost exclusively a two-lane rural road. It largely follows the route of the former Southern Emigrant Trail and Butterfield Overland Mail.

Route description

Starting at mile marker zero, the highway begins at a junction with State Route 79 near the community of Warner Springs. As it descends southeast toward the desert floor it becomes San Felipe Road until it crosses State Route 78 at Scissors Crossing in Shelter Valley (formerly called Earthquake Valley). South of SR 78, the name of the highway changes to the Great Southern Overland Stage Route of 1849. It passes through Blair Valley, Canebrake Canyon, Vallecito, and Agua Caliente. Further south, it forks at a remote junction with the historic dirt road to become to Sweeney Pass Road. Sweeney Pass is located between the Volcanic Hills and the Coyote Mountains. East of the San Diego/Imperial County Line of this segment is also called Imperial Highway. The highway runs south through an interchange with Interstate 8 then ends at a junction with State Route 98 near Ocotillo.

Gallery

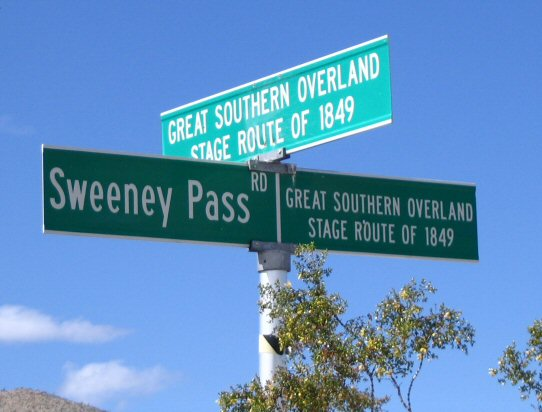
Street signs on CR S2

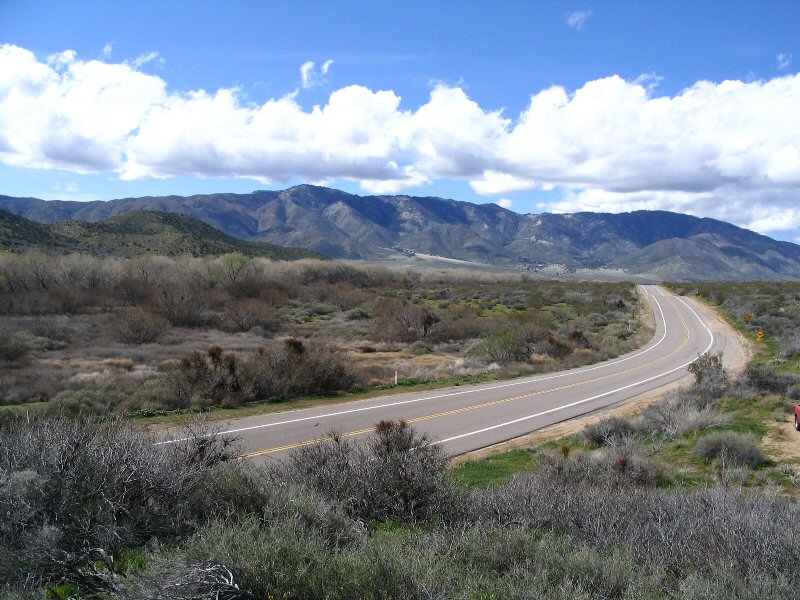
San Felipe Road north of Scissors Crossing

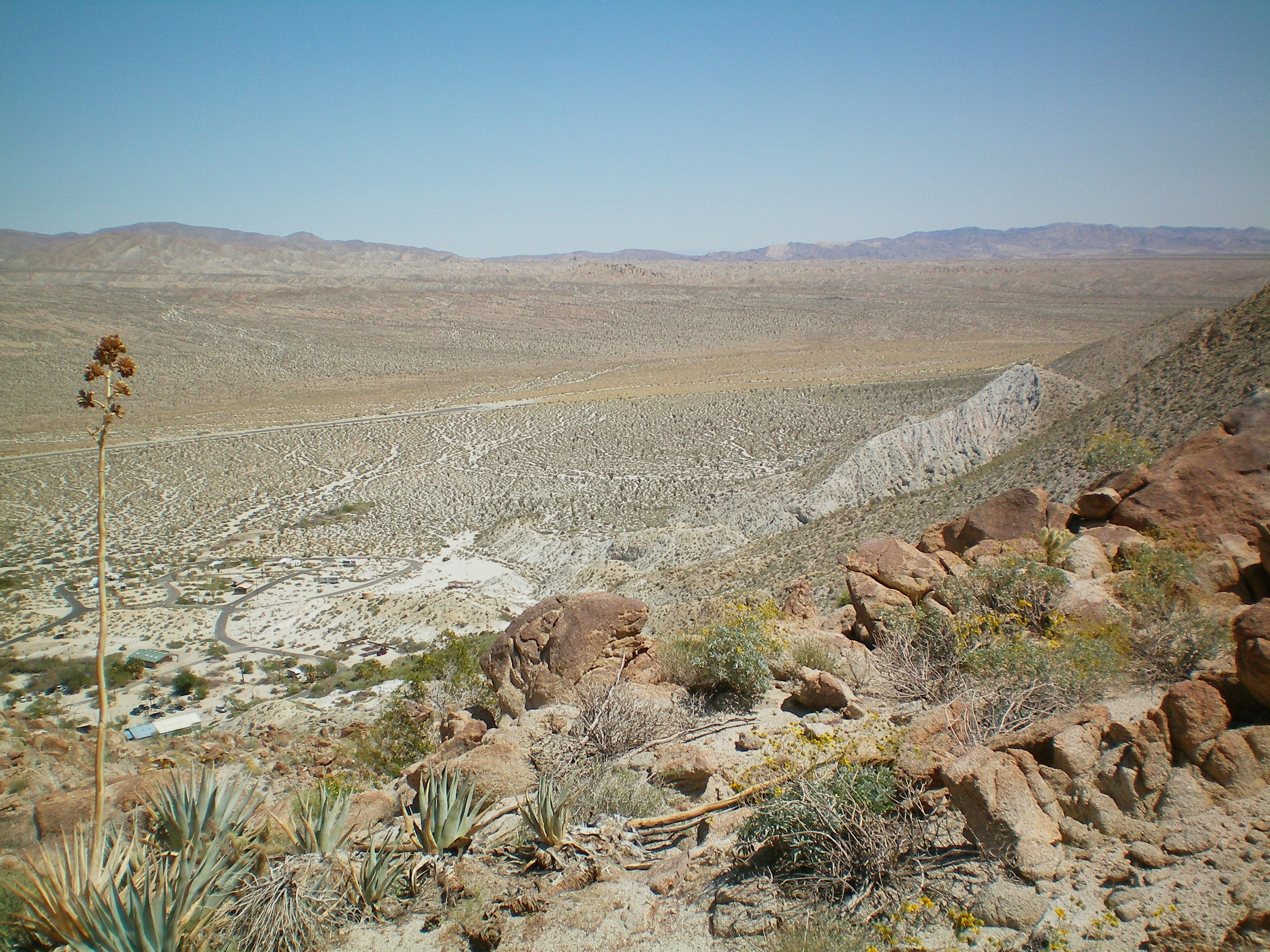
Agua Caliente Springs, desert landscape and CR S2 going south, in Anza-Borrego Desert State Park.

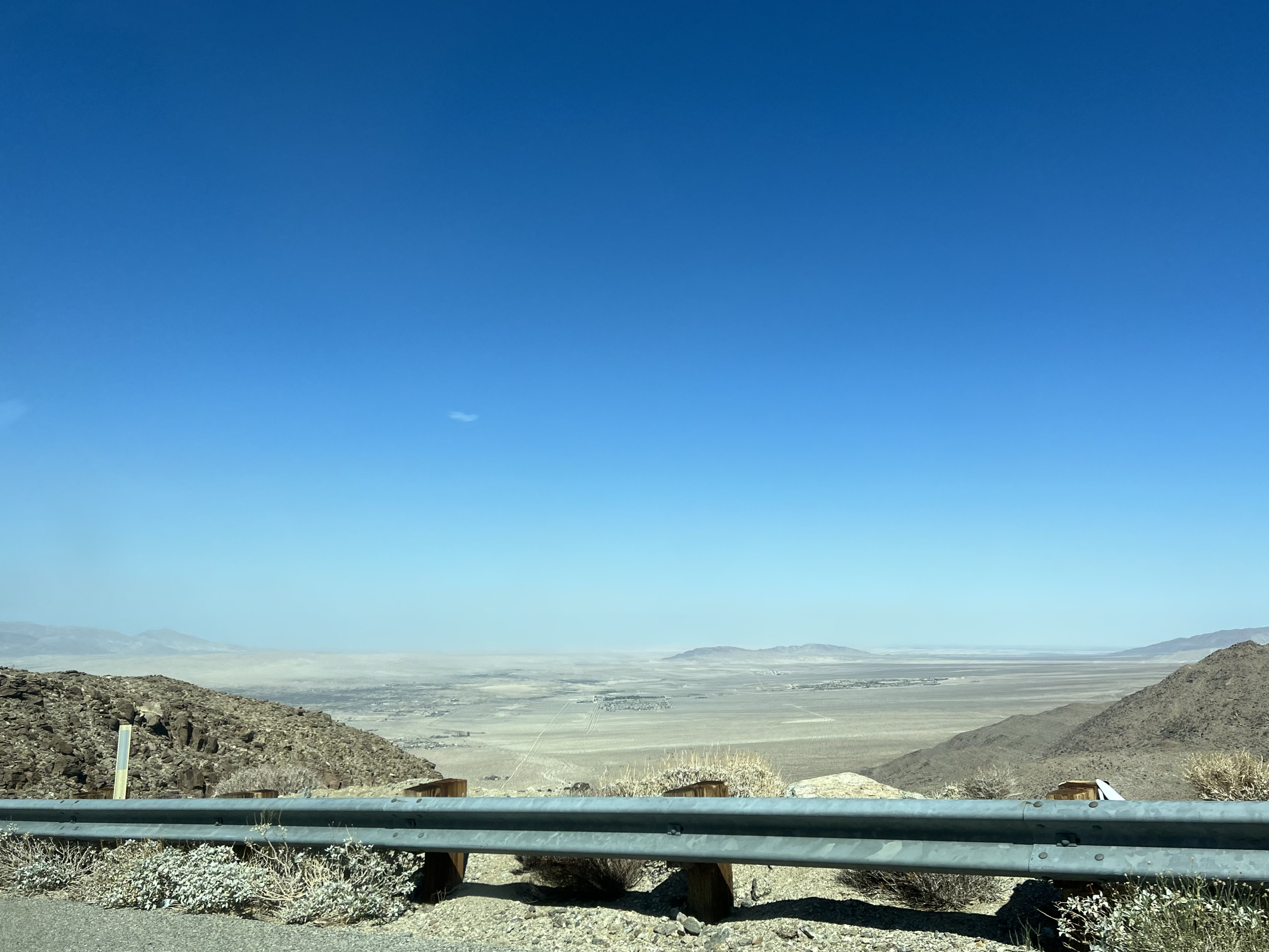
Borrego Springs and the surrounding desert as seen from the descent near the Montezuma Valley Road lookout.

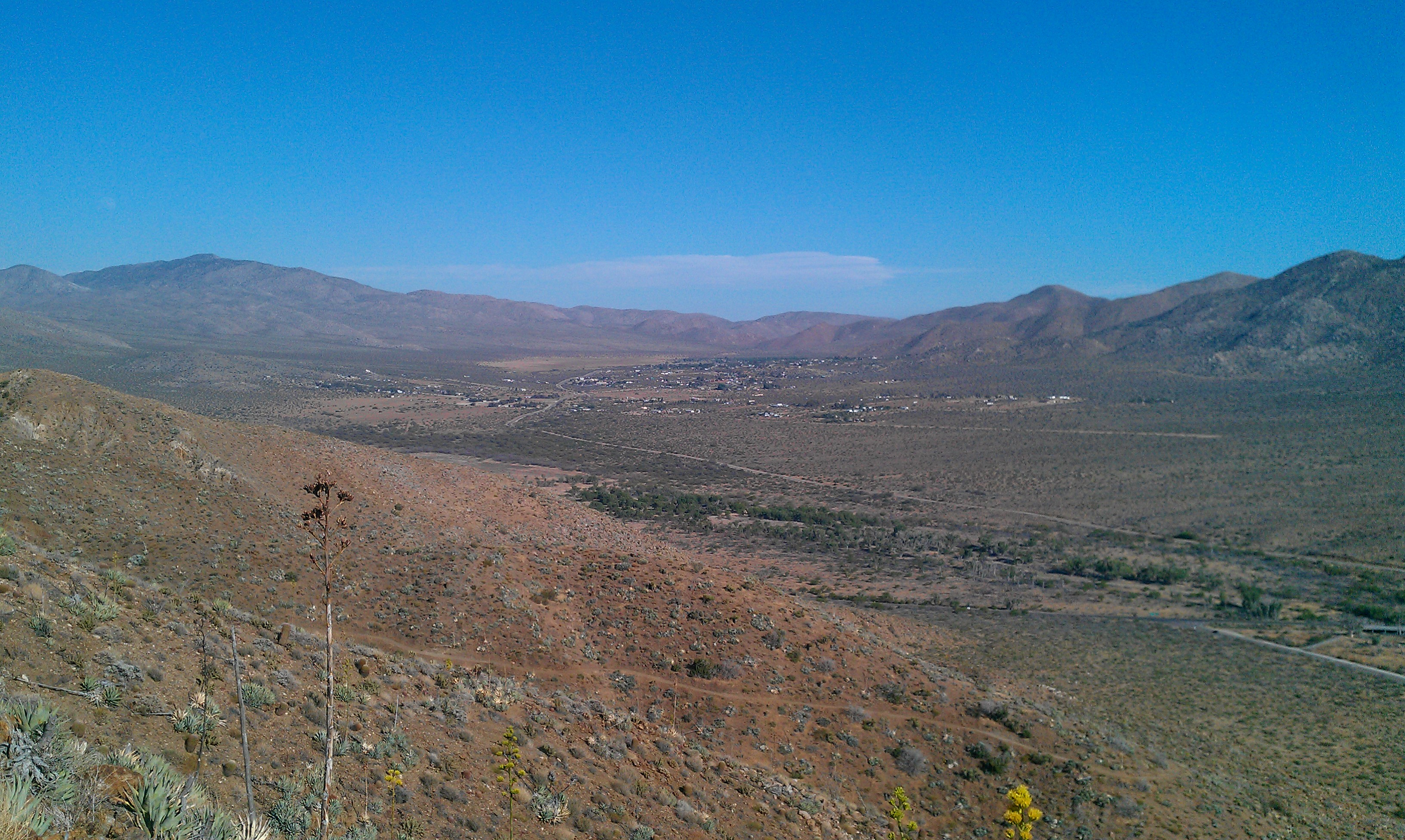
Scissors crossing seen from the north, along the Pacific Crest Trail.:

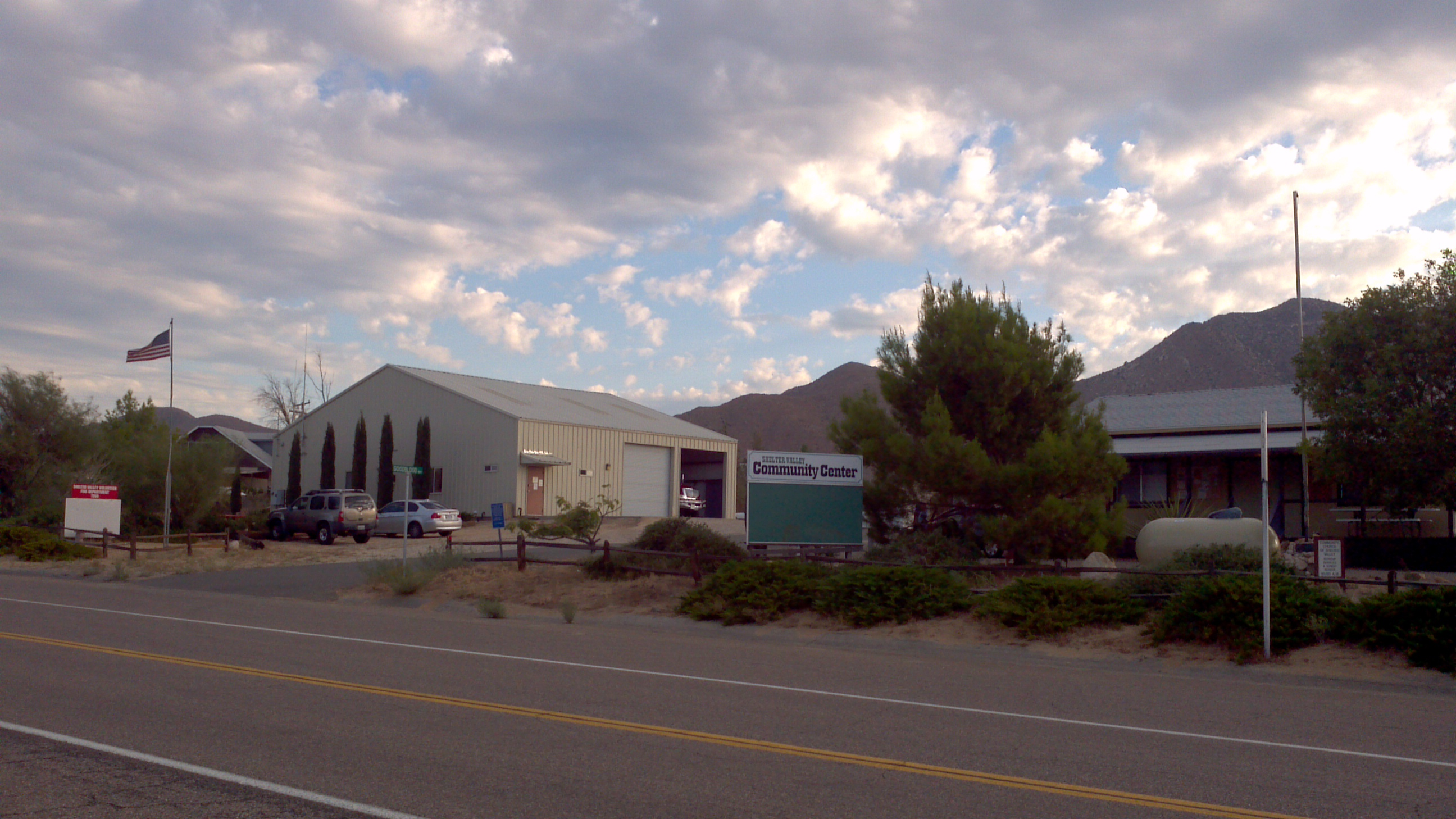
Shelter Valley California Fire Department and Community Center on CR S2.

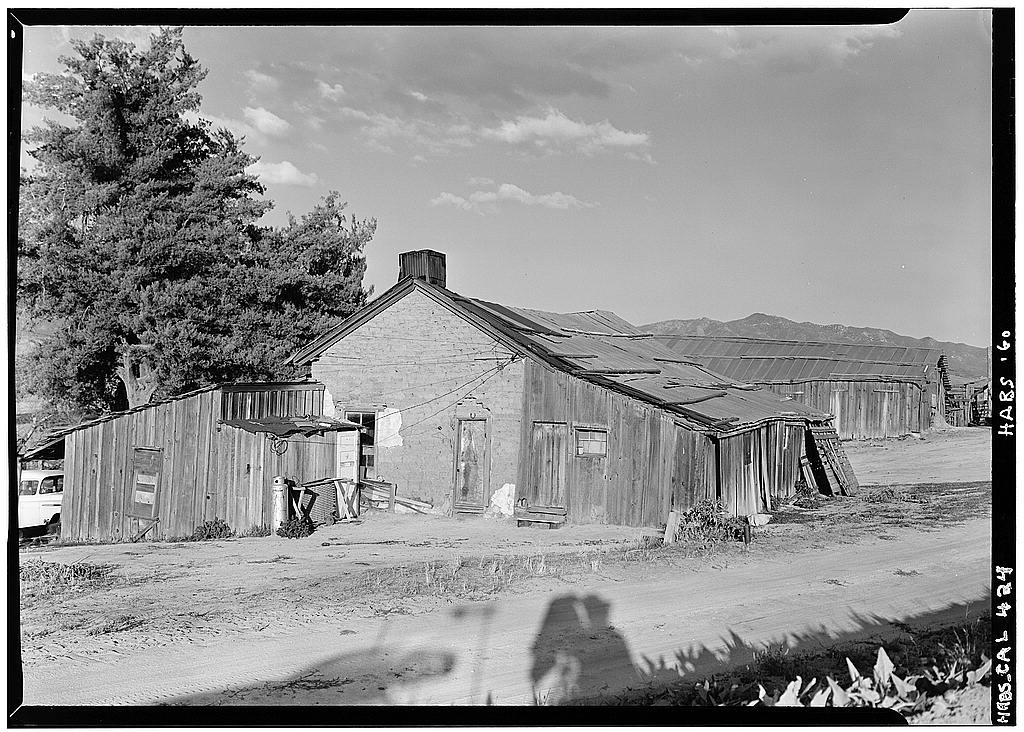
Warner's Ranch, Ranch House, San Felipe Road (CR S2), Warner Springs.

Major intersections

County	Location	mi	km	Destinations	Notes
Imperial				SR 98 to I-8 west – Calexico	Southern terminus
Imperial	Ocotillo			I-8 – El Centro, San Diego	Interchange; I-8 exit 89
Imperial	Ocotillo			CR S80 east (Evan Hewes Highway) – Coyote Wells, Plaster City	Former US 80
Imperial–San Diego county line				North end of Imperial Highway; south end of Sweeny Pass Road	
San Diego				Great Southern Overland Stage Route of 1849 south	North end of Sweeny Pass Road; south end of Great Southern Overland Stage Route of 1849 on CR S2
San Diego				SR 78 west – Julian, Oceanside	South end of SR 78 overlap; north end of Great Southern Overland Stage Route of 1849
San Diego				SR 78 east to SR 86 – Brawley	North end of SR 78 overlap; south end of San Felipe Road
San Diego				CR S22 (Montezuma Valley Road) – Ranchita, Borrego Springs	Western terminus of CR S22
San Diego				SR 79 – Warner Springs, Santa Ysabel	Northern terminus
1.000 mi = 1.609 km; 1.000 km = 0.621 mi: Concurrency terminus

== S3 ==
County Road S3
- Location: San Diego County

County Route S3 (CR S3) is a county highway in San Diego County, California, United States. It begins at a junction with State Route 78 and runs roughly north over Yaqui Pass to Borrego Springs, bearing the name Yaqui Pass Road. It turns left onto Deep Well Trail and left again onto Borrego Springs Road. It ends at a junction with County Route S22 at a large roundabout known as Christmas Circle. Its total length is 12.1 miles (19.5 km).

There is one call box on this highway, located at Yaqui Pass summit.

The highway is part of the Juan Bautista de Anza National Historic Trail Auto Tour Route.

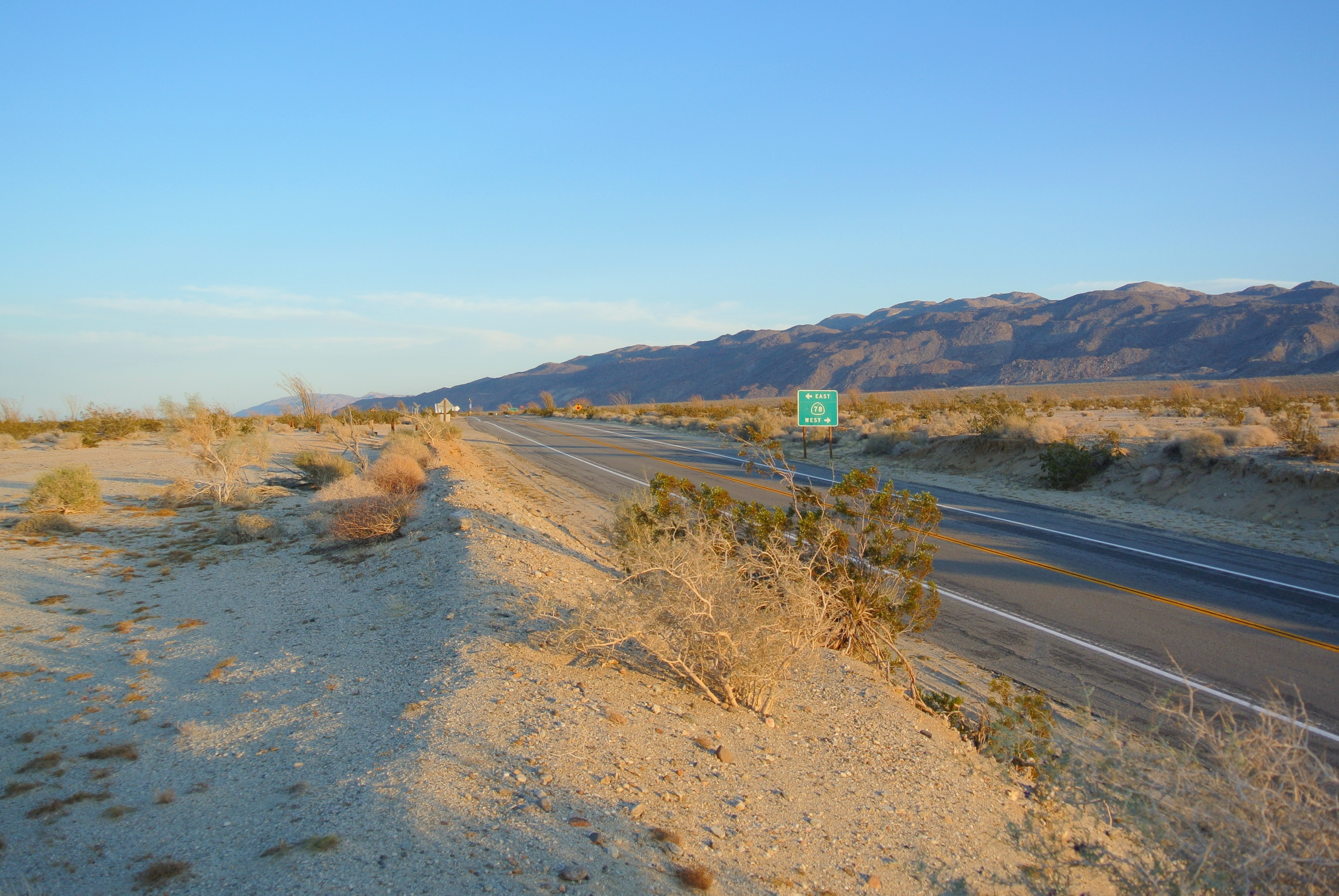
Junction with State Route 78

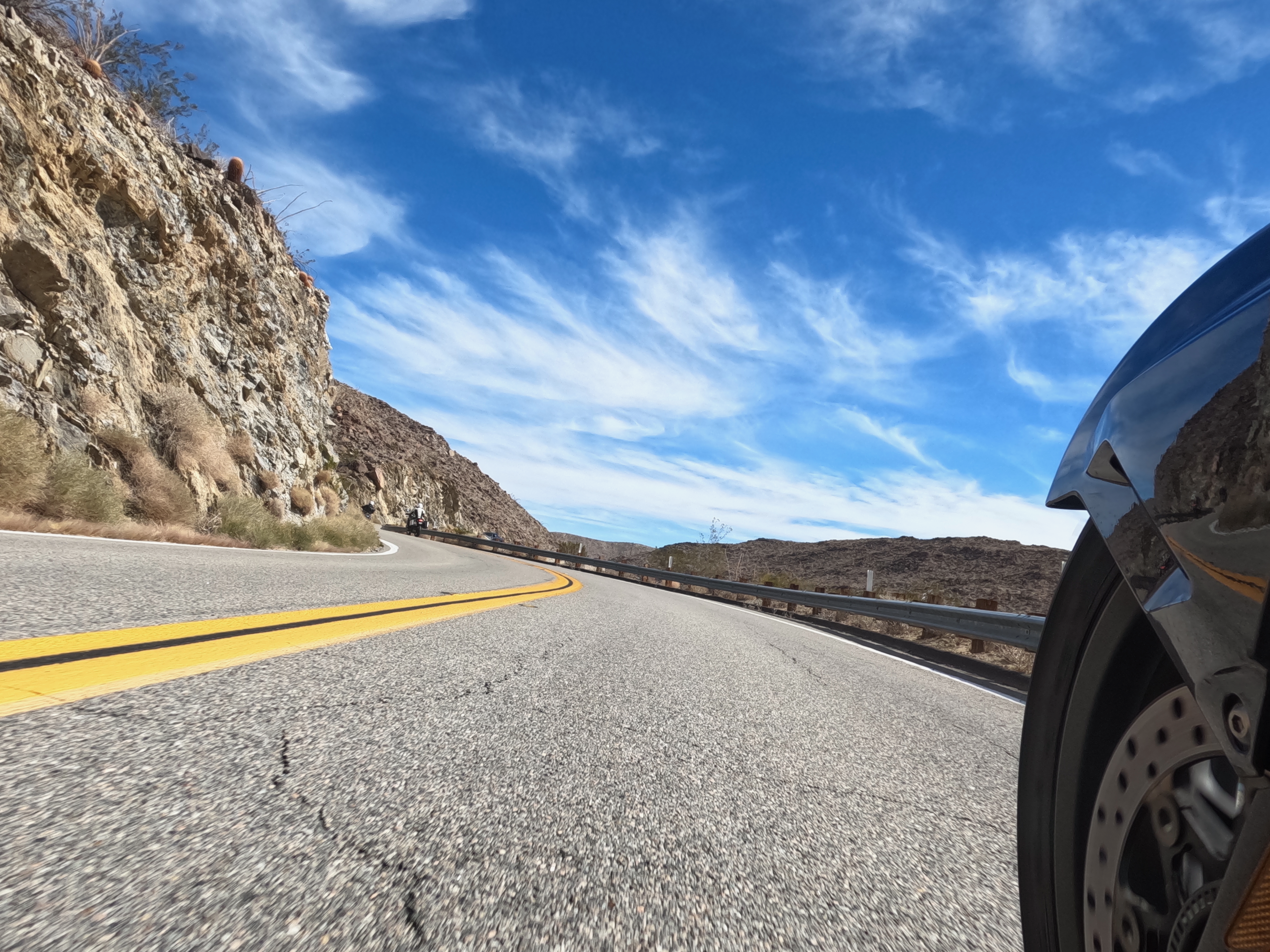
Yaqui Pass Road CR S3 west of Yaqui Pass

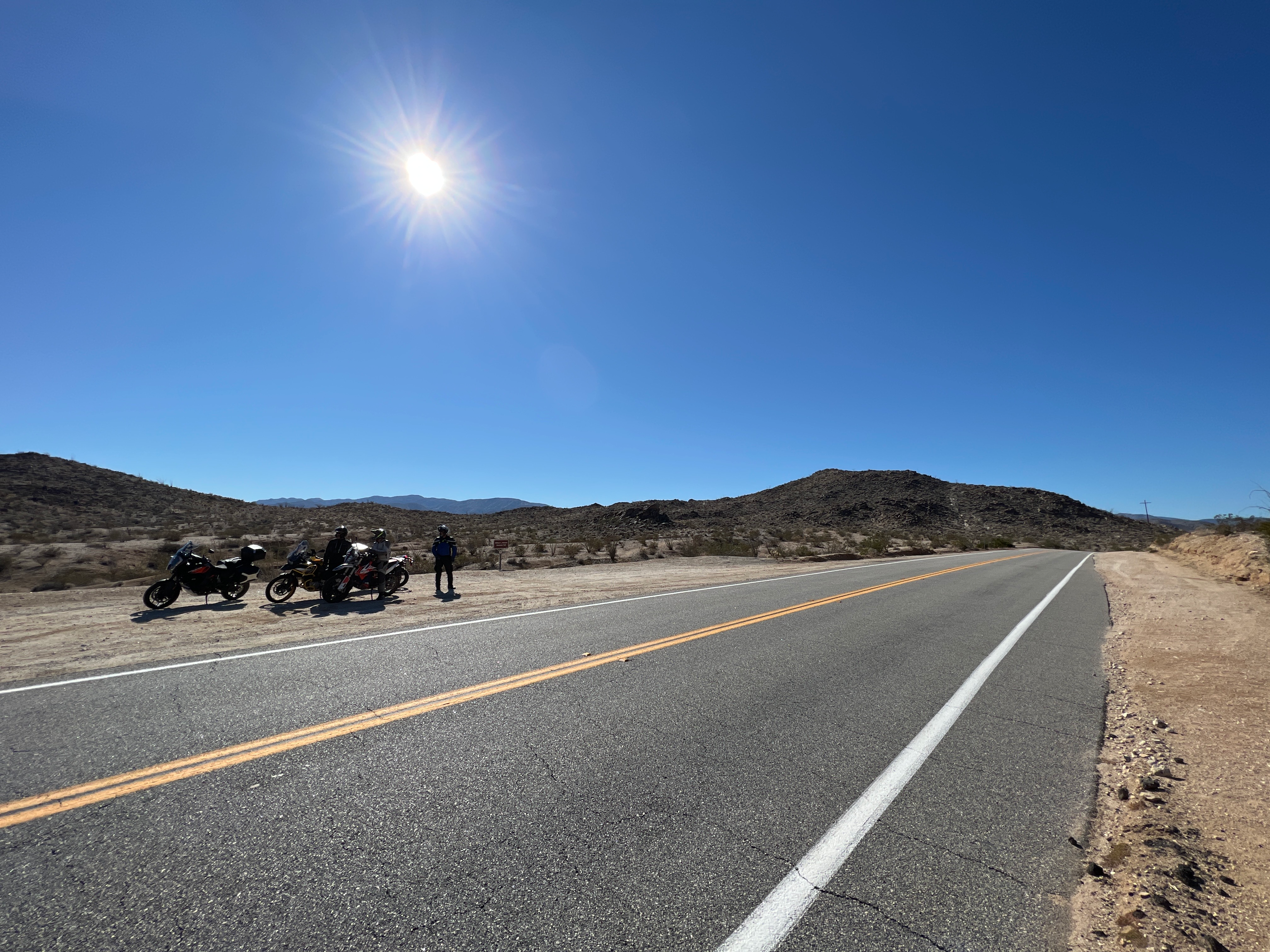
Yaqui Pass on CR S3

Major intersections

The entire route is in San Diego County.

Location	mi	km	Destinations	Notes
			SR 78 – Julian, Oceanside	Southern terminus
			Yaqui Pass Road north – Borrego Valley Airport	North end of Yaqui Pass Road on CR S3; south end of Deep Well Trail
			Borrego Springs Road south to SR 78 east	North end of Deep Well Trail; south end of Borrego Springs Road on CR S3
Borrego Springs			CR S22 (Christmas Circle, Palm Canyon Drive) – Borrego Valley Airport, Salton Sea	Roundabout; northern terminus; road continues north as Borrego Springs Road
1.000 mi = 1.609 km; 1.000 km = 0.621 mi

== S4 ==
County Road S4
- Poway Road
- Location: San Diego County

County Route S4 (CR S4) is a road in San Diego County, California, United States, in the northern city limits of San Diego and in the city of Poway. The route is traversed entirely by Poway Road from Interstate 15 east to State Route 67.

The route's western terminus is at I-15, where the road continues west as Rancho Penasquitos Boulevard, traverses across SR 56, and finally ends as Carmel Mountain Road. Eastward, the road traverses through the city of Poway as Poway Road and has its east end at SR 67. Within Poway, it is one of the busiest streets in the city.

The route was established in 1959.

Major intersections

The entire route is in San Diego County.

Location	mi	km	Destinations	Notes
San Diego			I-15 (Escondido Freeway)	Interchange; western terminus; I-15 exit 18; road continues west as Rancho Penasquitos Boulevard
San Diego			Sabre Springs Parkway	
Poway			Pomerado Road	
Poway			Community Road	
Poway			CR S5 (Espola Road) – Escondido, Lake Poway	Southern terminus of CR S5
Poway			SR 67 – Lakeside, El Cajon, Ramona	Eastern terminus
1.000 mi = 1.609 km; 1.000 km = 0.621 mi

== S5 ==
County Road S5
- Location: San Diego County

County Route S5 (CR S5) is a road in San Diego County, California, United States, in Poway and San Diego. It runs from its southern end at Poway Road (County Route S4) in Poway to its northern end at Interstate 15 in San Diego.

Route description

The road's south end is at Poway Road (CR S4) in Poway. It winds north through Poway as Espola Road and then turns slightly west, ending at Interstate 15 as Rancho Bernardo Road (which continues past I-15).

The route was established in 1959.

Major intersections

The entire route is in San Diego County.

Location	mi	km	Destinations	Notes
Poway			CR S4 (Poway Road)	Southern terminus
Poway			Twin Peaks Road	
Poway			Chabad Way	North end of Espola Road; south end of Rancho Bernardo Road
San Diego			Pomerado Road	
San Diego			Bernardo Center Drive	
San Diego			I-15 (Escondido Freeway)	Interchange; northern terminus; I-15 exit 24; road continues west as Rancho Bernardo Road
1.000 mi = 1.609 km; 1.000 km = 0.621 mi

== S6 ==
County Road S6
- Location: San Diego County

County Route S6 (CR S6) is a county highway in San Diego County, California, United States. It connects Del Mar with Palomar Mountain across San Diego County. It is one of a few San Diego county routes with a discontinuity in its routing.

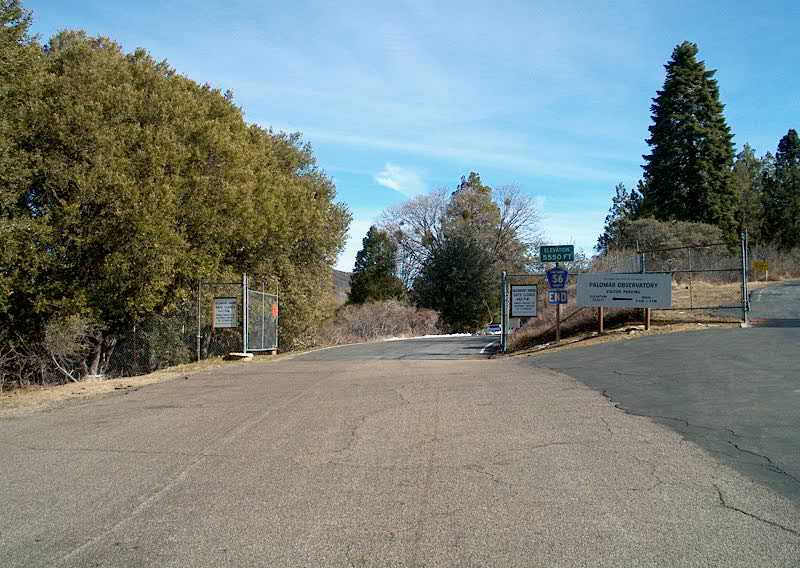
Highway ends at Palomar Observatory

Route description

CR S6 starts at CR S21 in Del Mar as Via de la Valle. It crosses Interstate 5 and meets with CR S8 in Rancho Santa Fe at the intersection of Via de la Valle and Paseo Delicias. At El Camino Del Norte, the name changes to Del Dios Highway, past the community of Del Dios and into Escondido.

In Escondido, CR S6 runs along West and East Valley Parkways, to Valley Center Road through Valley Center. CR S6 ends at State Route 76.

About four miles (6.4 km) east on SR 76, CR S6 begins again as South Grade Road, which winds northward on Palomar Mountain. It intersects with CR S7, then continues north until it ends at the Palomar Observatory.

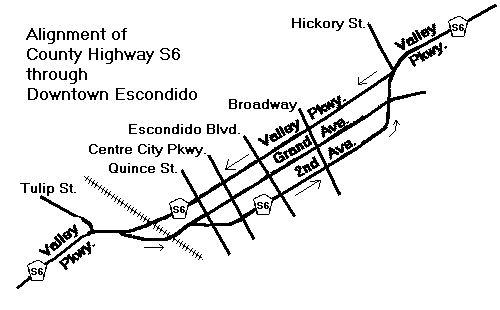
S6 in Escondido

The route was defined in 1959.

Major intersections

The entire route is in San Diego County.

Location	mi	km	Destinations	Notes
Solana Beach–Del Mar line			CR S21 (Highway 101, Camino Del Mar)	Western terminus; former US 101; road continues west as Border Avenue
Solana Beach–Del Mar line			Jimmy Durante Boulevard, Valley Avenue – Del Mar Fairgrounds, Del Mar Racetrack	
San Diego			I-5 (San Diego Freeway) – San Diego	Interchange; I-5 exit 36
San Diego			San Andres Drive	
San Diego			El Camino Real south	
San Diego			El Camino Real north	
Rancho Santa Fe			Calzada del Bosque	
Rancho Santa Fe			Via de Santa Fe south	
Rancho Santa Fe			Via de Santa Fe north – Rancho Santa Fe	
Rancho Santa Fe			CR S8 (Paseo Delicias south) – Solana Beach, Encinitas	Eastern terminus of CR S8; north end of Via de la Valle; south end of Paseo Delicias on CR S6
Rancho Santa Fe			La Valle Plateada, El Montevideo	
Rancho Santa Fe			El Camino Del Norte	North end of Paseo Delicias; south end of Del Dios Highway
			Via Rancho Parkway	
Escondido			North end of Del Dios Highway; south end of Valley Parkway	
Escondido			Citracado Parkway	
Escondido			Auto Park Way	
Escondido			I-15 (Escondido Freeway)	Interchange; I-15 exit 31
Escondido			Tuilp Avenue	Left exit westbound only interchange; at-grade intersection eastbound; no left turn from Tulip Avenue to CR S6 west; CR S6 east transitions onto Grand Avenue; west end of one-way couplet
Escondido			Grand Avenue	Left exit eastbound only interchange; CR S6 east transitions onto 2nd Avenue
Escondido			I-15 BL (Centre City Parkway)	Former US 395
Escondido			Broadway	
Escondido			To Grand Avenue (2nd Avenue)	Interchange; eastbound exit and entrance; CR S6 east transitions onto Valley Boulevard
Escondido			Grand Avenue	
Escondido			Hickory Street	East end of one-way couplet; CR S6 east transitions onto Valley Parkway
Escondido			SR 78 (Ash Street)	
Escondido			Rose Street	
Escondido			Midway Drive	
Escondido			Citrus Avenue	
Escondido			Bear Valley Parkway	
Escondido			El Norte Parkway, Hidden Trails Road	
Escondido			Lake Wohlford Road	East end of Valley Parkway; west end of Valley Center Road
Valley Center			Woods Valley Road	
Valley Center			Lilac Road	
Valley Center			Cole Grade Road – Pauma Valley	
Valley Center			North Lake Wohlford Road, Thundernut Lane – San Pasqual Indian Reservation, Lake Wohlford	
Rincon			SR 76 west – Pauma, Pauma Indian Reservation, Pala Indian Reservation	West end of SR 76 overlap; east end of Valley Center Road
			SR 76 east – Lake Henshaw	East end of SR 76 overlap; west end of South Grade Road
			CR S7 (East Grade Road) / Summit Circle – Lake Henshaw	West end of CR S7 overlap; east end of South Grade Road; west end of East Grade Road on CR S6
			CR S7 (State Park Road) – Palomar State Park	East end of CR S7 overlap and East Grade Road; west end of Canfield Road
			Palomar Observatory	Eastern terminus
1.000 mi = 1.609 km; 1.000 km = 0.621 mi: Concurrency terminus; Incomplete access

== S7 ==
County Road S7
- Location: San Diego County

County Route S7 (CR S7) is a county highway in San Diego County, California, United States, that provides access to Palomar Mountain.

Route description

CR S7's western terminus is at State Route 76 east of Pauma Valley, California. It begins as a dirt road known as the Nate Harrison Grade. Then it returns to pavement as it ascends Palomar Mountain and meets San Diego County Route S6. It enters Palomar Mountain State Park. Then, it descends to end at SR 76 near Lake Henshaw.

Nate Harrison Grade is not signed as County Route S7, but it is a logical westward extension of the signed portion. With a 10% grade, it was the only road to the top of Palomar Mountain until the 1940s, when East Grade Road ("Highway to the Stars") was built for the construction of the Palomar Observatory. The road was formerly known as "Nigger Nate Road", named after Nate Harrison, an early African-American homesteader. The name was changed in 1956 at the request of the NAACP.

On a small turnout is a monument to Gregory Pacheco and a good view to the north. According to a plaque at the monument, pictured below, Gregory Pacheco was a firefighter who died in the La Jolla Fire in 1999. The descent on the eastern side of Palomar Mountain offers panoramic views of Lake Henshaw.

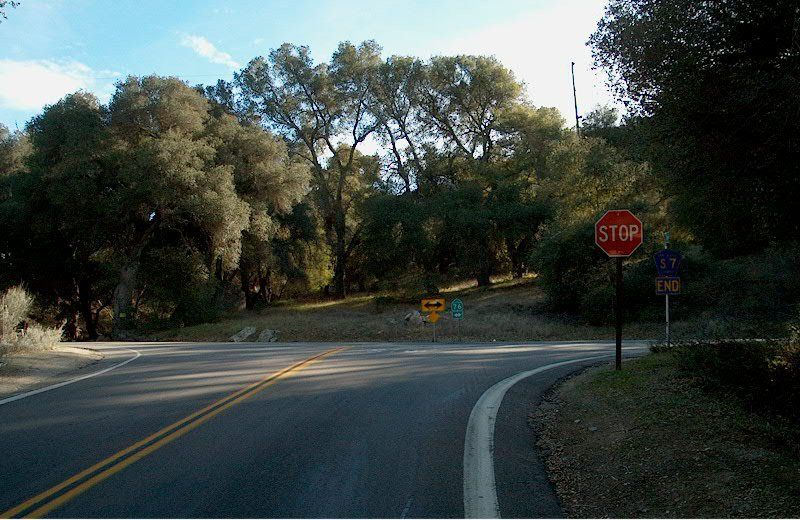
East end on Highway 76

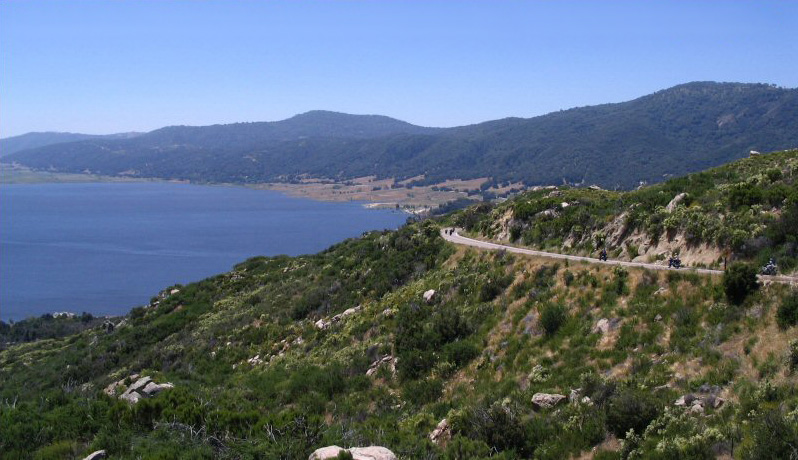
Lake Henshaw from lookout on County Highway S7

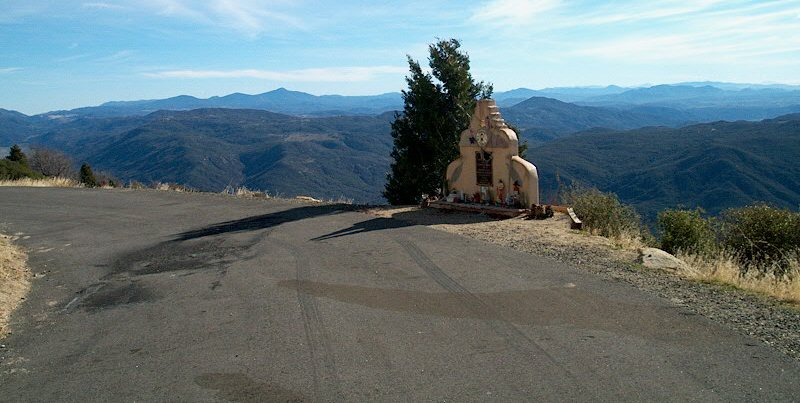
Gregory Pacheco monument

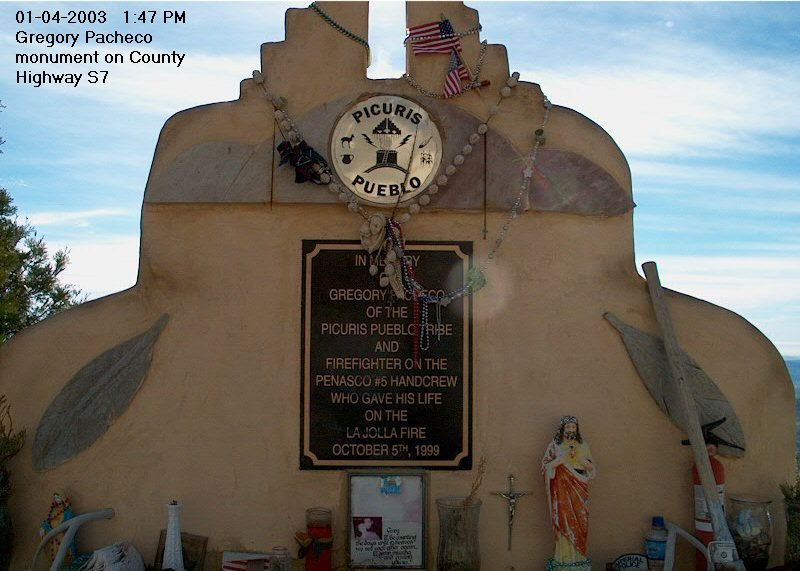
Gregory Pacheco monument

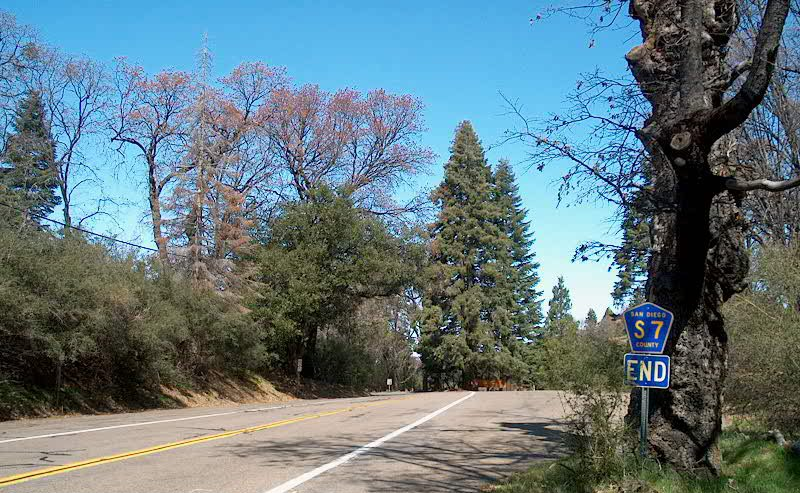
West end at entrance to Palomar Mountain State Park

Major intersections

The entire route is in San Diego County.

Location	mi	km	Destinations	Notes
			Palomar Mountain State Park	Western terminus; road continues into the park, then connects with the Nate Harrison Grade
			CR S6 east (Canfield Road) – Palomar Observatory	West end of CR S6 overlap; east end of State Park Road; west end of East Grade Road
			CR S6 west (South Grade Road) / Summit Circle – Escondido, Oceanside	East end of CR S6 overlap
			SR 76	Eastern terminus
1.000 mi = 1.609 km; 1.000 km = 0.621 mi: Concurrency terminus

== S8 ==
County Road S8
- Location: Solana Beach–Rancho Santa Fe
- Length: 5.3 mi (8.5 km)
- Existed: 1959–present

County Route S8 (CR S8) is a county highway, mostly along Lomas Santa Fe Drive and Linea Del Cielo, in San Diego County, California, United States. Its western end is CR S21 (locally signed as "Highway 101") in Solana Beach and its eastern end is at Via De La Valle in Rancho Santa Fe.

Route description

The route begins in Solana Beach at Old Highway 101. It winds eastward through San Diego County, crossing through Solana Beach and unincorporated San Diego County, and ends at Via De La Valle (CR S6) in Rancho Santa Fe. The last portion of the county road passes through Rancho Santa Fe on Paseo Delicias.

Major intersections

The entire route is in San Diego County.

Location	mi	km	Destinations	Notes
Solana Beach	0.0	0.0	CR S21 (Highway 101)	Western terminus; historic and former US 101; road continues west as Plaza Street
Solana Beach	1.0	1.6	I-5 (San Diego Freeway) – San Diego, Los Angeles	Interchange; I-5 exit 37
	3.0	4.8	El Camino Real	
Rancho Santa Fe			La Floresta	East end of Lomas Santa Fe Drive; west end of Linea Del Cielo
Rancho Santa Fe	5.3	8.5	CR S9 west (La Granada) – Encinitas	Eastern terminus of CR S9
Rancho Santa Fe	5.5	8.9	CR S6 (Via De La Valle, Paseo Delicias) – Del Dios, Escondido	Eastern terminus
1.000 mi = 1.609 km; 1.000 km = 0.621 mi

== S9 ==
County Road S9
- Location: Encinitas–Rancho Santa Fe
- Length: 6.5 mi (10.5 km)
- Existed: 1959–present

County Route S9 (CR S9), mostly known as Encinitas Boulevard, is a road in San Diego County, California, United States. Its west end is at CR S21 (Coast Highway 101) in Encinitas and its east end is at Paseo Delicias (CR S6) in Rancho Santa Fe.

Once outside Encinitas, the county route follows portions of Rancho Santa Fe Road, La Bajada, Los Morros, and La Granada, before terminating at Paseo Delicias.

Major intersections

The entire route is in San Diego County.

Location	mi	km	Destinations	Notes
Encinitas	0.0	0.0	CR S21 (Coast Highway 101)	Western terminus; historic and former US 101; road continues west as B Street
Encinitas	0.4	0.64	I-5 (San Diego Freeway)	Interchange; I-5 exit 41B
Encinitas	2.2	3.5	CR S10 north (Rancho Santa Fe Road)	Southern terminus of CR S10
Encinitas	3.7	6.0	CR S11 north (El Camino Real)	Southern terminus of CR S11
	4.0	6.4	El Mirlo	East end of Encinitas Boulevard; west end of La Bajada
	4.5	7.2	Los Morros east	East end of La Bajada; west end of Los Morros on CR S9
	4.9	7.9	Los Morros west	East end of Los Morros on CR S9; west end of La Granada
Rancho Santa Fe	6.5	10.5	CR S8 (Paseo Delicias) – Escondido, Solana Beach	Eastern terminus; road continues as La Granada
1.000 mi = 1.609 km; 1.000 km = 0.621 mi

== S10 ==
County Road S10
- Rancho Santa Fe Road
- Location: Encinitas–San Marcos
- Length: 9.7 mi (15.6 km)
- Existed: 1959–present

County Route S10 (CR S10), known entirely as Rancho Santa Fe Road, is a road in San Diego County, California, United States, that runs through the North County region of San Diego County.

Route description

CR S10 begins at Encinitas Boulevard in Encinitas, heading in a generally northward direction. It enters Carlsbad and turns eastward. This road travels into San Marcos and passes near the unincorporated area of Lake San Marcos. (The entire run of the road past Carlsbad is located in parts of the incorporated city of San Marcos; often, at this point, the incorporated portions only follow the road, leaving unincorporated islands nearby). Rancho Santa Fe Road intersects with San Marcos Boulevard and continues northward. There is a junction with State Route 78. A short distance north, Rancho Santa Fe ends at County Route S14 (which changes names from Santa Fe Avenue to Mission Road at the intersection).

Major intersections

The entire route is in San Diego County.

Location	mi	km	Destinations	Notes
Encinitas	0.0	0.0	CR S9 (Encinitas Boulevard, Rancho Santa Fe Road)	Southern terminus; road continues south as Manchester Avenue
San Marcos	8.0	12.9	CR S12 (San Marcos Boulevard)	
San Marcos	9.4	15.1	SR 78 (Ronald Packard Parkway)	Interchange; SR 78 exit 11A
San Marcos	9.7	15.6	CR S14 (Mission Road, Santa Fe Avenue)	Northern terminus
1.000 mi = 1.609 km; 1.000 km = 0.621 mi

== S11 ==
County Road S11
- El Camino Real
- Location: Encinitas–Oceanside
- Length: 11.6 mi (18.7 km)
- Existed: 1959–present

County Route S11 (CR S11), known entirely as El Camino Real, is a county route in San Diego County, California, United States. It runs through the North County region in San Diego County, from Encinitas Boulevard (County Route S9) in Encinitas to State Route 78 in Oceanside. As its street name implies, it is part of the 600-mile (965-kilometer) commemorative route connecting the 21 Spanish missions in California (formerly Alta California).

Route description

CR S11's southern terminus is Encinitas Boulevard (CR S9) in Encinitas. It continues northward through Encinitas, intersecting with Lecuadia Boulevard/Olivenhain Road, which leads to CR S10 (Rancho Santa Fe Road) east of this intersection. After this point, it enters Carlsbad, where it intersects with Palomar Airport Road (CR S12). It continues northward through Carlsbad, ending at State Route 78 in Oceanside.

Note that El Camino Real continues for several miles beyond both termini. It extends southward through Encinitas until it reaches San Elijo Lagoon and ends at Manchester Avenue. An unconnected road further east also called El Camino Real starts at the San Elijo Lagoon and continues south for several miles until Carmel Mountain Road. Northward in Oceanside, El Camino Real passes under State Route 76 and ends just north at Douglas Drive.

Major intersections

The entire route is in San Diego County.

Location	mi	km	Destinations	Notes
Encinitas	0.0	0.0	El Camino Real south to I-5	Continuation beyond CR S9
Encinitas	0.0	0.0	CR S9 (Encinitas Boulevard)	Southern terminus
Encinitas	1.5	2.4	Leucadia Boulevard, Olivenhain Road	
Carlsbad	2.8	4.5	La Costa Avenue	
Carlsbad	4.0	6.4	Aviara Parkway, Alga Road	
Carlsbad	4.6	7.4	Poinsettia Lane	
Carlsbad	6.1	9.8	CR S12 (Palomar Airport Road)	
Carlsbad	7.5	12.1	College Boulevard	
Carlsbad	8.4	13.5	Cannon Road	
Carlsbad	9.4	15.1	Tamarack Avenue	
Carlsbad	10.8	17.4	Carlsbad Village Drive	
Oceanside	11.6	18.7	SR 78 (Ronald Packard Parkway)	Interchange; northern terminus; SR 78 exit 2; road continues north as El Camino Real
1.000 mi = 1.609 km; 1.000 km = 0.621 mi

== S12 ==
County Road S12
- Location: San Diego County
- Length: 15.51 mi (24.96 km)
- Existed: 1961–present

County Route S12 (CR S12), also known as Palomar Airport Road, San Marcos Boulevard, Twin Oaks Valley Road, and Deer Springs Road, is a county highway in San Diego County, California, United States. It runs through the North County region of San Diego County from Carlsbad Boulevard (County Route S21) in Carlsbad to Interstate 15 near Hidden Meadows.

Route description

CR S12's western terminus is at Carlsbad Boulevard (CR S21) in Carlsbad. Almost immediately after it begins, CR S12 (this portion of which is called Palomar Airport Road) intersects with Interstate 5. It passes Legoland California and continues eastward, passing its namesake, McClellan–Palomar Airport. It intersects with El Camino Real (CR S11) before running through a number of industrial and business parks. Eventually, CR S12 enters San Marcos, where it becomes San Marcos Boulevard after an intersection with Business Park Drive. San Marcos Boulevard intersects Rancho Santa Fe Road (CR S10) and continues eastward, crossing State Route 78. Shortly thereafter, San Marcos Boulevard intersects with Twin Oaks Valley Road, which assumes the S12 designation after this junction. Shortly after becoming CR S12, Twin Oaks Valley Road passes over Mission Road (CR S14) without actually intersecting it, then continues to the northern city limits of San Marcos. At the edge of the city, Twin Oaks Valley Road narrows into a private road, and CR S12 bears right to become Deer Springs Road, which continues northward through unincorporated land. Eventually the road turns east, and CR S12 ends at an interchange with Interstate 15, though the road itself continues as Mountain Meadow Road through Hidden Meadows.

The route was established in 1961.

Major intersections

The entire route is in San Diego County.

Location	mi	km	Destinations	Notes
Carlsbad			CR S21 (Carlsbad Boulevard)	Interchange; western terminus; former US 101
Carlsbad			Avenida Encinas	
Carlsbad			I-5 (San Diego Freeway) – San Diego, Los Angeles	Interchange; I-5 exit 47
Carlsbad			Paseo Del Norte	
Carlsbad			Flower Fields	Interchange; westbound exit only
Carlsbad			College Boulevard, Aviara Parkway	
Carlsbad			CR S11 (El Camino Real)	
Carlsbad			El Fuerte Street	
Carlsbad			Melrose Drive – Leo Carrillo Park	
Carlsbad–San Marcos line			East end of Palomar Airport Road; west end of San Marcos Boulevard	
San Marcos			CR S10 (Rancho Santa Fe Road)	
San Marcos			Las Posas Road, McMahr Road	
San Marcos			SR 78 (Ronald Packard Parkway)	Interchange; SR 78 exit 12
San Marcos			San Marcos Boulevard east, Twin Oaks Valley Road south	East end of San Marcos Boulevard on CR S12; west end of Twin Oaks Valley Road on CR S12; connects to Mission Road (CR S14); serves California State University San Marcos
San Marcos			Borden Road	
San Marcos			Buena Creek Road	
San Marcos			North Twin Oaks Valley Road	East end of Twin Oaks Valley Road; west end of Deer Springs Road
			I-15 (Escondido Freeway) – San Diego, Riverside	Interchange; eastern terminus; I-15 exit 37
			Deer Springs Road to Mountain Meadow Road – Hidden Meadows	Continuation beyond I-15
1.000 mi = 1.609 km; 1.000 km = 0.621 mi: Incomplete access

== S13 ==
County Road S13
- Location: San Diego County

County Route S13 (CR S13), also known as Vista Village Drive, East Vista Way, and Mission Road, is a county highway in San Diego County, California, United States, that runs through the North County region of San Diego County. It is distinctive for having a three-mile (5 km) discontinuity in Bonsall.

Route description

CR S13's southern terminus is at State Route 78 in Vista, where the street is known as Vista Village Drive. This section of CR S13 is the northern boundary of the newly renovated downtown area of Vista, and in this area the road intersects with Santa Fe Avenue, which is CR S14. Shortly afterwards, the road's name changes to East Vista Way, and continues northward outside the city limits into the unincorporated community of Bonsall.

CR S13 is unusual in that, according to official legislation, its route is discontinuous. In Bonsall, East Vista Way meets State Route 76 and, from this point, loses its status as CR S13. Nearly three miles northeast on SR 76, CR S13 begins again, continuing northward, but as South Mission Road.

Mission Road cuts north through Bonsall and passes the neighborhoods of San Luis Rey Heights and Winterwarm before entering Fallbrook. In Fallbrook, South Mission Road splits off into South Main Avenue, which carries the S13 signage. These two streets run parallel to each other for several blocks; East Fallbrook Road (SR S15) begins at Mission and intersects Main. After a short distance, Mission turns east, intersecting Main; Mission then continues as S13. CR S13 continues eastward, ending at an interchange with Interstate 15.

Almost all of S13, except for later realigned portions, is an old alignment of U.S. Route 395, and Historic Route signs are posted in unincorporated areas.

The route was established in 1968.

Major intersections

The entire route is in San Diego County.

Location	mi	km	Destinations	Notes
Vista			SR 78 (Ronald Packard Parkway)	Interchange; southern terminus; SR 78 east exit 6B, west exit 6; road continues south as Vista Village Drive to Hacienda Drive
Vista			West Vista Way	
Vista			CR S14 (Santa Fe Avenue) – Downtown Vista	
Vista			Civic Center Drive, Hillside Terrace	South end of Vista Village Drive; north end of East Vista Way
Vista			Vale Terrace Drive, Anza Avenue	
Vista			Foothill Drive, Bobier Drive	
			Gopher Canyon Road to I-15	
			SR 76 west / Old River Road – Oceanside	South end of SR 76 overlap; north end of East Vista Way
			SR 76 east (Pala Road) to I-15	North end of SR 76 overlap; south end of South Mission Road
Fallbrook			Ammunition Road	
Fallbrook			CR S15 (Fallbrook Street)	Western terminus of CR S15
Fallbrook			Hill Street	North end of South Mission Road; south end of West Mission Road
Fallbrook			Pico Avenue to De Luz Road	
Fallbrook			Main Avenue	North end of West Mission Road; south end of East Mission Road
			Stage Coach Lane	
			Old Highway 395 to CR S15 (Reche Road)	Former US 395 south
			I-15 (Escondido Freeway)	Interchange; eastern terminus; I-15 exit 51
			Mission Road to Old Highway 395	Continuation beyond I-15; former US 395 north
1.000 mi = 1.609 km; 1.000 km = 0.621 mi: Concurrency terminus

== S14 ==
County Road S14
- Location: San Diego County

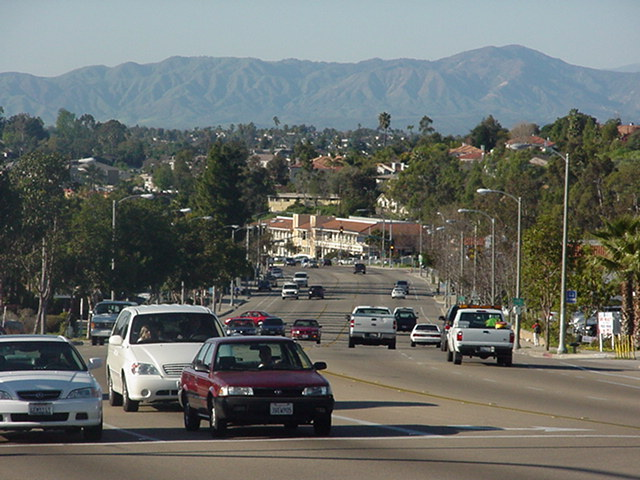
S14 in Vista

County Route S14 (CR S14), also known as Santa Fe Avenue, Mission Road, and Mission Avenue, is a county highway in San Diego County, California, United States, that runs through the North County region of San Diego County. It runs from State Route 76 in Oceanside to Centre City Parkway in Escondido.

Route description

CR S14's western terminus is at State Route 76 in Oceanside, where it is known as North Santa Fe Avenue. It travels into Vista, becoming South Santa Fe Avenue before intersecting with County Route S13, or Vista Village Drive, in downtown Vista. At this point it begins to run parallel to State Route 78, which it does until its terminus. Santa Fe travels into western San Marcos, where it intersects with County Route S10 (Rancho Santa Fe Road); it is at this intersection that Santa Fe becomes Mission Road. Mission continues through San Marcos, passing under Twin Oaks Valley Road (County Route S12) without an intersection. In eastern San Marcos, Mission Road crosses State Route 78 without an interchange and becomes Mission Avenue. Shortly afterward, it enters Escondido, where it crosses Interstate 15, again with no interchange. Shortly after this point, the freeway portion of SR 78 ends and that route turns right onto Broadway, but CR S14's eastern terminus is at Centre City Parkway, a few blocks short from Broadway.

CR S14 east of CR S13, except for later realigned portions, is an old alignment of U.S. Route 395, and Historic Route signs are posted in unincorporated areas.

The route was established in 1968.

Major intersections

The entire route is in San Diego County.

Location	mi	km	Destinations	Notes
Oceanside			SR 76	Western terminus; road continues as Santa Fe Avenue to Via Manos
Oceanside			Mesa Drive	
Oceanside			Melrose Drive	
Vista			Bobier Drive	
Vista			CR S13 (Vista Village Drive)	
Vista			Civic Center Drive	
Vista			Mar Vista Drive	
			Robelini Drive	
			Buena Creek Road	
San Marcos			CR S10 (Rancho Santa Fe Road)	Northern terminus of CR S10; east end of Santa Fe Avenue; west end of Mission Road
San Marcos			Las Posas Road	
San Marcos			Knoll Road	
San Marcos			San Marcos Boulevard, Woodward Street	
San Marcos			Woodland Parkway	
San Marcos			Bennett Avenue, Rancheros Drive	
Escondido			Auto Park Way	
Escondido			Andreasen Drive	East end of Mission Road; west end of Mission Avenue
Escondido			Rock Springs Road	
Escondido			I-15 BL (Centre City Parkway) to SR 78 west	Eastern terminus; road continues as Mission Avenue
1.000 mi = 1.609 km; 1.000 km = 0.621 mi

== S15 ==
County Road S15
- Location: San Diego County

County Route S15 (CR S15) is a county highway in San Diego County, California, United States. It runs from County Route S13 (Mission Road) in Fallbrook to Old Highway 395.

Route description

CR S15's western terminus is at CR S13, also known as Mission Road, in Fallbrook. It begins as East Fallbrook Street. At the intersection with South Stage Coach Lane, CR S15 continues south to the intersection with Reche Road, at which point CR S15 again heads east. CR S15 continues east as Reche Road until it reaches its eastern terminus at the intersection with Old Highway 395, adjacent to Interstate 15.

The route was established in 1959.

Major intersections

The entire route is in San Diego County.

Location	mi	km	Destinations	Notes
Fallbrook			CR S13 (Mission Road)	Western terminus; road continues west as Fallbrook Street
Fallbrook			Fallbrook Street east, Stage Coach Lane north	East end of Fallbrook Street on CR S15; west end of Stage Coach Lane on CR S15
Fallbrook			Stage Coach Lane south, Reche Road west	East end of Stage Coach Lane on CR S15; west end of Reche Road on CR S15
			Old Highway 395 to I-15	Eastern terminus; former US 395
1.000 mi = 1.609 km; 1.000 km = 0.621 mi

== S16 ==
County Road S16
- Location: San Diego – Riverside Counties

County Route S16 (CR S16), also known as Pala-Temecula Road, Pala Road, and Pechanga Parkway, is a county highway in San Diego and Riverside counties in California, United States. It runs from its south end at State Route 76 on the Pala Indian Reservation to its north end at State Route 79 (Temecula Parkway) in Temecula.

Route description

The route's southern terminus is at SR 76 on the Pala Indian Reservation, in the San Luis Rey River Valley, near the community of Pala. It twists through a short but rugged and steep mountain range and continues northward as Pala-Temecula Road through rural San Diego County.

When it crosses the Riverside County line and enters the Pechanga Indian Reservation, it becomes Pala Road. Shortly thereafter, County Route S16 widens to four lanes as it reaches the city limits of Temecula, where it becomes Pechanga Parkway. Near the Pechanga Resort & Casino, Pechanga Parkway becomes a six-lane arterial road and continues along several large suburban neighborhoods before ending at a T intersection with SR 79 (Temecula Parkway). The portion of County Route S16 known as Pechanga Parkway, as well as the portion of SR 79 known as Temecula Parkway, are unsigned because the City of Temecula maintains jurisdiction over both segments.

The route was established in 1959.

Major intersections

County	Location	mi	km	Destinations	Notes
San Diego	Pala			SR 76	Southern terminus
San Diego	Pala			Apapas Road	North end of Pala Mission Road on CR S16; south end of Pala Temecula Road; SR 76 west is via a right turn on Pala Mission Road; SR 76 east is via a left turn on Pala Mission Road
San Diego–Riverside county line				Poco Tropical Road	North end of Pala Temecula Road; south end of Pala Road
Riverside	Temecula			Pechanga Road	North end of Pala Road; south end of Pechanga Parkway
Riverside	Temecula			Wolf Valley Road, Via Eduardo	
Riverside	Temecula			Rainbow Canyon Road	Former US 395 south
Riverside	Temecula			SR 79 (Temecula Parkway) to I-15	Northern terminus
1.000 mi = 1.609 km; 1.000 km = 0.621 mi

== S17 ==
County Road S17
- Location: San Diego County

County Route S17 (CR S17) is a county highway in San Diego County, California, United States. It runs from Interstate 5 in Chula Vista to Interstate 8 in El Cajon. The route consists of portions of several roads passing through the cities of Chula Vista and El Cajon, and the unincorporated communities of Bonita, Spring Valley, and Rancho San Diego.

County Route S17 roughly parallels State Route 54 from Interstate 5 east to State Route 125, running along E Street, Bonita Road, Sweetwater Road, South Worthington Street, and Paradise Valley Road. The route then shares the same alignment as State Route 54, from State Route 125 northeast to the El Cajon city limit, running along Jamacha Boulevard, Campo Road, and Jamacha Road. Within El Cajon, CR S17 shares the same alignment as the former State Route 54, continuing north to Interstate 8 along Jamacha Road and 2nd Street.

The portions of County Route S17 within the cities of Chula Vista and El Cajon are no longer signed. The portions of the route within Bonita and Spring Valley are signed. However, all signs in Rancho San Diego (along Campo and Jamacha Roads) appear to have been removed except for the one heading east coming from the terminus of the freeway portion of State Route 94. In El Cajon city limits, the route is signed with Business Route 54.

The route was established in 1964.

Major intersections

The entire route is in San Diego County.

Location	mi	km	Destinations	Notes
Chula Vista			I-5 (San Diego Freeway) to SR 54 east	Interchange; western terminus; I-5 exit 8B; road continues as E Street to Bay Boulevard
Chula Vista			Broadway	
Chula Vista			Fourth Avenue – Civic Center	
Chula Vista			Third Avenue – Downtown	
Chula Vista			Second Avenue	
Chula Vista			Bonita Road west, East Flower Street	East end of E Street; west end of Bonita Road on CR S17
Chula Vista			I-805 (Jacob Dekema Freeway)	Interchange; I-805 north exit 7, south exit 7C
Chula Vista			Willow Street, Old Orchard Lane	
Chula Vista			Otay Lakes Road	
Bonita			Central Avenue	
Bonita			San Miguel Road	
Bonita			Sweetwater Road west, Simbar Road (private road)	East end of Bonita Road; west end of Sweetwater Road on CR S17
La Presa			East end of Sweetwater Road on CR S17; west end of Worthington Street	
La Presa			Worthington Street north, Paradise Valley Road west	East end of Worthington Street on CR S17; west end of Paradise Valley Road on CR S17
La Presa			Elkelton Boulevard, Elkelton Place to SR 125 north	
La Presa			SR 54 west (South Bay Freeway, SR 125 south) / Sweetwater Road	Interchange; SR 125 north exit 12; east end of Paradise Valley Road; west end of Jamacha Boulevard
Spring Valley			Sweetwater Springs Boulevard	
Spring Valley			SR 94 west (Campo Road) – San Diego	West end of SR 94 overlap and Campo Road on CR S17; east end of Jamacha Boulevard
Spring Valley			SR 94 east (Campo Road) – Jamul Indian Village, Campo	East end of SR 94 overlap and Campo Road on CR S17; west end of SR 54 (eastern section) overlap and Jamacha Road
Rancho San Diego			Willow Glen Drive – Jamul, Harbison Canyon	
Rancho San Diego			Chase Avenue	
El Cajon			East end of SR 54 (eastern section) overlap; west end of SR 54 BR overlap	
El Cajon			Washington Avenue	
El Cajon			East Main Street	Former US 80; east end of Jamacha Road; west end of 2nd Street on CR S17
El Cajon			I-8 – El Centro, San Diego	Interchange; eastern terminus; I-8 exit 19; east end of SR 54 BR overlap; road continues as 2nd Street
1.000 mi = 1.609 km; 1.000 km = 0.621 mi: Concurrency terminus

== S18 ==
County Road S18
- Location: Orange County
- Length: 29.05 mi (46.75 km)
- Existed: 1970–present

County Route S18 (CR S18) is a county highway in Orange County, California, United States. The route follows El Toro Road and Santiago Canyon Road which proceeds in a boomerang-like pattern from State Route 133 in Laguna Beach to State Route 55 near Orange. CR S18 traverses as a loop around the urban areas of Orange County and cuts through the Santa Ana Mountains. The road is one of four county routes in Orange County that are signed in areas nearby the route, such as southbound Interstate 5 and northbound State Route 133. It is also noted to be the longest county route in Orange County and is the only major route that allows motorists to drive through, in, and out of the Santa Ana Mountains.

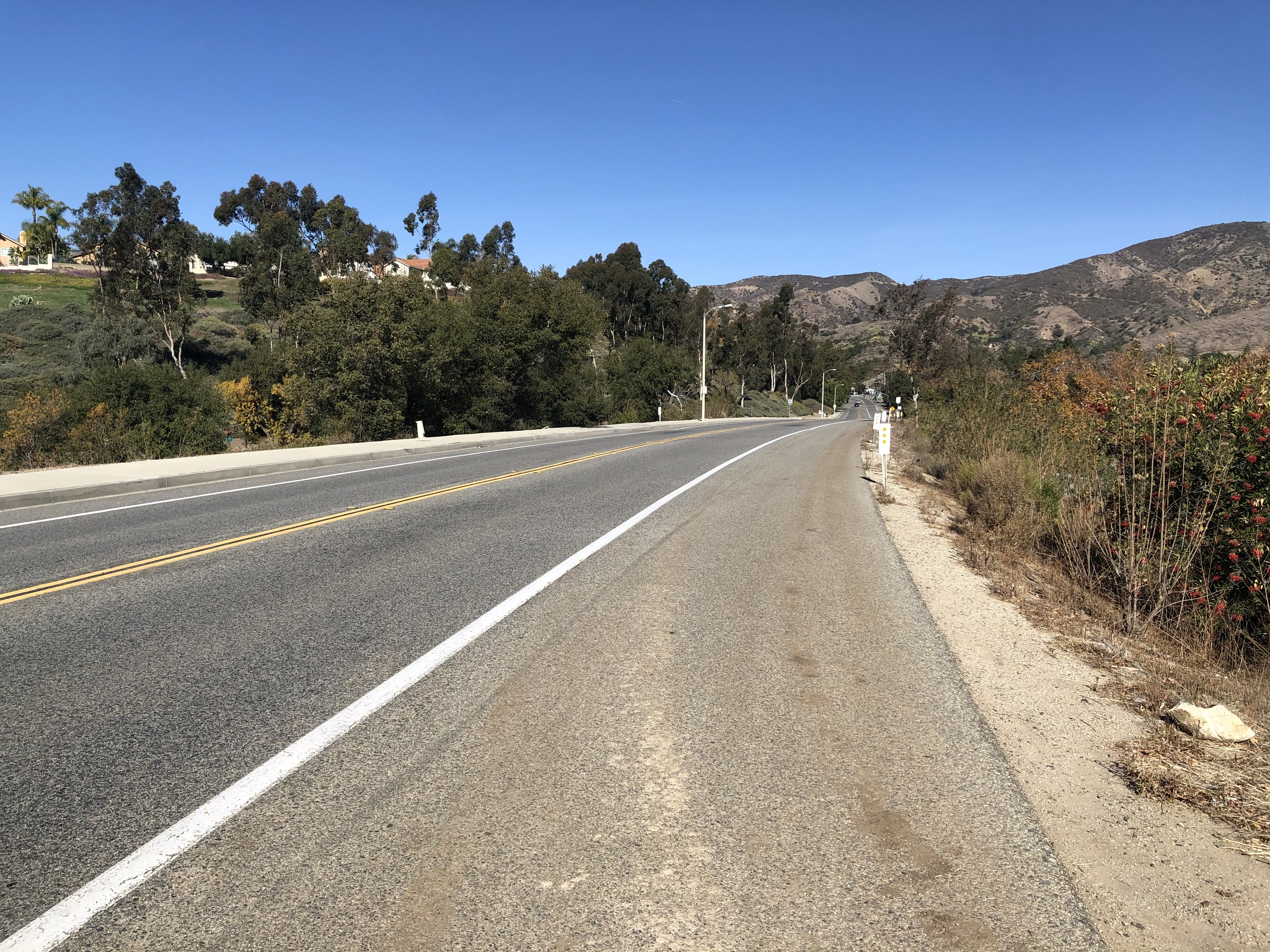
El Toro Road near Portola Hills looking eastward towards Santiago Canyon

The Santiago Canyon Road portion of CR S18 in the Santa Ana Mountains is planned to become designated as an official scenic highway as part of the State Scenic Highway System. This makes it the second highway to become designated as a scenic road in Orange County, California, despite the impact from the Santiago Fire as part of the wildfires in October 2007.

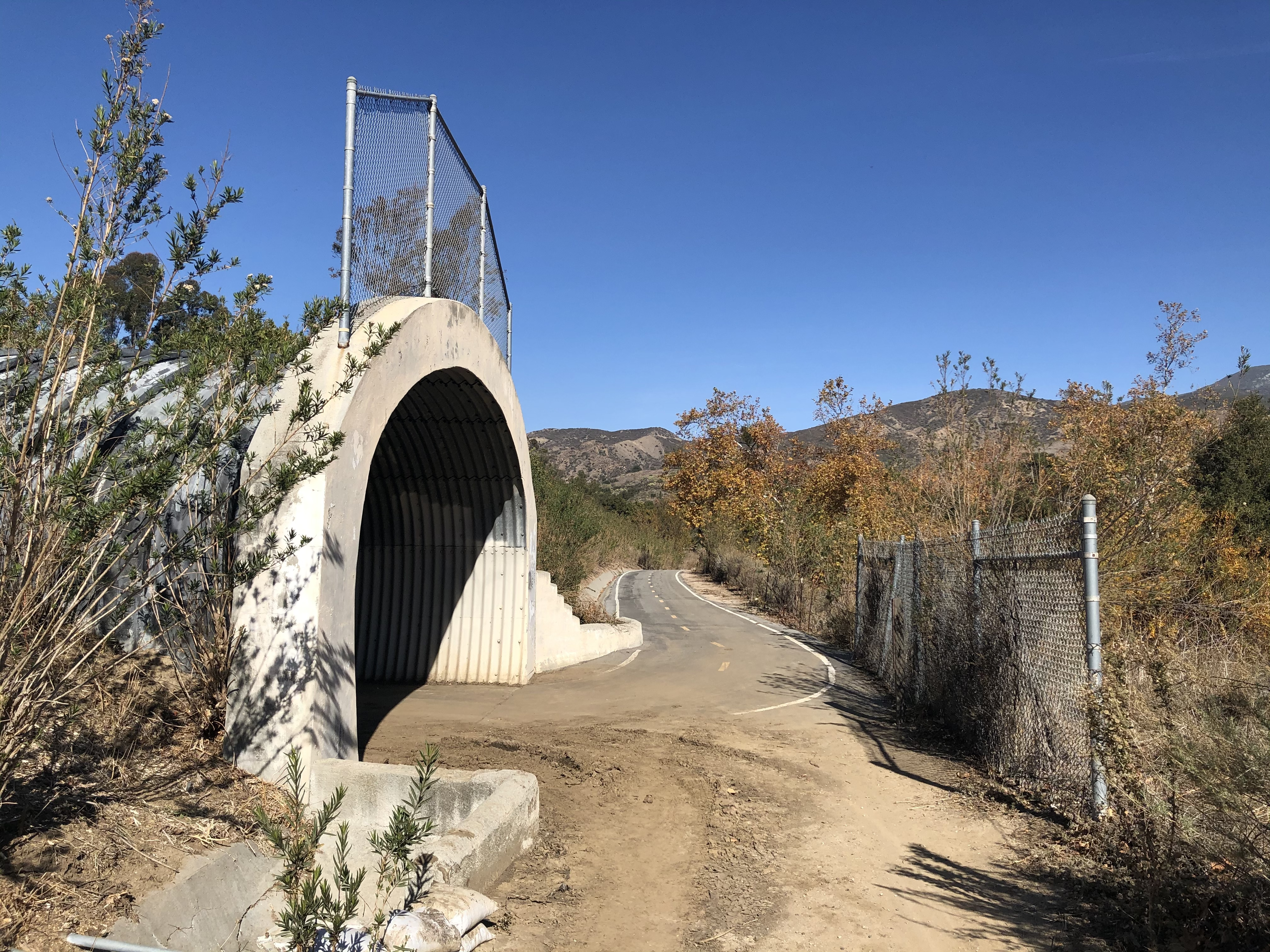
Narrowed trail that connects to the old El Toro Road and passes under the current road

Major intersections

The entire route is in Orange County.

Location	mi	km	Destinations	Notes
Laguna Beach	0.00	0.00	SR 133 (Laguna Canyon Road) – Laguna Beach, Irvine	
Aliso Viejo–Laguna Beach line	0.80	1.29	SR 73 Toll (San Joaquin Hills Toll Road) – Long Beach, San Diego	Interchange; SR 73 north exit 6, south exit 7
Aliso Viejo–Laguna Beach line	1.45	2.33	Aliso Creek Road	
Laguna Woods	3.03	4.88	Moulton Parkway	
Laguna Woods–Lake Forest line	4.14	6.66	I-5 (San Diego Freeway) – Los Angeles, San Diego	El Toro Interchange; I-5 exit 91; former US 101
Lake Forest	6.35	10.22	Trabuco Road	
Lake Forest	8.75	14.08	Santa Margarita Parkway, Portola Parkway	
	11.53	18.56	CR S19 east (Live Oak Canyon Road) – Trabuco Canyon, Coto de Caza	
			Silverado Canyon Road – Silverado Canyon, Black Star Canyon	
	22.82	36.73	SR 241 Toll / SR 261 Toll south (Eastern Toll Road) – Riverside, Irvine, South County	Interchange
Orange	23.83	38.35	CR S25 west (Chapman Avenue) / Jamboree Road	
Orange	29.05	46.75	SR 55 (Costa Mesa Freeway) – Newport Beach, Riverside	Interchange; SR 55 exit 15
Orange	29.05	46.75	Katella Avenue	Continuation beyond SR 55
1.000 mi = 1.609 km; 1.000 km = 0.621 mi

== S19 ==
County Road S19
- Location: Orange County
- Length: 3.3 mi (5.3 km)
- Existed: 1961–present

County Route S19 (CR S19) is a county highway in the U.S. state of California in Orange County. The route follows Live Oak Canyon Road from O'Neill Park to El Toro Road (S18) to Trabuco Canyon.

County Route S19 is notorious for many fatal accidents that have occurred in the recent years since 2000, and many lost lives due to such accidents.

The route was established in 1961.

Major intersections

The entire route is in Orange County.

Location	mi	km	Destinations	Notes
Lake Forest	0.0	0.0	CR S18 (Santiago Canyon Road, El Toro Road) – Laguna Beach, Orange	Western terminus
	0.5	0.80	Ranch Road	
	1.1	1.8	Hamilton Trail	
	1.3	2.1	Hunky Dory Lane	
	1.4	2.3	Lambrose Canyon Road	
	1.7	2.7	Canyon Creek Drive	
	1.8	2.9	Shelter Canyon Road	
	2.0	3.2	Monastery Road	
	3.3	5.3	O'Neill Regional Park	Eastern terminus; road continues as Trabuco Canyon Road
1.000 mi = 1.609 km; 1.000 km = 0.621 mi

== S20 ==
County Road S20
- Location: Santa Barbara County
- Existed: ?–1988

County Route S20 (CR S20) was a county highway in the U.S. state of California. As the only county route in Santa Barbara County at the time, it was merged with State Route 1 in 1988, rerouting SR 1 from Harris Grade Road to the former county route leading into Vandenberg Air Force Base.

== S21 ==
County Road S21
- Location: San Diego–Oceanside
- Length: 25.0 mi (40.2 km)
- Existed: 1968–present

County Route S21 (CR S21) is a south–north running road serving the coastal communities of northern San Diego County, California, United States, running from San Diego in the south to Oceanside in the north. The route is signed in many places as "Historic Route 101" with the official Historic U.S. 101 shields. CR S21 follows the prior alignment of U.S. Route 101 through this region. The route is also called "Coast Highway" in some places as well. This route was originally designated in 1968 and is 24.74 miles (39.82 km) long.

Historic US 101

Route description

County Route S21 begins at Interstate 5 in the north of San Diego as Genesee Avenue. After proceeding west-northwest for 3/4 mile (1.2 km) it intersects Torrey Pines Road and continues north with that name, providing access to Torrey Pines State Natural Reserve. The road then travels north into Del Mar, where it is renamed "Camino Del Mar". While in Del Mar the route passes both the historic Del Mar Racetrack and through the historic downtown of Del Mar. In Solana Beach the route moves closer to the coast. Along this stretch, it is named "Highway 101" and the city has signed the route along its length with faux U.S. Highway shields that resemble the official U.S. 101 shields in use today along with the state issued Historic 101 shield. While to the north in Encinitas the route's name becomes "Coast Highway 101" also in homage to the old U.S. Route. In Carlsbad it becomes "Carlsbad Boulevard”. The route is named "Coast Highway" in Oceanside, and comes to an end at Interstate 5 just south of Camp Pendleton.

The section of this road between La Costa Avenue and Palomar Airport Road was once known as the Oceanside-Carlsbad Freeway. The majority of the route from the Del Mar city limits to State Route 76 in Oceanside is signed as Historic U.S. 101, and is also an unsigned Business Route Interstate 5.

Major intersections

The entire route is in San Diego County.

Location	mi	km	Destinations	Notes
San Diego	0.0	0.0	I-5 (San Diego Freeway) / Genesee Avenue south	Interchange; southern terminus; I-5 exit 29
San Diego	3.7	6.0	Torrey Pines State Natural Reserve	
Del Mar	6.2	10.0	Jimmy Durante Boulevard to I-5 – Fairgrounds	Interchange; northbound exit and southbound entrance
Del Mar–Solana Beach line	7.4	11.9	CR S6 east (Via de la Valle) – Rancho Santa Fe, Escondido	Western terminus of CR S6
Solana Beach	8.2	13.2	CR S8 east (Lomas Santa Fe Drive)	Western terminus of CR S8
Encinitas	12.4	20.0	CR S9 east (Encinitas Boulevard)	Western terminus of CR S9
Carlsbad	17.9	28.8	CR S12 east (Palomar Airport Road)	Interchange; western terminus of CR S12
Oceanside	21.9	35.2	Vista Way to SR 78 east	Access to SR 78 via eastbound Vista Way
Oceanside	24.3	39.1	SR 76 east (San Luis Rey Mission Expressway) to I-5	Western terminus of SR 76
Oceanside	25.0	40.2	I-5 (San Diego Freeway) / Harbor Drive	Interchange; northern terminus; I-5 exit 54C
1.000 mi = 1.609 km; 1.000 km = 0.621 mi: Incomplete access

== S22 ==
County Road S22
- Location: San Diego – Imperial Counties

County Route S22 (CR S22) is a county highway in San Diego and Imperial counties in California, United States. It runs from San Felipe Road (County Route S2) west of Ranchita to State Route 86 in Salton City. The route is known as Montezuma Valley Road, Palm Canyon Drive, Christmas Circle, Peg Leg Road, and Borrego Salton Sea Way.

Route description

The route begins at a junction with County Route S2 (San Felipe Road) in San Diego County and runs eastward as Montezuma Valley Road through the rural community of Ranchita. It enters Anza-Borrego Desert State Park and then descends for approximately 12 miles (19 km) to the desert community of Borrego Springs, offering magnificent views of the Borrego Valley as it winds steeply down Montezuma Grade.

As it enters Borrego Springs, the highway turns right onto Palm Canyon Drive. In the middle of Borrego Springs, it passes through Christmas Circle, the only large traffic circle in San Diego County.

It continues east, turns north onto Peg Leg Road, and turns east again onto Borrego Salton Sea Way. CR S22 enters Imperial County, runs through Anza-Borrego Desert State Park again and ends at a junction with State Route 86 in Salton City, a community on the shore of the Salton Sea.

The route was established in 1968.

Major intersections

County	Location	mi	km	Destinations	Notes
San Diego				CR S2 (San Felipe Road) to SR 78 / SR 79 – Santa Ysabel	Western terminus
San Diego	Borrego Springs			Palm Canyon Drive west, Hoberg Road – Anza-Borrego Park Headquarters	East end of Montezuma Valley Road; west end of Palm Canyon Drive (first segment) on CR S22
San Diego	Borrego Springs			East end of Palm Canyon Drive (first segment) on CR S22; west end of Christmas Circle on CR S22	
San Diego	Borrego Springs			CR S3 south (Borrego Springs Road) – Julian	Roundabout; northern terminus of CR S3
San Diego	Borrego Springs			East end of Christmas Circle on CR S22; west end of Palm Canyon Drive (second segment) on CR S22	
San Diego				Borrego Valley Road – Julian	
San Diego				Old Springs Road	East end of Palm Canyon Drive (second segment); west end of Peg Leg Road
San Diego				Henderson Canyon Road	East end of Peg Leg Road; west end of Borrego Salton Sea Way
Imperial	Salton City			SR 86 – El Centro, Indio	Eastern terminus; road continues as South Marina Drive
1.000 mi = 1.609 km; 1.000 km = 0.621 mi

== S24 ==
County Road S24
- Location: Imperial County

County Route S24 (CR S24) is a county highway in southeast Imperial County, California, United States. It is north of, across the Colorado River and adjacent to Yuma, Arizona, serving the community of Winterhaven. The southern two-thirds of the route travels through the Quechan Indian Tribal lands of the Fort Yuma Indian Reservation.

Route description

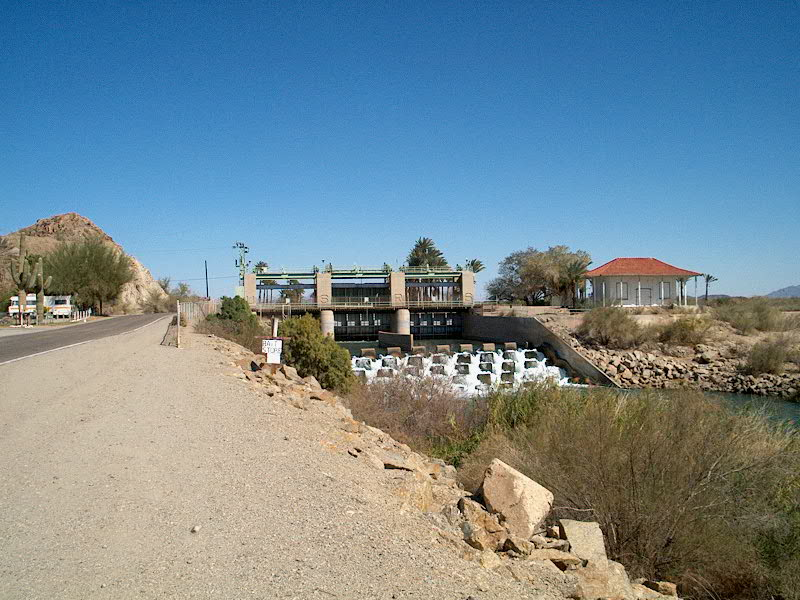
Route S24 and the Colorado River on right.

The route begins from Winterhaven, adjacent to the eastern exit of Interstate 8 at Winterhaven. The route travels northeast through portions of eastern Winterhaven, then immediately turns north through farmland, for 2.8 miles (5 km); (the continuation north exiting this route accesses the southern Chocolate Mountains, the western perimeter of the Little Picacho Wilderness, and Picacho State Recreation Area, a dirt road, sometimes rugged, wash-boarded and difficult). The route turns east 3.5 miles (6 km) past Ross Corner, then north, east, then north on a newly paved stretch through farmland in the Bard area for 1.5 miles (2 km). The final turn east is through farmland for 1.3 miles (2 km) then a northeast stretch along the western shoreline of the Colorado River, Laguna Dam and a terminus at the 1.1 mi (1.8 km) turn-off to Imperial Dam; the river stretch is about 8.0 miles (13 km), and seasonally has osprey, phainopepla, Abert's towhee, belted kingfisher, double-crested cormorant, and everpresent Gambel's quail, plus numerous other bird species, including the water birds. Of note, the osprey have snag perches along the river route, and can be seen eating fish on pole tops, towers, etc.

The terminus at the Laguna Dam turn-off transitions into the extension westwards in southwest Arizona from U.S. 95 in Arizona, westwards on Imperial Dam Road of Yuma County, Arizona and the US Army Yuma Proving Ground.

No traffic lights occur on the route. Only one stop sign is encountered while traveling north to south; that one 4-way stop is encountered at about 1.7 miles north of Winterhaven. 1.5 miles (2.4 km) south of the Imperial Dam entrance, the Ferguson Lake Road and the Senator Wash access exits to the northwest. The eastern access points to the Little Picacho Wilderness can be found along the northern sections of Ferguson Lake Road (a sometimes rugged, wash-boarded dirt road).

The route was established in 1970.

CR S24 serves as a second access route to the Yuma Proving Ground, and also to the main housing and administration center of YPG. The route is also the main access to the housing facilities in the Imperial Dam region, administered by the Bureau of Land Management; the Imperial Dam housing region is on the Arizona side of the Colorado River.

Major intersections

The entire route is in Imperial County.

Location	mi	km	Destinations	Notes
Fort Yuma Indian Reservation			I-8 BL (Winterhaven Drive)	Southern terminus; former US 80 west; connects to I-8
Fort Yuma Indian Reservation			Quechan Road	Former US 80 east
Fort Yuma Indian Reservation			Picacho Road north	North end of Picacho Road on CR S24; west end of Ross Road
Bard			Ross Road east	East end of Ross Road on CR S24; south end of Bard Road
Bard			Colby Road west	North end of Bard Road; west end of Colby Road on CR S24
Bard			Colby Road east	East end of Colby Road on CR S24; south end of York Road
			York Road north	North end of York Road on CR S24; west end of 11th Street
Potholes			Levee Road	East end of 11th Street; south end of Imperial Dam Road
			California–Arizona state line Northern terminus; road continues into Arizona as Imperial Dam Road	
1.000 mi = 1.609 km; 1.000 km = 0.621 mi

== S25 ==
County Road S25
- Location: Orange County
- Length: 4.5 mi (7.2 km)
- Existed: 1970–present

County Route S25 (CR S25), commonly known as Chapman Avenue, is a 4.5 mile stretch of road in Orange, California, United States, that primarily travels east-west. The western terminus of the route is at an interchange with State Route 55, which leads to the remainder of Chapman Avenue, a street that bisects Old Towne Orange and travels all the way to the Anaheim Resort district. The eastern terminus is in the more rural Orange Park Acres neighborhood near Santiago Canyon College and connects to County Route S18, known as Santiago Canyon Road.

CR S25 was formerly a part of LRN 182, a route designated in 1933.

Major intersections

The entire route is in Orange County.

Location	mi	km	Destinations	Notes
Orange	0.0	0.0	Chapman Avenue	Continuation beyond SR 55
Orange	0.0	0.0	SR 55 (Costa Mesa Freeway) to SR 22 – Newport Beach, Anaheim	Western terminus; access to SR 22 via SR 55 south
Orange	0.9	1.4	Prospect Street	
	1.37	2.20	Esplanade Street	
Orange	1.6	2.6	Hewes Street	
Orange	2.2	3.5	Crawford Canyon Road, Cannon Street	
Orange	3.8	6.1	Newport Boulevard	
Orange	4.5	7.2	CR S18 north (Jamboree Road)	Eastern terminus; serves Irvine Park, Orange County Zoo
Orange	4.5	7.2	CR S18 south (Santiago Canyon Road) to SR 241 Toll / SR 261 Toll – Irvine, Laguna Beach	Continuation beyond Jamboree Road, access to SR 241 and SR 261 toll roads via CR S-18 south
1.000 mi = 1.609 km; 1.000 km = 0.621 mi

== S26 ==
County Road S26
- Location: Imperial County

County Route S26 (CR S26) is a county highway in Imperial County, California, United States. It runs from State Route 78 / State Route 86 in Westmorland to State Route 115 northeast of Brawley. Portions of the route are known as Borats Road, Kalin Road and Rutherford Road.

Major intersections

The entire route is in Imperial County.

Location	mi	km	Destinations	Notes
Westmorland			SR 78 / SR 86 (East Main Street)	Western terminus; former US 99
			Borats Road east, Kalin Road south	East end of Borats Road on CR S26; west end of Kalin Road on CR S26
			Kalin Road north	East end of Kalin Road on CR S26; west end of Rutherford Road
			SR 111	
			SR 115 – Holtville, Calipatria	Eastern terminus; road continues east as Rutherford Road
1.000 mi = 1.609 km; 1.000 km = 0.621 mi

== S27 ==
County Road S27
- Location: Imperial County

County Route S27 (CR S27) is a county highway in Imperial County, California, United States. It runs from Forrester Road (CR S30) to Highline Road (CR S33). Most of the route is known as Keystone Road, with a small portion of McConnell Road connecting the two segments of Keystone Road.

Major intersections

The entire route is in Imperial County.

Location	mi	km	Destinations	Notes
			CR S30 (Forrester Road)	Western terminus
			SR 86	Former US 99
			CR S31 (Dogwood Road)	
			Old Highway 111	Former SR 111
			SR 111 – Imperial, Brawley	
			McConnell Road south	East end of Keystone Road (first segment); west end of McConnell Road on CR S27
			McConnell Road north	East end of McConnell Road on CR S27; west end of Keystone Road (second segment)
			SR 115	
			CR S32 (Holt Road)	
			CR S33 (Highline Road)	Eastern terminus
1.000 mi = 1.609 km; 1.000 km = 0.621 mi

== S28 ==
County Road S28
- Location: Imperial County

County Route S28 (CR S28) is a county highway in Imperial County, California, United States. It runs from Forrester Road (CR S30) to Holt Road (CR S32). Most of the route is known as Worthington Road, while the portion within the city of Imperial is known as Barioni Boulevard.

Major intersections

The entire route is in Imperial County.

Location	mi	km	Destinations	Notes
			CR S30 (Forrester Road)	Western terminus; road continues west as Worthington Road
Imperial			East end of Worthington Road (first segment); west end of Barioni Boulevard	
Imperial			SR 86	Former US 99
			East end of Barioni Boulevard; west end of Worthington Road (second segment)	
			CR S31 (Dogwood Road)	
			Old Highway 111	Former SR 111
			SR 111 – Calexico, Brawley	
			SR 115	
			CR S32 (Holt Road)	Eastern terminus
1.000 mi = 1.609 km; 1.000 km = 0.621 mi

== S29 ==
County Road S29
- Drew Road
- Location: Imperial County

County Route S29 (CR S29), known entirely as Drew Road, is a county highway in Imperial County, California, United States. It runs from State Route 98 west of Mount Signal and north of the U.S.-Mexico border to Evan Hewes Highway (CR S80) in Seeley.

Major intersections

The entire route is in Imperial County.

Location	mi	km	Destinations	Notes
			SR 98	Southern terminus
			I-8 – El Centro, San Diego	Interchange; I-8 exit 107
Seeley			CR S80 (Evan Hewes Highway) – Naval Air Facility El Centro	Northern terminus; former US 80; road continues north as Haskell Road
1.000 mi = 1.609 km; 1.000 km = 0.621 mi

== S30 ==
County Road S30
- Location: Imperial County

County Route S30 (CR S30) is a county highway in Imperial County, California, United States. It runs from State Route 98 in Mount Signal, north of the U.S.-Mexico border, to Sorenson Avenue (State Route 111) in Calipatria. The route is known as Brockman Road, McCabe Road, Forrester Road, Center Street in Westmorland, Walker Road, Gentry Road, Eddins Road, and Main Street in Calipatria.

Major intersections

The entire route is in Imperial County.

Location	mi	km	Destinations	Notes
Mount Signal			SR 98	Southern terminus; road continues south as Brockman Road
			Brockman Road north, McCabe Road west	North end of Brockman Road on CR S30; south end of McCabe Road on CR S30
			McCabe Road east, Forrester Road south	North end of McCabe Road on CR S30; south end of Forrester Road (first segment) on CR S30
			I-8 – El Centro, San Diego	Interchange; I-8 exit 111
			CR S80 (Evan Hewes Highway) – El Centro, NAF El Centro	Former US 80
			CR S28 (Worthington Road) – Imperial	
			CR S27 (Keystone Road)	
Westmorland			Baughman Road	North end of Forrester Road (first segment); south end of South Center Street
Westmorland			SR 78 / SR 86 (Main Street) – Brawley, Indio	North end of South Center Street; south end of North Center Street
Westmorland			8th Street	North end of North Center Street; south end of Forrester Road (second segment)
			Walker Road west	North end of Forrester Road (second segment); south end of Walker Road on CR S30
			Walker Road east	North end of Walker Road on CR S30; south end of Gentry Road
			Gentry Road north, Eddins Road west	North end of Gentry Road on CR S30; south end of Eddins Road on CR S30
Calipatria			Lyerly Road	North end of Eddins Road; south end of Main Street
Calipatria			SR 111 (Sorenson Avenue)	Northern terminus
Calipatria			SR 115 south (Main Street) – Holtville	Continuation beyond SR 111
1.000 mi = 1.609 km; 1.000 km = 0.621 mi

== S31 ==
County Road S31
- Location: Imperial County

County Route S31 (CR S31) is a county highway in Imperial County, California, United States. It runs from State Route 98 near Calexico, north of the U.S.-Mexico border, to Main Street (former State Route 78) in Brawley. Most of the route is known as Dogwood Road (although it is sometimes signed as Dogwood Avenue in El Centro). In Brawley, it is known as Imperial Avenue and Plaza Street.

Major intersections

The entire route is in Imperial County.

Location	mi	km	Destinations	Notes
			SR 98 (Birch Street)	Southern terminus
Heber			SR 86 (Heber Road)	Former US 99
El Centro			Danenberg Drive	
El Centro			I-8	Interchange; I-8 exit 116
El Centro			CR S80 (Main Street)	Former US 80
Imperial			Aten Road	
			CR S28 (Worthington Road)	
			CR S27 (Keystone Road)	
Brawley			North end of Dogwood Road; south end of South Imperial Avenue	
Brawley			K Street	
Brawley			North end of South Imperial Avenue; south end of South Plaza Street	
Brawley			Main Street	Northern terminus; former SR 78; road continues north as North Plaza Street
1.000 mi = 1.609 km; 1.000 km = 0.621 mi

== S32 ==
County Road S32
- Location: Imperial County

County Route S32 (CR S32) is a county highway in Imperial County, California, United States. It runs from Interstate 8 and State Route 7 south of Holtville to State Route 78 east of Brawley. The route is known as Orchard Road, Holt Road, and small segments of Gonder Road and Butters Road. In Holtville, it is known as Cedar Avenue and Holt Avenue.

Major intersections

The entire route is in Imperial County.

Location	mi	km	Destinations	Notes
			SR 7 south	Continuation beyond I-8
			I-8 – San Diego, Yuma	Interchange; southern terminus; I-8 exit 125
Holtville			4th Street	North end of Orchard Road; south end of Cedar Avenue
Holtville			SR 115 north (5th Street) / Cedar Avenue north	South end of SR 115 overlap; former US 80 west; north end of Cedar Avenue on CR S32
Holtville			SR 115 south (5th Street) / Holt Avenue south	North end of SR 115 overlap; former US 80 east; south end of Holt Avenue on CR S32
Holtville			Underwood Road	North end of Holt Avenue; south end of Holt Road
			CR S28 west (Worthington Road)	
			CR S27 (Keystone Road)	
			Gonder Road west	North end of Holt Road; south end of Gonder Road on CR S32
			Gonder Road east	North end of Gonder Road on CR S32; south end of Butters Road
			SR 78 – Blythe, Brawley	Northern terminus; road continues north as Butters Road
1.000 mi = 1.609 km; 1.000 km = 0.621 mi: Concurrency terminus

== S33 ==
County Road S33
- Location: Imperial County

County Route S33 (CR S33) is a county highway in Imperial County, California, United States. It runs from State Route 98 east of Bonds Corner, north of the U.S.-Mexico border, to State Route 78 east of Brawley. The route is known as Bonesteele Road, Kumberg Road, Miller Road, Kavanaugh Road, Highline Road, Gonder Road, and Green Road.

Major intersections

The entire route is in Imperial County.

Location	mi	km	Destinations	Notes
			SR 98	Southern terminus
			Kumberg Road west	North end of Bonesteele Road; south end of Kumberg Road on CR S33
			Kumberg Road east	North end of Kumberg Road on CR S33; south end of Miller Road
			Verde School Road	
			SR 115	Former US 80
			Kavanaugh Road east	North end of Miller Road; south end of Kavanaugh Road on CR S33
			Kavanaugh Road west	North end of Kavanaugh Road on CR S33; south end of Highline Road
			CR S27 west (Keystone Road)	
			Highline Road north, Gonder Road east	North end of Highline Road on CR S33; south end of Gonder Road on CR S33
			Gonder Road west	North end of Gonder Road on CR S33; south end of Green Road
			SR 78	Northern terminus; road continues north as Green Road
1.000 mi = 1.609 km; 1.000 km = 0.621 mi

== S34 ==
County Road S34
- Ogilby Road
- Location: Imperial County

County Route S34 (CR S34), known entirely as Ogilby Road, is a county highway in Imperial County, California, United States. It runs from Interstate 8 near Felicity and west of Yuma, Arizona to the State Route 78 portion between Blythe and Brawley. Located in the Yuma Desert and close to the Algodones Dunes, the road also goes through the ghost town of Ogilby.

Major intersections

The entire route is in Imperial County.

Location	mi	km	Destinations	Notes
			I-8 – Yuma, El Centro	Interchange; southern terminus; I-8 exit 159; road continues south as Ogilby Road
			Frontage Road	Former US 80
			SR 78 – Palo Verde, Glamis	Northern terminus
1.000 mi = 1.609 km; 1.000 km = 0.621 mi

== S78 ==
County Road S78
- Location: Imperial County

County Route S78 (CR S78) was a county highway in Imperial County, California, United States. It is the former routing of the present-day State Route 78 portion between the south junction of State Route 115 and the small community of Palo Verde.

== S80 ==
County Road S80
- Location: Imperial County
- Length: 34.46 mi (55.46 km)

County Route S80 (CR S80) is a county highway in Imperial County, California, United States. It was once a portion of U.S. Route 80, which no longer enters the state. CR S80 travels through Imperial County for 34.46 miles (55.46 km) to the vicinity of the Colorado River near Yuma, Arizona. Most of the route is known as Evan Hewes Highway, while the portion of the route within El Centro is known as Adams Avenue, 4th Street, and Main Street.

Route description

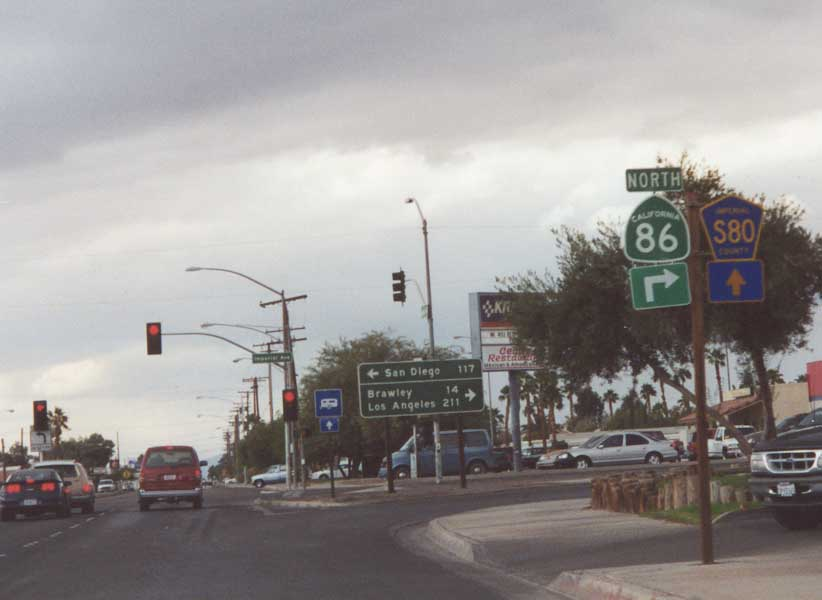
S80 looking west at the SR 86 split in El Centro

CR S80 begins in the west at the junction of CR S2 (Imperial Highway) as the Evan Hewes Highway roughly paralleling the routing of Interstate 8. This portion of the highway travels 25 miles (40 km) east through Plaster City, Dixieland and Seeley to El Centro.

In downtown El Centro, CR S80 becomes Adams Avenue. At Imperial Avenue, CR S80 junctions with State Route 86 from the north and Business Loop I-8 from the south. The roads run concurrent down Adams Avenue, and all three turn south along 4th Street. CR S80 then turns to the east along Main Street which takes it out of El Centro while SR 86 and Business I-8 continue south. Outside of El Centro after its junction with CR S31 (Dogwood Road), CR S80 resumes the designation of Evan Hewes Highway. CR S80 also intersects State Route 111 along this stretch. S80 continues east until it reaches its terminus at the junction with State Route 115. State Route 115 continues along the Evan Hewes Highway and old U.S. Route 80.

History

U.S. Route 80 was deleted from California legislatively in 1964, though it would be another ten years before all the U.S. Highway signage was removed from the route. CR S80 was defined in 1973 shortly before the last Route 80 signs had been taken down.

In 2006, the California legislature, as part of concurrent resolution ACR 123, made the former Route 80, including County Route S80, an official historic route.

For the short distance CR S80 runs concurrent with SR 86, it is part of the Juan Bautista de Anza National Historic Trail. This trail runs along the route Juan Bautista de Anza took along his expedition into California from 1775–76.

Evan Hewes was the former superintendent of the Imperial Irrigation District.

Major intersections

The entire route is in Imperial County.

Location	mi	km	Destinations	Notes
Ocotillo			Evan Hewes Highway	Continuation beyond CR S2; former US 80 west
Ocotillo			CR S2 (Imperial Highway) to SR 78	Western terminus; connects to I-8
			Dunaway Road to I-8	
Seeley			CR S29 (Drew Road) to I-8 / Haskell Road	Northern terminus of CR S29
			CR S30 (Forrester Road) to I-8 – Westmorland	
El Centro			East end of Evan Hewes Highway (first segment); west end of Adams Avenue	
El Centro			La Brucherie Road	
El Centro			SR 86 north / I-8 BL west (Imperial Avenue) to I-8 – Brawley, Los Angeles, San Diego	West end of SR 86 / I-8 Bus. overlap; former US 99 north
El Centro			8th Street	
El Centro			Adams Avenue east	East end of Adams Avenue on CR S80; west end of 4th Street on CR S80
El Centro			SR 86 south / I-8 BL east (4th Street) / Main Street west – Calexico, San Diego	East end of SR 86 / I-8 Bus. overlap and 4th Street on CR S80; west end of Main Street on CR S80; former US 99 south
El Centro			CR S31 (Dogwood Avenue)	
El Centro			Gillett Street	East end of Main Street; west end of Evan Hewes Highway (second segment)
			Old Highway 111	Former SR 111
			SR 111 to I-8 – Calexico, Brawley	
			Bowker Road	
			SR 115 (Evan Hewes Highway)	Eastern terminus; former US 80 east
1.000 mi = 1.609 km; 1.000 km = 0.621 mi: Concurrency terminus
