= Ranchita, California =

Unincorporated community in California, United States

- Unincorporated community
- Location within California Location within the United States
- Coordinates: 33°12′36″N 116°31′00″W
- Country: United States
- State: California
- County: San Diego
- Elevation: 4,065 ft (1,239 m)
- Time zone: UTC-8 (Pacific (PST))
  - Summer (DST): UTC-7 (PDT)
- ZIP code: 92066
- Area codes: 442 & 760
- GNIS feature ID: 247950

Ranchita (Spanish for "small ranch") is an unincorporated community in San Diego County, California. Ranchita is 9 miles (14 km) southwest of Borrego Springs. Ranchita has a ZIP code of 92066. A notable feature is the Rancheti, an 11-foot-tall (3.35 m), 300-pound (136.08 kg) fiberglass Yeti statue erected on Montezuma Valley Road in December 2007. The statue was featured on the March 4, 2016 installment of Zippy. The Ranchita Historical Society, Inc., a California 501(c)3 Non-profit corporation, https://www.RanchitaHistoricalSociety.org, has been established to continue the vision of the Montezuma Valley Historical Society which transitioned to preserve and document our history for future generations to come.

== History ==
Before present-day Ranchita was founded, it was known as Cañada de la Verruga, a Spanish name meaning "Valley of the Wart" that was used by Spaniards and Native Americans. The area was later known as "Wid Helm's place," named after homesteader William Johnson Helm. Upon his arrival to the area, Helm constructed an adobe house just west of present-day Ranchita. Helm's property was popular with deer hunters who traveled long distances to hunt the area. After Helm vacated the area, land locators from Los Angeles brought in new homesteaders who settled there freely under the Homestead Acts, the informal founding of Ranchita.

The Verruga Post Office was founded in Ranchita on September 22, 1917. Several houses, a mine, and a school opened up around that time as the local population grew. Many of the new residents of the town left within a decade due to a lack of water. The post office was moved to Warner Springs on February 27, 1926.

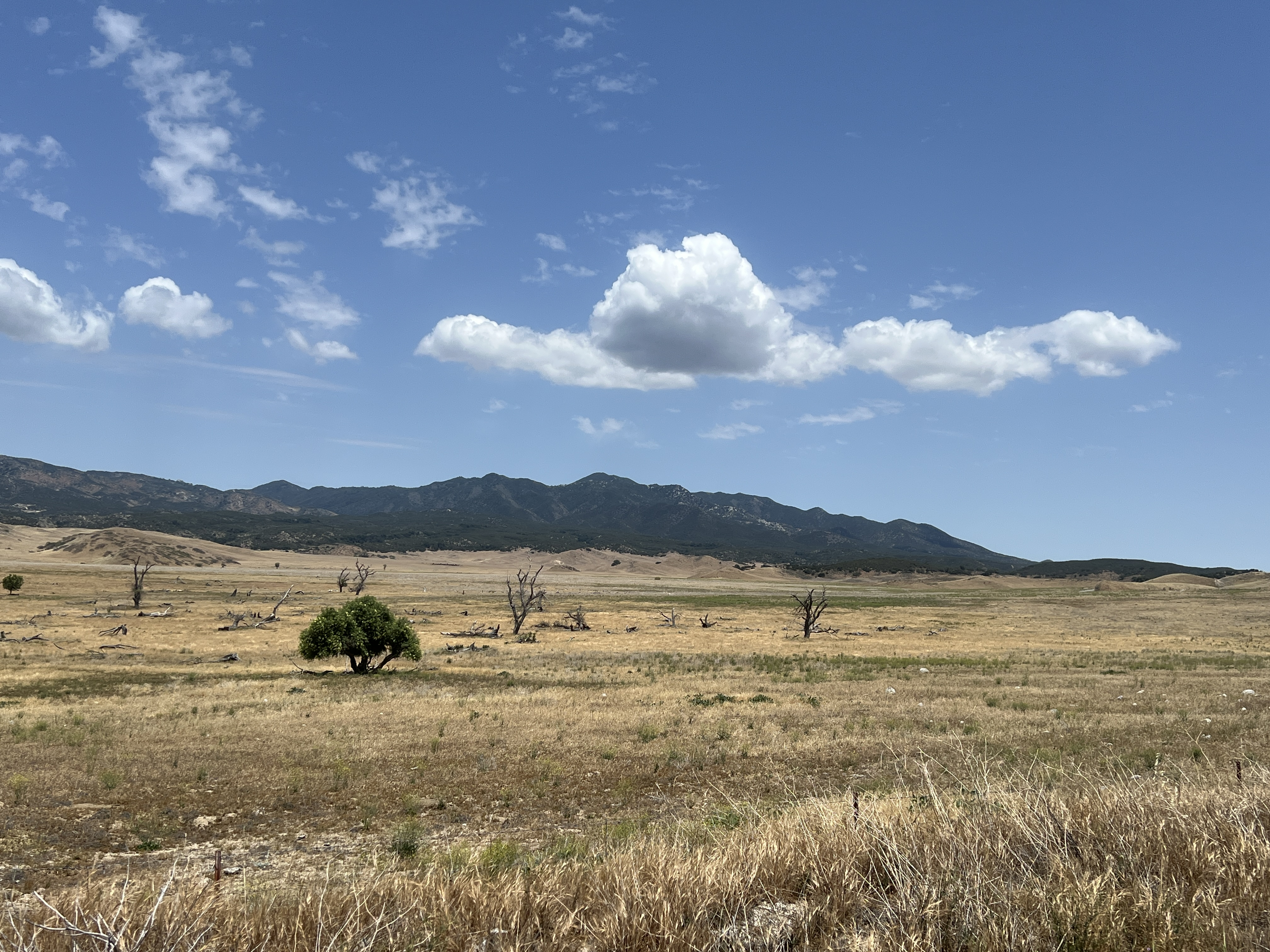
Ranchita landscape looking north from Montezuma Valley Road

There was a longstanding desire to construct a road connecting the town of Borrego Springs in the east to San Felipe, Warner Springs, and other western towns via Ranchita. The road long stood as a mere idea because Hellhole Canyon was an obstacle. The San Diego County Board of Supervisors denied a request to construct the road on April 5, 1937. Crews began construction on the road in 1955 but would not complete the project until 1964. The road was formally opened on June 24, 1964, and was celebrated for shortening the trip from Escondido to Borrego Springs by 14 miles. The highway, County Route S22, is known as Montezuma Valley Road in its stretch through Ranchita.

"The Pines Fire" swept thru this area on August 2, 2002 and devastated many residents and the landscape. The Montezuma Valley Volunteer Fire Department was officially taken over in 2015 when Cal Fire and the County of San Diego built and staffed Fire Station #58.
