= Bard, California =

Unincorporated community in California, United States

Bard
- Unincorporated community
- Location in California Bard (the United States)
- Coordinates: 32°47′21″N 114°33′22″W
- Country: United States
- State: California
- County: Imperial County
- Elevation: 138 ft (42 m)

Bard is an unincorporated community in Imperial County, California, United States, located along County Route S24. It lies at an elevation of 138 feet (42 m). Bard is home to the Imperial Date Gardens.

Bard was created in 1910 after the eastern part of the Fort Yuma Indian Reservation was declared surplus under the Dawes Act. The first post office at Bard opened in 1910 and closed in 1933. The post office was re-established in 1937. Bard's ZIP Code is 92222. The name honors Thomas R. Bard, a promoter of the irrigation district.

== Climate ==
This area has a large amount of sunshine year round due to its stable descending air and high pressure. According to the Köppen Climate Classification system, Bard has a desert climate, abbreviated "BWh" on climate maps.
