= Dixieland, California =

Unincorporated community in California, United States

Dixieland
- Unincorporated community
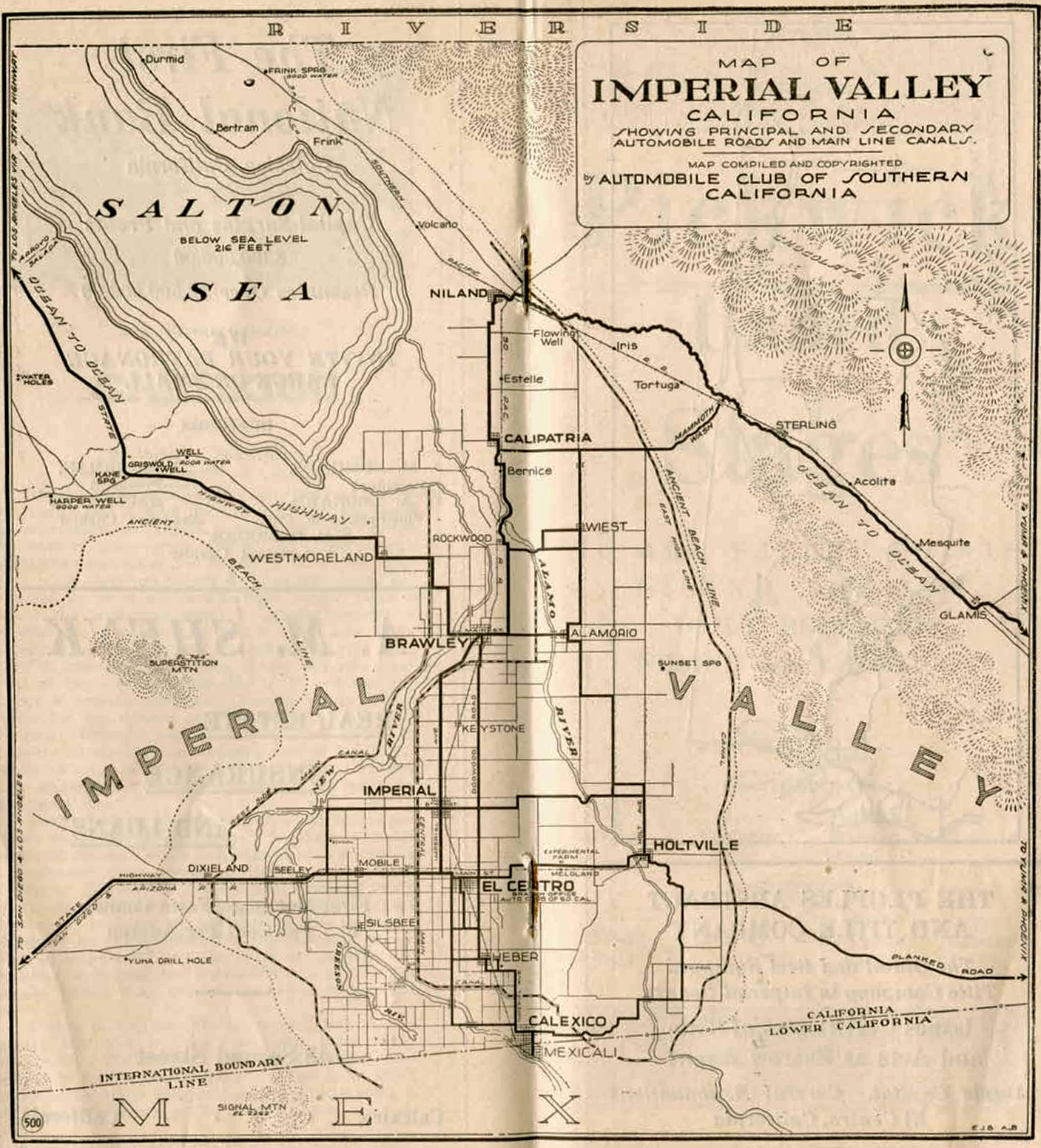
- Dixieland was a stop on the San Diego and Arizona Railroad c. 1915.

- Location in California Dixieland (the United States)
- Coordinates: 32°47′27″N 115°46′13″W
- Country: United States
- State: California
- County: Imperial County
- Elevation: −36 ft (−11 m)

Dixieland is an unincorporated community in Imperial County, California. The name was likely a reference to the Pima cotton fields in the area. It is located 5 miles (8 km) east of Plaster City on County Route S80, at an elevation of 36 feet (11 m) below sea level.

Las Pozas de Santa Rosa de las Lajas (the Wells of Saint Rose of the Flat Rocks), identified by Juan Bautista de Anza on his first expedition into California, were located 6 mi (9.7 km) southwest of Dixieland. Prior to 1912 there was a wagon bridge in the vicinity. The Holton interurban from El Centro stopped at Dixieland in 1912. A post office operated at Dixieland from 1912 to 1935.

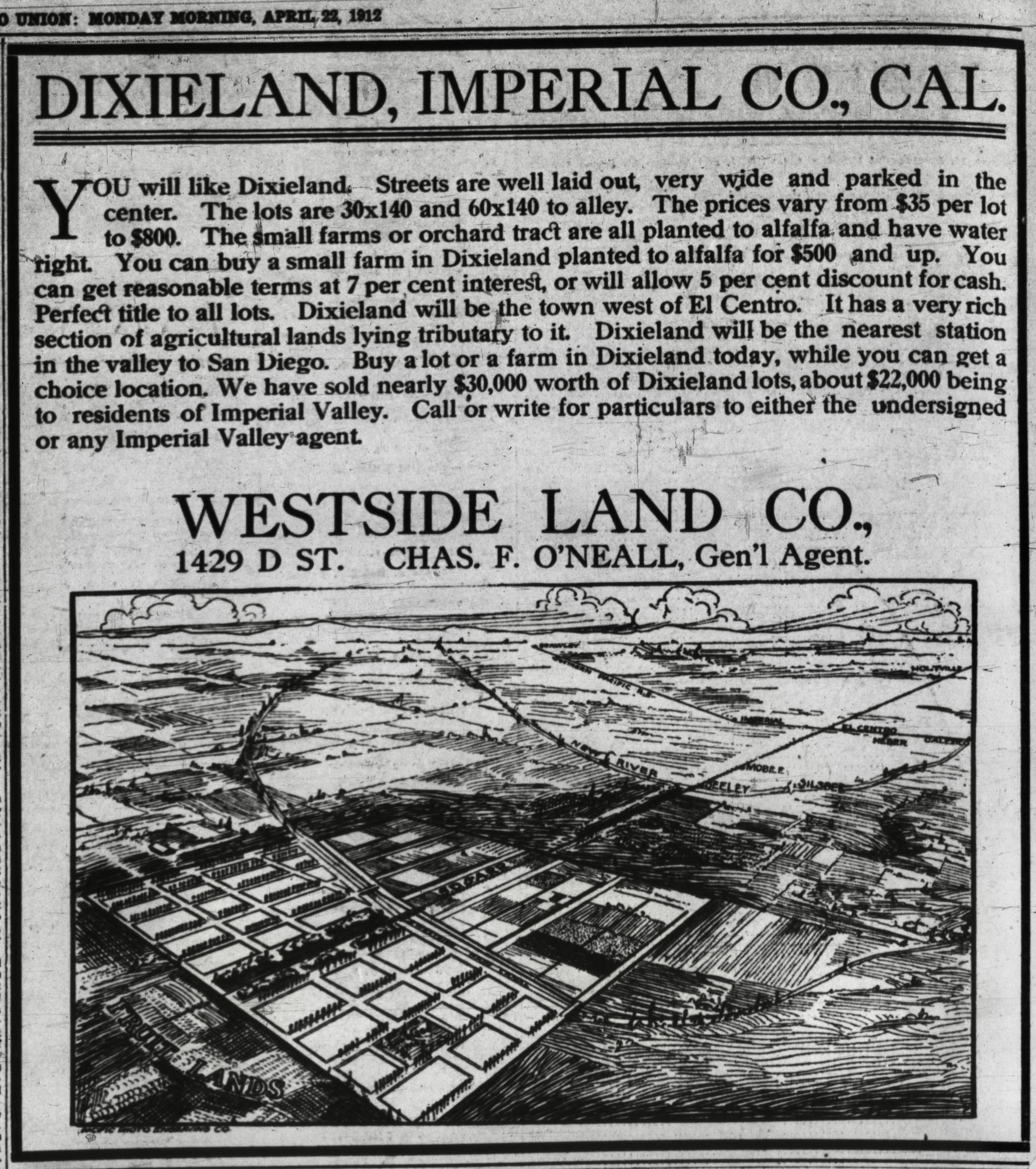
Real estate ad, 1912
