= Fort Yuma Indian Reservation =

Indian reservation in Arizona and California, USA

- Indian reservation
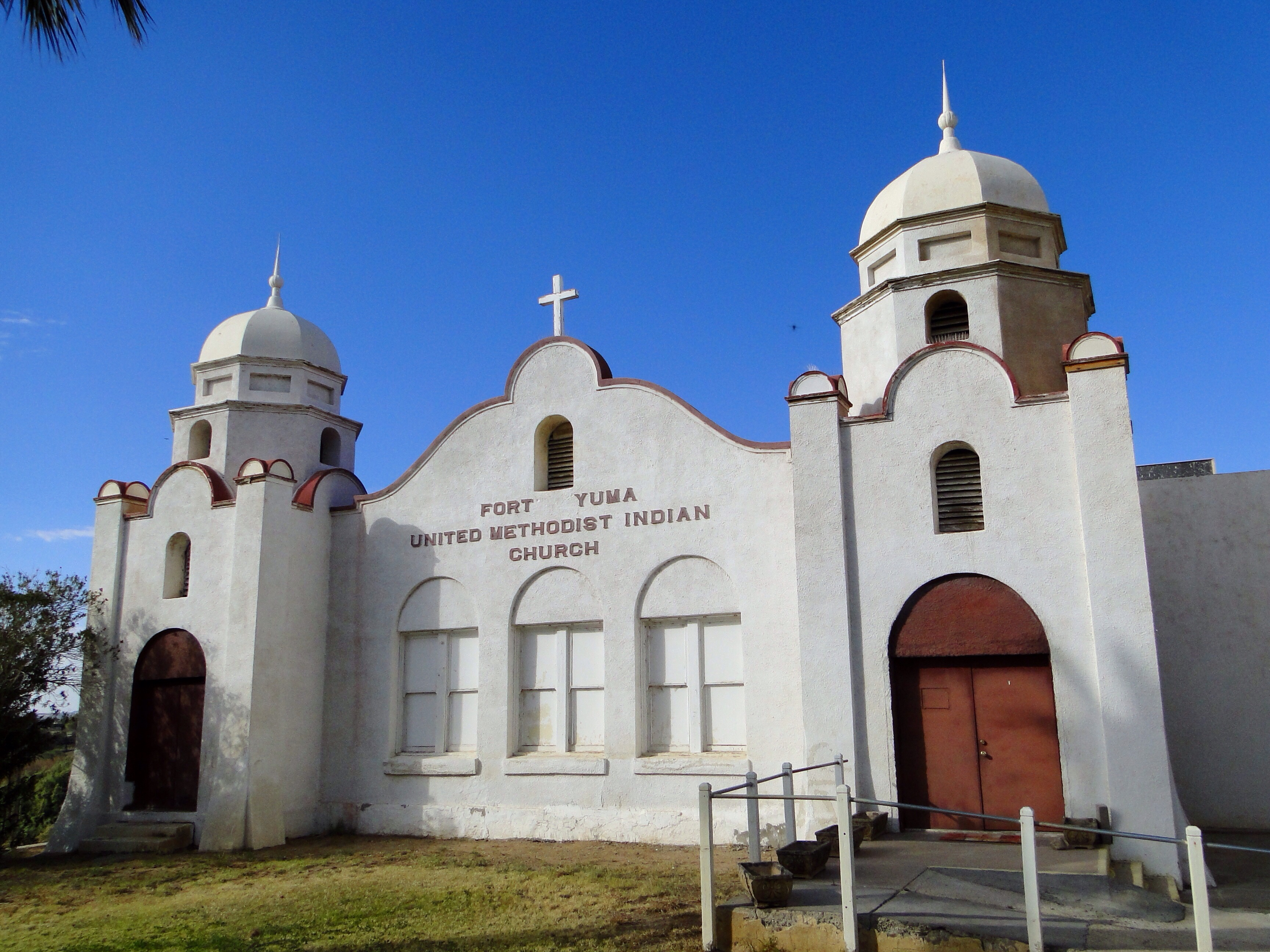
- Fort Yuma United Methodist Indian Church, located on the reservation

- Location of Fort Yuma Indian Reservation at the border of Yuma County, Arizona and Imperial County, California
- Tribe: Quechan
- Country: United States
- State: California and Arizona

Area
  - Total: 178.197 km^{2} (68.802 sq mi)

Population (2010)
  - Total: 2,189
- Website: Fort Yuma Quechan Tribe

The Fort Yuma Indian Reservation is a part of the traditional lands of the Quechan people. Established in 1884 from the former Fort Yuma, the reservation, at 32°47′04″N 114°38′43″W, has a land area of 178.197 km^{2} (68.802 sq mi) in southeastern Imperial County, California, and western Yuma County, Arizona, near the city of Yuma, Arizona. Both the county and city are named for the tribe. As of the 2010 census the population was 2,189. In 1910, the community of Bard, California, was created after the eastern part of the reservation was declared surplus under the Dawes Act.

In 2009, the Quechan Tribe opened a large gaming resort, the Quechan Casino Resort, on their reservation land.
