= Canebrake Canyon, California =

Valley in California, United States

Coordinates: 32°53′44″N 116°15′38″W

Canebrake Canyon is a valley at an elevation of 1145 feet in the deserts of Southern California. Canebrake Canyon is found southwest of Mesquite Oasis, northeast of the Tierra Blanca Mountains. An open wilderness of San Diego County, California, it is reached nearby from popular Anza-Borrego Desert State Park and is a remote hiking destination.

Canebrake Canyon forms its own California Special district with its own civil government, the Canebrake County Water District, which currently maintains 2 wells and 2 storage tanks; one "important tradition of the Canebrake County Water District is the volunteer support provided by community members to perform tasks large and small required to keep water flowing." The District is owned by local ranchers who elect its members.

Canebrake Canyon lies along the California Overland Trail connecting the strategic Aqua Caliente Hot Springs to Fort Yuma on the Colorado and Gila Rivers during the American settlement of California. It overlooks the historic Butterfield Overland Stage route.

Canebrake Canyon is listed by the National Geospatial Intelligence Agency in Bethesda, Maryland.
