= California State Route 86 =

Highway in California

State Route 86
- SR 86 highlighted in red

Route information
- Maintained by Caltrans
- Length: 90.67 mi (145.92 km)
- Existed: 1964 renumbering (from US 99)–present

Major junctions
- South end: SR 111 near Heber
- CR S31 in Heber; I-8 in El Centro; I-8 BL / CR S80 in El Centro; CR S28 in Imperial; CR S27 south of Citrus View; SR 78 from near Brawley to near Kane Spring; CR S26 in Westmorland; CR S30 in Westmorland; CR S22 in Salton City
- North end: I-10 in Indio

Location
- Country: United States
- State: California
- Counties: Imperial, Riverside

Highway system
- State highways in California; Interstate; US; State; Scenic; History; Pre‑1964; Unconstructed; Deleted; Freeways
| ← SR 85 | → SR 87 |

State Route 86 (SR 86) is a north–south state highway in the U.S. State of California that connects the Imperial and Coachella valleys in the southeastern desert region of the state. It runs from State Route 111 near the Mexican border crossing at Calexico north through the Imperial Valley via El Centro and Brawley, and around the west side of the Salton Sea into the Coachella Valley. It then goes through Coachella before terminating at Interstate 10 in Indio. Though some maps and signs may mark SR 86 as continuous through the City of Imperial, control of the route within the city was relinquished to that local jurisdiction and is thus no longer officially part of the state highway system. There are further plans for the state to relinquish control of the entire southern segment of SR 86 between its terminus at SR 111 and SR 78 near Brawley.

== Route description ==
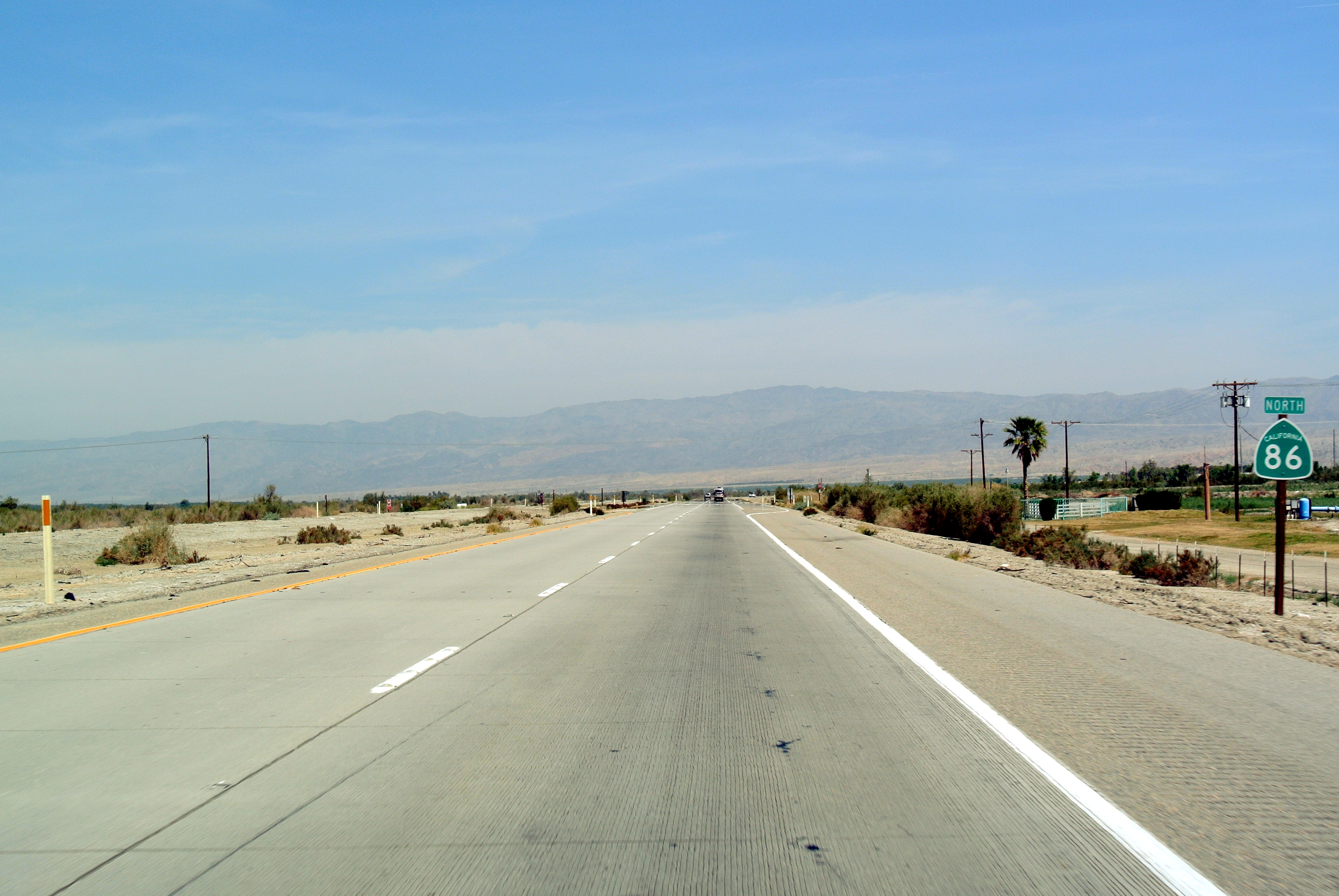
SR 86 north of Salton City, looking north. Salton Sea in the background

Route 86 is defined in section 386, subdivision (a), of the California Streets and Highways Code:

Route 86 is from:
(1) Route 111 to Route 8 near El Centro.
(2) Route 8 near El Centro to the southern limit of the City of Imperial.
(3) The northern limit of the City of Imperial to Route 10 in the City of Indio via the vicinity of City of Brawley.

Subdivision (b) permits the state to relinquish control of the southern portion of the highway between its terminus at Route 111 and Route 78/Fredricks Road north of Brawley to local jurisdictions. Since the City of Imperial took control of its segment of the highway by 2018, subdivision (e) further mandates that the city must still "maintain within its jurisdiction signs directing motorists to the continuation of Route 86".

SR 86 begins at an intersection with SR 111, just east of the town of Heber, as Heber Road. After traveling west through Heber, and intersecting CR S31, SR 86 heads north and enters the city of El Centro (as 4th Street), having an interchange with I-8. Passing through downtown El Centro, SR 86 intersects Main Street (CR S80) before curving to the west (as Adams Avenue). The highway continues north on Imperial Avenue before it enters the city of Imperial and passes Imperial County Airport, continuing north as it leaves the city limits.

North of Imperial, SR 86 intersects CR S27 before making a turn to the northeast, entering the city of Brawley. It passes to the west of downtown (as Western Avenue) before turning west onto Main Street, running concurrently with SR 78. Both SR 78 and 86 turn northwest before passing through the city of Westmoreland and intersecting CR S30. After briefly turning west, SR 78 and 86 turn northwest again and pass through Elmore and Kane Spring; SR 78 turns west (towards San Diego County), while SR 86 continues northwest along the western edge of the Salton Sea (just east of Anza-Borrego Desert State Park), before it intersects CR S22. SR 86 passes through the Torres-Martinez Indian Reservation and Coolidge Spring before entering Riverside County.

Just north of the county line in Oasis, SR 86 continues north on an expressway, turning away from the Salton Sea and heading through agricultural fields and farmlands. The route then meets SR 111, and turns northwest, running parallel to that highway. As it nears Indio, the expressway turns into a freeway. SR 86 ends at an interchange with I-10.

SR 86 is part of the California Freeway and Expressway System, and north of the southern SR 78 junction is part of the National Highway System, a network of highways that are considered essential to the country's economy, defense, and mobility by the Federal Highway Administration.

== Future ==
In 2013, the California Legislature authorized the state to relinquish control of the southern segment of SR 86 within unincorporated Imperial County, El Centro, Imperial, and Brawley; and between its terminus at SR 111 and SR 78/Fredricks Road. Once these relinquishments are complete, the SR 78/SR 86 concurrency will no longer be needed, and therefore language was added to eventually transfer that segment from SR 86's definition to SR 78's. In 2018, the California Legislature amended the legislative definition to reflect the City of Imperial taking control of its portion.

== History ==
In the late 20th century, SR 86 had a rather notorious reputation for frequent and often fatal collisions. For much of its length, especially between the southern tip of the Coachella Valley to the Imperial County line, SR 86 was a two-lane road with easy access from rural side roads. A driver trying to pass might find himself headed straight for the side of another vehicle pulling out from one of the side roads. This reputation earned SR 86 the nickname "Blood Alley".

State Route 86S
- Location: Coachella
- Existed: 1964–2012

Originally a part of U.S. Route 99 until the 1960s, the northern end of SR 86 was widened and rerouted through the new and rather unusually designation State Route 86S (SR 86S) (for "supplemental") soon after the signing of the North American Free Trade Agreement (NAFTA), making SR 86 a four- or six-lane highway for most of its length. Since it is easier to enter California from the Imperial Valley than through San Diego, SR 86 sees a great deal of truck traffic to and from Mexico, earning it still another nickname, "The NAFTA Highway". The new highway has proven to be at least as dangerous as the old alignment owing to much the same problems of poorly marked and uncontrolled side roads. A rash of fatal crashes in early 2005 prompted the city of Coachella to push Caltrans for the installation of at least two more traffic signals on SR 86S.

In December 2012, the SR 86 designation was transferred to the routing of SR 86S, and SR 86S ceased to exist. State Route 195 was removed from the state highway system as a result. SR 86 was originally truncated to Avenue 46, but the State Route 86S expressway, which replaced SR 86 around the east side of Coachella and Indio, did reach I-10. Despite SR 86's rerouting, the Airport Boulevard interchange remains numbered as exit 16, reflecting the former SR 86S's distance.

== Major intersections ==
Except where prefixed with a letter, postmiles were measured on the road as it was in 1964, based on the alignment that existed at the time, and do not necessarily reflect current mileage. Postmile prefixes include: R reflecting a realignment in the route since then, M indicating a second realignment, L referring to an overlap due to a correction or change, and T indicating postmiles classified as temporary. Segments that remain unconstructed or have been relinquished to local control may be omitted. The numbers reset at county lines; the start and end postmiles in each county are given in the county column.

| County | Location | Postmile | Destinations | Notes |
|---|---|---|---|---|
| Imperial; IMP R0.00-67.82 | | R0.00 | Heber Road | Continuation beyond SR 111 |
| Imperial; IMP R0.00-67.82 | Heber | R0.00 | SR 111 – Brawley, Calexico | Southern terminus of SR 86 |
| Imperial; IMP R0.00-67.82 | Heber | 2.08 | CR S31 (Dogwood Road) | |
| Imperial; IMP R0.00-67.82 | El Centro | 6.01 | I-8 – Yuma, San Diego | Interchange; south end of I-8 Bus. overlap; I-8 exit 115 |
| Imperial; IMP R0.00-67.82 | El Centro | L7.31 | CR S80 east (Main Street) – Holtville | South end of CR S80 overlap; CR S80 is former US 80 |
| Imperial; IMP R0.00-67.82 | El Centro | L8.53 7.31 | I-8 BL west (Imperial Avenue) / CR S80 west (Adams Avenue) to I-8 – San Diego | North end of CR S80 / I-8 Bus. overlap; CR S80 is former US 80 |
| Imperial; IMP R0.00-67.82 | Imperial | | North end of state maintenance at Imperial southern city limit | |
| Imperial; IMP R0.00-67.82 | Imperial | 10.82 | CR S28 (Barioni Boulevard) | |
| Imperial; IMP R0.00-67.82 | Imperial | | South end of state maintenance at Imperial northern city limit | |
| Imperial; IMP R0.00-67.82 | | 15.32 | CR S27 (Keystone Road) | |
| Imperial; IMP R0.00-67.82 | Brawley | 20.63 | Main Street, 1st Street – Blythe | Former SR 78 east |
| Imperial; IMP R0.00-67.82 | | | SR 78 east / Fredricks Road | South end of SR 78 overlap |
| Imperial; IMP R0.00-67.82 | Westmorland | | CR S26 east (Boarts Road) | Western terminus of CR S26 |
| Imperial; IMP R0.00-67.82 | Westmorland | 27.51 | CR S30 (Center Street) | |
| Imperial; IMP R0.00-67.82 | | 43.56 | SR 78 west – Julian, Oceanside | North end of SR 78 overlap |
| Imperial; IMP R0.00-67.82 | Salton City | 56.12 | CR S22 west (Borrego-Salton Seaway) / South Marina Drive – Borrego Springs, Anza-Borrego, Park Headquarters | Eastern terminus of CR S22 |
| Imperial; IMP R0.00-67.82 | | 63.63 | Brawley Avenue – Salton Sea Beach | |
| Imperial; IMP R0.00-67.82 | Desert Shores | 66.14 | Desert Shores Drive | |
| Riverside; RIV 0.00-R23.00 | | R12.48 | 66th Avenue to SR 111 – Niland, Calipatria, Mecca | Former SR 195 |
| Riverside; RIV 0.00-R23.00 | | | 62nd Avenue | |
| Riverside; RIV 0.00-R23.00 | Coachella | R16.74 | Airport Boulevard | Interchange; signed as exit 16 |
| Riverside; RIV 0.00-R23.00 | Coachella | | 52nd Avenue | |
| Riverside; RIV 0.00-R23.00 | Coachella | | 50th Avenue, Tyler Street | |
| Riverside; RIV 0.00-R23.00 | Coachella | | South end of freeway | |
| Riverside; RIV 0.00-R23.00 | Coachella–Indio line | R22.16 | Dillon Road (I-10 Bus.) to I-10 east | Interchange; I-10 west exit 146 |
| Riverside; RIV 0.00-R23.00 | Indio | R23.00 | I-10 west – Los Angeles | Northern terminus of SR 86; Access to I-10 east is via Dillon Road; I-10 east exit 145 |
1.000 mi = 1.609 km; 1.000 km = 0.621 mi: Concurrency terminus
