= California State Route 115 =

Highway in California

State Route 115

- SR 115 highlighted in red

Route information
- Maintained by Caltrans
- Length: 35.24 mi (56.71 km)

Major junctions
- South end: I-8 near Holtville
- CR S80 in Rico; CR S28 near Fuller; CR S27 near Curlew; SR 78 from Orita to Alamorio; CR S26 in Munyon
- North end: SR 111 / CR S30 in Calipatria

Location
- Country: United States
- State: California
- Counties: Imperial

Highway system
- State highways in California; Interstate; US; State; Scenic; History; Pre‑1964; Unconstructed; Deleted; Freeways
← SR 114	→ SR 116

State Route 115 (SR 115) is a state highway in the U.S. state of California. It runs in Imperial County from Interstate 8 (I-8) southeast of Holtville to SR 111 in Calipatria. The routing was added to the state highway system in 1933, and was constructed by 1934; SR 115 was officially designated in the 1964 state highway renumbering.

== Route description ==
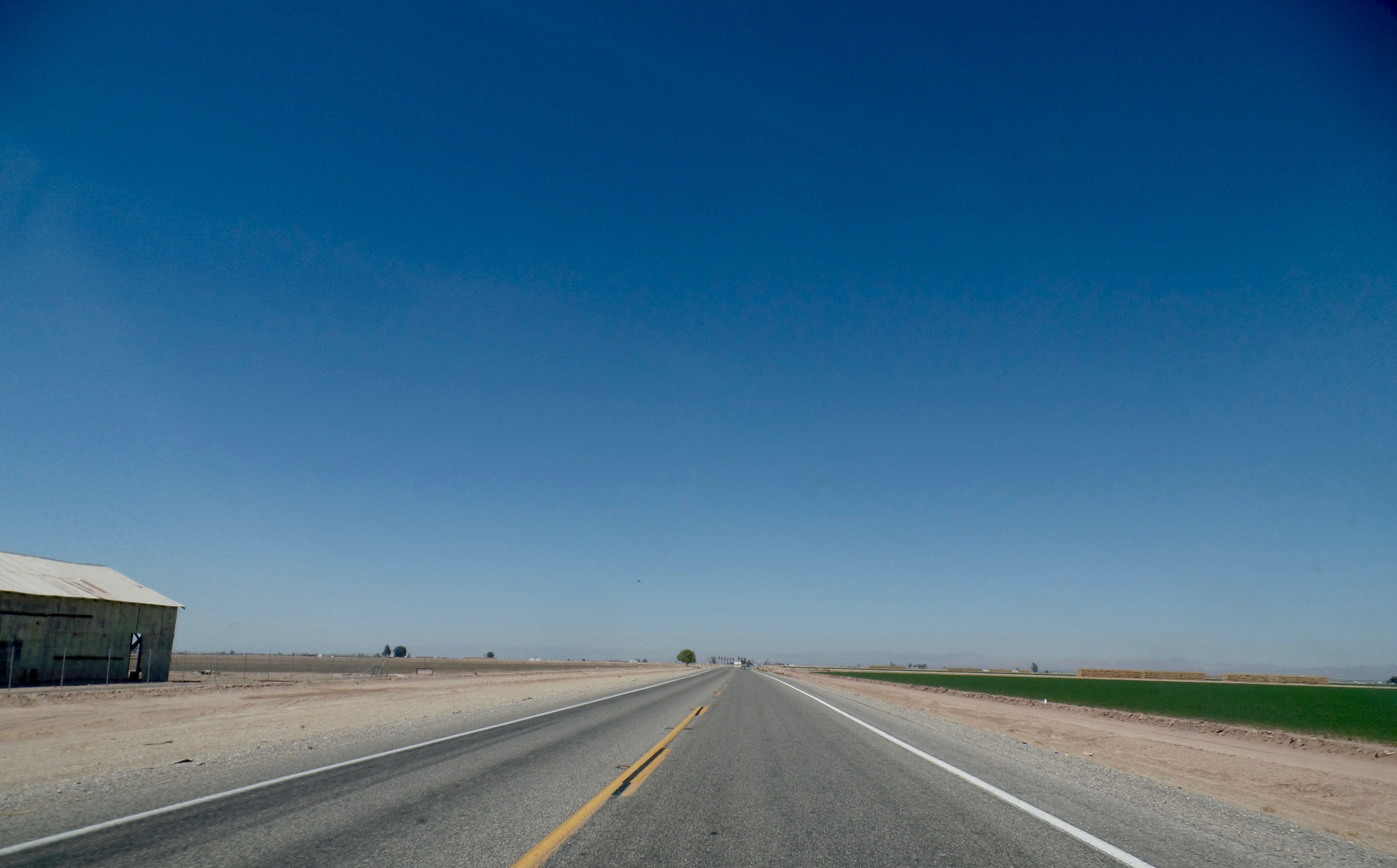
SR 115 northbound towards Calipatria

Route 115 is defined in section 415 of the California Streets and Highways Code. The definition omits the concurrency with Route 78 instead of duplicating that segment in the other route's definition in the code:

Route 115 is from:
(a) Route 8 southeasterly of Holtville to Route 78.
(b) Route 78 east of Brawley to Route 111 at Calipatria.

SR 115 begins with an interchange at I-8. It then heads northwest through the community of Date City and briefly enters the city of Holtville. Near its exit of the city, it intersects a few county roads before turning due north and continuing through rural Imperial County, eventually beginning an overlap with SR 78 and continuing west. East of Alamorio, SR 115 turns due north again, and intersects CR S26. After a few miles, the highway turns due west, reaching its north end in Calipatria at SR 111.

SR 115 is part of the California Freeway and Expressway System, but is not part of the National Highway System, a network of highways that are considered essential to the country's economy, defense, and mobility by the Federal Highway Administration. SR 115 is eligible for the State Scenic Highway System, but it is not officially designated as a scenic highway by the California Department of Transportation. In 2013, SR 115 had an annual average daily traffic (AADT) of 830 between Wirt Road and East Avenue, and 5,800 between the intersection of Walnut Avenue and 5th Street and the intersection of the highway with Holt Avenue, the latter of which was the highest AADT for the highway.

== History ==
The routing from Brawley to Calipatria was added to the state highway system in 1933; following the completion of the road from Yuma to San Diego, increased tourism and growth led to the development of more highways in Imperial County, and the construction of the system was expected to aid in future growth, according to the Los Angeles Times. The northern section above SR 78 was legislatively defined as Route 187; the part of the highway south of Route 187 was defined as Route 201.

The roadway had been constructed by 1934, though the state described the majority of it as a "low type" road. The portion from Route 78 to US 80 was paved by 1938, and the entire road had been paved by 1940. By 1956, the routing was signed as Route 115. By 1961, the highway continued just west of Holtville to an intersection with US 80 (later I-8), where it ran concurrently with US 80 briefly before heading south to a junction with SR 98 in Bonds Corner.

SR 115 was officially defined in the 1964 state highway renumbering. The segment south of SR 78 was altered in 1972; the portion between I-8 south to SR 98 near Bonds Corner was deleted, and the definition was clarified from "Route 8 near Holtville" to "Route 8 southeasterly of Holtville". By 1975, the routing of SR 115 had been adjusted to end at I-8, south of the old US 80 routing.

In 2021, a bridge which allows the highway to cross over the Alamo River was named for Erik Silva, a Marine who died in Iraq in 2003.

== Future ==
The 2007 Imperial County Transportation Plan proposed the improvement of SR 115 from the Evan Hewes Highway north to SR 111 from a two-lane highway to a four-lane expressway.

== Major intersections ==
Except where prefixed with a letter, postmiles were measured on the road as it was in 1964, based on the alignment that existed at the time, and do not necessarily reflect current mileage. Postmile prefixes include: R reflecting a realignment in the route since then, M indicating a second realignment, L referring to an overlap due to a correction or change, and T indicating postmiles classified as temporary. Segments that remain unconstructed or have been relinquished to local control may be omitted. The entire route is in Imperial County.

Location	Postmile	Destinations	Notes
	R3.20	I-8 – San Diego, Yuma	Interchange; south end of SR 115
		Evan Hewes Highway east	Former US 80 east, northern terminus of Van Der Linden Road
Holtville		Holt Avenue (CR S32 north)	South end of CR S32 overlap; former SR 115 north
Holtville		Cedar Avenue (CR S32 south)	North end of CR S32 overlap
	9.54	CR S80 west (Evan Hewes Highway) – El Centro, San Diego	Former US 80 west
		CR S28 (Worthington Road) – Imperial	
		CR S27 (Keystone Road)	
	21.17 21.02 (Note: Indicates that the postmile represents the distance along SR 78 rather than SR 115.)	SR 78 east – Glamis, Palo Verde, Blythe	South end of SR 78 overlap; former CR S78 east
	18.65 21.18	SR 78 west – Holtville, Brawley	North end of SR 78 overlap
	25.99	CR S26 (Rutherford Road)	
Calipatria	35.24	SR 111 (Sorenson Avenue) – Brawley, Niland, Indio	North end of SR 115
Calipatria	35.24	CR S30 (Main Street)	Continuation beyond SR 111
1.000 mi = 1.609 km; 1.000 km = 0.621 mi: Concurrency terminus
