= California State Route 111 =

State highway in California

State Route 111
- SR 111 highlighted in red; the gap represents the relinquished portion

Route information
- Maintained by Caltrans
- Length: 52.40 mi (84.33 km) Portions of SR 111 have been relinquished to or are otherwise maintained by local or other governments, and are not included in the length.

Major junctions
- South end: Imperial Avenue and 1st Street in Calexico, east of the 2018 upgraded Calexico West Port of Entry
- SR 98 in Calexico; SR 86 near Heber; I-8 near El Centro; CR S80 near El Centro; CR S28 near Imperial; CR S27 south of Citrus View; SR 78 in Brawley; CR S26 near Rockwood; SR 115 / CR S30 in Calipatria; SR 74 in Palm Desert
- North end: I-10 near Palm Springs

Location
- Country: United States
- State: California
- Counties: Imperial, Riverside

Highway system
- State highways in California; Interstate; US; State; Scenic; History; Pre‑1964; Unconstructed; Deleted; Freeways
← SR 110	→ SR 112

State Route 111 (SR 111) is a state highway in the southeastern part of U.S. state of California. It is a north-south route serving the Imperial Valley, the eastern shore of the Salton Sea, and the Coachella Valley. Its southern terminus is at Imperial Avenue and 1st Street in Calexico, at the former entrance to the Calexico West Port of Entry (the state has not yet officially rerouted the highway to the current entrance to the Mexican border at 2nd Street and Cesar Chavez Boulevard since its opening in 2018). SR 111's northern terminus is at Interstate 10 at the northwestern corner of the Palm Springs city limits, near the unincorporated community of Whitewater. Though some maps and signs mark SR 111 as continuous between SR 86 near Heber and the Cathedral City–Palm Springs line, control of the segment was relinquished to local jurisdictions and is thus no longer officially part of the state highway system.

== Route description ==
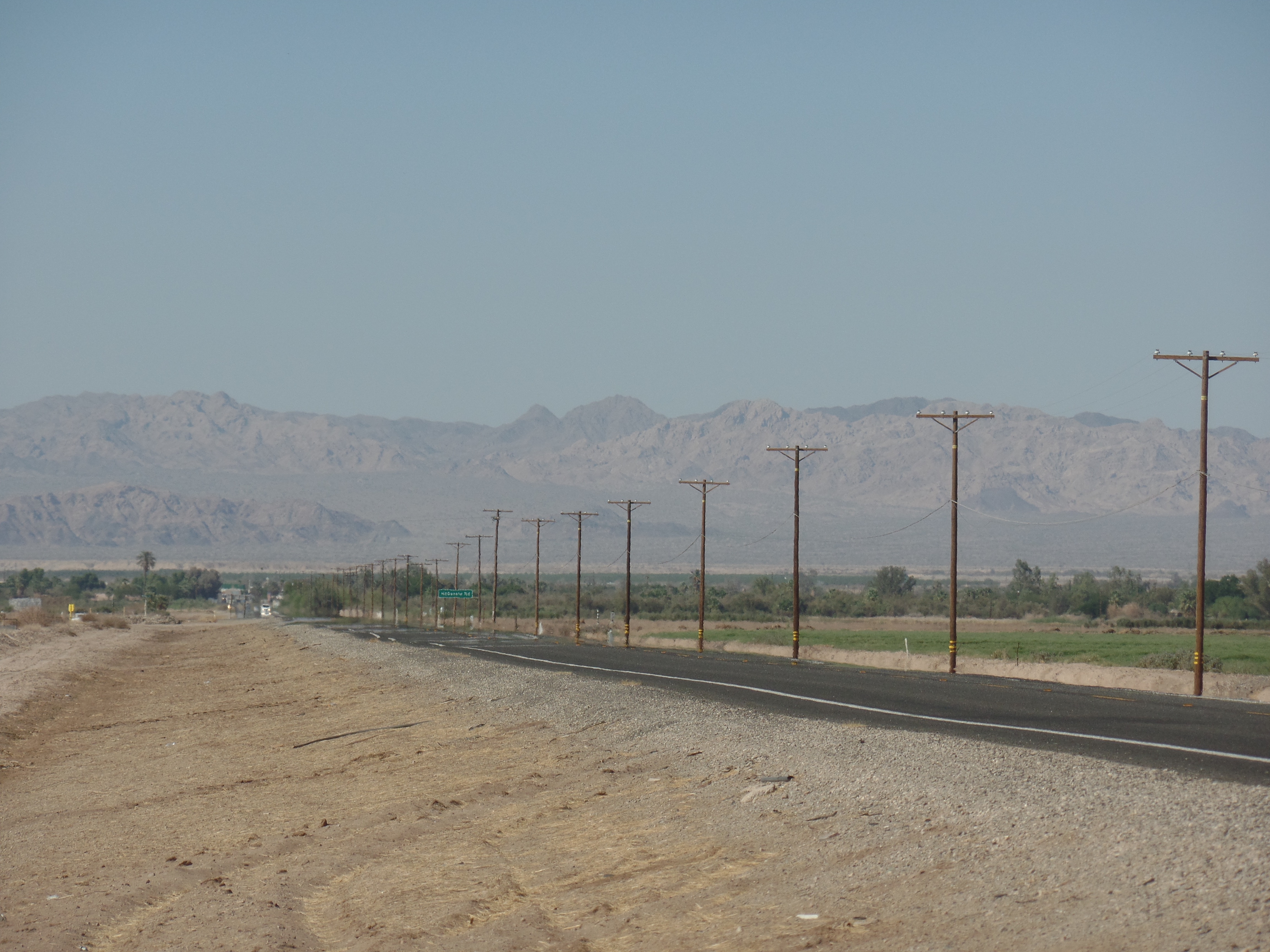
SR 111 north in Niland

Route 111 is defined in section 411, subdivision (a), of the California Streets and Highways Code:

Route 111 is from:
(1) The international border south of Calexico to Route 78 near Brawley, passing east of Heber.
(2) Route 78 near Brawley to Route 86 via the north shore of the Salton Sea.
(3) The western city limits of Cathedral City to Route 10 near Whitewater.

The definition omits the concurrency with Route 78 instead of duplicating that segment in the other route's definition in the code. And while control of the former portion of Route 111 between Route 86 in unincorporated Riverside County and the western city limits of Cathedral City has been relinquished by the state to local jurisdictions, subdivision (b) further mandates that those cities and the county must still "maintain within their respective jurisdictions signs directing motorists to the continuation of Route 111". Subdivision (c) further permits the state to relinquish control the segment of Route 111 within Palm Springs.

SR 111 begins near the Calexico West Port of Entry, where Calexico connects with the Mexican city Mexicali. Prior to the port of entry's 2018 realignment, SR 111 directly connected to the border crossing, with northbound traffic entering from Mexican side of the border via Avenida Cristóbal Colón, and southbound traffic exiting onto Mexican Federal Highway 5. Since then, traffic heading to the border diverts from SR 111 onto westbound East Second Street to the port of entry's new facilities at Cesar Chavez Boulevard. The segment of the highway from East Second Street south to the site of the former border crossing at East First Street remains under state control, pending any relinquishment by Caltrans.

SR 111 then intersects with SR 98 in Calexico before heading north to SR 86 in Heber. As SR 111 continues further north through Imperial County, it enters El Centro. There, it intersects with Interstate 8 (I-8), which runs east to Yuma and west to San Diego, before passing through the agricultural communities of Holtville, Brawley, Calipatria and Niland.

A nearly 40-mile (64 km) length of the highway dotted with date and citrus groves follows both the old Southern Pacific "Sunset Route" (now the main Union Pacific line between Los Angeles and Yuma, Arizona) and the eastern shore of the Salton Sea. Though some small settlements and a California state park line the shore, the area is eerily empty due to the sea's rapidly declining water quality. The small town of North Shore is all but abandoned as a tourist destination, though more than 3,400 residents were counted at the 2010 census.

SR 111 enters the southeast corner of the Coachella Valley as a two-lane highway. It used to run concurrently with SR 86 in Coachella, but SR 86 has since been moved to a newer expressway alignment. SR 111 continues northwest as a major arterial road, four lanes or wider, through Indio, La Quinta, Indian Wells, Palm Desert, Rancho Mirage, and Cathedral City. As it approaches this area, the northbound traffic is on Indian Canyon Drive, and the southbound is on Palm Canyon Drive. An alternate route runs on Gene Autry Trail while mainline SR 111 continues west on Vista Chino. Continuing west from Cathedral City, the highway enters Palm Springs, then swings north and then west to bypass downtown, while SR 111 Business passes through the congested downtown area. The highway transitions from an arterial road to a divided expressway as it exits Palm Springs just northwest of San Rafael Drive. It ends at an interchange with I-10 near the foot of San Jacinto Peak, just east of the San Gorgonio Pass.

SR 111 is part of the California Freeway and Expressway System and the portions south of SR 78, and in the city of Indio are part of the National Highway System, a network of highways that are considered essential to the country's economy, defense, and mobility by the Federal Highway Administration. SR 111 is eligible to be included in the State Scenic Highway System, but it is not officially designated as a scenic highway by the California Department of Transportation.

== History ==
SR 111 was first proposed in the early 1930s due to the area's growth bought on by the Southern Pacific Railroad.

A 1993 rerouting of the highway takes drivers away from the historic center of Palm Springs, but meets with its original alignment as Business Route 111 a few miles further south.

The northern terminus was so busy in the 1950s before the construction of the freeway that visitors returning home to Los Angeles might have waited as long as two hours to make the left turn on the two-lane road that was once multiplexed as US Highways U.S. Route 60, US 70 and US 99.

In 1995, Caltrans was allowed to relinquish any portion of Route 111 through a city for that city to maintain. The legislature opted to make the act an "urgency statute", effective immediately, so that the local governments could improve traffic bottlenecks along the route as soon as possible. The legislative definition of the route was amended in 1996 to exclude the portions in Rancho Mirage and Cathedral City, which had both been relinquished. Cathedral City completed a pedestrian-friendly redesign in 1998. The stretch through Rancho Mirage, which the city still calls "Highway 111" regardless of the relinquishment, has the Coachella Valley's only synchronized traffic lights; they are set to 45 mph (70 km/h).

A 2003 law did not change the route, but clarified that the former highway through those cities could not be taken back by the state, and repealed the section added in 1995 allowing relinquishment to any city. Subsequently, in 2005, the legislature allowed relinquishment within Indian Wells, Indio, and Palm Desert, subject to the same conditions, and to the condition that the cities must maintain signs for the route. La Quinta was added to the list of eligible cities in 2007. As of late 2007, none of these four cities have taken over maintenance of Route 111.

In November 2005, signs on Verbenia Avenue at the highway's northern terminus and along Interstate 10 were replaced to reflect the street's name change to "Haugen-Lehmann Way", honoring two Riverside County sheriff's deputies gunned down by a sniper on that street in 1997.

In a similar move in December 2005, the stretch of SR 111 through La Quinta was named the "Deputy Bruce Lee Memorial Highway". Lee was a Riverside County deputy sheriff in the city for many years and was killed in 2003 during an altercation with a mentally disturbed suspect. The suspect was able to take Lee's baton during the altercation and used it to bludgeon the officer.

In September 2019 Caltrans began a three-phase $19-21.5 million mitigation project to protect SR-111 from a moving mud pot called the Niland Geyser, southeast of the Salton Sea near the junction with Davis and Gillespie Roads. The plans included using steel walls to divert water into a gravel wash, digging drainage under the road to direct subsurface water to a wash west of the road, and building a five-mile temporary road 50 feet to the west to divert around the geyser, with the original road being rebuilt once the geyser had passed. Work continued into 2021.

After being Imperial Avenue in Calexico, the road is known as the Imperial Pioneers Expressway and the Victor Veysey Expressway in Imperial County. Several parts of the route are at or under sea level, similar to SR 86 outside of Brawley.

== Major intersections ==
Except where prefixed with a letter, postmiles were measured on the road as it was in 1964, based on the alignment that existed at the time, and do not necessarily reflect current mileage. Postmile prefixes include: R reflecting a realignment in the route since then, M indicating a second realignment, L referring to an overlap due to a correction or change, and T indicating postmiles classified as temporary. Segments that remain unconstructed or have been relinquished to local control may be omitted. The numbers reset at county lines; the start and end postmiles in each county are given in the county column.

County	Location	Postmile	Destinations	Notes
Imperial; IMP R0.00-65.40	Calexico	R0.00	Fed. 5 south (Boulevard Adolfo López Mateos) – Mexicali	Former continuation beyond the Mexico–United States border; former border crossing, with its northbound entrance accessible from Avenida Cristóbal Colón
Imperial; IMP R0.00-65.40	Calexico	R0.01	First Street	De facto southern terminus following the 2018 closing of the former border crossing; no southbound access from Second Street
Imperial; IMP R0.00-65.40	Calexico	R0.20	Second Street – International border, Mexicali	Serves the Calexico West Port of Entry since 2018
Imperial; IMP R0.00-65.40	Calexico	R1.18	SR 98 (Birch Street) – San Diego, Yuma	
Imperial; IMP R0.00-65.40	Heber	R4.74	SR 86 north (Heber Road) – Heber, El Centro	Southern terminus of SR 86; former US 99 north
Imperial; IMP R0.00-65.40		R7.71	I-8 – Yuma, San Diego, El Centro	Cloverleaf interchange; I-8 exits 118A-B
Imperial; IMP R0.00-65.40		R9.51	CR S80 (Evan Hewes Highway) – El Centro, Holtville	Former US 80
Imperial; IMP R0.00-65.40		R12.88	CR S28 (Worthington Road) – Imperial	
Imperial; IMP R0.00-65.40		R17.41	CR S27 (Keystone Road)	
Imperial; IMP R0.00-65.40	Brawley	22.14 15.04 (Note: Indicates that the postmile represents the distance along SR 78 rather than SR 111.)	SR 78 east / Main Street – Holtville, Blythe	South end of SR 78 overlap; Main Street is former SR 78 west / SR 111 north
Imperial; IMP R0.00-65.40	Brawley	23.67	SR 78 west (Victor V. Veysey Expressway) / Old Highway 111	Interchange; north end of SR 78 overlap; former SR 111 south
Imperial; IMP R0.00-65.40		26.71	CR S26 (Rutherford Road) – Wiest Lake	
Imperial; IMP R0.00-65.40		29.40	Two Rivers Rest Area	Closed permanently in September 2015
Imperial; IMP R0.00-65.40	Calipatria	32.51	SR 115 / CR S30 (Main Street) – Holtville	Northern terminus of SR 115 and CR S30
Riverside; RIV 0.00-R63.38	Mecca	18.43	66th Avenue to SR 86	Former SR 195
Riverside; RIV 0.00-R63.38		22.14	SR 86	Closed, no direct access to SR 86; north end of state maintenance
Riverside; RIV 0.00-R63.38	Thermal	24.51	Palm Street (to Airport Boulevard)	Interchange via connector road; former at-grade intersection with Airport Boulevard closed permanently in 2016; serves Jacqueline Cochran Regional Airport
Riverside; RIV 0.00-R63.38	Coachella–Indio line	26.79	I-10 BL east (Dillon Road) to I-10 / Avenue 48 – Blythe, Phoenix	South end of I-10 Bus. overlap; former US 60 east / US 70 east
Riverside; RIV 0.00-R63.38	Indio	28.53	I-10 BL west (Indio Boulevard)	North end of I-10 Bus. overlap; former US 99 north / SR 86 north
Riverside; RIV 0.00-R63.38	Indio	28.73	Golf Center Parkway to I-10	
Riverside; RIV 0.00-R63.38	Palm Desert	39.57	SR 74 west (Palms to Palms Highway) / Monterey Avenue – Hemet, San Diego	Eastern terminus of SR 74
Riverside; RIV 0.00-R63.38	Cathedral City	45.28	Date Palm Drive to I-10	
Riverside; RIV 0.00-R63.38	Cathedral City–Palm Springs line	47.20	South end of state maintenance	
Riverside; RIV 0.00-R63.38	Palm Springs	47.80 T47.80	SR 111 Bus. north (Palm Canyon Drive)	
Riverside; RIV 0.00-R63.38	Palm Springs	T51.59	Gene Autry Trail to I-10	
Riverside; RIV 0.00-R63.38	Palm Springs	T53.94 53.82	SR 111 Bus. south (Palm Canyon Drive)	
Riverside; RIV 0.00-R63.38		R63.38	I-10 west – Los Angeles	Northern terminus; no access to I-10 east; former US 99; I-10 east exit 111
1.000 mi = 1.609 km; 1.000 km = 0.621 mi: Closed/former; Concurrency terminus; Incomplete access

== Related route ==
State Route 111 Business
- Location: Palm Springs
- Existed: 1993–present

State Route 111 Business (SR 111 Bus.) is a business route of SR 111 in Palm Springs. It follows the original routing of SR 111 through Palm Springs. The route is almost unsigned. There are only two business route signs on the southern and northern termini.

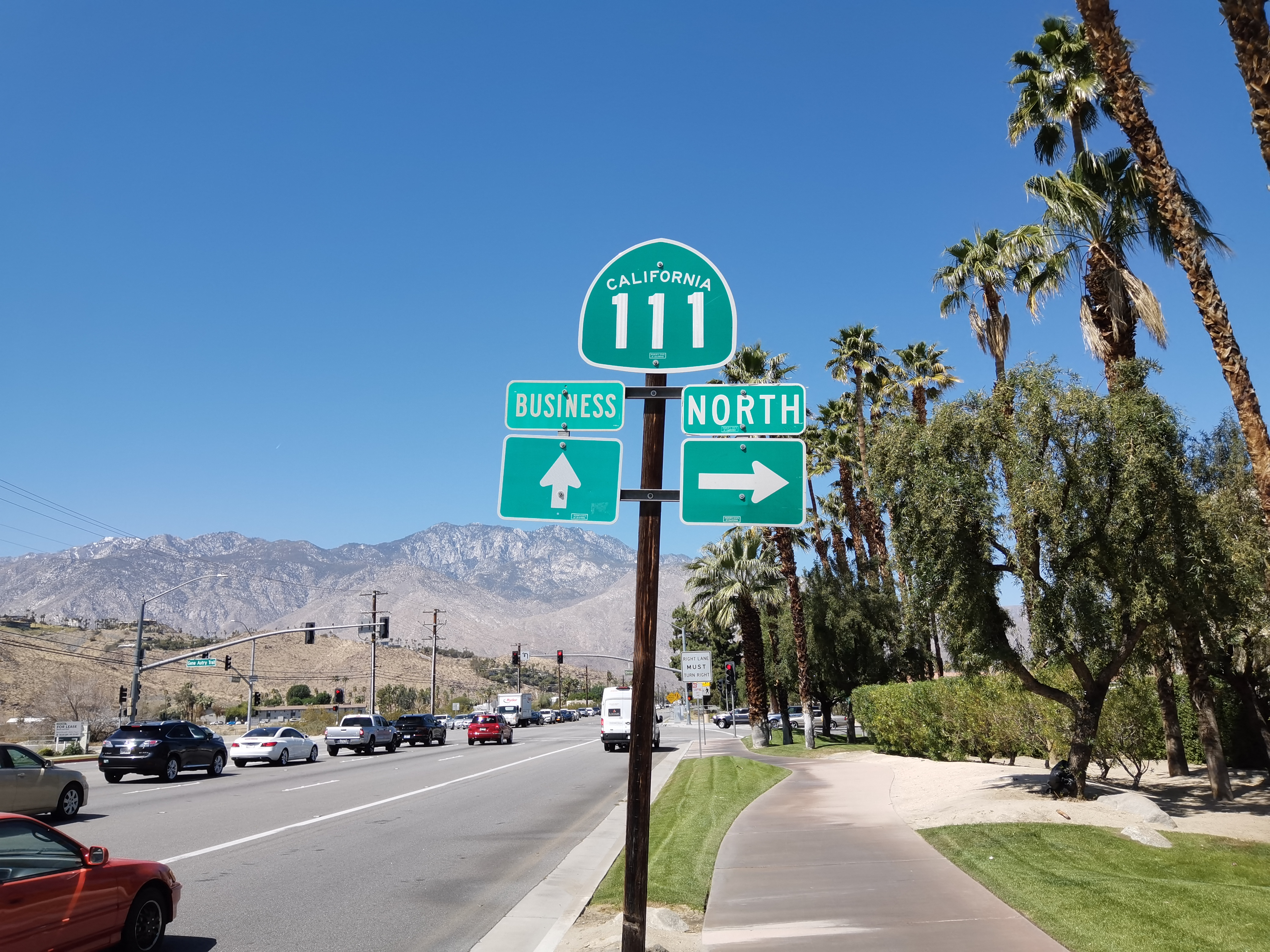
The sign at the southern terminus of SR 111 Bus.

Like many other business routes, it follows the original routing of the parent route. In 1993, SR 111 was rerouted out of Palm Springs and onto the current alignment.

Except where prefixed with a letter, postmiles were measured on the road as it was in 1964, based on the alignment that existed at the time, and do not necessarily reflect current mileage. Postmile prefixes include: R reflecting a realignment in the route since then, M indicating a second realignment, L referring to an overlap due to a correction or change, and T indicating postmiles classified as temporary. Segments that remain unconstructed or have been relinquished to local control may be omitted. The entire route is in Palm Springs, Riverside County.

Postmile	Destinations	Notes
47.8	SR 111 – Calexico, Palm Springs	Southern terminus
53.9	SR 111 – Calexico, Palm Springs	Northern terminus
1.000 mi = 1.609 km; 1.000 km = 0.621 mi
