= California State Route 78 =

Highway in California

State Route 78
- SR 78 highlighted in red

Route information
- Maintained by Caltrans
- Length: 215.39 mi (346.64 km)
- Existed: 1934–present
- Tourist routes: Anza-Borrego Desert State Park Road

Major junctions
- West end: I-5 in Oceanside
- I-15 in Escondido; SR 67 in Ramona; SR 79 from Santa Ysabel to Julian; SR 86 from near Kane Spring to near Brawley; SR 111 in Brawley
- East end: I-10 near Blythe

Location
- Country: United States
- State: California
- Counties: San Diego, Imperial, Riverside

Highway system
- State highways in California; Interstate; US; State; Scenic; History; Pre‑1964; Unconstructed; Deleted; Freeways
← SR 77	→ SR 79

State Route 78 (SR 78) is a state highway in the U.S. state of California that runs from Oceanside east to Blythe, traversing nearly the entire width of the state. Its western terminus is at Interstate 5 (I-5) in San Diego County and its eastern terminus is at I-10 in Riverside County. The route is a freeway through the heavily populated cities of northern San Diego County and a two-lane highway running through the Cuyamaca Mountains to Julian. In Imperial County, SR 78 travels through the desert near the Salton Sea and passes through the city of Brawley and the Algodones Dunes before turning north on the way to its terminus in Blythe.

SR 78 was one of the original state highways designated in 1934, although portions of the route existed as early as 1900. However, it was not designated east of Brawley until 1959. The freeway section in the North County of San Diego that connects Oceanside and Escondido was built in the middle of the twentieth century in several stages, including a transitory stage known as the Vista Way Freeway, and has been altered several times. An expressway bypass of the city of Brawley was completed in 2012. There are many projects slated to add capacity to the freeway due to increasing congestion in the region.

== Route description ==
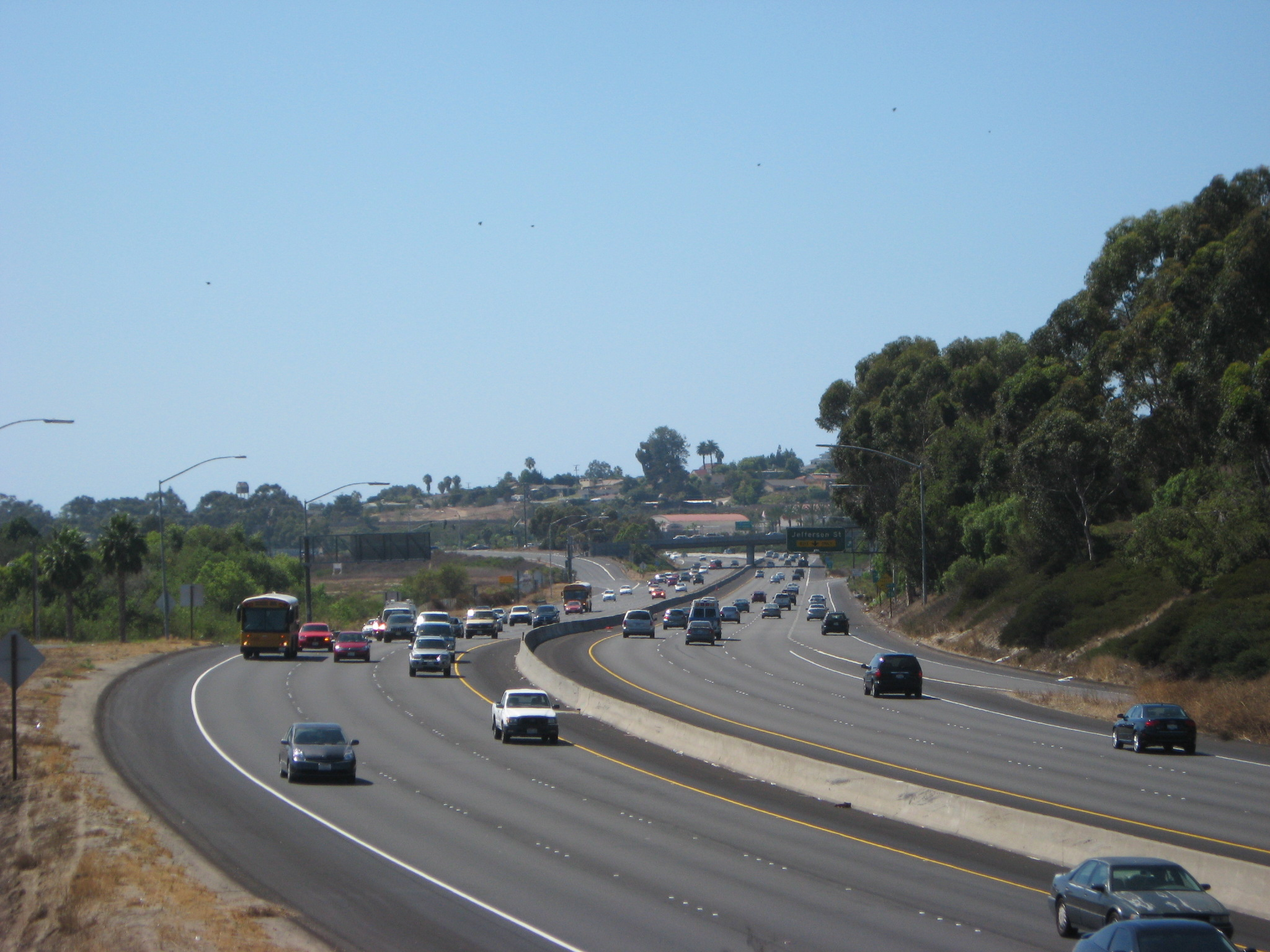
SR 78 in Oceanside at the El Camino Real overpass

Route 78 is defined in section 378 of the California Streets and Highways Code. The definition omits the concurrency with Route 86 instead of duplicating that segment in the other route's definition in the code:

Route 78 is from:
(a) Route 5 near Oceanside to Route 15 near Escondido.
(b) Route 15 near Escondido to Route 86 passing near Ramona, Santa Ysabel, and Julian.
(c) Route 86 near Brawley to Route 10 near Blythe.

SR 78 begins in Oceanside as a continuation of Vista Way. As it encounters a traffic signal and crosses over I-5, the route becomes a suburban freeway traveling east through Oceanside. The freeway loosely parallels Buena Vista Creek before entering the city of Vista. Turning southeast, SR 78 continues into the city of San Marcos near California State University San Marcos and enters Escondido, where it has an interchange with I-15. A 2011 Caltrans study estimated that the average commuter encountered a delay of 10 minutes on the portion from I-5 to I-15. After passing the Centre City Parkway (I-15 Business) interchange, the freeway abruptly ends at the intersection with Broadway. SR 78 then makes a turn south onto Broadway and continues through downtown Escondido by turning east onto Washington Avenue and south onto Ash Street, which becomes San Pasqual Valley Road.

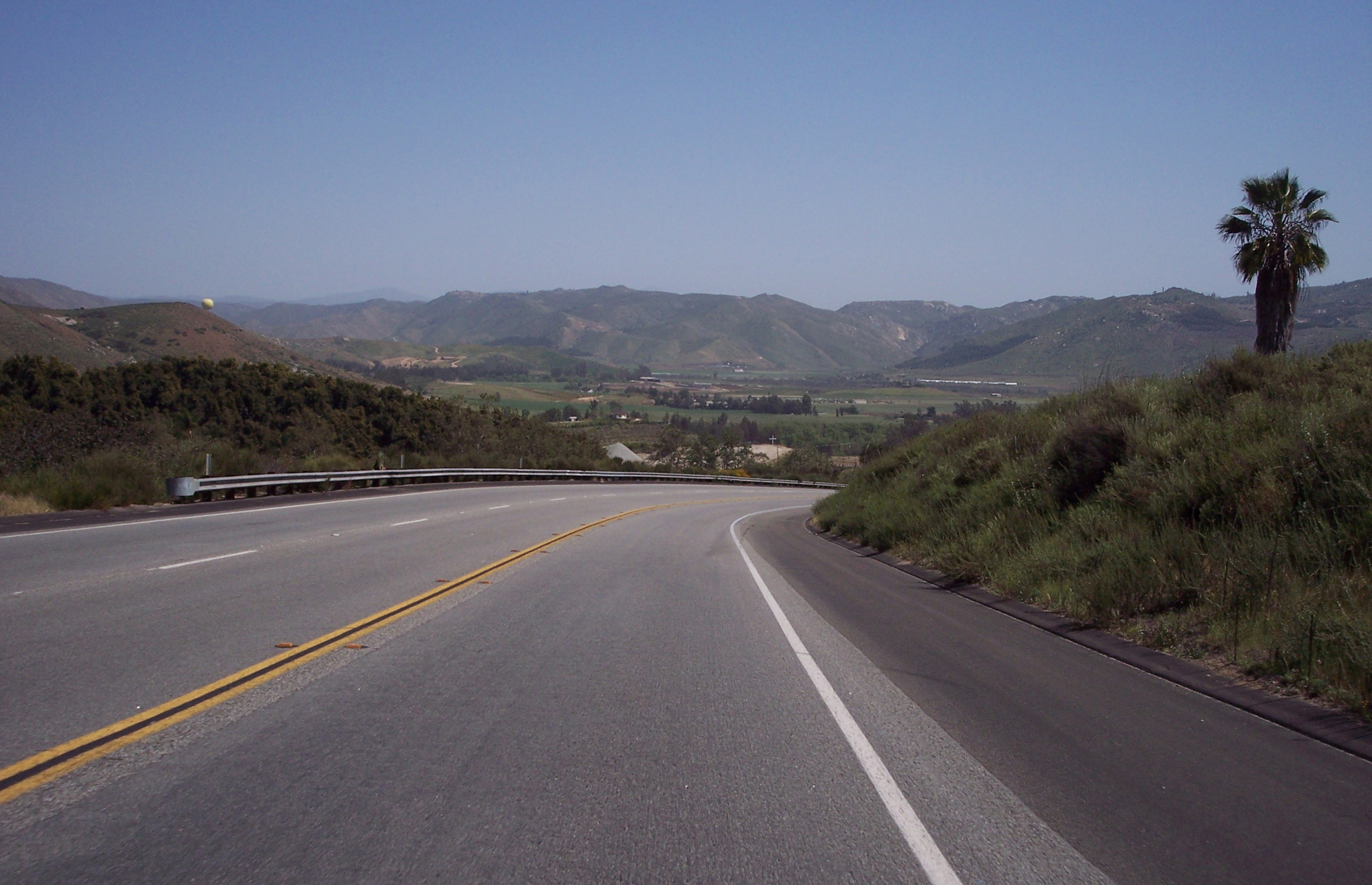
SR 78 eastbound east of Escondido

Turning east once again, SR 78 leaves the Escondido city limits and enters the San Pasqual Valley as it provides access to the San Diego Zoo Safari Park and San Pasqual Battlefield State Park. After leaving the San Pasqual Valley, the road follows a serpentine alignment, heading south to enter the community of Ramona as Pine Street. In Ramona, SR 78 intersects SR 67 and makes a turn east onto Main Street, going through downtown Ramona. The highway leaves Ramona as Julian Road, which continues on a winding mountain alignment through Witch Creek to Santa Ysabel where it meets SR 79.

SR 78 runs concurrently with SR 79 across the headwaters of the San Diego River and through the hamlet of Wynola, briefly entering Cleveland National Forest before reaching Julian and entering the town as Washington Street. The route, still concurrent with SR 79, turns east onto Main Street and travels through downtown Julian before SR 79 diverges south towards Cuyamaca and SR 78 heads northeast as Banner Road. The road intersects with County Route S2 (CR S2) at a junction called Scissors Crossing; CR S2 runs concurrently in a wrong-way concurrency. Shortly afterwards, SR 78 enters Anza-Borrego Desert State Park and is designated as a scenic highway for its length in the state park. Although this route travels many miles south of the town of Borrego Springs, it provides access to the town via CR S3. SR 78 travels through the town of Ocotillo Wells before exiting the state park and entering Imperial County.

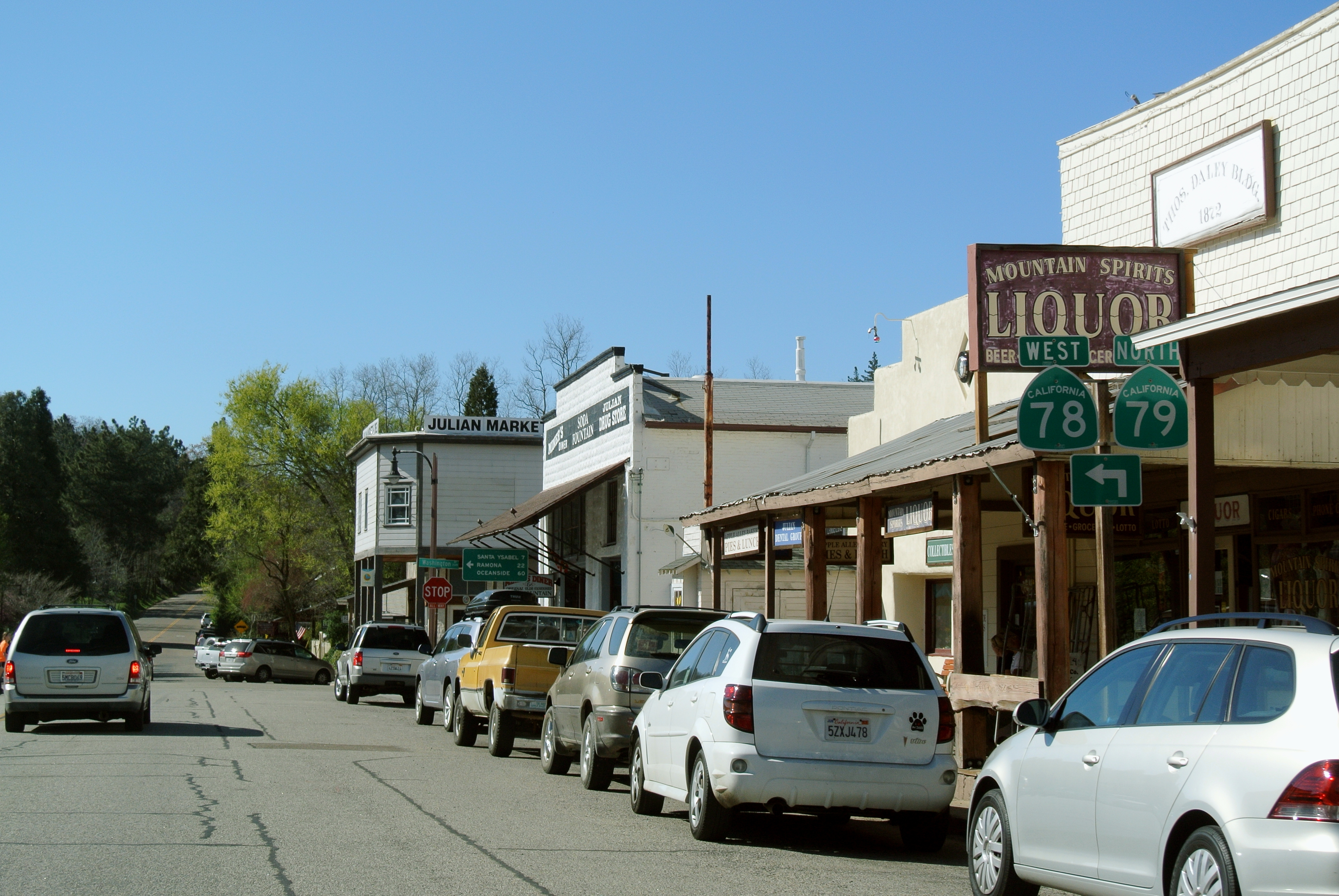
Road leading to SR 78 and SR 79 in Julian

In Imperial County, SR 78 intersects with SR 86, running concurrently with it southwest of the Salton Sea and northwest of San Felipe Creek. SR 78 passes through the desert community of Elmore Desert Ranch before entering the city of Westmorland. The route, still concurrent with SR 86, enters into the city of Brawley as Main Street, where SR 86 splits to the south towards El Centro. SR 78 continues north onto the Brawley Bypass, a freeway that passes to the north of downtown Brawley. SR 111 runs concurrently with SR 78 for a short duration before the latter exits from the freeway and continues east.

Then, SR 78 intersects with SR 115 east of Alamorio, running concurrently with it for a brief distance. Shortly after passing through the small community of Glamis, the road turns northeast and eventually north towards Blythe, passing near the Chocolate Mountain Naval Reserve. As it nears the Colorado River and the Arizona border, SR 78 briefly passes through Cibola National Wildlife Refuge before entering the community of Palo Verde, where the river turns away from the highway and SR 78 enters Riverside County.

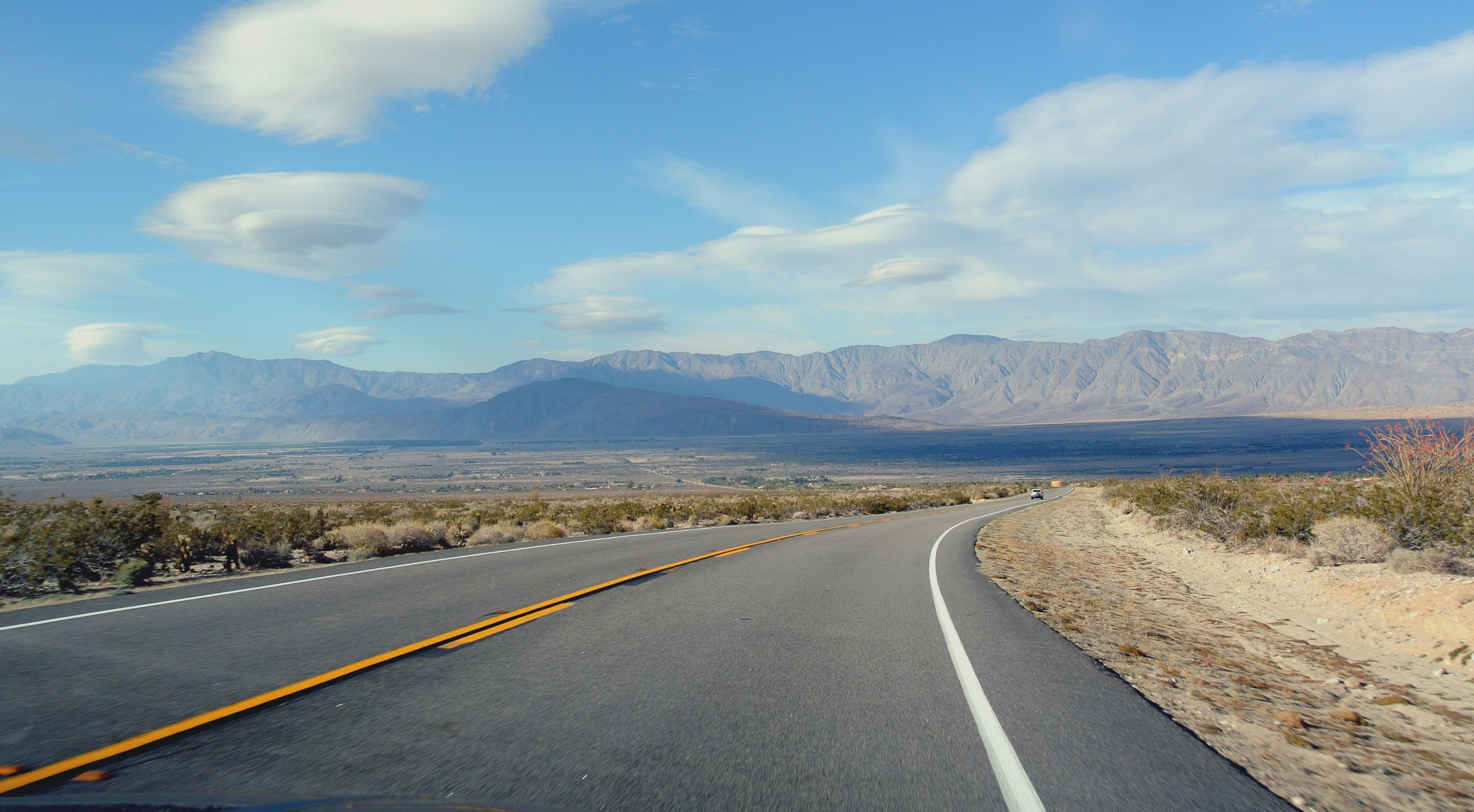
SR 78 in Anza-Borrego Desert State Park, looking east

As it nears Blythe, the highway makes a sharp turn east onto 32nd Avenue before turning north on Rannels Boulevard. It makes a right on 28th Avenue before turning north on South Neighbours Boulevard and passing through Ripley. SR 78 continues north for a few more miles to its terminus at I-10, approximately seven miles (11 km) west of the Arizona border. North of I-10, Neighbours Boulevard becomes Interstate 10 Business for a block before the business route turns east toward Blythe.

SR 78 is designated as the Ronald Packard Parkway (after a former Congressman named Ronald Packard from the area) from I-5 in the city of Oceanside to I-15 in the city of Escondido, and Ben Hulse Highway (after a former state senator named Ben Hulse) from SR 86 near Brawley to I-10 near the city of Blythe. The portion of SR 78 from SR 86 in Brawley to CR S3 near Anza-Borrego Desert State Park is designated as part of the Juan Bautista de Anza National Historic Trail auto tour route, promoted by the National Park Service. An informal nickname for the road is "the Hops Highway," referring to the fact that the 60-mile (97 km) stretch of SR 78 from Oceanside to Julian passes by one-third of all the breweries in San Diego County.

SR 78 is part of the California Freeway and Expressway System, although only the metropolitan section of SR 78 is a freeway. The section of SR 78 from the western junction of SR 79 to the western junction with SR 86 is designated by the California State Legislature as eligible by law for the State Scenic Highway System; however, only the section in Anza-Borrego Desert State Park has officially been designated by Caltrans as being part of the system, meaning that it is a substantial section of highway passing through a "memorable landscape" with no "visual intrusions", where the potential designation has gained popular favor with the community; it gained this status in 1971. SR 78 from I-5 to I-15, and from the eastern junction with SR 86 to the eastern junction with SR 111 is part of the National Highway System (NHS), a network of highways that are considered essential to the country's economy, defense, and mobility by the Federal Highway Administration. In 2013, SR 78 had an annual average daily traffic (AADT) of 670 between the San Diego–Imperial county line and the western SR 86 junction, and 163,000 between Twin Oaks Valley Road and Nordahl Road, the latter of which was the highest AADT for the highway.

== History ==
=== Original highway ===
The Old Banner Toll Road connected the towns of Julian and Banner in 1871, after a gold rush began in 1870, and eliminated the need to manually lower supplies to gold miners down a 1,000-foot (300 m) slope. The county bought the road from Horace Wilcox in 1874, and removed the toll. The road remained in service until 1925, and remained operational until a flood in the winter season of 1979–1980. By August 1874, a road from Valle de las Viejas to Julian was open and accessible for horse teams. In the meantime, the City of Oceanside began discussions regarding a road east from Oceanside through the San Marcos valley. Efforts to realign the road from Ramona to Julian began in 1892, when a county surveyor examined the prospect of shifting the road away from the Graves hill.

Before the designation of SR 78, a road known as the Brawley-Westmorland-Julian-Oceanside Highway (connecting Oceanside, Escondido, Ramona, Julian, Westmorland, and Brawley) existed during the early twentieth century. This road roughly followed the current routing of SR 78 from Escondido to the east of Brawley, although it traveled along a different routing from Westmorland into Brawley. No road connected Brawley with Glamis in 1919; it was necessary to travel north through Calipatria to reach Blythe. East of the Sand Hills, there was a road from Glamis passing by Smith Well into Palo Verde, which roughly follows the routing of SR 78.

At this time, when the road from the west into Julian had been approved, many in the community began discussing a road east into the Imperial Valley. There were many proposed alignments besides the one east of Julian through Banner, including through the San Felipe Valley, and the Montezuma Valley. The plan was to construct the Santa Ysabel grade portion as a gravel road, and the rest of the road between Ballena (near Ramona) and Julian as a concrete road. The work to pave the road from Santa Ysabel to Julian was nearing completion in September 1920. Grading was completed by August 1921, and paving work continued, as well as grading on the Santa Ysabel and Julian grades. In 1922, the Automobile Club of Southern California scouting expedition reported that the road from Ramona to Julian was "in excellent condition" though the pavement was poor from Ballena to Santa Ysabel, and under construction just east of Santa Ysabel.

A road from Julian to Kane Springs was completed in 1925. Efforts to include this road extending to Brawley into the state highway system date back from 1927, in order to receive state funding for the road. Plans for a cross-country road through Borrego Springs were being discussed by county government officials in 1927, as there were no east–west state highways in between Mountain Springs and Riverside. Those living in Calipatria and Westmorland supported the prospect of the road to Julian being improved, and included in the state highway system. In 1928, state assembly member Myron Witter wrote a letter to the San Diego County Board of Supervisors to suggest that the highway be incorporated as a second entrance to the county from the east, and that it would not detract from the progress of the other highway from El Centro; however, the county wanted to prioritize the paving over the designation. Chambers of commerce in the Imperial Valley generally agreed with Witter, proposing that the El Centro–Calexico road be made a part of the state highway system, and the Kane Springs–Julian road be given second priority for inclusion.

In June 1930, an agreement was made between the county and the state to share in the construction and maintenance on the road to Kane Springs from Julian; prison crews were to make up some of the workforce. Vista Way opened on November 26, 1930. By 1932, the road from Escondido to Ramona was a gravel road, and the portion from Julian to U.S. Route 99 (US 99), which is currently designated as SR 86, was still a dirt road. That year, the cost was predicted to be $176,000 (about $3.38 million in 2025 dollars).

=== Construction in San Diego County ===
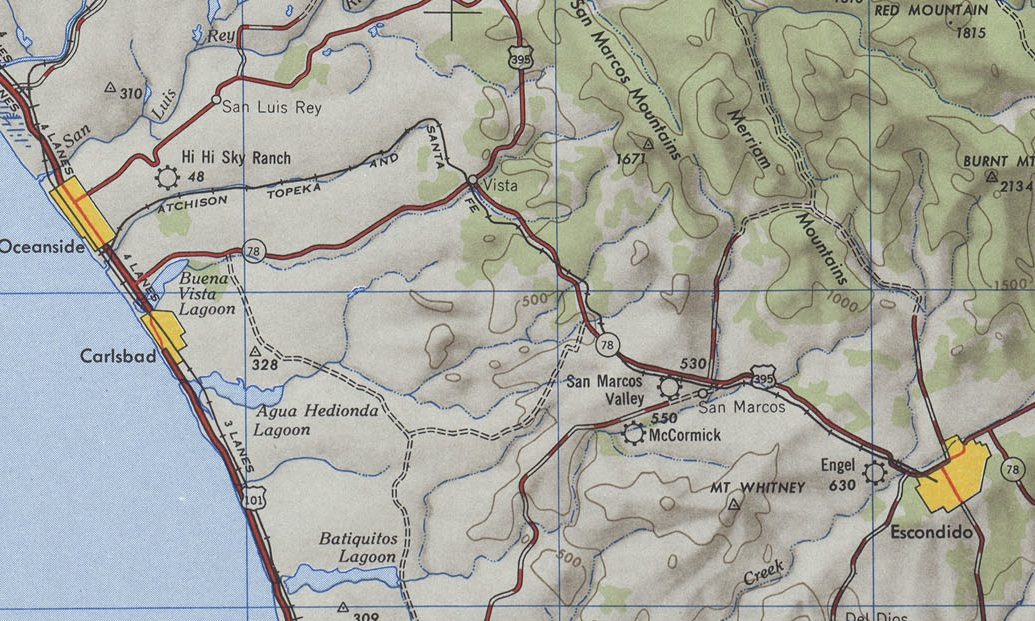
SR 78 in 1947 before its freeway alignment was built

SR 78 was originally formed along with the originally signed state highways in California (Sign Routes) in 1934; however, it only extended to what was then US 99 near Kane Springs. In the North County, SR 78 was legislatively designated as Route 196 from then-US 101 (present-day I-5) to Vista, and as Route 77 from Vista to US 395 in Escondido. SR 78 was legally known as Route 197 from Escondido to Ramona, and Route 198 from Ramona to US 99, which is now SR 86. From the eastern junction of SR 86 to the Riverside county line, the route was designated as Route 146 in 1959.

By 1947, US 395 ran concurrently along the portion of SR 78 from Vista to Escondido before continuing along Santa Fe Avenue to Bonsall and Fallbrook and rejoining its alignment during the 1970s. At this time, all of SR 78 that existed had been paved. Before the present-day freeway was built, SR 78 was routed on the Vista Way Freeway (which was an expressway) from Oceanside east to downtown Vista. After this, it followed Santa Fe Avenue and Mission Road east (now signed as CR S14), continuing onto Grand Avenue in Escondido. Following the intersection with US 395, SR 78 turned south on Ash Street and rejoined the current alignment of the highway. In 1949, the rerouting of SR 78 from US 395 to US 99 was listed as a priority by local officials. The road was known for its curves, even though it went over relatively flat terrain; this reduced its efficiency.

The 3.5-mile (5.6 km) portion of the SR 78 freeway in Oceanside opened to traffic on February 11, 1954. This highway was extended to Vista in May 1955, at a cost of $1,159,000 (about $10.9 million in 2025 dollars). The part of the freeway from Vista to Escondido was one of the top priorities for highway construction in the county as early as 1960. The center portion of the Vista Way Freeway opened in April 1962, but the western part of the route was not entirely access controlled, as an expressway. The section of the SR 78 freeway from Rancho Santa Fe Road in San Marcos to Nordahl Road was completed in April 1962. The part of the freeway connecting Rancho Santa Fe Road to the Vista portion opened in February 1963, at a cost of $3.9 million (about $31.4 million in 2025 dollars). The opening of the freeway was credited with helping to bring 315 jobs to San Marcos in 1963. The rest of the freeway between Nordahl Road and US 395 opened on December 21, 1964, providing a four-lane highway from Escondido to Oceanside; the segment cost $1,865,000 (about $15 million in 2025 dollars). SR 78 was officially designated in the 1964 state highway renumbering.

The San Diego Chamber of Commerce and the San Diego Highway Development Association urged for the conversion of SR 78 west of Vista, a length of 5.6 miles (9.0 km), from an expressway to a freeway in April 1967. The College Boulevard diamond interchange on this western segment was scheduled to open to traffic on October 24, 1967, and connected the recently relocated MiraCosta College to the freeway. The interchange, previously an at-grade intersection, improved traffic flow to the college by removing the left turn across the highway needed to access it. The construction of the interchange cost $800,941 (about $5.89 million in 2025 dollars). May 1968 saw the state designating the Jefferson Street and Emerald Drive interchanges as a priority. In August 1968, the state allocated $750,000 (about $5.29 million in 2025 dollars) for building the Jefferson Street interchange. Further funding difficulties were encountered due to US 395 being given priority, but both interchanges had funding by August 1970.

The construction of the Emerald Drive interchange was scheduled for the year 1971. While the El Camino Real interchange was already a diamond interchange, the state planned to add traffic signals to the ramps to accommodate more congestion from the nearby mall. The Emerald Drive interchange was completed in September, and the rest of the project was to be completed by the end of the year, leaving Jefferson Drive as the only remaining traffic signal. Construction on the Jefferson Street interchange began in early 1972; the section from I-5 east to Melrose Drive (along the routing of the Vista Way Freeway) had been upgraded to full freeway standards as of 1973.

=== Glamis Road ===
Plans to construct a road from Brawley to Glamis date from 1953; the road would provide improved access to two newer state parks. The ceding of the Chocolate Mountains to the U.S. Navy had closed a north–south road traversing Imperial County, and the government needed to restore a corridor for local residents to use, as the road was closed during the day for five days a week. However, in August, the Riverside Chamber of Commerce opposed the construction, even though it would replace the Niland–Blythe road. The chamber reversed its stance in December, as the road would mostly be constructed in Imperial County.

To construct the road, the House Armed Services Committee voted to allocate $660,000 (about $5.78 million in 2025 dollars) for the Navy to give to Imperial County to construct it in February 1956. The House Appropriations Committee bundled it with 616 other projects, however, which President Dwight Eisenhower vetoed in mid-July. The allocation was eventually approved by both Congress and Eisenhower a few weeks later. The San Diego Union and the Evening Tribune (later merged to form the Union-Tribune) were recognized by the San Diego county supervisors for their role in winning congressional support for the funding.

There was a brief delay in approving the money in February 1957 when there was a proposal to move the gunnery range. However, at the end of the month, the United States Navy obtained ownership from Imperial County of the old Niland–Blythe road running through the Chocolate Mountain Aerial Gunnery Range for the specified amount. The county then used this money to fund the construction of the Glamis Road, which Ben Hulse predicted would become a state highway. This portion of the road was specifically designed to address the challenges of building it through sand dunes. The engineers routed the highway according to the terrain and made cuts in the sand up to 80 feet (24 m) deep. The routing roughly followed an old Native American trail that went from the Imperial Valley to the Palo Verde Valley. According to an Imperial County official, the road was predicted to be more busy than US 80 and to bring traffic to San Diego directly from Needles and US 66.

The Glamis road opened in August 1958, and the road from Glamis to Palo Verde was under construction at that time; the part of the road that was already open was dedicated in October. In 1959, the rest of the current routing of SR 78 between Brawley and Palo Verde was added to the state highway system as SR 195 and Legislative Route 146. The state legislature added the portion of SR 78 from SR 115 to the Riverside County line in the 1964 state highway renumbering, also naming the road the Ben Hulse Highway. In March 1964, the Ben Hulse Highway leading to Palo Verde was dedicated, and state senator Hulse's efforts to have the road built were recognized. Following this, in 1965, the newly constructed section was signed as CR S78. The section from Palo Verde to Blythe shows up as part of SR 78 on maps as early as 1965, and the section from southwest of Midway Well to Palo Verde is shown as part of SR 78 as early as 1966.

=== North County freeway expansion ===
In 1969, plans to extend the freeway portion of SR 78 east from the Broadway interchange through Escondido were delayed by Caltrans director Jacob Dekema due to a lack of funding until 1980. However, in 1970, the community raised concerns about the number of buildings that would need to be destroyed, as the freeway would go through a dense urban area. Other routes, including routing SR 78 along I-15 south, were proposed. The majority of the Escondido City Council supported sending representatives to the upcoming California Coastal Commission meeting in January 1971 to expedite the process of construction.

A month later, an environmental study was conducted that focused on the possibilities of rerouting the proposed freeway. In April 1972, the majority of voters supported a referendum that halted plans to build the SR 78 freeway through the city of Escondido. The city then turned its focus to widening Lincoln Avenue and Ash Street instead, and also requested that the routing of SR 78 be moved to Broadway, Washington Avenue, and Ash Street from Grand Avenue to improve traffic flow. Five years later, signs were installed on eastbound SR 78, directing traffic headed for the San Diego Zoo Safari Park to use I-15 south to Via Rancho Parkway instead of continuing eastbound, to bypass the Escondido traffic.

City officials expressed a desire to have SR 78 included in the Interstate Highway System in 1985, but this was determined unlikely to succeed by state senator William Craven. In September, the state government agreed to pay $7.5 million (about $19 million in 2025 dollars) for the widening between Oceanside and Escondido, but the county and the five cities the route ran through would have to pay for the rest of the cost. The San Diego County Board of Supervisors endorsed the project that month, in order to have the best chance at getting federal funding. A spike in accidents during that year led to Representative Ron Packard proposing a way to split the costs between the governments; there were 387 accidents from January to August 1985, a sharp increase from 234 in 1984. In recognition for his work obtaining funding, SR 78 between Oceanside and Escondido was named the Ronald Packard Parkway in 2000.

The House Public Works and Transportation Subcommittee allocated $12 million (about $18.7 million in 2025 dollars) in a bill during June 1986. The Senate raised an issue over the 65-mile-per-hour (105 km/h) speed limit in October, which made the outcome dubious. The House and Senate eventually settled on a version of the bill in March 1987, only to have President Ronald Reagan veto the bill due to "pork barrel" spending. Congress passed the bill in April 1987, overriding Reagan's veto, in the same legislation that allowed for rural Interstates to have a speed limit of up to 65 miles per hour (105 km/h). The bill authorized $15 million (about $36.4 million in 2025 dollars) in federal funding, and the cities of Oceanside, Carlsbad, Vista, San Marcos, and Escondido agreed to pay $6 million (about $14.6 million in 2025 dollars); the total cost was $30 million (about $72.8 million in 2025 dollars). Caltrans predicted that without the widening project, traffic speeds on SR 78 would be as low as 15 miles per hour (24 km/h) by the year 2000 because of congestion. A public relations campaign had begun to garner public support for the project, including bumper stickers saying "I hate 78".

The widening project began construction on April 14, 1989, with the first project adding two lanes between San Marcos Boulevard and I-15. Additional funding was secured with a local sales tax increase in 1987, providing $80 million (about $181 million in 2025 dollars), and an additional $7.8 million (about $17.6 million in 2025 dollars) from the California Transportation Commission. By March 1991, another part of the project from College Boulevard to Melrose Drive began the bidding process. The next year, the project began to wind down, with bidding on the final part of the work between Nordahl Road and I-15. The widening was complete by the beginning of 1994.

=== Upgrades and improvements ===
Several projects took place following the completion of the widening project. A realignment project took place in 1994 to remove one of the curves in the San Pasqual Valley, at a cost of $2.5 million (about $4.92 million in 2025 dollars). The San Marcos Boulevard interchange was renovated beginning in late 1996, but encountered difficulties in the land acquisition process. Work resumed in 1999, and was expected to be finished by 2000, at a cost of $10 million; the benefits of decreased congestion came into effect once the new westbound offramp was opened. The Twin Oaks Valley Road interchange was another subject of contention, as the state Assembly refused to fund the project with $5.1 million (about $9.49 million in 2025 dollars) in April 1997. However, in June 1998, the California Transportation Commission approved the funding after the San Diego Association of Governments officially requested it. Construction began in August 1999, and was scheduled to end in 2001.

A new interchange with Vista Village Drive was opened in 1998, and the College Boulevard interchange in Oceanside was revised along westbound SR 78, at a cost of $5.5 million (about $10.1 million in 2025 dollars). In addition to this, a new interchange was constructed at Las Posas Road in San Marcos, which opened in 2006. According to the U-T San Diego (the renamed San Diego Union-Tribune), SR 78 at Barham Drive was the worst "traffic bottleneck" in the county between 2010 and 2012. Thus, the interchange at Nordahl Road was also improved, and extra lanes were to be added between Nordahl Road and I-15; construction commenced in early 2012, and the new bridge opened in November. The project cost $41 million.

In the late 2000s, planning began for a bypass around the downtown portion of the city of Brawley. An expressway would carry the routing of SR 78 north and east of the city, with an interchange at SR 111, before intersecting with the current alignment of SR 78. A Swedish company began construction on this bypass in April 2008; the first phase consisted of the portion of the bypass that is solely SR 111. The second phase of the bypass, from the western junction with SR 111 to the eastern junction with SR 78, lasted from February 2008 to June 2011. On the third phase of the project, from the junction with SR 86 west of Brawley to the western end of the completed bypass, construction began in late 2010. This project was identified in August 2010 as a project that could be affected by California state budget cuts. The Brawley Bypass, as it was known, opened on October 30, 2012.

== Future ==
The western portion of SR 78 in North County is currently slated for several improvements. There were plans to construct an additional interchange at Rancho Del Oro Road in Oceanside; however, the Oceanside City Council decided to cancel these plans in 2005, despite studies suggesting that this move would be detrimental to the traffic in the region. The city council reinstated those plans in September 2012.

There are also plans to improve the interchange with I-5, which currently involves a traffic signal connecting Vista Way and SR 78 with the ramps to I-5 southbound. Plans call for adding more lanes to I-5 and SR 78 as well as for the construction of a new ramp from SR 78 westbound to I-5 southbound and from I-5 southbound to SR 78 eastbound. The nearby lagoon has served as an obstacle in constructing additional ramps. In 2002, the I-5 northbound to SR 78 eastbound ramp was widened to two lanes to ease congestion. At a 2015 meeting, the Oceanside community expressed concerns about a potential "flyover" ramp design for the new interchange. The project is scheduled for completion in the late 2020s.

A 2011 Caltrans report proposed adding two high-occupancy vehicle lanes to the freeway portion of SR 78 between I-5 and I-15 to accommodate increased traffic. In early 2016, the mayor of San Marcos stated that there were plans to add another lane in each direction to SR 78 through parts of the city.

== Major intersections ==
Except where prefixed with a letter, postmiles were measured on the road as it was in 1964, based on the alignment that existed at the time, and do not necessarily reflect current mileage. Postmile prefixes include: R reflecting a realignment in the route since then, M indicating a second realignment, L referring to an overlap due to a correction or change, and T indicating postmiles classified as temporary. Segments that remain unconstructed or have been relinquished to local control may be omitted. The numbers reset at county lines; the start and end postmiles in each county are given in the county column.

County	Location	Postmile	Exit	Destinations	Notes
San Diego; SD 0.00-95.31	Oceanside	0.00		Vista Way	Continuation beyond I-5; I-5 north exit 51C, south exit 51B
San Diego; SD 0.00-95.31	Oceanside	0.00	1A-B	I-5 (San Diego Freeway) – Los Angeles, San Diego	Partial cloverleaf interchange; west end of freeway; western terminus; no exit numbers eastbound; signed as exits 1A (south) and 1B (north) westbound; I-5 exit 51B
San Diego; SD 0.00-95.31	Oceanside	0.74	1C	Jefferson Street	Signed as exit 1 eastbound
San Diego; SD 0.00-95.31	Oceanside	1.50	2	El Camino Real (CR S11)	
San Diego; SD 0.00-95.31	Oceanside	3.32	3	College Boulevard	
San Diego; SD 0.00-95.31	Oceanside	3.58	4A	Plaza Drive	Eastbound exit and westbound entrance
San Diego; SD 0.00-95.31	Vista	4.38	4B	Emerald Drive	Signed as exit 4 westbound
San Diego; SD 0.00-95.31	Vista	5.94	6A	Melrose Drive	Eastbound exit and westbound entrance
San Diego; SD 0.00-95.31	Vista	R6.19	6B	Vista Village Drive (CR S13)	Signed as exit 6 westbound
San Diego; SD 0.00-95.31	Vista	6.94	7	Civic Center Drive	Formerly named Escondido Avenue
San Diego; SD 0.00-95.31	Vista	7.71	8	Mar Vista Drive	
San Diego; SD 0.00-95.31	Vista	9.08	9	Sycamore Avenue	
San Diego; SD 0.00-95.31	San Marcos	10.61	11A	Rancho Santa Fe Road (CR S10)	
San Diego; SD 0.00-95.31	San Marcos	11.18	11B	Las Posas Road	
San Diego; SD 0.00-95.31	San Marcos	12.13	12	San Marcos Boulevard (CR S12)	
San Diego; SD 0.00-95.31	San Marcos	12.91	13	Twin Oaks Valley Road	
San Diego; SD 0.00-95.31	San Marcos	14.24	14	Barham Drive / Woodland Parkway	
San Diego; SD 0.00-95.31	San Marcos–Escondido line	15.49	15	Nordahl Road	
San Diego; SD 0.00-95.31	Escondido	R16.54	17A-B	I-15 (Escondido Freeway) – Riverside, San Diego	Signed as exits 17A (south) and 17B (north) eastbound, exit 17 westbound; I-15 exit 32
San Diego; SD 0.00-95.31	Escondido	R17.27	17C	Centre City Parkway (I-15 BL) – Central Escondido	Eastbound exit and westbound entrance; former US 395
San Diego; SD 0.00-95.31	Escondido	N17.68	East end of freeway		
San Diego; SD 0.00-95.31	Escondido	N17.68		Broadway north / Lincoln Parkway	At-grade intersection
San Diego; SD 0.00-95.31	Escondido	T19.27		Valley Parkway (CR S6) - Valley Center, Palomar Mountain, Downtown Escondido	
San Diego; SD 0.00-95.31	Ramona	35.52		SR 67 south (Main Street west) – El Cajon	
San Diego; SD 0.00-95.31		41.96		Sutherland Dam Road – Lake Sutherland	
San Diego; SD 0.00-95.31	Santa Ysabel	51.11		SR 79 north / Washington Street – Lake Henshaw, Warner Springs, Hemet	West end of SR 79 overlap
San Diego; SD 0.00-95.31	Julian	58.13		SR 79 south – Lake Cuyamaca, Cuyamaca Park	East end of SR 79 overlap
San Diego; SD 0.00-95.31		69.69		CR S2 south (Great Southern Overland Stage Route of 1849) to I-8 – Ocotillo	West end of CR S2 overlap
San Diego; SD 0.00-95.31		70.01		CR S2 north (San Felipe Road) – Warner Springs, Hemet	East end of CR S2 overlap
San Diego; SD 0.00-95.31		76.84		CR S3 north (Yaqui Pass Road) – Borrego Springs	
Imperial; IMP 0.00-80.74		13.17 43.56 (Note: Indicates that the postmile represents the distance along SR 86 rather than SR 78.)		SR 86 north – Indio	West end of SR 86 overlap
Imperial; IMP 0.00-80.74	Westmorland	27.51		CR S30 (Center Street)	
Imperial; IMP 0.00-80.74	Westmorland			CR S26 east (Boarts Road)	Western terminus of CR S26
Imperial; IMP 0.00-80.74				SR 86 south	East end of SR 86 overlap; west end of Brawley bypass; former SR 78 east
Imperial; IMP 0.00-80.74	Brawley			SR 111 north / Old Highway 111 south	Interchange; west end of SR 111 overlap
Imperial; IMP 0.00-80.74	Brawley	15.04		SR 111 south – Calexico	East end of SR 111 overlap; east end of Brawley bypass
Imperial; IMP 0.00-80.74		18.65		SR 115 north (West Road) – Calipatria	West end of SR 115 overlap
Imperial; IMP 0.00-80.74		21.02		SR 115 south – Holtville	East end of SR 115 overlap
Imperial; IMP 0.00-80.74				CR S32 south (Butters Road) – Holtville	Northern terminus of CR S32
Imperial; IMP 0.00-80.74				CR S33 south (Green Road)	Northern terminus of CR S33
Imperial; IMP 0.00-80.74		52.35		CR S34 south (Ogilby Road) – Ogilby	
Riverside; RIV 0.00-16.17	Blythe	16.17		I-10	Interchange; eastern terminus; I-10 exit 236
Riverside; RIV 0.00-16.17	Blythe	16.17		Neighbours Boulevard north (I-10 BL east)	Continuation beyond I-10
1.000 mi = 1.609 km; 1.000 km = 0.621 mi: Concurrency terminus; Incomplete access
