= Cal State San Marcos station =

Light rail station in San Marcos, California, United States

Cal State San Marcos
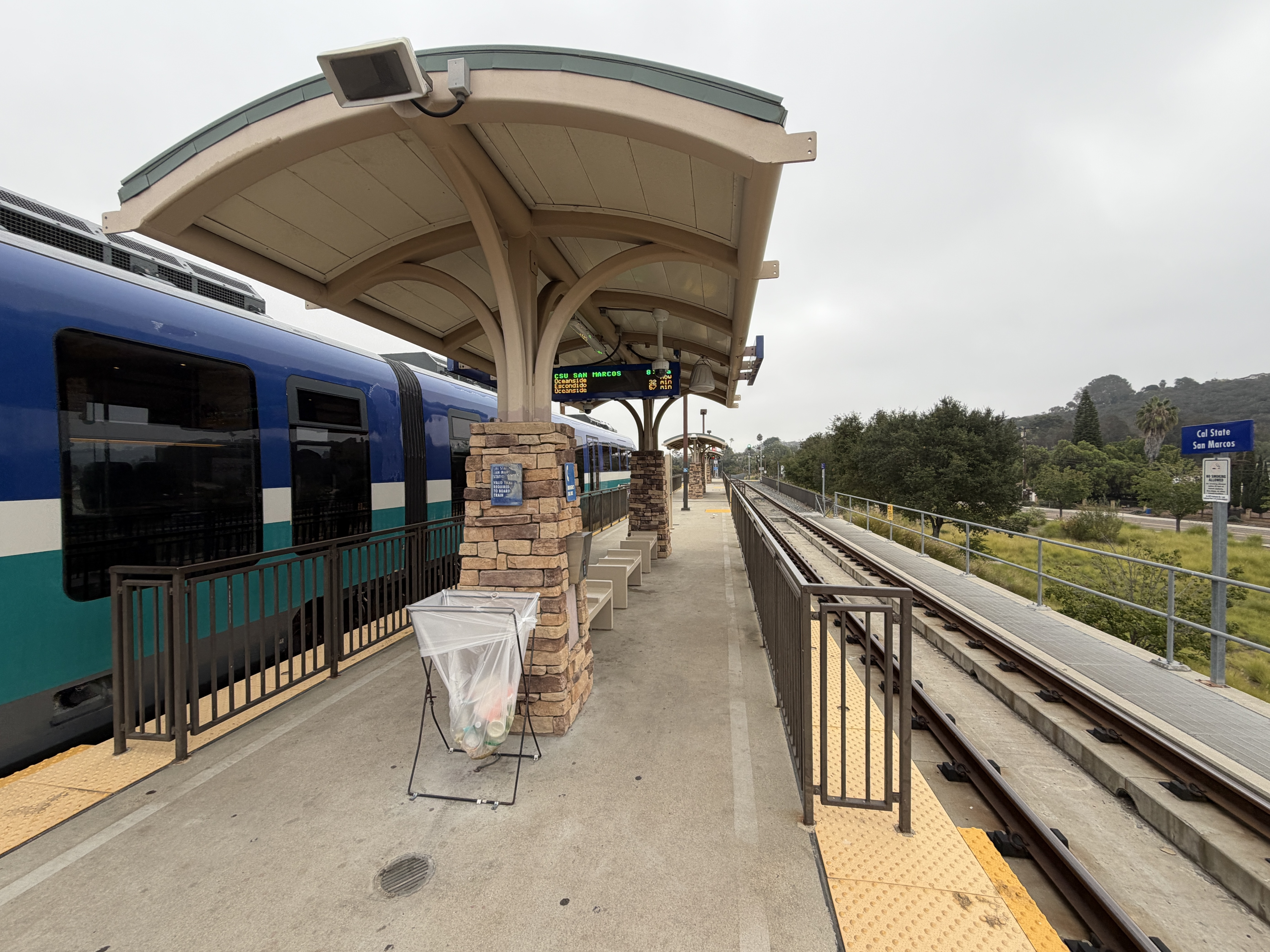
- Cal State San Marcos station in 2025

General information
- Location: 410 La Moree Road; San Marcos, California
- Coordinates: 33°08′05″N 117°09′13″W
- Owner: North County Transit District
- Line: Escondido Subdivision
- Platforms: 1 island platform
- Tracks: 2
- Connections: NCTD Breeze: 347; NCTD+: San Marcos Zone

Construction
- Structure type: Elevated
- Accessible: Yes

History
- Opened: March 9, 2008

Services
Preceding station	North County Transit District	Following station
San Marcos Civic Center toward Oceanside	SPRINTER	Nordahl Road toward Escondido
Location

Cal State San Marcos station is an elevated railway station in San Marcos, California, the only such station along the North County Transit District's SPRINTER hybrid rail line. The station sits on a loop of the San Diego Northern Railway's Escondido Subdivision that crosses over State Route 78 to serve the California State University, San Marcos campus, which is located southwest of the station. On campus days, shuttle services are available to ferry students from the train station to the heart of the CSUSM campus and vice versa.
