= California State Route 195 =

Highway in California

State Route 195

- The 1972 routing of SR 195 highlighted in red

Route information
- Maintained by Caltrans
- Length: 7.42 mi (11.94 km)
- Existed: 1963–2014

Major junctions
- West end: Harrison Street near Oasis
- East end: SR 111 in Mecca

Location
- Country: United States
- State: California
- County: Riverside

Highway system
- State highways in California; Interstate; US; State; Scenic; History; Pre‑1964; Unconstructed; Deleted; Freeways
← SR 193	→ SR 196

State Route 195 (SR 195) was a state highway in the U.S. state of California, branching westward from SR 111 to SR 86 near the town of Mecca and the Salton Sea. The route formerly extended east to Interstate 10 (I-10) near Joshua Tree National Park as a longer route extending to Blythe and points further east. After the main route was shifted north, the older route remained as an alternate known as Box Canyon Road. The route was designated in the 1964 state highway renumbering, although the Box Canyon Road portion was removed as a state highway in 1972. Following the construction of the SR 86 expressway, SR 195 was curtailed in 2009, and removed entirely in 2014.

== Route description ==
Route 195 remains defined as follows in section 495 of the California Streets and Highways Code, last amended by the California State Legislature in 1981: "Route 195 is from Route 86 near Oasis to Route 111 near Mecca via Pierce Street and Avenue 66. This route shall cease to be a state highway when Route 86 Expressway is constructed from near Oasis to Route 10."

Before the route was mostly removed in 2009, it began at Harrison Street, the old routing of SR 86, in Riverside County. It then headed north as Pierce Street until intersecting 66th Street, where SR 195 turned east. The highway intersected SR 86 and continued to the town of Mecca, where it met its north end at SR 111. The route loosely paralleled the northern end of the Salton Sea, passing through farmland for its entire length.

In 2013, SR 195 had an annual average daily traffic (AADT) of 4,500 vehicles at Buchanan Street, and 6,000 vehicles at the eastern terminus with SR 111, the latter of which was the highest AADT for the highway.

== History ==
Route 64, a highway from Mecca to Blythe, was added to the state highway system in 1919. In 1935, Pierce Street from Route 26 near Oasis to Avenue 66, and Avenue 66 from Route 26 to Mecca were added to the state highway system. Two years later, Pierce Street was designated as Route 203, and Avenue 66 was designated as Route 204. By 1926, the road existed east of Mecca to Blythe, but was unpaved; by 1930, the road connected from Mecca to the road along the western side of the Salton Sea to Indio and points further west.

Between 1932 and 1934, the road east of Mecca had been paved. The western part of the road, known as the Box Canyon road, from Mecca to Blythe served as part of US 60 and US 70 until it was eventually bypassed in favor of a more direct route to Indio, diverging at Shavers' Summit. Between 1934 and 1936, US 60 and US 70 had made the shift north towards Indio, and the portion between US 99 and Mecca was paved. Initial opposition was later overcome after the road was washed out during a storm and forced motorists to take refuge in the nearby foothills. By 1940, the SR 195 designation was signed. In the 1940s, the highway continued due west of Mecca to end at an intersection with US 99, rather than turning south.

In 1953, efforts to remove the road from Mecca to the highway from Blythe to Indio, from the state highway system were met with community opposition, since it served as an alternate route for the other highway. State Senator Nelson S. Dilworth proposed legislation to require the road from Banning through Idyllwild to Mountain Center (now SR 243) to be added to the state highway system if SR 195 was removed, as the two were of roughly the same length, but the latter remained in the system.

SR 195 was officially designated in the 1964 state highway renumbering. The original alignment continued past SR 111 and the Salton Sea before ending at US 60, which later became I-10, at the southern end of Joshua Tree National Park. The Division of Highways proposed deleting this part of the state highway in 1971, though similar plans had been revived in 1969. This portion was removed in 1972.

In 1988, the California Transportation Commission (CTC) approved shifting SR 111 onto the new SR 86 expressway after it was completed, using SR 195 to make the connection. When the SR 86 expressway was fully constructed, SR 195 was to be removed from the state highway system according to state law; that expressway was finished in 2001. However, this removed the connection from the highway portion of SR 111 to the new expressway carrying both SR 111 and SR 86 north from the state highway system. Caltrans officially deleted most of SR 195 in 2009, leaving a gap in SR 111 following deletions of the old routing that was now bypassed by the expressway. In December 2014, with Riverside County and Caltrans both supporting, the CTC transferred the remaining portion of SR 195, from the new SR 86 expressway to SR 111, to become part of SR 111. SR 195 still appears in Caltrans documents dated from 2014. And the highway remains defined in section 495 of the California Streets and Highways Code, last amended by the California State Legislature in 1981.

== Major intersections ==
Except where prefixed with a letter, postmiles were measured on the road as it was when the route was established, based on the 1972 routing, and do not necessarily reflect current mileage. Postmile prefixes include: R reflecting a realignment in the route since then, M indicating a second realignment, L referring to an overlap due to a correction or change, and T indicating postmiles classified as temporary. Segments that remain unconstructed or have been relinquished to local control may be omitted. The entire route was in Riverside County.

Location	Postmile	Destinations	Notes
	R0.00	Harrison Street	South end of SR 195; former US 99; former SR 86
		SR 86	
Mecca	7.42	SR 111	North end of SR 195
1.000 mi = 1.609 km; 1.000 km = 0.621 mi
