= Calexico West Port of Entry =

Border crossing between Mexico and the U.S.

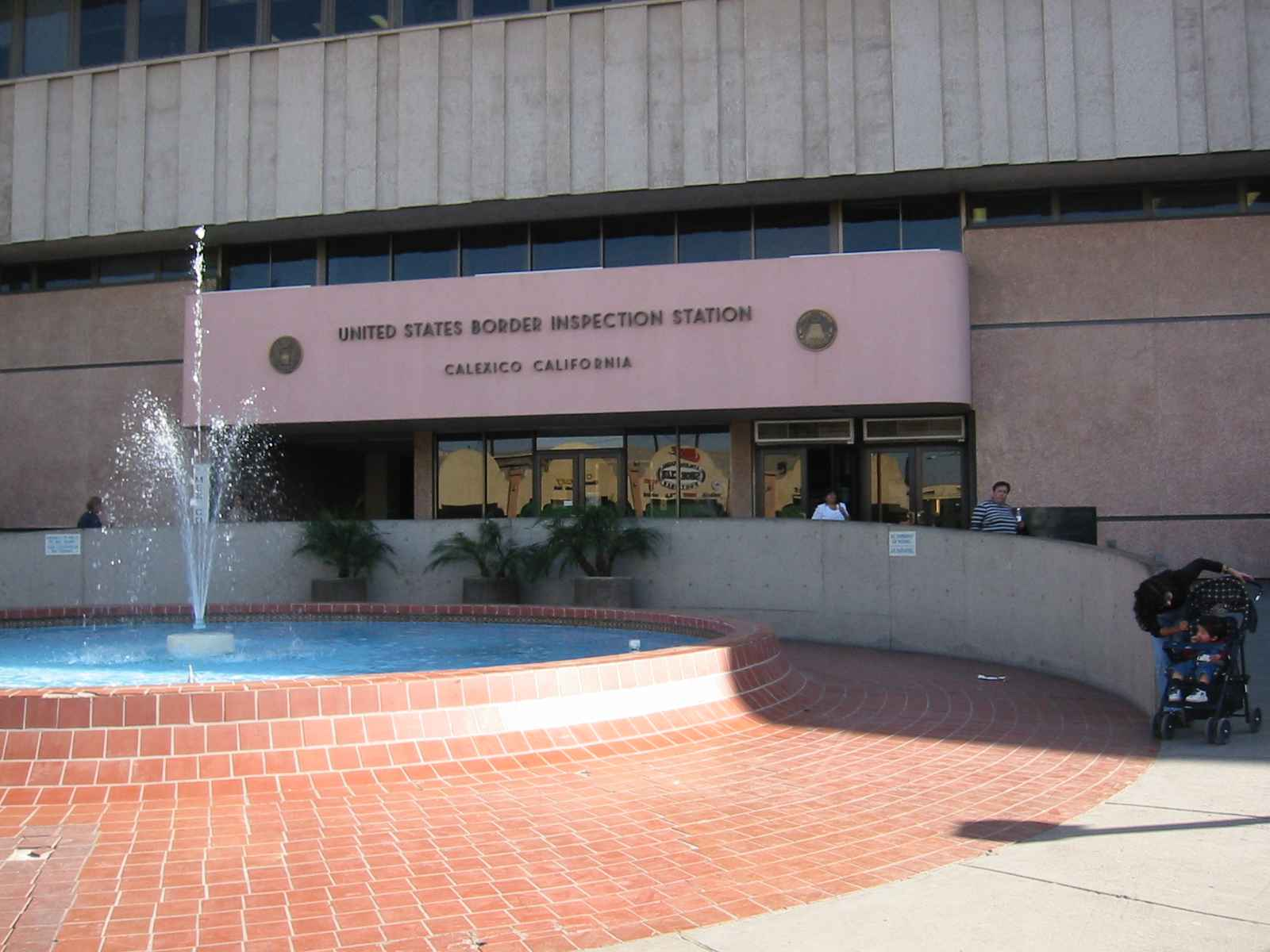
- Calexico West Border Inspection Station

Location
- Country: United States
- Location: 200 East First Street, Calexico, California 92231
- Coordinates: 32.665106°N 115.496349°W

Details
- Opened: 1902

Statistics
- 2011 Cars: 7,099,725
- 2011 Trucks: 0
- Pedestrians: 4,451,119

Website
- http://www.cbp.gov/contact/ports/calexico-west-class
- US Inspection Station-Calexico
- U.S. National Register of Historic Places
- NRHP reference No.: 91001749
- Added to NRHP: February 14, 1992

The Calexico West Port of Entry (formerly known simply as the Calexico Port of Entry, and sometimes called the "Downtown" port of entry) is one of two ports of entry in the Imperial Valley area of California. It is located in the business center of the Calexico-Mexicali metropolitan area that is divided by an international boundary. This crossing has access north to Interstate 8 via California State Route 111. Mexican Federal Highway 5 then begins its journey to the south. The General Services Administration is currently implementing a multi-year facility upgrade that will dramatically change the appearance and throughput of the border crossing.

== History ==
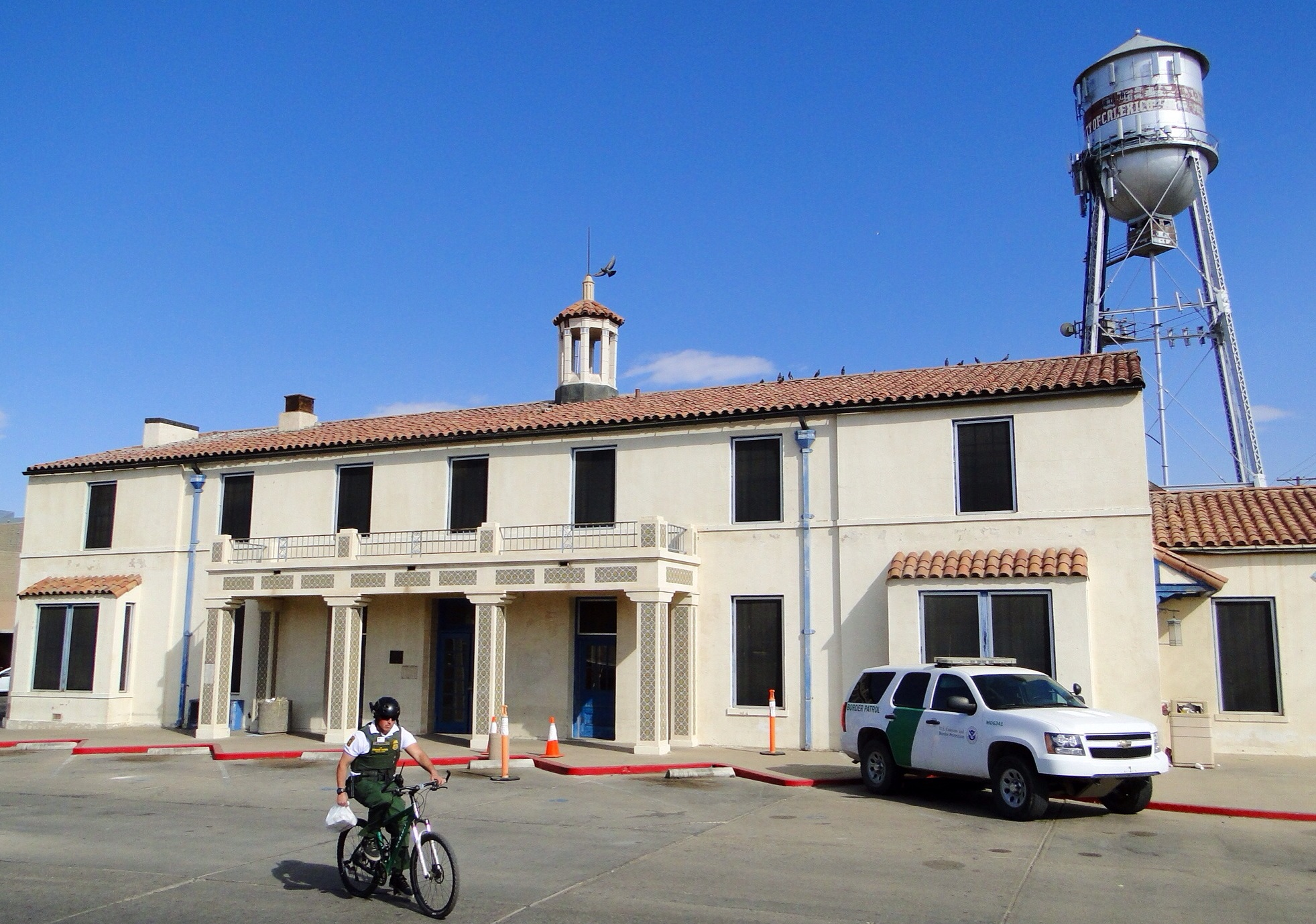
The 1933 historic Calexico border inspection station on Heffernan Avenue

There has been a border crossing at Calexico since the late 19th century. The area grew substantially when irrigation converted the barren Imperial Valley into fertile agricultural land. Irrigation happened as a direct result of a huge flood (combined with topsoil) in 1906 when the Colorado River burst its channel due to the California Development Company's poor engineering. Enter George Chaffey and his Imperial Land Company who solved the flood problem and laid out the towns of Calexico, El Centro, Imperial, and Mexicali. So with his work he was allowed to name the valley as the Imperial Valley.

The historic border inspection station on Heffernan Avenue was built in 1933. It was listed on the U.S. National Register of Historic Places in 1992, and remains today as US government office space. In 1974, a new port of entry was built two blocks to the west, adjacent to the international rail crossing. In 2018, a new port of entry was opened next to the New River with modern installations, but for now is used for vehicles. The pedestrian port has not changed; however, there are plans to modernize the pedestrian port, including use of the old building of the first port of entry for a temporary pedestrian port to rebuild a new one.

== See also ==
- List of Mexico–United States border crossings
