= Banner, California =

Banner
- Unincorporated community
- Location in California Banner (the United States)
- Coordinates: 33°04′08″N 116°32′46″W
- Country: United States
- State: California
- County: San Diego
- Elevation: 2,743 ft (836 m)

Banner (formerly Banner City) is an unincorporated community in San Diego County, California, United States. It lies at an elevation of 2743 feet (836 m). It is located on California State Route 78.

== Climate ==
Banner has a relatively dry climate due to its close proximity to the Anza-Borrego desert. The city can receive snowfall because of its higher elevation, although it is usually only a couple inches per year.

== History ==
Banner City was founded in August 1870 by Louis B. Redman, east of Julian, serving several gold mines in the surrounding hills in the Julian Banner Mining District. It had a hotel, two stores, three saloons, and stamping mills. The town received its name after a miner marked his claim with an American flag (in reference to the Star-Spangled Banner.) Chariot Canyon, a small canyon south-adjacent to the town, was where most of the town's mining took place. Some claim that the yield of Banner's mines even surpassed those of rivaling town Julian's. The greatest period of mining activity was from 1870 to 1880.

In the fall of 1870, a miner named George V. King came to Banner after finding that all the mines in Julian had been claimed. One day in Chariot Canyon, King broke off a piece of quartz while climbing and found that it had flecks of gold inside. He and a few friends established adjoining land claims and founded the Golden Chariot mine. The mine grossed US$6,000 from its first five tons of gold, creating notoriety for Banner throughout the southwestern United States. The mine exported over US$80,000 of gold within its first year of operation. Mark McDonald and W. A. Whitney purchased the Golden Chariot mine for US$100,000. The new owners installed a 10-stamp mill and replaced the modest mining equipment used by the previous owners. Under the new supervision, the Golden Chariot mine produced nearly US$2,000,000 worth of gold within a decade.

Several other mines such as Ready Relief, Big Blue, Warlock, Antelope, and Chaparral operated in Banner and collectively excavated millions of dollars' worth of gold. Bringing in heavy machinery for the mines proved to be a tough task as they had to be lowered via stone sleds down the Banner Gilbert Slide. The Wilcox toll road opened in 1872 which greatly reduced the difficulty of getting mining equipment into the area.

The Banner post office operated from July 29, 1873, to November 24, 1876, Dec 5, 1876 to Oct 31, 1877 and from 25 Apr 1883 to Dec 28, 1906 when it was moved to Julian. Unlike its rival, Julian, the town suffered from multiple floods in 1874, 1916, and 1926. In the 1930s, it suffered a fire that left little trace of the old town.

== 1989 Memorial Day Killings ==
On May 29, 1989, five men exchanged fire in a deadly dispute over a gold claim in the historic Chariot Canyon gold field. Originally, two individuals (Benjamin Haimes of Encino and Gustav Oran Hudson of El Cajon) had become involved in a land dispute over the Ready Relief and Hubbard Mines in Chariot Canyon (historically owned by the Bureau of Land Management), as both had intentions to prospect in the area.

Hudson and his family happened to arrive at the property at the same time as Haimes’ appointed caretaker, Chris Zerbe. After a verbal altercation, the resulting escalation involved multiple weapons and resulted in the death of Zerbe and his companion.

Zerbe was labeled as the main aggressor, and no charges were filed against Hudson. The San Diego District Attorney is on record as stating, "It is our conclusion upon sifting [through the] facts as adduced from the reports and supplemental review[...], that no criminal complaint can be filed as a result of this incident.”

Nicknamed the “Chariot Canyon Massacre,” this incident is understood to be the first gold prospecting-related killing in the area since the gold rush of the late 1800s.
