= Alamorio, California =

Unincorporated community in California, United States

Alamorio
- Unincorporated community
- Location in California Alamorio (the United States)
- Coordinates: 32°58′45″N 115°27′41″W
- Country: United States
- State: California
- County: Imperial County
- Elevation: −130 ft (−40 m)

Alamorio (from Spanish Álamo and Río meaning "poplar tree" and "river") is an unincorporated community in Imperial County, California. It is located 12.5 miles (20 km), north-northwest of Holtville, at an elevation of 128 feet (40 m) below sea level. The community resides along the Alamo River and California State Route 78.

A post office operated at Alamorio from 1909 to 1917.
