= Heber, California =

Census-designated place in California, USA

Heber
- census-designated place
- Location in Imperial County and the state of California

- Location in the United States
- Coordinates: 32°43′51″N 115°31′47″W
- Country: United States
- State: California
- County: Imperial

Area
  - Total: 1.436 sq mi (3.718 km^{2})
  - Land: 1.436 sq mi (3.718 km^{2})
  - Water: 0 sq mi (0 km^{2}) 0%
- Elevation: −9.8 ft (−3 m)

Population (2020)
  - Total: 6,896
  - Density: 4,804/sq mi (1,855/km^{2})
- Time zone: UTC-8 (Pacific (PST))
  - Summer (DST): UTC-7 (PDT)
- ZIP code: 92249
- Area codes: 442/760
- FIPS code: 06-33084
- GNIS feature ID: 1660738, 2408367

Heber is a census-designated place (CDP) in Imperial County, California. Heber is located 4.5 miles (7 km) north-northwest of Calexico. The population was 6,896 at the 2020 census, up from 4,275 in 2010.

== Geography ==
According to the United States Census Bureau, the CDP has a total area of 1.4 square miles (3.6 km^{2}), all land.

== History ==
Heber was founded in 1903 by the Imperial Land Company. The first post office at Heber opened in 1904, having been established first as Bradtmoore a half mile north. The name honors A.H. Heber, president of the California Development Company.

== Demographics ==
Historical population
| Census | Pop. | Note | %± |
|---|---|---|---|
| 1980 | 2,221 | | — |
| 1990 | 2,566 | | 15.5% |
| 2000 | 2,988 | | 16.4% |
| 2010 | 4,275 | | 43.1% |
| 2020 | 6,896 | | 61.3% |
U.S. Decennial Census; 1860–1870 1880-1890; 1900 1910 1920; 1930 1940 1950; 1960 1970 1980; 1990 2000 2010; 2020

Heber first appeared as a census-designated place in the 1980 United States census as part of the El Centro census county division.

=== Racial and ethnic composition ===
Heber CDP, California – Racial and ethnic composition Note: the US Census treats Hispanic/Latino as an ethnic category. This table excludes Latinos from the racial categories and assigns them to a separate category. Hispanics/Latinos may be of any race.
| Race / Ethnicity (NH = Non-Hispanic) | Pop 2000 | Pop 2010 | Pop 2020 | % 2000 | % 2010 | % 2020 |
|---|---|---|---|---|---|---|
| White alone (NH) | 55 | 62 | 123 | 1.84% | 1.45% | 1.78% |
| Black or African American alone (NH) | 6 | 1 | 12 | 0.20% | 0.02% | 0.17% |
| Native American or Alaska Native alone (NH) | 0 | 1 | 6 | 0.00% | 0.02% | 0.09% |
| Asian alone (NH) | 2 | 9 | 22 | 0.07% | 0.21% | 0.32% |
| Native Hawaiian or Pacific Islander alone (NH) | 0 | 0 | 1 | 0.00% | 0.00% | 0.01% |
| Other race alone (NH) | 0 | 1 | 6 | 0.00% | 0.02% | 0.09% |
| Mixed race or Multiracial (NH) | 11 | 4 | 13 | 0.37% | 0.09% | 0.19% |
| Hispanic or Latino (any race) | 2,914 | 4,197 | 6,713 | 97.52% | 98.18% | 97.35% |
| Total | 2,988 | 4,275 | 6,896 | 100.00% | 100.00% | 100.00% |

=== 2020 census ===
As of the 2020 census, Heber had a population of 6,896. The population density was 4,802.2 inhabitants per square mile (1,854.1/km^{2}).

The whole population lived in households. There were 1,770 households, out of which 54.4% included children under the age of 18, 60.6% were married-couple households, 4.9% were cohabiting couple households, 25.9% had a female householder with no spouse or partner present, and 8.6% had a male householder with no spouse or partner present. 9.4% of households were one person, and 3.7% had someone living alone who was 65 years of age or older. The average household size was 3.9. There were 1,563 families (88.3% of all households).

The age distribution was 30.1% under the age of 18, 10.7% aged 18 to 24, 26.1% aged 25 to 44, 22.2% aged 45 to 64, and 10.8% who were 65 years of age or older. The median age was 33.1 years. For every 100 females, there were 92.5 males, and for every 100 females age 18 and over there were 86.9 males age 18 and over.

There were 1,816 housing units at an average density of 1,264.6 units per square mile (488.3 units/km^{2}), of which 1,770 (97.5%) were occupied. Of occupied units, 69.3% were owner-occupied and 30.7% were occupied by renters. The homeowner vacancy rate was 0.6%, and the rental vacancy rate was 1.8%.

99.5% of residents lived in urban areas, while 0.5% lived in rural areas.

=== 2010 census ===
The 2010 United States census reported that Heber had a population of 4,275. The population density was 2,878.3 inhabitants per square mile (1,111.3/km^{2}). The racial makeup of Heber was 2,174 (50.9%) White, 5 (0.1%) African American, 33 (0.8%) Native American, 15 (0.4%) Asian, 0 (0.0%) Pacific Islander, 1,758 (41.1%) from other races, and 290 (6.8%) from two or more races. Hispanic or Latino of any race were 4,197 persons (98.2%).

The Census reported that 4,275 people (100% of the population) lived in households, 0 (0%) lived in non-institutionalized group quarters, and 0 (0%) were institutionalized.

There were 1,094 households, out of which 694 (63.4%) had children under the age of 18 living in them, 657 (60.1%) were opposite-sex married couples living together, 279 (25.5%) had a female householder with no husband present, 65 (5.9%) had a male householder with no wife present. There were 48 (4.4%) unmarried opposite-sex partnerships, and 7 (0.6%) same-sex married couples or partnerships. 77 households (7.0%) were made up of individuals, and 39 (3.6%) had someone living alone who was 65 years of age or older. The average household size was 3.91. There were 1,001 families (91.5% of all households); the average family size was 4.09.

The population was spread out, with 1,454 people (34.0%) under the age of 18, 454 people (10.6%) aged 18 to 24, 1,115 people (26.1%) aged 25 to 44, 830 people (19.4%) aged 45 to 64, and 422 people (9.9%) who were 65 years of age or older. The median age was 28.7 years. For every 100 females, there were 89.9 males. For every 100 females age 18 and over, there were 82.5 males.

There were 1,192 housing units at an average density of 802.6 per square mile (309.9/km^{2}), of which 1,094 were occupied, of which 678 (62.0%) were owner-occupied, and 416 (38.0%) were occupied by renters. The homeowner vacancy rate was 2.0%; the rental vacancy rate was 6.3%. 2,736 people (64.0% of the population) lived in owner-occupied housing units and 1,539 people (36.0%) lived in rental housing units.

=== Demographic estimates ===
In 2023, the US Census Bureau estimated that 35.3% of the population were foreign-born. Of all people aged 5 or older, 11.3% spoke only English at home and 88.7% spoke Spanish. Of those aged 25 or older, 77.8% were high school graduates and 23.4% had a bachelor's degree.

=== Income and poverty ===
The median household income in 2023 was $75,664, and the per capita income was $21,349. About 19.8% of families and 18.0% of the population were below the poverty line.

== Politics ==
In the state legislature, Heber is in the 18th senatorial district, represented by Democrat Steve Padilla, and the 36th Assembly district, represented by Republican Jeff Gonzalez.

Federally, Heber is in California's 25th congressional district, represented by Democrat Raul Ruiz.

== Climate ==
Heber, California, has a semiarid or a hot desert climate.

== Government ==
The Heber Public Utility District operates water, wastewater, and parks and recreation services for Heber.
