= Calipatria, California =

City in California, United States

City of Calipatria
- City
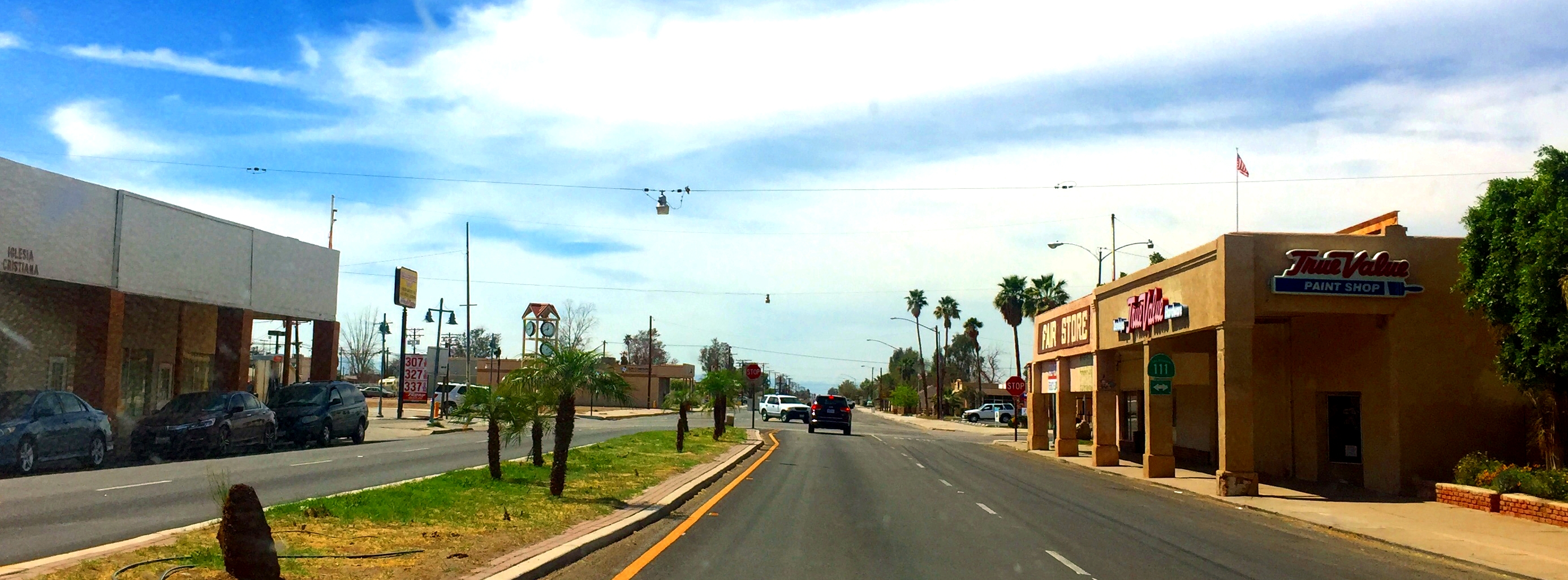
- Downtown Calipatria at E. Main St. (CA SR 115) and N. Sorensen Ave. (CA SR 111)

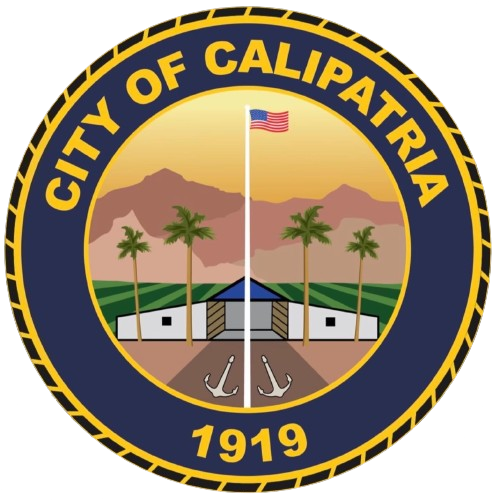
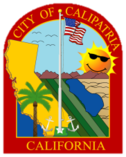
- Seal Logo
- Interactive map of City of Calipatria
- Location in the United States
- Coordinates: 33°07′32″N 115°30′51″W
- Country: United States
- State: California
- County: Imperial
- Incorporated: February 28, 1919

Area
  - Total: 3.70 sq mi (9.58 km^{2})
  - Land: 3.70 sq mi (9.58 km^{2})
  - Water: 0 sq mi (0.00 km^{2}) 0%
- Elevation: −180 ft (−55 m)

Population (2020)
  - Total: 6,515
  - Density: 1,761.5/sq mi (680.12/km^{2})
- Time zone: UTC-8 (Pacific (PST))
  - Summer (DST): UTC-7 (PDT)
- ZIP code: 92233
- Area codes: 442/760
- FIPS code: 06-09878
- GNIS feature IDs: 1652681, 2409962
- Website: www.calipatria.com

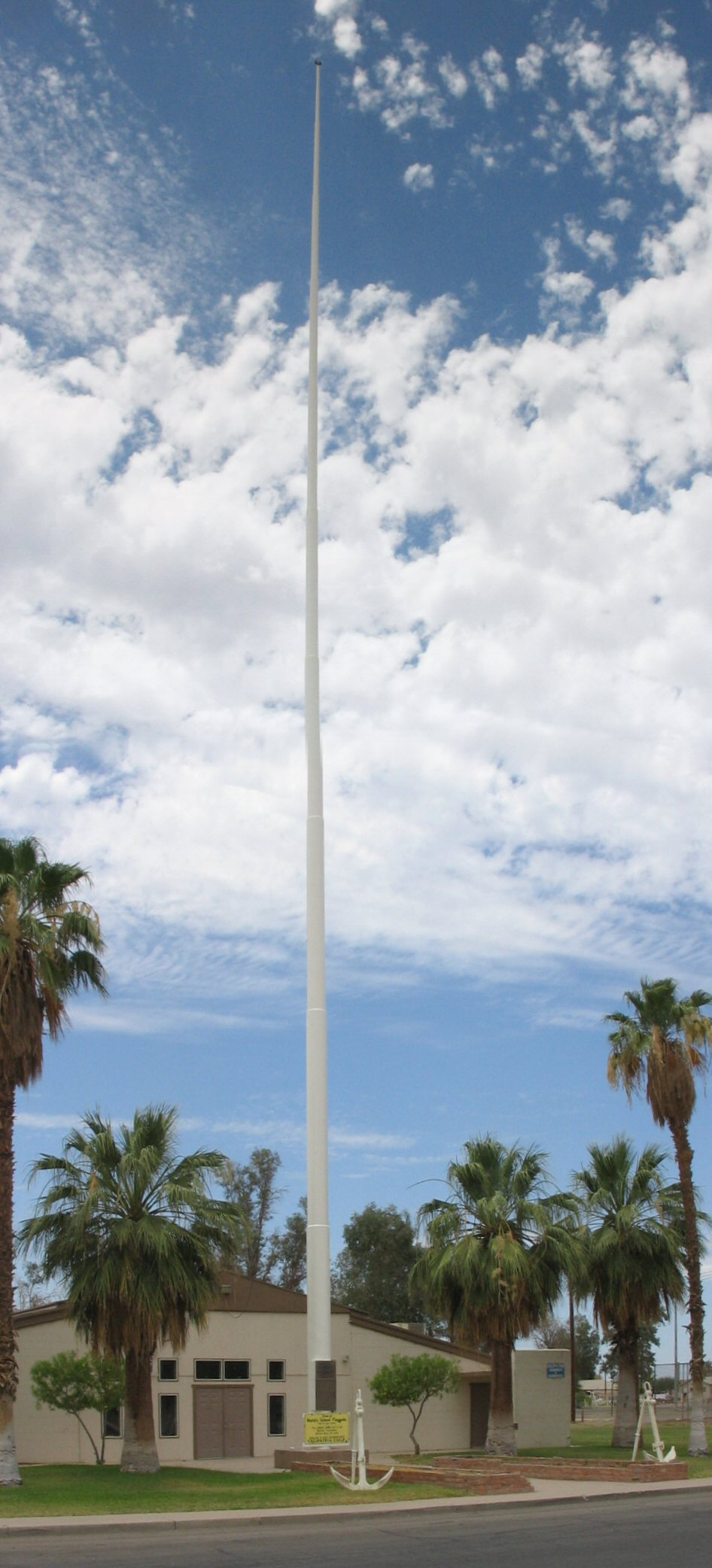
184-foot flagpole

plaque at base of 184-foot (56 m) flagpole

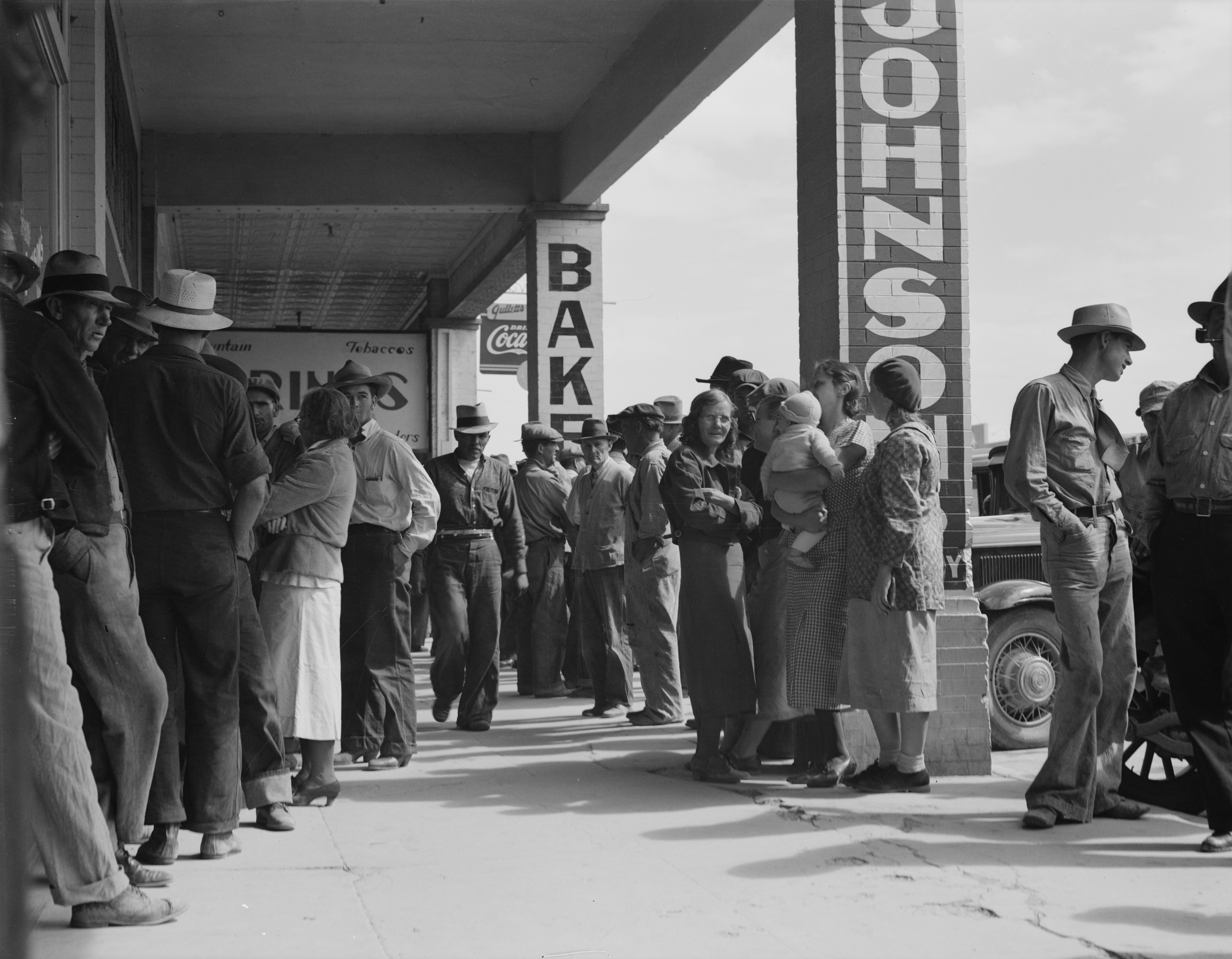
Waiting for relief checks during the Great Depression, Calipatria, California, March 1937

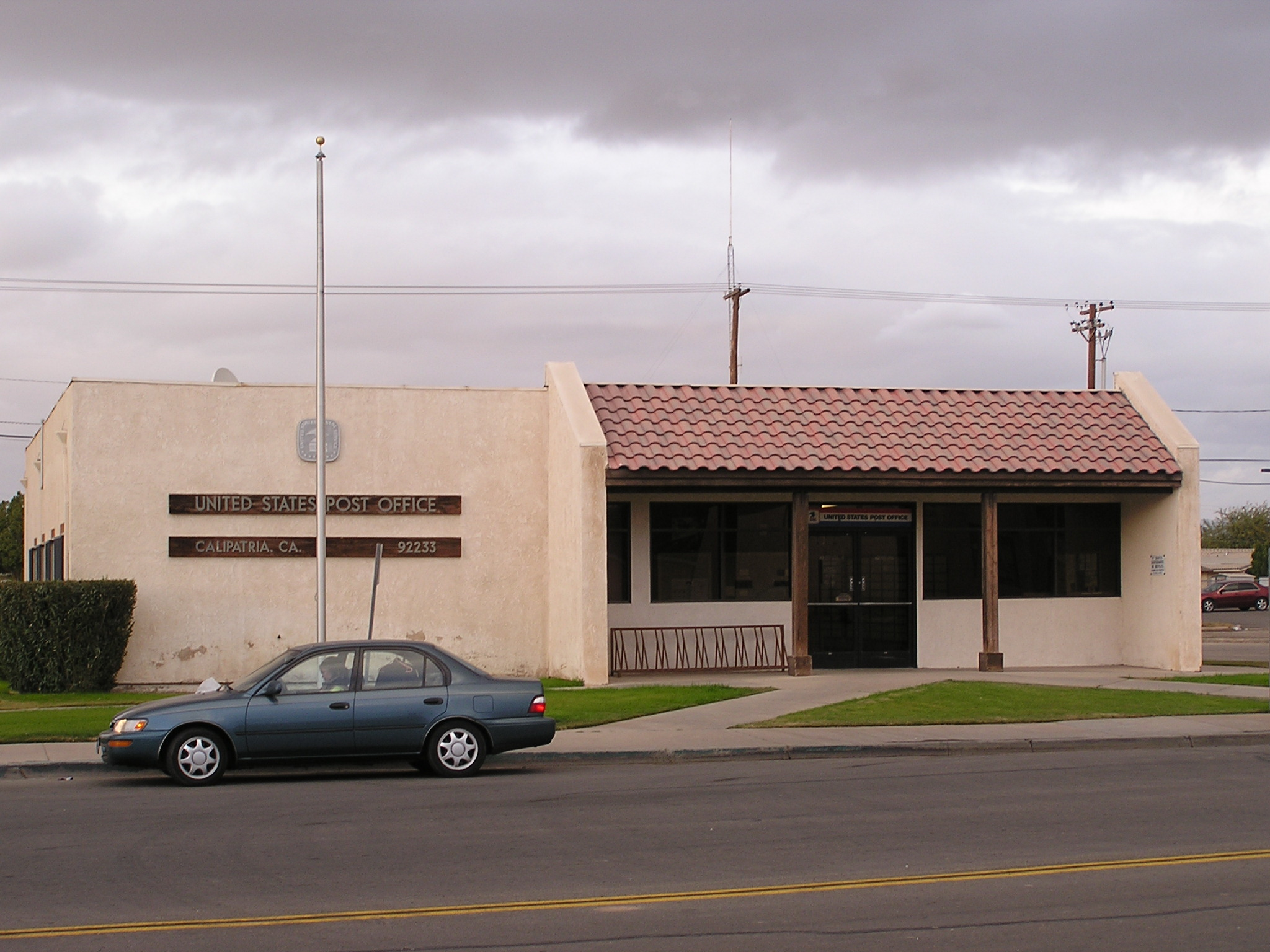
Calipatria Post Office.

Calipatria (portmanteau of California and Patria, Spanish for "homeland") is a city in Imperial County, California. Calipatria is located 23 miles (37 km) north of El Centro. It is part of the El Centro Metropolitan Area. The population was 6,515 at the 2020 census, down from 7,710 at the 2010 census, up from 7,289 at the 2000 census, including 4000 inmates at Calipatria State Prison. The community is located along State Route 111.

== Geography ==
Calipatria is located at 33°07′32″N 115°30′51″W.

At an elevation of 180 feet (55 m) below sea level, Calipatria is the lowest incorporated city in the Western Hemisphere. The city currently claims to have the "tallest flagpole (184 feet) where the flag flies at sea level" at 184 feet (56 m), so their American flag will always fly above sea level.

According to the United States Census Bureau, the city has a total area of 3.7 square miles (9.6 km^{2}), all land.

=== Climate ===
This area has a large amount of sunshine year round due to its stable descending air and high pressure. According to the Köppen Climate Classification system, Calipatria has a hot desert climate, abbreviated "Bwh" on climate maps.

Climate data for Calipatria (180 feet below sea level)
Month	Jan	Feb	Mar	Apr	May	Jun	Jul	Aug	Sep	Oct	Nov	Dec	Year
Mean daily maximum °F (°C)	71.0 (21.7)	74.0 (23.3)	80.0 (26.7)	86.0 (30.0)	95.0 (35.0)	103.0 (39.4)	107.0 (41.7)	107.0 (41.7)	102.0 (38.9)	91.0 (32.8)	79.0 (26.1)	70.0 (21.1)	88.8 (31.5)
Daily mean °F (°C)	56.0 (13.3)	59.0 (15.0)	64.5 (18.1)	70.0 (21.1)	77.5 (25.3)	85.0 (29.4)	91.0 (32.8)	92.0 (33.3)	86.0 (30.0)	75.0 (23.9)	63.5 (17.5)	55.0 (12.8)	72.9 (22.7)
Mean daily minimum °F (°C)	41.0 (5.0)	44.0 (6.7)	49.0 (9.4)	54.0 (12.2)	60.0 (15.6)	67.0 (19.4)	75.0 (23.9)	77.0 (25.0)	70.0 (21.1)	59.0 (15.0)	48.0 (8.9)	40.0 (4.4)	57.0 (13.9)
Average precipitation inches (mm)	0.48 (12)	0.55 (14)	0.33 (8.4)	0.05 (1.3)	0.02 (0.51)	0.00 (0.00)	0.08 (2.0)	0.21 (5.3)	0.16 (4.1)	0.25 (6.4)	0.19 (4.8)	0.48 (12)	2.80 (71)
Source: Weather Channel

== History ==
The Imperial Valley Farm Lands Association founded the town as Date City in 1914. The first post office at Calipatria opened in 1914. Calipatria incorporated in 1919.

== Demographics ==
Historical population
Census	Pop.	Note	%±
1920	785		—
1930	1,554		98.0%
1940	1,799		15.8%
1950	1,428		−20.6%
1960	2,548		78.4%
1970	1,824		−28.4%
1980	2,636		44.5%
1990	2,690		2.0%
2000	7,289		171.0%
2010	7,705		5.7%
2020	6,515		−15.4%
U.S. Decennial Census

=== 2020 census ===
As of the 2020 census, Calipatria had a population of 6,515 and a population density of 1,761.3 inhabitants per square mile (680.0/km^{2}). The median age was 32.0 years. The age distribution was 18.7% under the age of 18, 10.2% aged 18 to 24, 46.8% aged 25 to 44, 18.0% aged 45 to 64, and 6.2% who were 65 years of age or older. For every 100 females, there were 250.1 males, and for every 100 females age 18 and over, there were 319.8 males age 18 and over.

The census reported that 55.4% of the population lived in households and 44.6% were institutionalized. 0.0% of residents lived in urban areas, while 100.0% lived in rural areas.

There were 1,034 households in Calipatria, of which 50.9% had children under the age of 18 living in them. Of all households, 46.0% were married-couple households, 8.2% were cohabiting-couple households, 15.0% were households with a male householder and no spouse or partner present, and 30.8% were households with a female householder and no spouse or partner present. About 13.7% of households were made up of one person, and 5.4% had someone living alone who was 65 years of age or older. The average household size was 3.49, and there were 839 families (81.1% of all households).

There were 1,116 housing units at an average density of 301.7 units per square mile (116.5 units/km^{2}), of which 92.7% were occupied. Of occupied units, 51.5% were owner-occupied and 48.5% were occupied by renters. The remaining 7.3% of housing units were vacant. The homeowner vacancy rate was 2.0%, and the rental vacancy rate was 5.4%.

Racial composition as of the 2020 census
Race	Number	Percent
White	1,202	18.4%
Black or African American	986	15.1%
American Indian and Alaska Native	96	1.5%
Asian	71	1.1%
Native Hawaiian and Other Pacific Islander	18	0.3%
Some other race	3,096	47.5%
Two or more races	1,046	16.1%
Hispanic or Latino (of any race)	4,960	76.1%

=== Income and poverty ===
In 2023, the US Census Bureau estimated that the median household income was $52,672, and the per capita income was $10,640. About 17.3% of families and 25.2% of the population were below the poverty line.

=== 2010 census ===
At the 2010 census Calipatria had a population of 7,800. The population density was 2,073.6 inhabitants per square mile (800.6/km^{2}). The racial makeup of Calipatria was 3,212 (41.7%) White, 1,612 (22.4%) African American, 80 (1.0%) Native American, Hispanic or Latino of any race were 4,940 persons (64.1%), 95 (1.2%) Asian, 25 (0.3%) Pacific Islander, 2,455 (31.9%) from other races, and 227 (2.9%) from two or more races. The census reported that 3,541 people (46.0% of the population) lived in households, no one lived in non-institutionalized group quarters and 4,164 (54.0%) were institutionalized.

There were 1,008 households, 541 (53.7%) had children under the age of 18 living in them, 515 (51.0%) were opposite-sex married couples living together, 213 (21.1%) had a female householder with no husband present, 92 (9.1%) had a male householder with no wife present. There were 53 (5.3%) unmarried opposite-sex partnerships, and 15 (1.5%) same-sex married couples or partnerships. 162 households (16.1%) were one person and 70 (6.9%) had someone living alone who was 65 or older. The average household size was 3.51. There were 819 families (81.3% of households); the average family size was 3.92.

The age distribution was 1,246 people (16.2%) under the age of 18, 932 people (12.1%) aged 18 to 24, 3,738 people (48.5%) aged 25 to 44, 1,431 people (18.6%) aged 45 to 64, and 358 people (4.6%) who were 65 or older. The median age was 32.9 years. For every 100 females, there were 330.9 males. For every 100 females age 18 and over, there were 427.3 males.

There were 1,121 housing units at an average density of 301.7 per square mile (116.5/km^{2}), of which 1,008 were occupied, 536 (53.2%) by the owners and 472 (46.8%) by renters. The homeowner vacancy rate was 5.9%; the rental vacancy rate was 10.6%. 1,867 people (24.2% of the population) lived in owner-occupied housing units and 1,674 people (21.7%) lived in rental housing units.

== Politics ==
In the state legislature, Calipatria is in the 18th senatorial district, represented by Democrat Steve Padilla, and the 36th Assembly district, represented by Republican Jeff Gonzalez.

Federally, Calipatria is in California's 25th congressional district, represented by Democrat Raul Ruiz.

== Infrastructure ==
=== Transportation ===
Freight rail service is provided by Union Pacific Railroad's Calexico Subdivision.

=== Utilities ===
Calipatria is served by Golden State Water Company, Imperial Irrigation District, Southern California Gas, and Pacific Bell.

== Landmarks ==
Salvation Mountain is a notable tourist attraction in the north of Calipatria, near Slab City. Salvation Mountain is a small hill which is entirely covered in thousands of gallons of acrylic paint, straw, concrete, adobe. It was created by Leonard Knight to convey the message that "God Loves Everyone". Salvation Mountain was featured in the book Into the Wild and also in the 2007 movie of the same name. The video for Fourth of July, by Shooter Jennings, is partially set at Salvation Mountain.

== Sister cities ==
- Brawley, California

== See also ==
- KAJB TV
- Cliff Hatfield Memorial Airport
- San Diego–Imperial, California
- El Centro Metropolitan Area
