= Kane Spring, California =

Unincorporated community in California, United States

Kane Spring
- Unincorporated community
- Location in California Kane Spring (the United States)
- Coordinates: 33°06′34″N 115°50′12″W
- Country: United States
- State: California
- County: Imperial County
- Elevation: −141 ft (−43 m)

Kane Spring (formerly, Cane Spring, Kane Springs, and San Anselmo) is a spring in Imperial County, California. It is located 1.9 km (1.2 mi) south-southwest of San Felipe Wash and 8 km (5 mi) west of the southwestern extension of the Salton Sea, at an elevation of 141 feet (43 m) below sea level.

In 1774, the Anza Expedition stopped at Kane Spring (then called San Anselmo).
