= U.S. Route 80 in California =

Former section of U.S. Highway in California, United States

U.S. Route 80
- The Broadway of America
- 1942 alignment of US 80 highlighted in red

Route information
- Maintained by CDOH
- Length: 176.53 mi (284.10 km) Mileage reflects US 80 as it was in 1942.
- Existed: November 11, 1926–July 1, 1964
- Tourist routes: Historic U.S. Route 80

Major intersections (in 1942)
- West end: US 101 in San Diego
- US 395 in San Diego; SR 94 in San Diego; SR 79 near Descanso; SR 94 in Newton; SR 98 near Coyote Wells; US 99 near El Centro; SR 111 in El Centro; SR 98 in Midway Wells
- East end: US 80 at the Arizona state line

Location
- Country: United States
- State: California
- Counties: San Diego, Imperial

Highway system
- United States Numbered Highway System; List; Special; Divided; State highways in California; Interstate; US; State; Scenic; History; Pre‑1964; Unconstructed; Deleted; Freeways
← I-80	→ SR 81

U.S. Route 80 (US 80) was a U.S. highway in California that continued east across the country to Georgia. The western terminus of US 80 was in San Diego, California, and it continued east through the city on several different alignments through the years. The highway went through the Cuyamaca Mountains, encountering many switchbacks, before descending to El Centro. After passing through the sand dunes, the highway crossed the Colorado River into Yuma, Arizona.

The highway replaced a 1912 plank road across much of Imperial County. The winding two-lane road through the Cuyamaca Mountains was one of the factors that led to a four-hour journey from San Diego to El Centro. During the 1930s, the road was realigned through the mountains, but several curves remained. In the 1950s, work began on constructing what would become Interstate 8 (I-8) to replace the old highway in San Diego to bypass the cities of San Diego, La Mesa, and El Cajon. This started with the construction of the Alvarado Canyon road as well as Mission Valley Road through the San Diego area, as well as construction of a replacement for the old highway across the Viejas Grade. The construction continued across the rest of the route through the next two decades. US 80 was gradually decommissioned after 1964 as I-8, through San Diego and Imperial counties, was completed. In 2006, the highway was designated by the California State Legislature as Historic U.S. Route 80.

== Route description ==
There were multiple alignments through the downtown San Diego area. The route as of 1928 began at Broadway (US 101) and ran along 4th Avenue north to University Avenue in the Hillcrest district, then went east on University Avenue. By 1933, the routing had shifted to use Park Boulevard south of University Avenue into downtown, to end at Market Street; the city council voted that July to use University Avenue west of Park Boulevard to connect to US 101, to obtain federal funding for improving that road. The next year, the Point Loma highway was referred to as the western terminus of US 80 by E.E. Wallace, a district highway engineer. Nevertheless, the state-produced highway maps from the next few years did not reflect the change, or this choice of the western terminus.

In the early days of World War II, some maps showed the western terminus of US 80 at Cabrillo National Monument on Point Loma, running north on Catalina Boulevard, north then east on Cañon Street, northeast on Rosecrans Street, southeast on Lytton Street, east on Barnett Avenue, south on Pacific Highway (US 101) and finally east on Market Street, before continuing north along Park Boulevard to El Cajon Boulevard. US 395 ran concurrently along the route from downtown San Diego to the intersection with Fairmount Avenue. By 1942, the US 395 concurrency had been removed. With the completion of the Cabrillo Freeway, between 1946 and 1948, US 80 shifted from Park Boulevard to 11th Avenue north onto the new freeway before continuing east onto El Cajon Boulevard towards La Mesa. The final San Diego alignment, with signs to be placed in 1954, moved the western terminus to the intersection with US 101 where it traveled east on what was known as Camino del Rio and Alvarado Canyon Road, and then continuing on the Mission Valley road towards La Mesa. According to Caltrans district engineer Jacob Dekema, during the 1950s, the parts of Camino del Rio and Rosecrans Street from Lytton Street and Rosecrans Street to Pacific Highway were considered a part of US 80.

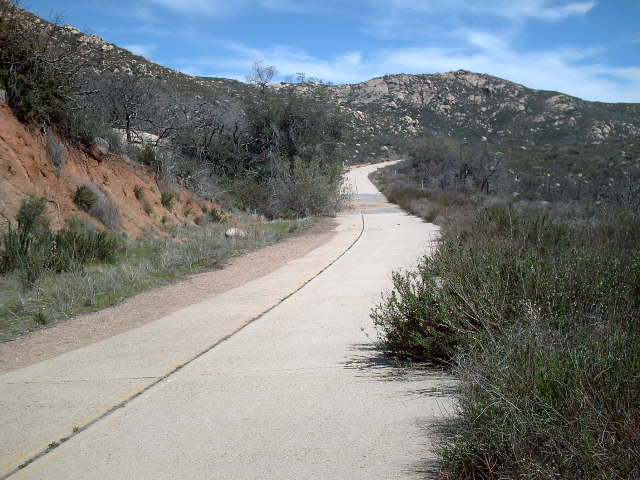
A section of old US 80 (Wildwood Glen Lane) now closed to vehicular traffic west of Descanso Junction

East of San Diego, US 80 followed the path of El Cajon Boulevard through La Mesa and then onto Main Street near downtown El Cajon before heading towards the Mountain Springs grade. The route was realigned from Arnold Way onto Alpine Boulevard as it passed through Alpine and the Viejas Indian Reservation, before entering the Laguna Mountains and the Cleveland National Forest on the alignment used by I-8. At Laguna Junction, a cafe for travelers existed from 1916 until it was removed to provide land for the interchange with I-8. A section of old US 80 — with the first few miles signed as SR 79 — continues to serve as access to the communities of Descanso, Guatay and Pine Valley; SR 79 intersected US 80 east of Descanso. At the time, the Ellis Wayside Rest/Ellis Spring provided a rest area and water for travelers; later, the state recognized it as a historic site. Exiting the national forest, US 80 continued in a southeasterly direction towards Live Oak Springs and Boulevard, intersecting with the eastern terminus of SR 94. US 80 then came close to the Mexican border as it curved around the Jacumba Mountains and into the hot spring town of Jacumba. East of there, US 80 passed by the Desert View Tower.

US 80 then descended rapidly into Imperial County along the In-Ko-Pah Gorge just west of Coyote Wells and Ocotillo before entering the city limits of El Centro. East of El Centro, US 80 again continued into Holtville. US 80 cut a southeasterly trajectory, running parallel and very close to the Mexican border, and traversing the Algodones Dunes and the Colorado Desert. It finally reached Winterhaven before crossing the Colorado River into Yuma, Arizona. Almost the entire length of the former US 80 within Imperial County has since been designated County Route S80.

== History ==

=== Construction ===
Route 12 was added to the state highway system in 1909 from San Diego to El Centro, and Route 27 was added from El Centro to Yuma in 1915. Before a highway was constructed through the Imperial San Dunes, travelers had to pass to the north in order to reach Yuma. The first route through Imperial Valley was originally a plank road made of pieces of wood that were tied together. The road was completed by October 1912, and portions were still visible into the 2010s. The Ocean-to-Ocean Bridge across the Colorado River was open in 1915, and a new plank road was opened that year which became state-maintained in 1917, and used a foundation of wooden rails, with the planks bound together by steel, as opposed to simple planks that were fastened to rails. However, traffic congestion and dusty conditions made travel along the plank road difficult. The delay in constructing a road to San Diego caused increased development in Los Angeles and resulted in that city becoming the trade and population center of Southern California.

A stagecoach road existed into the 19th century that passed through the mountains east of San Diego. Construction was discussed as early as 1911, with The San Diego Union and Daily Bee saying that it "will be one of the best in the system." Well before the freeway was constructed, the automobile road through the mountains east of San Diego was narrow and wound through the mountains; it was officially dedicated in 1912. This trip was known to take up to four hours, and frequently resulted in the radiator boiling over, flat tires, or broken fan belts; recent inclement weather would result in cars becoming mired in the mud. But meanwhile, Colonel Ed Fletcher declared the road a "success", and indicated his belief that a concrete road from San Diego to Yuma would soon follow, responding to criticism that a road from Los Angeles to Brawley should have been built.

US 80 was designated on November 11, 1926, along with the rest of the U.S. Routes. The asphalt road was constructed through the valley as the main east–west route, and was open by 1927. Another road was constructed in the early 1930s, to remove curves and widen the lanes. The result was a two-lane road that still had many switchbacks, with one popularly known as "Dead Man's Curve". Planning for this new alignment was underway in 1932, and much of the work was to be located at the Viejas Grade, and at the segment just west of Alpine. Paving continued on US 80 into 1934, just west of the sand dunes.

Meanwhile, Imperial County businessmen hoped to promote the use of this road over the route from Phoenix to Los Angeles, to increase tourism. Eventually, US 80 did become the most used road into Southern California from the east, but by 1947, the Highway 80 Associated was formed to increase the traffic on the road, since the war and advertising by other cities had caused it to fall again. Four years later, US 80 was reported to be the most used transcontinental highway, and there was a 40 percent increase in the out-of-state cars that traveled through the state inspection station at Yuma during the first three months of that year. But in 1954, there were reports that traffic had decreased, because the road to Phoenix, Arizona from Lordsburg, New Mexico had improved.

=== Early freeway development ===
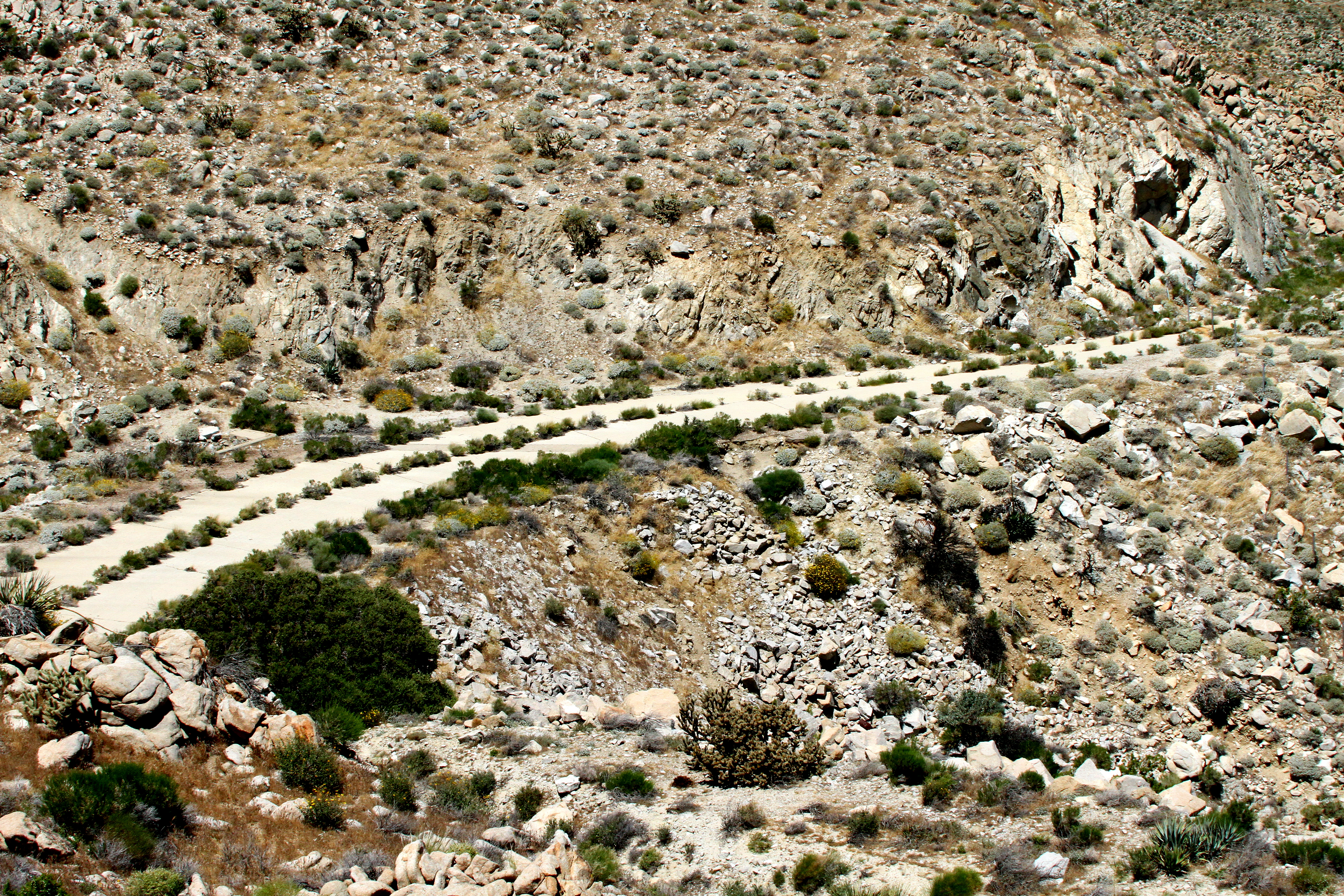
The abandoned alignment of US 80 across the In-Ko-Pah Gorge

Starting in 1932, county and state officials proposed rerouting US 80 away from what is now La Mesa Boulevard. Although the city raised concerns about the proposal, due to the shift in transportation design towards "free-access highways" where vehicles could travel up to 60 miles per hour (97 km/h), and the success of the Arroyo Seco Parkway in Los Angeles, the La Mesa Scout newspaper withdrew their objections to the construction. In the meantime, parts of El Cajon Boulevard through downtown El Cajon were widened in 1935. Federal funds were allocated for rerouting US 80 in 1940; by then, La Mesa Boulevard had been designated as a U.S. 80 Business Route, and El Cajon Boulevard then carried the US 80 designation to San Diego. But in 1947, the San Diego Highway Development Association criticized the proliferation of traffic signals and businesses on El Cajon Boulevard, during the discussion of how to resolve traffic issues on US 101 through Oceanside.

World War II stalled most freeway projects in the San Diego area. Plans were developed by 1946 for a freeway through Alvarado Canyon that would connect with the Cabrillo Freeway. Funding was obtained by 1949 for the 5.4 miles (8.7 km) portion between 70th Street and Lake Murray Boulevard, and Fairmout Avenue. The first portion of the Alvarado Canyon Highway, the first freeway thorough La Mesa, was opened in early 1950. Reports indicated that this decreased the time to travel from La Mesa to San Diego by a factor of two, with 7,000 trips on the route each day. That same year, the San Diego city manager expressed concerns at the Highway Commission meeting about shifting US 80 away from El Cajon Boulevard to the Alvarado Canyon and Mission Valley Road route, due to the potential loss of commerce for businesses located near the current route.

In 1948, the Highway 80 Chamber of Commerce president complained that funds were being prioritized for US 395 construction, instead of on US 80. In September, the county supervisors approved the Mission Valley road as a limited access highway, but held off on processing the results from surveying. The next month, $1 million was allocated to the realignment of the Viejas grade, namely, increasing the radius of the curves from 300 feet (91 m) to 2,000 feet (610 m), as well as limiting the grade to 4 percent. By 1949, the project was under way, with prisoners contributing to the labor force, and was projected to include a tunnel as well as several crossings of the Sweetwater River. A longer 34 miles (55 km) tunnel through the Cuyamaca Mountains was also proposed that year, which would have been the longest in the world. But by 1950, work on the Viejas grade had stalled, due to the prison labor camp being shut down; efforts were then made to start work again. More funds were allocated by the State Highway Commission a few months later, and the work was to be put out for bid to complete the project.

Meanwhile, construction continued on the western part of the US 80 freeway. On August 27, 1951, the final link in the new freeway between Point Loma and La Mesa was dedicated. The next year, planning continued for the possibility of a freeway bypass of El Cajon that would connect to the existing US 80 freeway. However, many El Cajon Boulevard motel owners raised objections over the reassigning of the US 80 designation to the new freeway, as it would potentially harm business. In response, the Highway Development Association proposed designating El Cajon Boulevard as a business route. But in order to obtain funding for the construction, the new route would have to be added to the state highway system by the California State Legislature, or be designated as US 80. Later, a Freeway 80 Association was formed to encourage public support for the construction of the bypass of El Cajon, and the conversion of the Alvarado Canyon and Mission Valley roads into a freeway. Following the city of San Diego council and county approval, the California State Assembly transportation committee heard complaints from citizens claiming that they had not been adequately notified about the plans for US 80 or SR 94, or given enough time to provide input.

In Imperial County, discussion regarding rerouting US 80 south of the city of Holtville began in August 1953. The next year, the state director of public works announced that the route would be rebuilt to the south for 7 miles (11 km) as a freeway. In February 1954, the California Highway Commission declared that both the Alvarado Canyon and Mission Valley roads, as well as the new Holtville alignment, were to be part of US 80; an alignment was also chosen for the part of the highway that passed through El Cajon. A $934,211 contract was given out to construct the Holtville portion in April. Contrary to the recommendation of the California Senate Interim Committee on Highways to study constructing the freeway to replace US 80 on a new alignment, San Diego County officials decided to pursue upgrading the existing road to become a freeway. Another route through the Lyons Valley was considered as an alternative. The Highway Development Association proposed adding grade-separated interchanges on the routing of US 80 through San Diego, as well as reconstructing the interchange with the Cabrillo Freeway, as well as finishing the work on the Viejas Grade and through the mountains. That year, according to Caltrans, the interchange with US 395 was the busiest in the county.

=== Interstate Highway System ===
In April 1955, a Caltrans official announced that US 80 would be built as a freeway for its entire length in California, as it was to be included in the Interstate Highway System. In the meantime, while plans moved further along on US 101, San Diego Mayor John D. Butler asked the California Highway Commission to keep the US 80 project on track. However, the construction was put on hold because of lower traffic levels on US 80, compared to other local highways. State Assemblyman Sheridan N. Hegland raised the issue in the Assembly Highway subcommittee in December, stating that the construction of the freeway would help the economy and the Port of San Diego. State Senator Randolph Collier went even further and blamed the delay on San Diego County officials, in addition to linking the delay to damaging the program to develop the port. The bridge over the Colorado River was replaced in 1956, at a cost of $1.2 million, and was in use until 1978, when the I-8 bridge was built.

Finally, in May 1957, bids opened for the part of US 80 between Grossmont Boulevard in La Mesa and Chase Avenue in El Cajon, that would connect to the new SR 67 freeway. Groundbreaking took place on June 10, and the project was to cost $3.6 million. The rebuilding of the Cabrillo Freeway interchange became a priority due to the availability of federal funding, and due to the traffic problems encountered with having ramps entering from both the left and the right. In July, the Highway Development Association decided to formally raise the issue of the incomplete highway survey through Imperial County at the next California Highway Commission meeting. In 1958, federal funds were allocated to construct US 80 from Taylor Street to Fairmount Avenue as an eight-lane freeway, and from there to 70th Street as a divided highway. In August, the state announced that there were four proposed routes for US 80 through the mountains, including one with a tunnel. A contract was later awarded to construct the freeway from Taylor Street to the Cabrillo Freeway at a cost of $1.2 million. In November, Caltrans announced that the Walker Canyon route had been chosen for US 80, which would allow for the route to be constructed in stages, as well as being the least expensive alternative.

By the end of the year, plans were being made for construction of the freeway between Flume Drive east of El Cajon and Laguna Junction, and the portion of the freeway from Fairmount Avenue to Lake Murray Boulevard was contracted for $2.6 million. In January 1960, the Taylor Street to Cabrillo Freeway portions were under construction, including the interchange at the latter, and were scheduled to be complete by October, while the Cabrillo Freeway to Fairmout Avenue portion was up for bid; the next month, the contract was awarded for $4.6 million, with interchanges to be constructed at Texas Street and Ward Road to replace traffic signals. In July, the new I-8 designation for the road was announced, and plans to post signs were made. Another contract for the portion from Grossmont Summit near Chase Avenue to Ballantyne Avenue was awarded for $2.7 million in November.

But in 1960, Jacob Dekema, the district highway engineer, stated that due to lower traffic on US 80, the completion of the freeway through the mountains would be delayed until at least 1971. Construction of the section of US 80 from Magnolia Avenue to Third Street was contracted for $2.7 million in April. That year, work continued on the freeway, and in August, only one traffic signal was left on the highway west of El Cajon, at Ward Road. In August, Dekema announced that bids for the portion between Lake Murray Boulevard and Third Street would be opened the following month; once that was completed, the entire freeway west of El Cajon would be complete. Eastbound lanes between US 395 and Fairmount Avenue opened on November 23.

Historic US 80 marker used in California.

The portion from the Grossmont summit to Magnolia Avenue and SR 67 was completed in April 1961. By August, the entirety of the freeway west of El Cajon was complete, with the exception of the portions from near Lake Murray Boulevard to near La Mesa Boulevard for $3.1 million, as well as between Magnolia Avenue and the El Cajon eastern city limits for $2.7 million. In addition to this, the part of the freeway from near Grays Well to Ogilby Road in Imperial County was also being constructed for $2.3 million. The 2.3 miles (3.7 km) freeway portion east of Magnolia Avenue that connected with the undivided US 80 opened on September 6. The final section in La Mesa was completed in April 1962. Construction started on the Mountain Springs portion of US 80 in September 1962. That year, US 80 west of the Cabrillo Freeway interchange was declared to be the busiest road in the City of San Diego, at 71,000 daily vehicles.

US 80 was removed from the state highway system on July 1, 1964 during the 1964 state highway renumbering when I-80 was designated; I-8 assumed the routing from San Diego to El Centro and Yuma. However, US 80 signs were posted for several years afterward on the remaining portions of the original asphalt road that had not been bypassed by the freeway. After I-8 was constructed, the population of Jacumba went from 400 to 200, and many businesses closed or relocated. However, the population began to increase after a few years, and residents began commuting to jobs in El Centro and San Diego. In 1969, the American Association of State Highway Officials (AASHO) formally recognized the state of California's request to decommission US 80, which entirely removed the designation between San Diego and the California–Arizona state line. The route was gradually decommissioned through Arizona, New Mexico and part of Texas between 1977 and 1991. Although much of the highway has been decommissioned, US 80 remains a designated highway between Dallas, Texas and Tybee Island, Georgia, located entirely within the southeastern United States.

Following a campaign from the local Old Highway 80 Committee and endorsement from the San Diego County Board of Supervisors, the California State Legislature designated U.S. Route 80 as an official state historic route, in 2006. There were several ribbon cuttings along the route starting at Seaport Village. Going east they stopped in La Mesa, El Cajon, the Town Hall in Alpine and ended up at the Viejas Outlet Center. In 2018, the Arizona Department of Transportation Parkways, Historic and Scenic Roads Advisory Committee adopted surviving sections of former US 80 in Arizona as a state Historic Road. This supports the California sections by extending the Historic U.S. Route 80 designation through Arizona to the New Mexico state line.

== Major intersections ==
This table refers to the route as it was in 1942.

County	Location	mi	km	Destinations	Notes
San Diego	San Diego	0.00	0.00	US 101 (Market Street/12th Avenue) – Los Angeles, San Ysidro, Tijuana	Western terminus of US 80; LRN 12 continued west to Point Loma via US 101 north
San Diego	San Diego	0.29	0.47	SR 94 (Broadway) – La Mesa	
San Diego	San Diego	5.88	9.46	US 395 north (Fairmount Avenue) – Escondido	Southern terminus of US 395
San Diego	La Mesa	12.02	19.34	La Mesa Boulevard (Legislative Route 198 south)	Former US 80 west
San Diego	El Cajon	14.79	23.80	Magnolia Avenue (Legislative Route 198 north) – Ramona	
San Diego	Sweetwater River	37.70– 37.73	60.67– 60.72	Los Terrinitos Bridge	
San Diego		40.16	64.63	SR 79 north – Cuyamaca, Hemet	Southern terminus of SR 79
San Diego		65.19	104.91	SR 94 west – Campo	Eastern terminus of SR 94
Imperial	Seeley	109.13– 109.20	175.63– 175.74	Bridge over the New River	
Imperial	Seeley	109.79	176.69	SR 98 east – Calexico	Western terminus of SR 98
Imperial	El Centro	116.87	188.08	US 99 north (Imperial Avenue) – Brawley, Indio	Western end of US 99 concurrency; Eastern terminus of LRN 12
Imperial	El Centro	118.14	190.13	US 99 south (4th Street) – Calexico, Mexicali	Eastern end of US 99 concurrency; Western terminus of LRN 27
Imperial		121.16	194.99	SR 111 – Brawley, Palm Springs, Calexico, Mexicali	
Imperial	Holtville	127.80– 127.82	205.67– 205.71	Bridge over the Alamo River	
Imperial	Holtville	128.41	206.66	Holt Avenue (Legislative Route 187 north) – Brawley	
Imperial	Holtville	128.63	207.01	Walnut Avenue (Legislative Route 187 south) – Bonds Corner	
Imperial	Midway Wells	147.56	237.47	SR 98 west – Bonds Corner	Eastern terminus of SR 98
Imperial	All-American Canal	155.26– 155.30	249.87– 249.93	All-American Canal Bridge	
Imperial		176.53	284.10	US 80 east – Yuma	Continuation into Arizona; Eastern terminus of LRN 27
1.000 mi = 1.609 km; 1.000 km = 0.621 mi: Concurrency terminus; Route transition

== Gallery ==
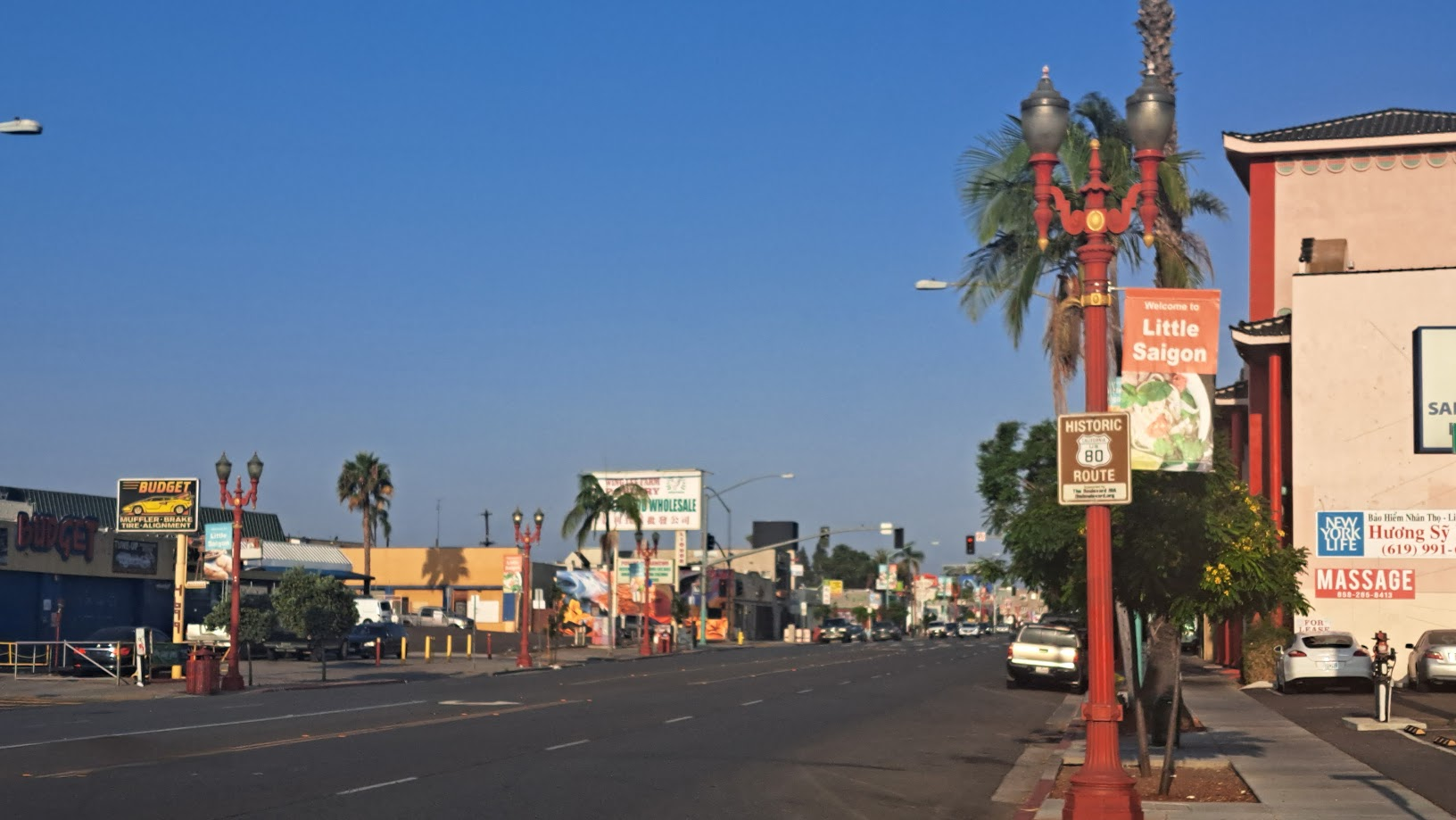
El Cajon Boulevard and 47th Street in Little Saigon

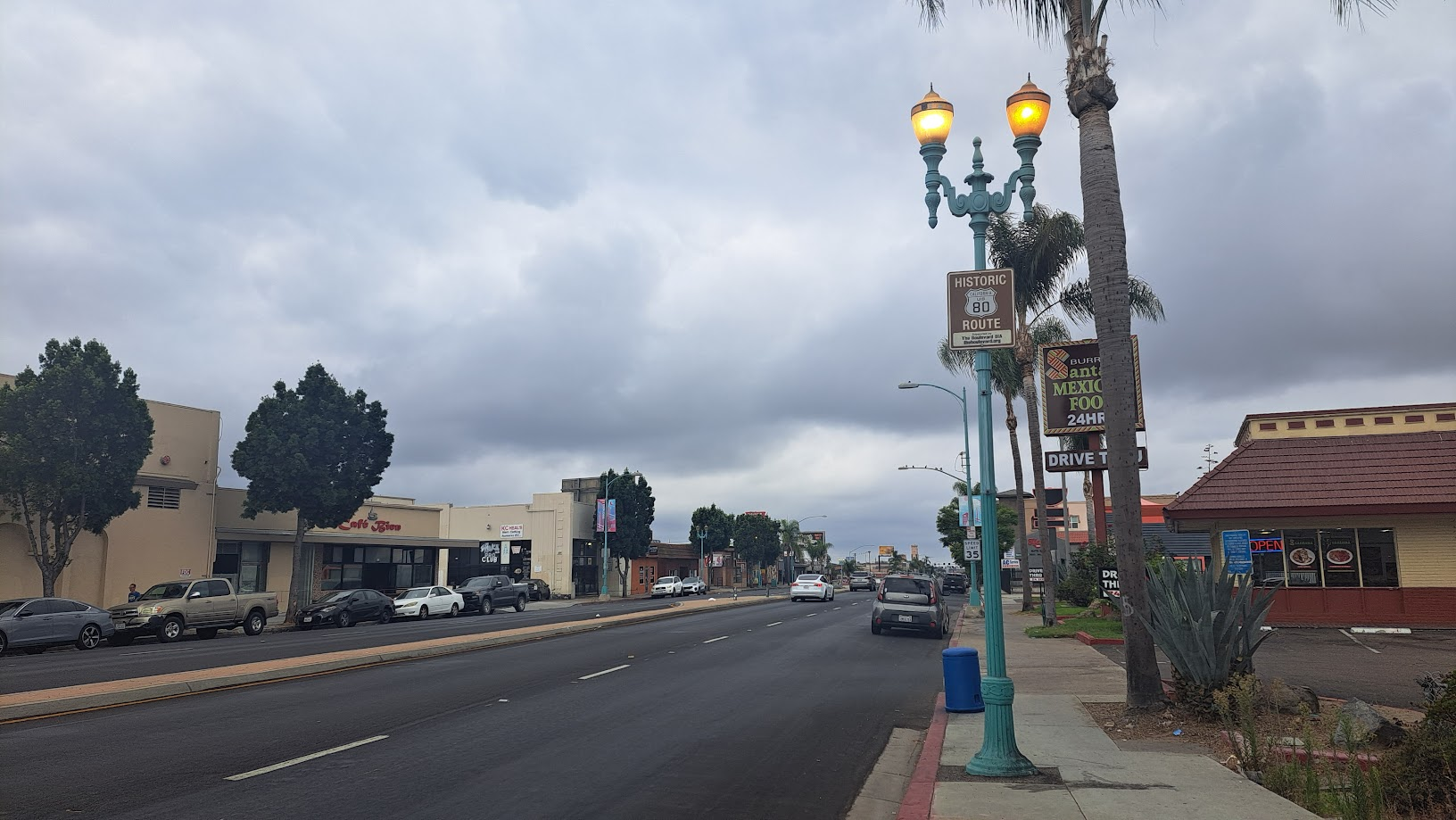
5300 Block of El Cajon Boulevard, facing East

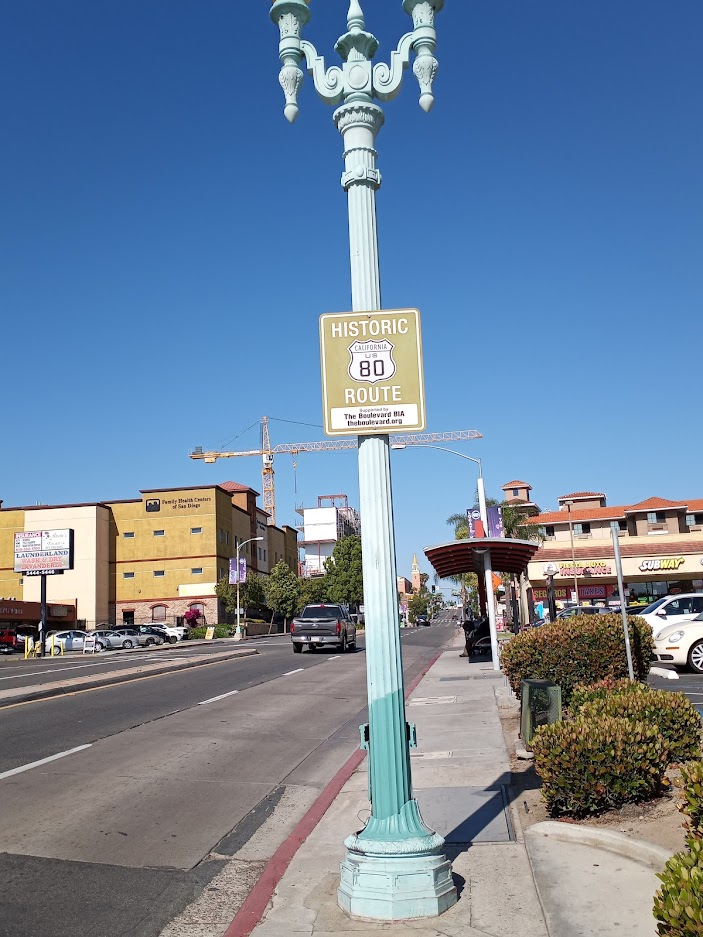
El Cajon Boulevard and 54th Street in City Heights, facing west

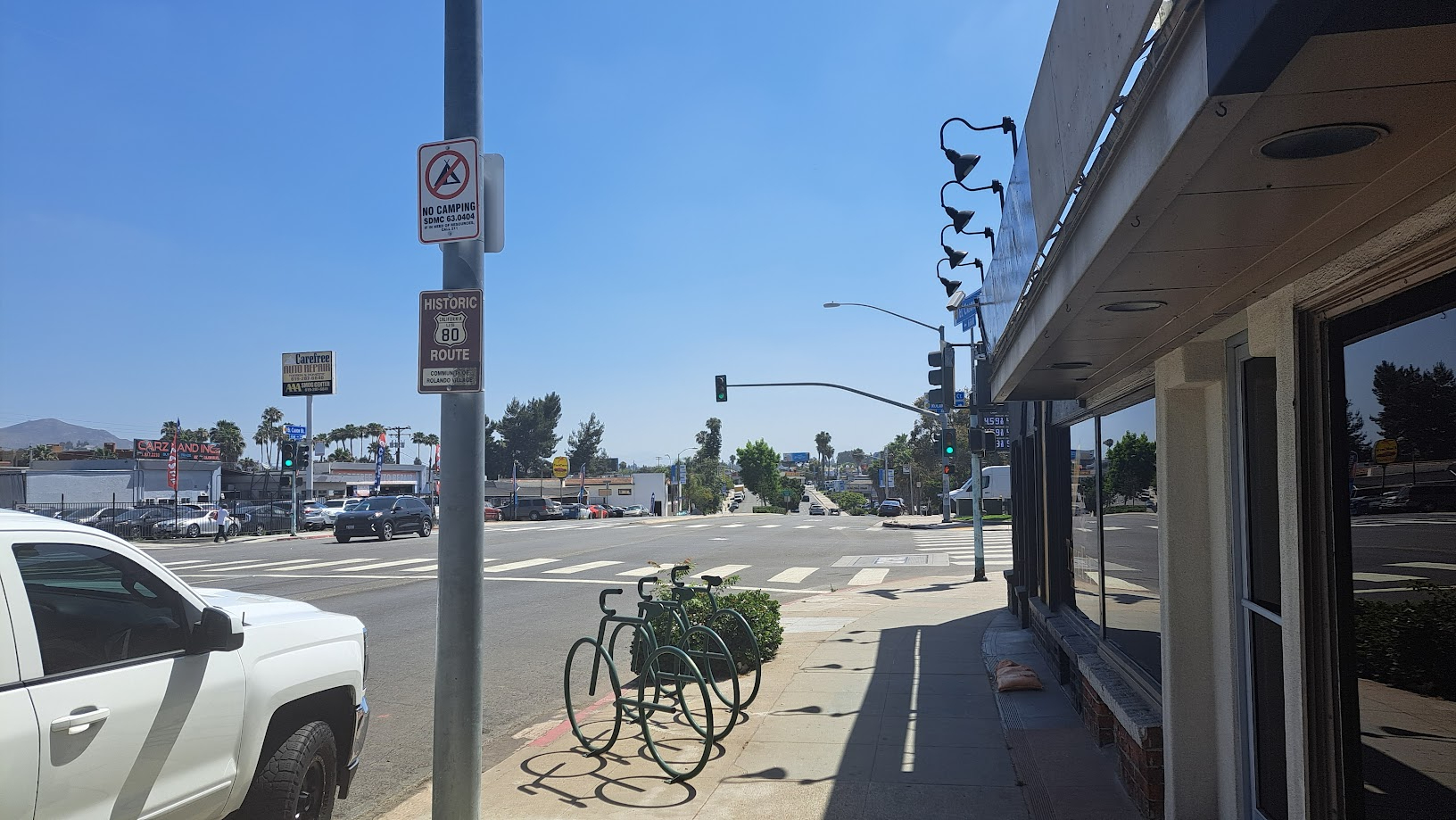
El Cajon Boulevard and Rolando Boulevard in Rolando

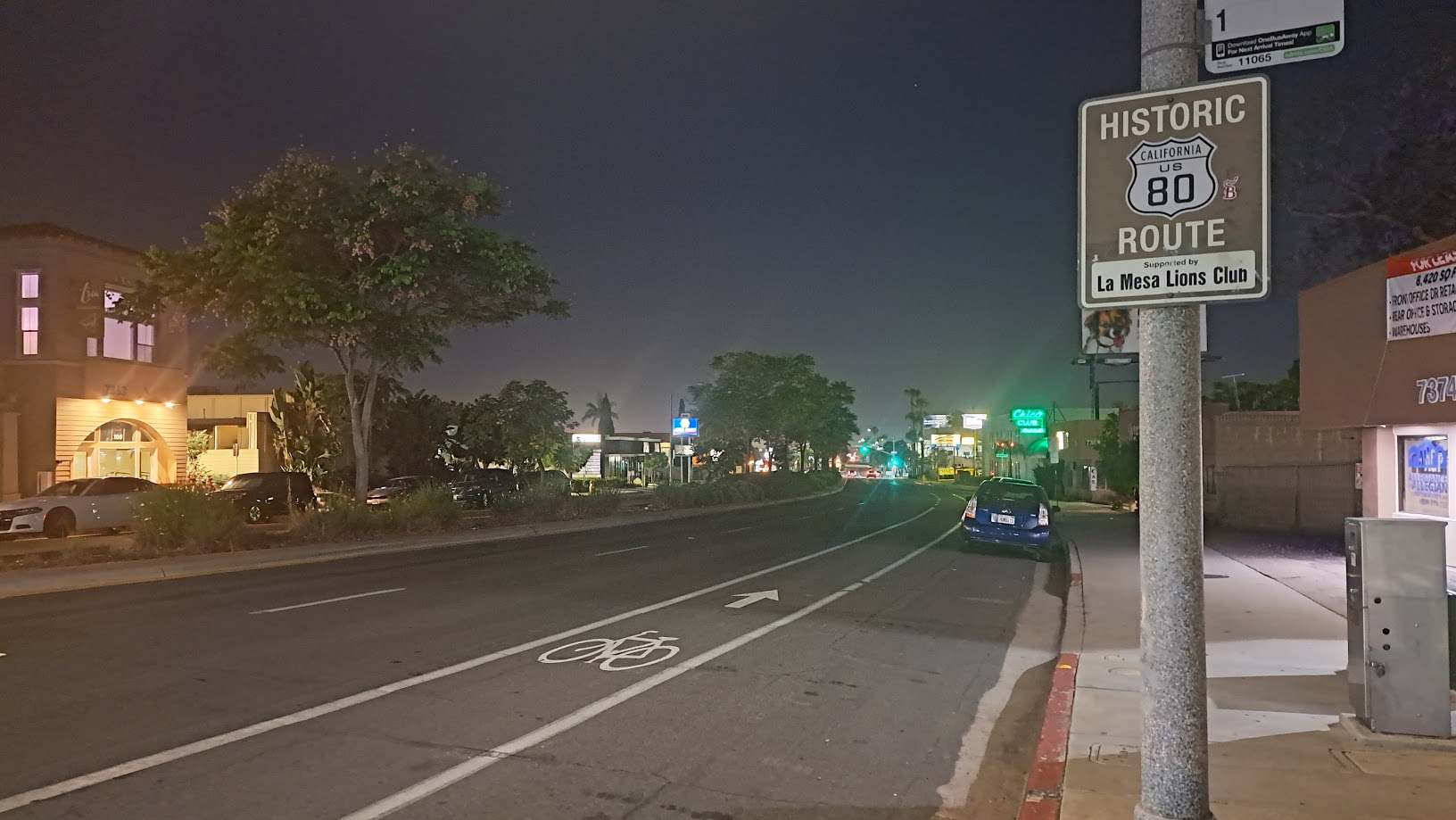
El Cajon Boulevard & Keeney Street at the border of San Diego and La Mesa

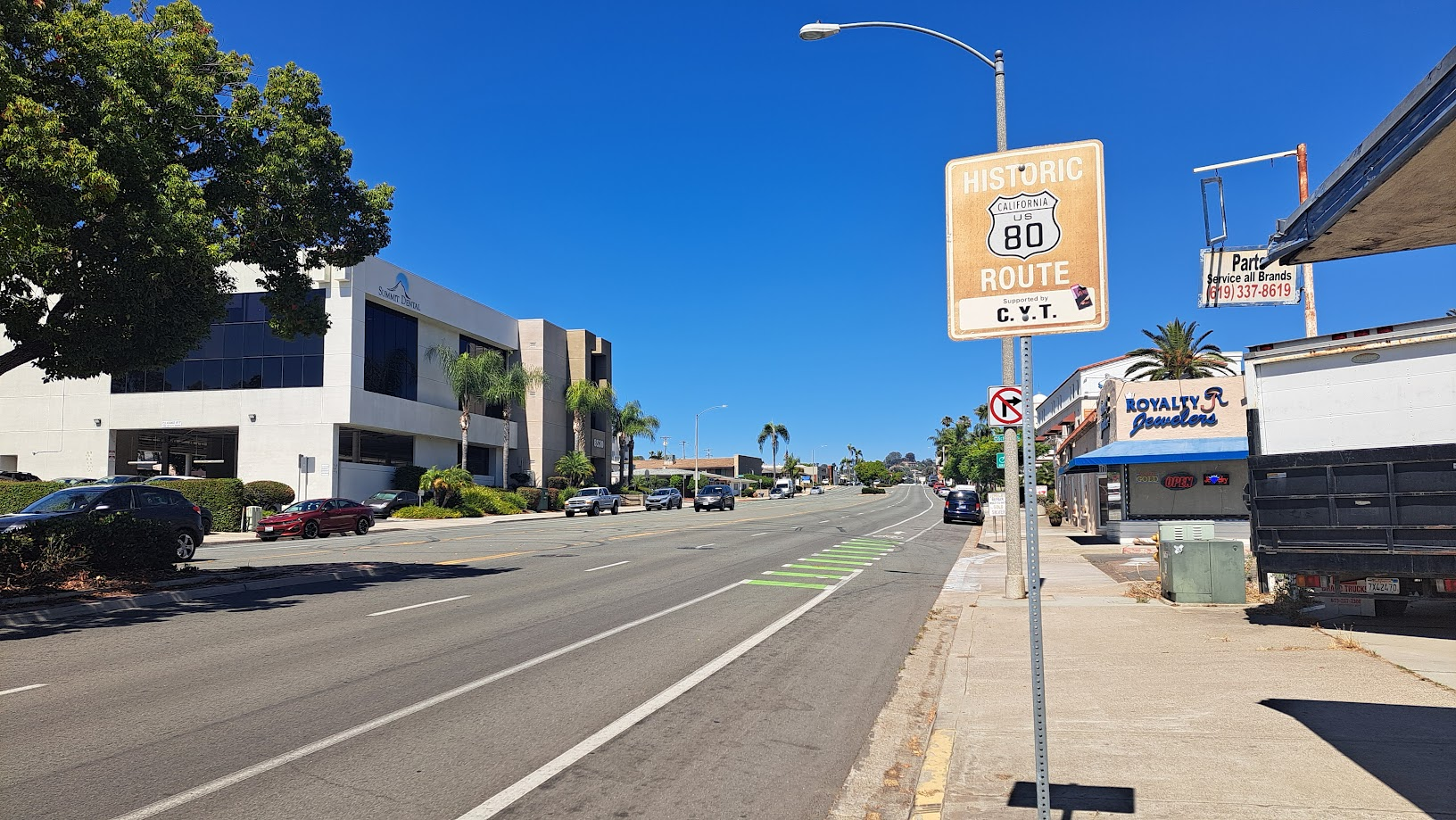
La Mesa Boulevard and Porter Hill Road in La Mesa

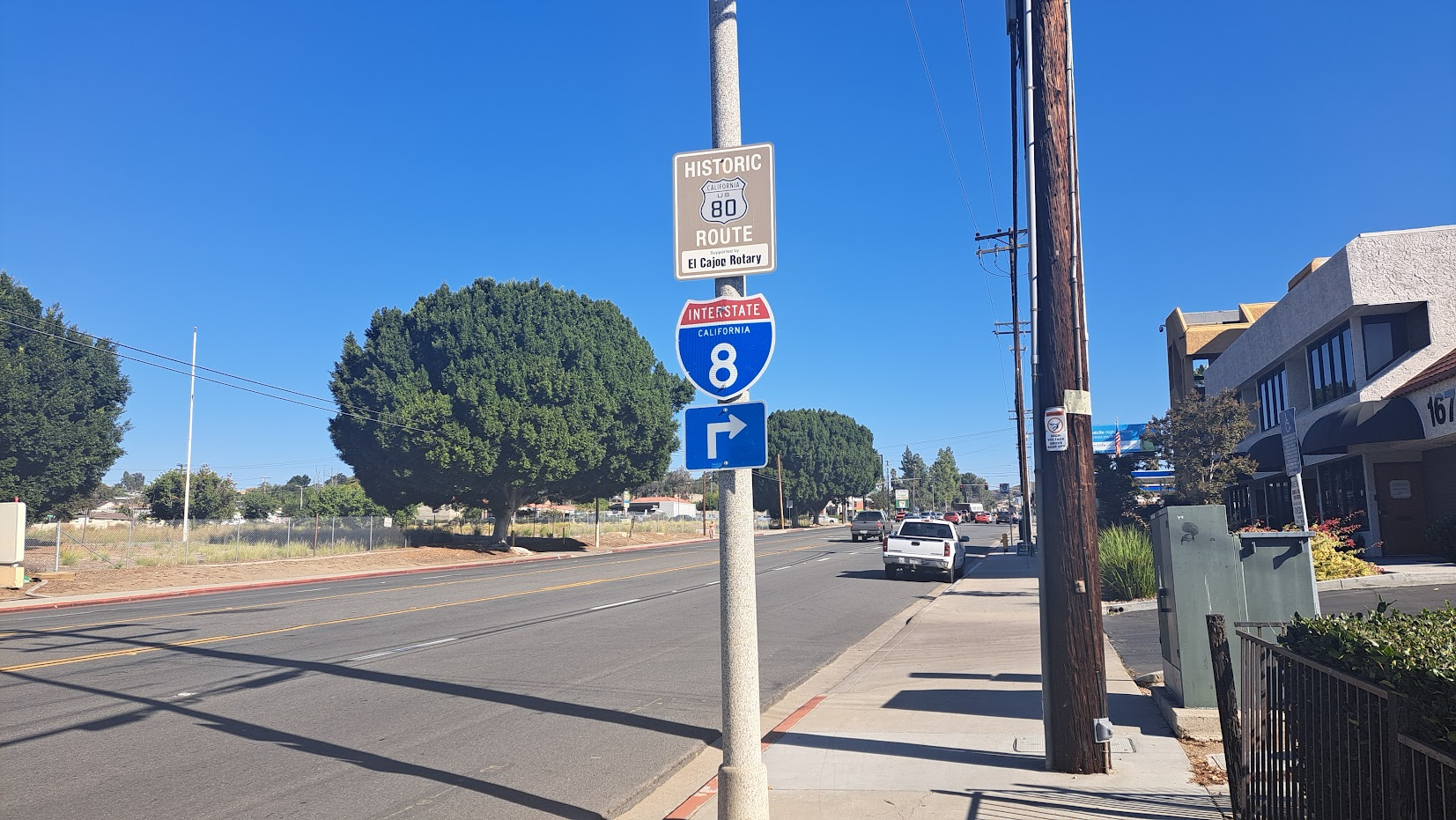
East Main Street in the City of El Cajon

== See also ==
- U.S. Route 66 in California

U.S. Route 80
Previous state: Terminus	California	Next state: Arizona
