= Mountain Empire, San Diego =

Coordinates: 32.66364°N 116.811408°W

Mountain Empire
- Region of the San Diego Metro Area
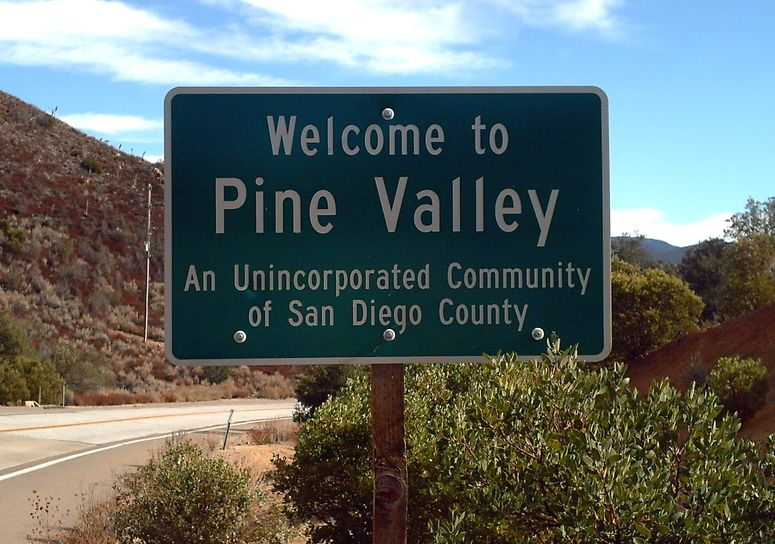
- Pine Valley in the Mountain Empire
- Interactive map of Mountain Empire
- County: San Diego County

The Mountain Empire is a rural area in southeastern San Diego County, California. The Mountain Empire subregion consists of the backcountry communities in southeastern San Diego County. The area is also sometimes considered part of the East County region of San Diego County.

== Geography ==
The Mountain Empire occupies the largely hilly, rugged terrain of the Laguna Mountains and foothills between Interstate 8 and the Mexico–United States border east of Otay Mountain and west of Imperial County. Communities located just north of Interstate 8, such as Descanso, Guatay and Pine Valley, are generally included within the region, while those further north, such as Julian, are not. The Pacific Crest Trail has its southern terminus on the Mexican border near Campo. Portions of the Mountain Empire are located in the Descanso Ranger District of the Cleveland National Forest.

California State Route 94 and Interstate 8 are the primary highways through the region. Historic U.S. Route 80 also passes through the Mountain Empire, as does the now disused San Diego and Arizona Eastern Railway.

Natural features in the region include Mount Laguna at 6,302 feet (1,921 m) in elevation, eastern Barrett Lake reservoir, Campo Creek, Carrizo Gorge, Cottonwood Creek, Miller Creek, and Pine Valley Creek.

== Communities ==
=== Census-designated places ===
Populations are as of the 2020 census:

- Campo - 2,955
- Pine Valley - 1,645
- Descanso - 1,499
- Potrero - 648
- Jacumba Hot Springs - 540
- Boulevard - 359
- Mount Laguna - 74

=== Other unincorporated communities ===
- Bankhead Springs
- Boulder Oaks
- Buckman Springs
- Dulzura
- Guatay
- Manzanita
- Tecate
- Tierra del Sol

=== Indian reservations ===
Federally recognized tribes and bands of the Kumeyaay people have Indian reservations with communities in the Mountain Empire region and southern Laguna Mountains. They include (populations as of 2020 census):

- Campo Indian Reservation - 398
- Manzanita Band of Diegueño Mission Indians - 101
- La Posta Band of Diegueño Mission Indians - 50
- Ewiiaapaayp Band of Kumeyaay Indians - 5

The San Diego County Sheriff's Office provides patrol and law enforcement services to the Mountain Empire region.

== Education ==
The region is served by the Mountain Empire Unified School District, which consists of six elementary schools and Mountain Empire High School.

The Mountain Empire Unified School District is geographically the largest school district in California, occupying over 600 square miles (1,600 km^{2}).

== Media ==
The Mountain Empire is served by countywide publications such as the San Diego Union-Tribune and the San Diego Reader. Regionally, it is served by East County Magazine.
