= California State Route 98 =

Highway in California

State Route 98

- SR 98 highlighted in red

Route information
- Maintained by Caltrans
- Length: 56.858 mi (91.504 km)
- Existed: 1933–present

Major junctions
- West end: I-8 near Ocotillo
- CR S2 near Ocotillo; CR S29 near Mount Signal; CR S30 in Mount Signal; CR S31 near Calexico; SR 111 in Calexico; SR 7 near Bonds Corner; CR S33 near Bonds Corner
- East end: I-8 east of Holtville

Location
- Country: United States
- State: California
- Counties: Imperial

Highway system
- State highways in California; Interstate; US; State; Scenic; History; Pre‑1964; Unconstructed; Deleted; Freeways
← US 97	→ US 99

State Route 98 (SR 98) is a state highway in the U.S. state of California. It is a loop of Interstate 8 (I-8) running west to east south of the Interstate through the border city of Calexico. It passes through the city of Calexico and ends east of Holtville. The highway was added to the state highway system in 1933, and signed as Route 98 by 1938. The highway was paved and rerouted to its current path during the 1950s.

== Route description ==
Route 98 is defined in section 398 of the California Streets and Highways Code, and that the highway is "from Route 8 near Coyote Wells to Route 8 via Calexico".

SR 98 begins at an interchange with I-8 southwest of the community of Ocotillo. The highway intersects CR S2 and passes south of Coyote Wells before turning due east through the Yuha Desert. After over forty miles of desert, SR 98 intersects with CR S29 and then CR S30, the latter in the community of Mount Signal. The road passes over the New River and intersects CR S31 before entering the border city of Calexico, just opposite from Mexicali, the capital of the Mexican state of Baja California. SR 98 intersects SR 111, the north-south highway connecting Mexicali and El Centro, before leaving the city and continuing east through rural Imperial County. After meeting SR 7, SR 98 goes through the community of Bonds Corner before intersecting CR S33. SR 98 then parallels the All American Canal before terminating at I-8 at Midway Well.

The portion of SR 98 from SR 111 east to I-8 is designated as part of the Juan Bautista de Anza National Historic Trail auto tour route, promoted by the National Park Service. SR 98 in Calexico is part of the National Highway System, a network of highways that are considered essential to the country's economy, defense, and mobility by the Federal Highway Administration. In 2013, SR 98 had an annual average daily traffic (AADT) of 1,400 at the western terminus with I-8, and 26,500 between Rockwood Avenue and Heber Avenue in Calexico, the latter of which was the highest AADT for the highway.

== History ==
The highway was originally designated as Route 202 in 1933. By 1934, a road headed due south from Seeley, before turning east through Calexico and curving slightly to the north and then east again through Bonds Corners. The easternmost portion of the highway was unpaved. In 1935, a contract was awarded for "grading and surfacing" the portion from East Highline Canal to Midway Wells. By 1938, the road from Coyote Wells east to the then-current routing had been constructed, but was a county road; the entirety of Route 98, which was signed, was either gravel or asphalt. Between 1952 and 1954, the western portion of SR 98 was rerouted onto the county road, moving the western terminus to southwest of Coyote Wells; however, the new portion was not paved. By 1956, the entire highway was paved. In the 1964 state highway renumbering, the highway was officially renumbered as Route 98. I-8 was extended to the western terminus of SR 98 by 1965, and to the eastern terminus of SR 98 by 1970.

== Major intersections ==
Except where prefixed with a letter, postmiles were measured on the road as it was in 1964, based on the alignment that existed at the time, and do not necessarily reflect current mileage. Postmile prefixes include: R reflecting a realignment in the route since then, M indicating a second realignment, L referring to an overlap due to a correction or change, and T indicating postmiles classified as temporary. Segments that remain unconstructed or have been relinquished to local control may be omitted. The entire route is in Imperial County.

Location	Postmile	Destinations	Notes
	R0.30	I-8 west – San Diego	Interchange; westbound exit and eastbound entrance; west end of SR 98; I-8 exit 87.
	1.52	CR S2 north (Imperial Highway) to I-8 east – Ocotillo, Plaster City, El Centro	
	22.20	CR S29 north (Drew Road) to I-8 – Seeley	
Mount Signal		CR S30 north (Brockman Road)	Southern terminus of CR S30
	30.27	CR S31 north (Dogwood Road)	
Calexico	32.31	SR 111 (Imperial Avenue) to I-8 – El Centro, Calexico	Former US 99
Calexico	39.56	SR 7 – International Border	
	43.68	CR S33 north (Bonesteele Road)	
	56.88	I-8 – El Centro, Yuma	Interchange; east end of SR 98; I-8 exit 143.
1.000 mi = 1.609 km; 1.000 km = 0.621 mi
