= California State Route 80 =

Three highways in the U.S. state of California have been signed as Route 80:

- Interstate 80 in California, part of the Interstate Highway System, with the westernmost segment being a state highway.
  - Interstate 80 Business (Sacramento, California)
- U.S. Route 80 in California (1928-1964)
