= Calexico East Port of Entry =

Border crossing between Mexico and the U.S.

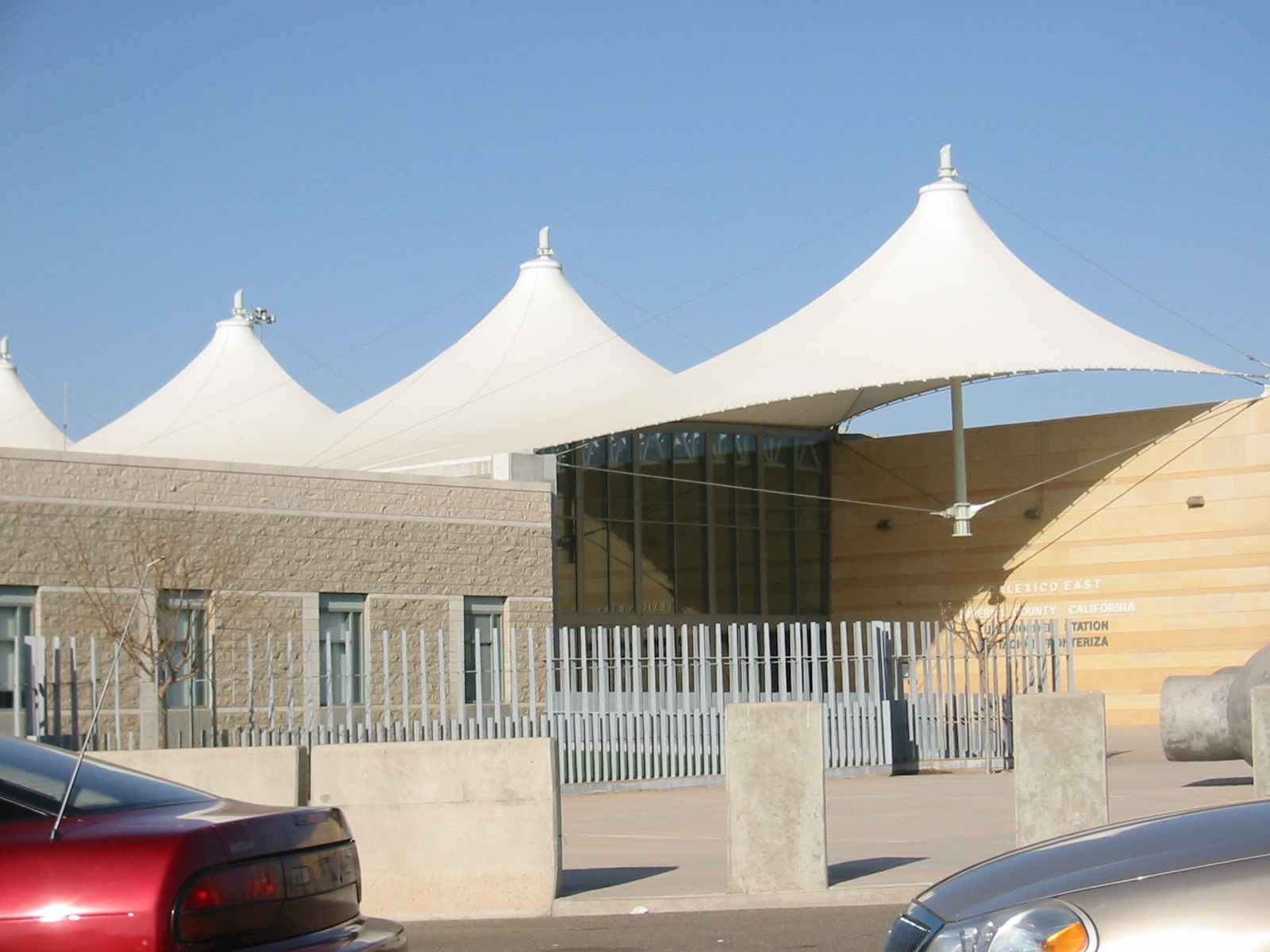
- Calexico East Border Inspection Station

Location
- Country: United States
- Location: 1699 East Carr Road, Calexico, CA 92231
- Coordinates: 32.675506°N 115.388675°W

Details
- Opened: 1996

Statistics
- 2011 Cars: 2,784,769
- 2011 Trucks: 312,973
- Pedestrians: 117,624

Website
- http://www.cbp.gov/contact/ports/calexico-east-class

The Calexico East Port of Entry is a border crossing point between the United States and Mexico. It connects the cities of Calexico, California and Mexicali, Baja California. It connects directly to California State Route 7.

The east crossing was built in 1996 in an effort to divert traffic from the busy Calexico West Port of Entry in downtown Calexico, California. Since that time, all truck traffic entering the United States from Mexicali is inspected at Calexico East. The facility is constructed of tent-like canopies and includes a bridge that crosses the All American Canal. It is a "Class A" service port with a full range of cargo processing functions.

In 2011 the site added a "Ready Lane", which allows rapid crossing if all the adults in the vehicle have a travel document enabled with Radio Frequency Identification (RFID) technology.

== See also ==
- List of Mexico–United States border crossings
