= Manzanita Band of Diegueno Mission Indians =

Native Kumeyaay Indians in Southern California

Manzanita Band of Diegueño Mission Indians
'Esnyaaw Weyaq (Kumiai)
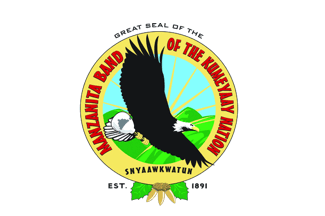

Total population
- 67 enrolled members

Regions with significant populations
- United States (California)

Languages
- Kumeyaay, English

Religion
- Traditional tribal religion, Christianity (Roman Catholicism)

Related ethnic groups
- other Kumeyaay tribes, Cocopa, Quechan, Paipai and Kiliwa

The Manzanita Band of Diegueño Mission Indians of the Manzanita Reservation is a federally recognized tribe of Kumeyaay Indians, who are sometimes known as part of the Mission Indians.

== Culture ==
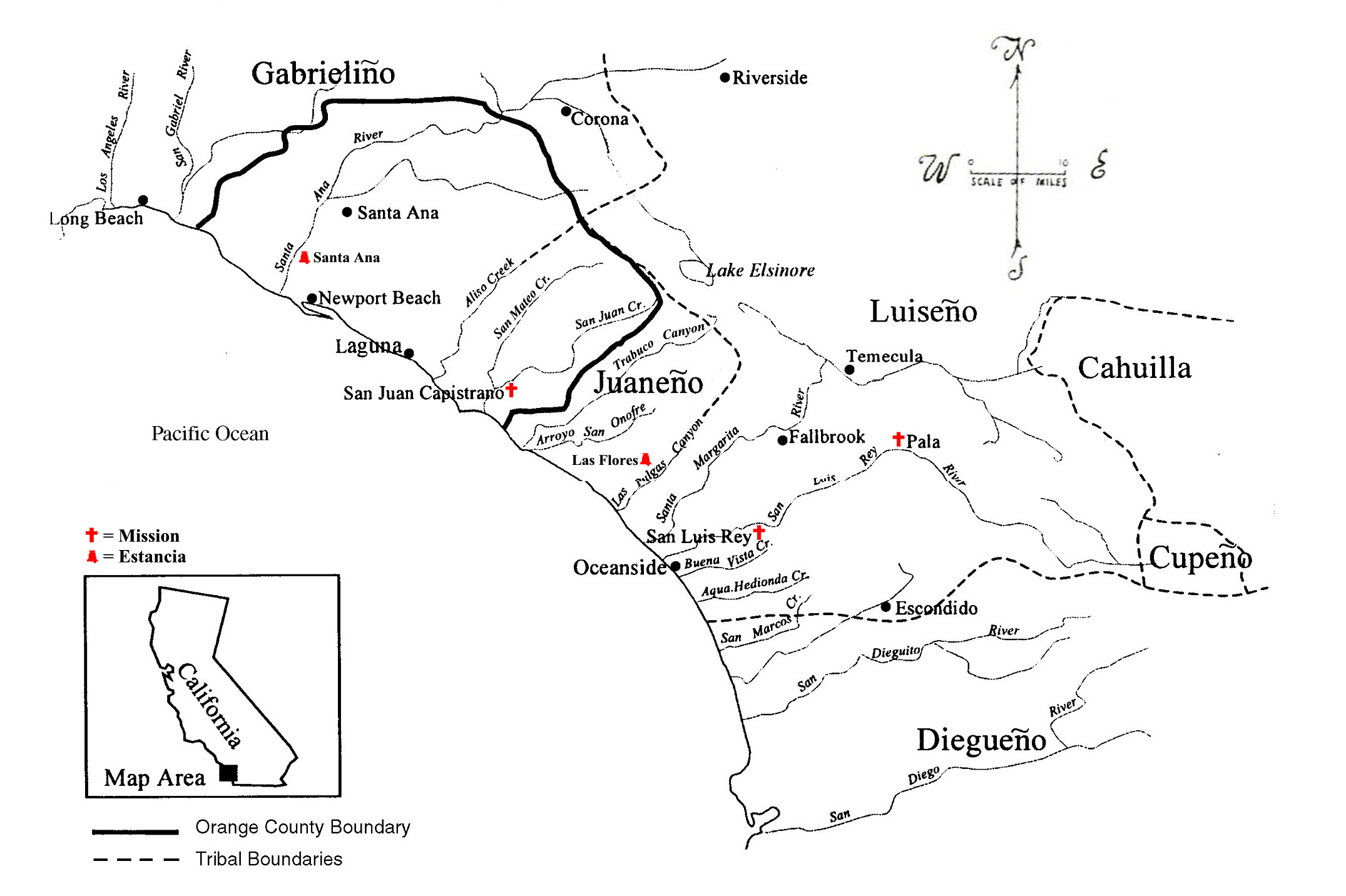
Southern California Indian Tribal Borders

Because the Manzanita Band is one of the Kumeyaay band of Indians, their culture has everything to do with the Kumeyaays. For example, Kumeyaay customs are passed through generations and they gather in both times of celebration and griefs. Kumeyaay Culture deals a lot with songs. Song showed them how to survive and contains the collective wisdom of the Kumeyaay. Some popular songs include the Bird Songs and the Eagle Dance. The social structure of the bands included the shiimull, which is an ancestral descent group, that is governed by a hierarchy of kwaaypaays. In 1769, when the Spanish arrived, there were around 50 and 75 shiimull, or bands existed. Each one of these bands included 5 to 15 family groups. Kumeyaay Indians also foraged for flora that they can use and hunt for animals depending on the season. Besides hunting for food, the Kumeyaay also planted trees and fields of grain, squash, beans and corn gathered and grew medicinal herbs and plants, and ate floras like fresh fruits, berries, pine nuts and acorn. They are also known for their basket weaving. The people had sophisticated practices of agriculture, plant and animal husbandry; maintained wild animal stocks, They also built dams and created watersheds that stored groundwater. Another thing was they also controlled erosion and overgrowth.

== Reservation ==
Location of Manzanita Reservation

The Manzanita Reservation (Kumiai: 'Esnyaaw Weyaq; 32°45′17″N 116°20′46″W) is a federal Indian reservation located in the southern Laguna Mountains near Boulevard, in southeastern San Diego County, California. It is within ten miles (16 km) north of the US-Mexico Border and is in the Dieguno Region.The reservation is also 67 miles east of the city San Diego on Interstate 8. Through the authority of the Executive Order of 1891, the reservation was built on 640 acres of reserved land in 1893. In 1907 the reserve land was increased. The reservation is now currently 3,579 acres (14.48 km^{2}) large with a population of approximately 67-69 and is held in a trust by the U.S. Government which meant the land is still technically owned by the US Government.

It was established in 1893. In 1973, 6 out of 69 enrolled members lived on the reservation. The reservation lies adjacent to both the Campo Indian Reservation and the La Posta Indian Reservation. The nearest off-reservation communities are Boulevard and Campo.

In the present day there are 13 small Kumeyaay Indian reservations in San Diego County, California; and 4 Kumiai Indio tribal community ranches in northern Baja California state, Mexico.

== Government ==
The Manzanita Band is headquartered in Boulevard. Members of the Manzanita Band belongs to the Kumeyaay Nation. They are governed by a democratically elected tribal council. All tribal members that are 18 year olders and are on the council. The council then votes for who can be on the executive community, which includes the tribal chairman, two regular members, and a secretary-treasurer. Leroy J. Elliott was formally their tribal chairperson. Now the current acting chairwoman is Angela Elliott Santos. The tribe itself is organized under the IRA constitution that was approved in 1976. Besides the executive council, the tribe also includes a housing community and management offices.

== Education ==
The reservation is served by the Mountain Empire Unified School District.

== Demographics ==
=== 2020 census ===
Manzanita Reservation and Off-Reservation Trust Land, California – Racial and ethnic composition Note: the US Census treats Hispanic/Latino as an ethnic category. This table excludes Latinos from the racial categories and assigns them to a separate category. Hispanics/Latinos may be of any race.
Race / Ethnicity (NH = Non-Hispanic)	Pop 2000	Pop 2010	Pop 2020	% 2000	% 2010	% 2020
White alone (NH)	9	12	5	13.04%	15.38%	4.95%
Black or African American alone (NH)	0	0	0	0.00%	0.00%	0.00%
Native American or Alaska Native alone (NH)	56	47	89	81.16%	60.26%	88.12%
Asian alone (NH)	2	0	1	2.90%	0.00%	0.99%
Native Hawaiian or Pacific Islander alone (NH)	1	2	0	1.45%	2.56%	0.00%
Other race alone (NH)	0	0	0	0.00%	0.00%	0.00%
Mixed race or Multiracial (NH)	0	5	2	0.00%	6.41%	1.98%
Hispanic or Latino (any race)	1	12	4	1.45%	15.38%	3.96%
Total	69	78	101	100.00%	100.00%	100.00%
