= Bonds Corner, California =

Unincorporated community in California, United States

Bonds Corner
- Unincorporated community
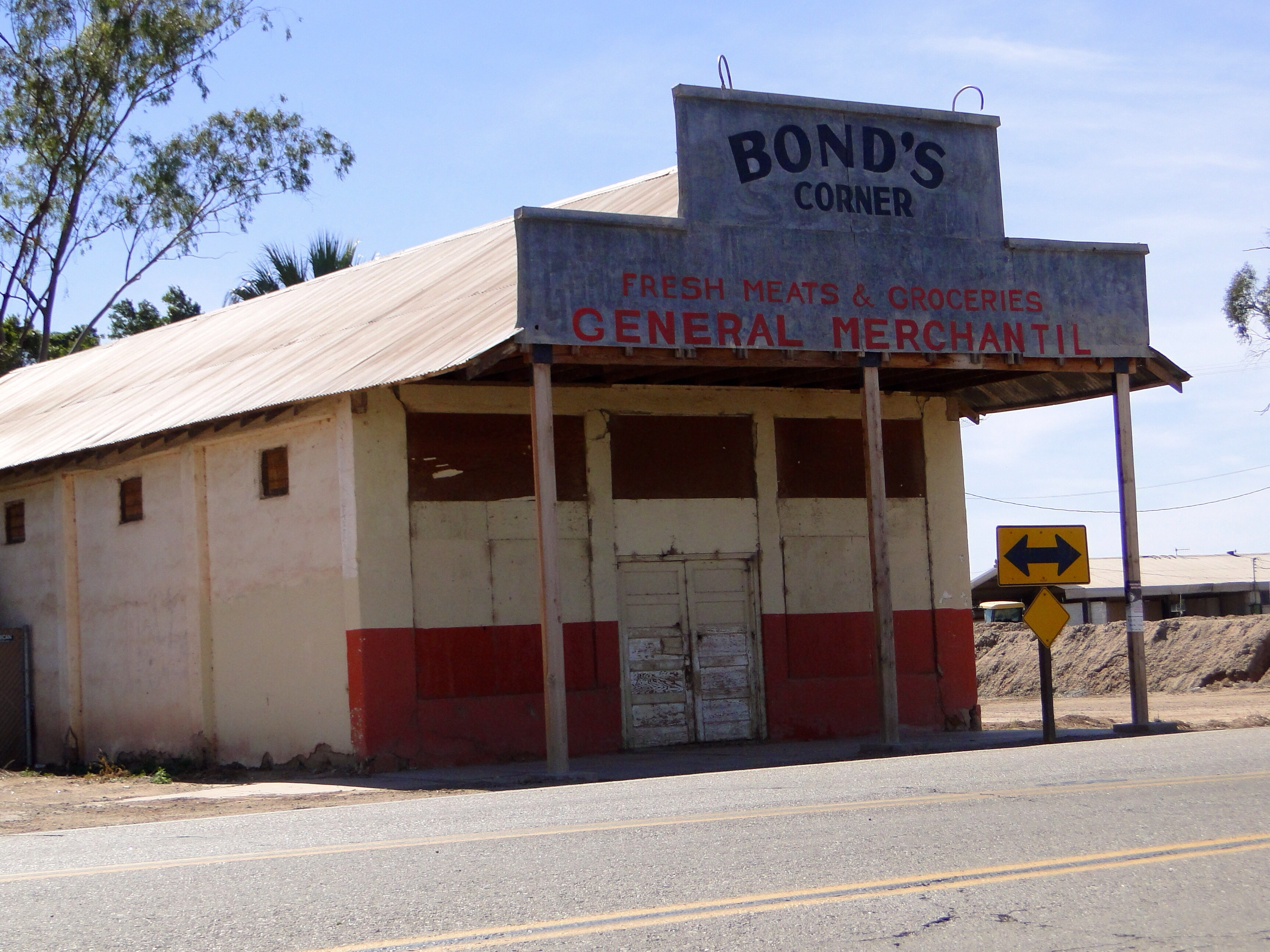
- An abandoned building in Bond's Corner

- Location in California Bonds Corner (the United States)
- Coordinates: 32°41′37″N 115°20′14″W
- Country: United States
- State: California
- County: Imperial County
- Elevation: 33 ft (10 m)

Bonds Corner (formerly, Bends Corner) is an unincorporated community in Imperial County, California a short distance east of Calexico on California State Route 98 and north of the international border with Baja California. A United States port of entry for trucks entering and exiting the country is located along nearby California State Route 7. Bonds Corner is located 9 miles (14 km) east of Calexico, at an elevation of 33 feet (10 m).

A post office operated at Bonds Corner from 1929 to 1930. The name honors Dr. J. L. Bond, homesteader.
