= Guatay, California =

Unincorporated community in California, United States

Guatay Kwataay or 'Ewaa 'Etay (Kumiai)
- Unincorporated community
- Location within San Diego County Location within California Location within the United States
- Coordinates: 32°50′56″N 116°33′26″W
- Country: United States
- State: California
- County: San Diego
- Elevation: 3,999 ft (1,219 m)
- Time zone: UTC-8 (Pacific (PST))
  - Summer (DST): UTC-7 (PDT)
- ZIP codes: 91931
- GNIS feature ID: 1656536

Guatay (Kumiai: 'Ewaa 'Etay or Kwataay) (Note: also spelled "Na-wa Ti'e", meaning "Big House") is an unincorporated community in the Cuyamaca Mountains, in the Mountain Empire area of southeastern San Diego County, California.

== Geography ==
The town's elevation is 3,999 feet (1,219 m). Although Guatay is unincorporated, it does not have a post office. The ZIP Code is 91931.

It was the location of a 19th-century stagecoach station on the San Antonio-San Diego Mail Line.

Nearby Guatay Mountain, a peak of the Cuyamaca Mountains, is home to a grove of the rare endemic Tecate cypress (Cupressus forbesii).

== Transportation ==
San Diego MTS route 888 provides service on Mondays and Fridays between El Cajon, Guatay, and Jacumba Hot Springs.
