= Mount Signal, California =

Unincorporated community in California, United States

Mount Signal
- Unincorporated community
- Location in California Mount Signal (the United States)
- Coordinates: 32°40′42″N 115°38′21″W
- Country: United States
- State: California
- County: Imperial County
- Elevation: −13 ft (−4 m)

Mount Signal is an unincorporated community located along State Route 98 about 7.5 miles (12.1 km) west of Calexico in the southern part of the Imperial Valley in Imperial County, California, United States. The area is south of Interstate 8 and about 1.7 miles (2.7 km) north of the Mexico border. It lies at an elevation of 13 feet (4 m) below sea level. This is an agricultural area. There are a few homes and businesses and many irrigation canals and green fields. The Centinela Solar Energy Project is located here. Other nearby communities include Heber, El Centro, and Seeley.

The ZIP Code for Mount Signal is 92231 and the area is in Calexico's telephone exchange area. Its area code is 760. While not a census-designated place, the name is official and it does have a National Geographic Names Database feature ID of 1661068. The official U.S. Geological Survey coordinates are 32°40′42″N 115°38′21″W: this defines a spot near the intersection of State Route 98 (SR98) and Brockman Road.

== Name ==
The community is named for Mount Signal, a summit about 5.5 miles (8.9 km) southwest, inside Mexico. It is also known as El Cerro Centinela, by the Mexicans, and Wi'Shspa, by the Kwapa: Cocopah people.

Mount Signal was used by the early Pioneers and Native Americans as a landmark to help guide them through the desert. Most of the fields in the area are currently growing alfalfa or sugar beets.

Mount Signal Road takes you to the mountain and the International Border. Unfortunately, there is not a Port of Entry there. However, there is a limited access area for off-road vehicles.

Even though Mount Signal appears to be in the United States, it is actually located on the Mexican side of the border. If one would like to climb all 2,300 feet (700 m) to the top, one must do so from the Mexican side. Climbers need to take care, there are no maintained trails. During the 1870s U.S. engineers climbed the mountain to record the elevation, so there should be a monument marker at the top.

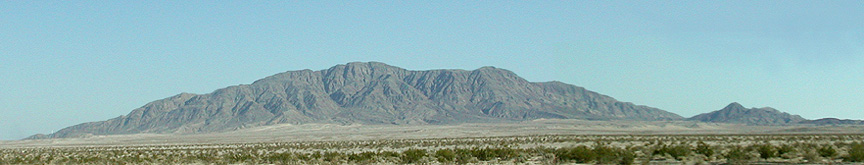
Mount Signal, viewed from the Imperial Valley, California

== History ==
A post office operated at Mount Signal from 1916 to 1934.

== Points of interest ==
Other geographic features supporting the name include Mount Signal School, feature ID of 246276. It is believed the school no longer exists; its location was one mile (1.6 km) north of these coordinates on Brockman Road.

At the intersection of SR98 and Brockman Road is the Mount Signal Café, currently closed. The business was shown on an episode of California's Gold.

== Politics ==
In the state legislature Mount Signal is located in the 40th Senate District, represented by Democrat Denise Moreno Ducheny, and in the 80th Assembly District, represented by Republican Bonnie Garcia. Federally, Mount Signal is located in California's 51st congressional district, which is represented by Democrat Juan Vargas.

== See also ==
- Mount Signal Solar — very large solar farm/station in the area.
- Natural history of the Colorado Desert
