= Centinela Solar Energy Project =

Photovoltaic power station in Imperial County, California

- Country: United States
- Location: Mount Signal, California
- Coordinates: 32°40′55″N 115°39′38″W
- Status: Operational
- Commission date: 2013; 12 years ago

Solar farm
- Type: Standard PV
- Site area: 2,067 acres (836 ha)

Power generation
- Nameplate capacity: 170 MW
- Annual net output: 510 GW·h

External links
- Website: centinelasolar.com

The Centinela Solar Energy Project is a 170 megawatt (MW) photovoltaic power plant located on 2,067 acres (836 ha) of previously disturbed private land southwest of El Centro, California. The project planned to provide at least 235 jobs, generate more than $30 million in tax revenue over its life-time, and deliver enough electricity to power about 82,500 homes. Imperial County gave a green-light to the solar power plant on December 27, 2011, and Secretary of the Interior Ken Salazar approved the right-of-way over 19 acres for the connecting power line on public land.

The plant went online in tests on July 26, 2013.

It received a safety award in 2015.

== Electricity production ==
Generation (MW·h) of Centinela Solar Energy
Year	Jan	Feb	Mar	Apr	May	Jun	Jul	Aug	Sep	Oct	Nov	Dec	Total
2013							282	4,886	10,462	8,544	11,358	14,504	50,036
2014	14,603	18,196	32,012	37,607	51,878	54,129	50,286	47,862	46,089	39,786	32,958	23,830	449,236
2015	28,339	35,985	46,237	51,300	54,417	50,941	52,063	50,917	39,754	36,827	33,023	30,048	509,851
2016	29,254	36,007	39,667	43,625	54,462	52,854	54,412	50,431	42,640	35,341	25,707	20,364	484,764
Total													1,493,887
