= Jacumba Airport =

- IATA: none; ICAO: none; FAA LID: L78

Summary
- Airport type: Public
- Owner: County of San Diego
- Serves: Jacumba, California
- Elevation AMSL: 2,844 ft (867 m)
- Coordinates: 32°36′57″N 116°09′55″W
- Interactive map of Jacumba Airport

Runways
Direction	Length		Surface
Direction	ft	m	Surface
7/25	2,508	764	Asphalt

Statistics (2006)
- Aircraft operations: 734
- Source: Federal Aviation Administration, San Diego County Department of Public Works

Jacumba Airport (FAA LID: L78) is a county-owned public-use airport one nautical mile (1.85 km) east of the central business district of Jacumba in San Diego County, California, United States.

== Facilities and aircraft ==
Jacumba Airport covers an area of 135 acres (55 ha) at an elevation of 2,844 feet (867 m) above mean sea level. It has one runway designated 7/25 with a gravel surface measuring 2,508 by 100 feet (764 x 30 m).

For the 12-month period ending December 31, 2020, the airport had 734 general aviation aircraft operations, an average of 61 per month.

== World War II ==
Jacumba Hot Springs Airport was used by the US Navy during World War II as an outlying field to support NAS San Diego.

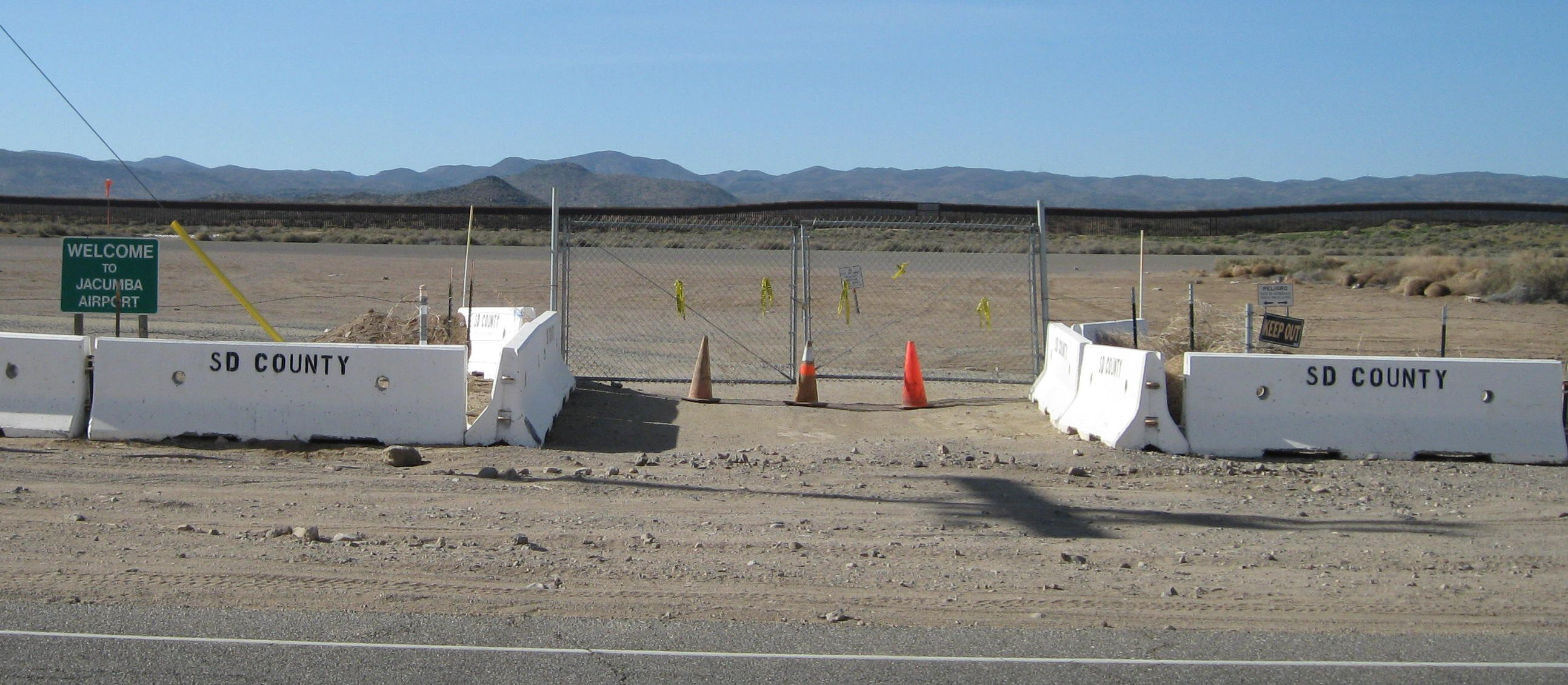
Airport entrance
