= Boulevard, California =

- Census-designated place
- Location of Boulevard in San Diego County, California.

- Location within the state of California Boulevard, California (the United States)
- Coordinates: 32°39′50″N 116°17′23″W
- Country: United States
- State: California
- County: San Diego

Area
  - Total: 3.91 sq mi (10.12 km^{2})
  - Land: 3.91 sq mi (10.12 km^{2})
  - Water: 0 sq mi (0.00 km^{2}) 0%
- Elevation: 3,638 ft (1,109 m)

Population (2020)
  - Total: 359
  - Density: 91.9/sq mi (35.49/km^{2})
- Time zone: UTC-8 (Pacific (PST))
  - Summer (DST): UTC-7 (PDT)
- ZIP codes: 91905
- Area code: 619
- FIPS code: 06-07694
- GNIS ID: 2582949

Boulevard is a census-designated place (CDP) in the Mountain Empire area of southeastern San Diego County, California. It had a population of 359 at the 2020 United States census, up from 315 in the 2010 United States census. The area is rural high desert along the Mexican border.

The Boulevard area encompasses the communities of Manzanita, Live Oak Springs and Tierra Del Sol. In addition to these, nearby communities in the same wire center (central office) for wired telephones include: Calexico Lodge, Jacumba, and Pueblo Siding. Default wired telephone numbers for this area follow the format (619) 766-xxxx. The ZIP Code is 91905.

== History ==
The Kumeyaay and Cocopah Indians were Boulevard's earliest inhabitants, and the area is rich in Native American history, culture and archeological resources. Today Boulevard is the headquarters of the Manzanita Band of Diegueno Mission Indians.

An area near Calexico Lodge is occasionally referred to as Eckener Pass. Reportedly, this is a reference to German Zeppelin pioneer Hugo Eckener. In August 1929, Eckener's Zeppelin Graf Zeppelin, a sister ship of the Hindenburg, landed here on the Los Angeles-Chicago leg of her round-the-world tour.

The town and post office were named Boulevard after US Highway 80 which ran through town. Eventually Interstate 8 was constructed, bypassing the town. Local residents report an alternate version of the origin of the name. Boulevard used to be a stage coach stop, reportedly near today's McCain Valley road, east of today's core of Boulevard. Coming from Arizona, this stop was on the first long, flat straight stretch of road, "a boulevard", after climbing the winding In-Ko-Pah mountains and passing through windier roads in Jacumba.

In January 2007, the La Posta Casino, owned and operated by the La Posta Band of Mission Indians, opened. It was the smallest casino in the county until it closed in 2012 due to its financial situation.

== Geography ==
According to the United States Census Bureau, the CDP covers an area of 3.9 square miles (10.1 km^{2}), all land. However, this only includes the village area of Boulevard. More commonly, Boulevard includes rural outlying areas. The Boulevard Community Planning Group includes approximately 55,350 acres, or about 86 square miles.

Located in the East County section of San Diego County, Boulevard with its unique transitional location straddles the Tecate Divide, between the Laguna Mountains above and the desert below, providing views of the surrounding Laguna, In-Ko-Pah and Sierra de Juarez mountains.

The community is south of Interstate 8 about 50 miles (80 km) west of El Centro. The US Post Office is plotted at 32°39′50″N 116°16′30″W although the actual post office has since moved approximately two miles west near the separation of Old Highway 80 and State Route 94. The post office, and the community it serves, has the ZIP Code 91905.

Regulatory filings show a California Department of Transportation facility described as a highway maintenance station in Boulevard. It is located in the 40000-block of Old Highway 80 on the south side at 32°39′46″N 116°15′58″W as of 1993, and still exists as of 2018.

=== Climate ===
According to the Köppen Climate Classification system, Boulevard has a warm-summer Mediterranean climate, abbreviated "Csa" on climate maps.

== Demographics ==
Historical population
Census	Pop.	Note	%±
2010	315		—
2020	359		14.0%
U.S. Decennial Census; 1860–1870 1880-1890; 1900 1910 1920; 1930 1940 1950; 1960 1970 1980; 1990 2000 2010; 2020

Boulevard first appeared as a census designated place in the 2010 U.S. census.

=== Racial and ethnic composition ===
Boulevard CDP, California – Racial and ethnic composition Note: the US Census treats Hispanic/Latino as an ethnic category. This table excludes Latinos from the racial categories and assigns them to a separate category. Hispanics/Latinos may be of any race.
Race / Ethnicity (NH = Non-Hispanic)	Pop 2010	Pop 2020	% 2010	% 2020
White alone (NH)	251	201	79.68%	55.99%
Black or African American alone (NH)	2	9	0.63%	2.51%
Native American or Alaska Native alone (NH)	6	13	1.90%	3.62%
Asian alone (NH)	3	4	0.95%	1.11%
Native Hawaiian or Pacific Islander alone (NH)	0	0	0.00%	0.00%
Other race alone (NH)	1	2	0.32%	0.56%
Mixed race or Multiracial (NH)	8	17	2.54%	4.74%
Hispanic or Latino (any race)	44	113	13.97%	31.48%
Total	315	359	100.00%	100.00%

=== 2020 census ===
As of the 2020 census, Boulevard had a population of 359. The population density was 91.9 inhabitants per square mile (35.5/km^{2}). The racial makeup of Boulevard was 213 (59.3%) White, 9 (2.5%) African American, 14 (3.9%) Native American, 4 (1.1%) Asian, 1 (0.3%) Pacific Islander, 65 (18.1%) from other races, and 53 (14.8%) from two or more races. Hispanic or Latino of any race were 113 persons (31.5%). 0.0% of residents lived in urban areas, while 100.0% lived in rural areas.

The whole population lived in households. There were 153 households, out of which 23 (15.0%) had children under the age of 18 living in them, 73 (47.7%) were married-couple households, 5 (3.3%) were cohabiting couple households, 25 (16.3%) had a female householder with no partner present, and 50 (32.7%) had a male householder with no partner present. 51 households (33.3%) were one person, and 22 (14.4%) were one person aged 65 or older. The average household size was 2.35. There were 93 families (60.8% of all households).

The age distribution was 62 people (17.3%) under the age of 18, 22 people (6.1%) aged 18 to 24, 47 people (13.1%) aged 25 to 44, 126 people (35.1%) aged 45 to 64, and 102 people (28.4%) who were 65 years of age or older. The median age was 53.3 years. For every 100 females, there were 118.9 males; for every 100 females age 18 and over, there were 121.6 males age 18 and over.

There were 197 housing units at an average density of 50.4 units per square mile (19.5 units/km^{2}), of which 153 (77.7%) were occupied. Of these, 111 (72.5%) were owner-occupied, and 42 (27.5%) were occupied by renters. The homeowner vacancy rate was 0.0% and the rental vacancy rate was 12.5%.

== Government ==
At the federal level, Boulevard is in California's 48th congressional district, represented by Republican Darrell Issa. In the California State Legislature, it is in the 18th senatorial district, represented by Democrat Steve Padilla, and the 75th Assembly district, represented by Republican Carl DeMaio.

== Education ==
Local students attend Cover Flat Elementary School, Mountain Empire Junior High School, and Mountain Empire High School.

== Transportation ==
San Diego MTS route 888 provides service on Mondays and Fridays between El Cajon, Boulevard, and Jacumba Hot Springs.

== Cultural references ==
The Alfred Hitchcock Hour episode "Goodbye, George" involves a road trip along Highway 80 through Boulevard.
