= California State Route 7 =

State highway in Imperial County, California, United States

State Route 7
- SR 7 and the car route through customs highlighted in red; the truck route through customs highlighted in blue

Route information
- Maintained by Caltrans
- Length: 6.718 mi (10.812 km)
- Existed: 1990–present

Major junctions
- South end: Mexican border near Calexico
- SR 98 near Calexico
- North end: I-8 / CR S32 near Holtville

Location
- Country: United States
- State: California
- County: Imperial

Highway system
- State highways in California; Interstate; US; State; Scenic; History; Pre‑1964; Unconstructed; Deleted; Freeways
← US 6	→ I-8

State Route 7 (SR 7) is a state highway in the U.S. state of California, running from the Calexico East Port of Entry on the border with Mexico east of Calexico north to its terminus at Interstate 8 (I-8), where Orchard Road continues the route north towards Holtville. The route provides convenient access to the country of Mexico from I-8. The highway splits to pass through the customs checkpoints: the spur route to the west is for cars, and the main highway to the east is for commercial vehicles. The southern portion of the route opened in 1996, and the rest of the route connecting to I-8 opened in 2005.

== Route description ==
Route 7 is defined in section 307 of the California Streets and Highways Code, and that the highway is "from the northerly boundary of the Federal Port of Entry near Calexico to Route 8 near El Centro".

SR 7 begins at the Calexico East Border Station, which is open from 6:00 am to 10:00 pm, seven days a week. Just north of the border, the highway splits into two roads to pass through the customs checkpoints: the fork to the west is for cars, and the fork to the east is for commercial vehicles. The California Department of Transportation (Caltrans) considers the western fork for cars as the SR 7 spur route, while the eastern fork is part of SR 7 proper. At their junction, the western fork passes over the other fork at the northern end and merges into that highway.

From the border to I-8, SR 7 is an expressway known as Orchard Road. Before reaching I-8, SR 7 travels north and has an at-grade intersection with SR 98 and a few other roads. At its northern end, SR 7 turns into County Route S32 (still Orchard Road) as it intersects with I-8. The entire route runs through the Sonoran Desert and is built to expressway standards.

The route was constructed to allow commercial traffic to travel between Mexico and the United States. SR 7 is part of the California Freeway and Expressway System, and is part of the National Highway System, a network of highways that are considered essential to the country's economy, defense, and mobility by the Federal Highway Administration. In 2013, SR 7 had an annual average daily traffic (AADT) of 2,450 at the Calexico inspection station, and 15,900 at Menvielle Road along the spur, the latter of which was the highest AADT for the highway.

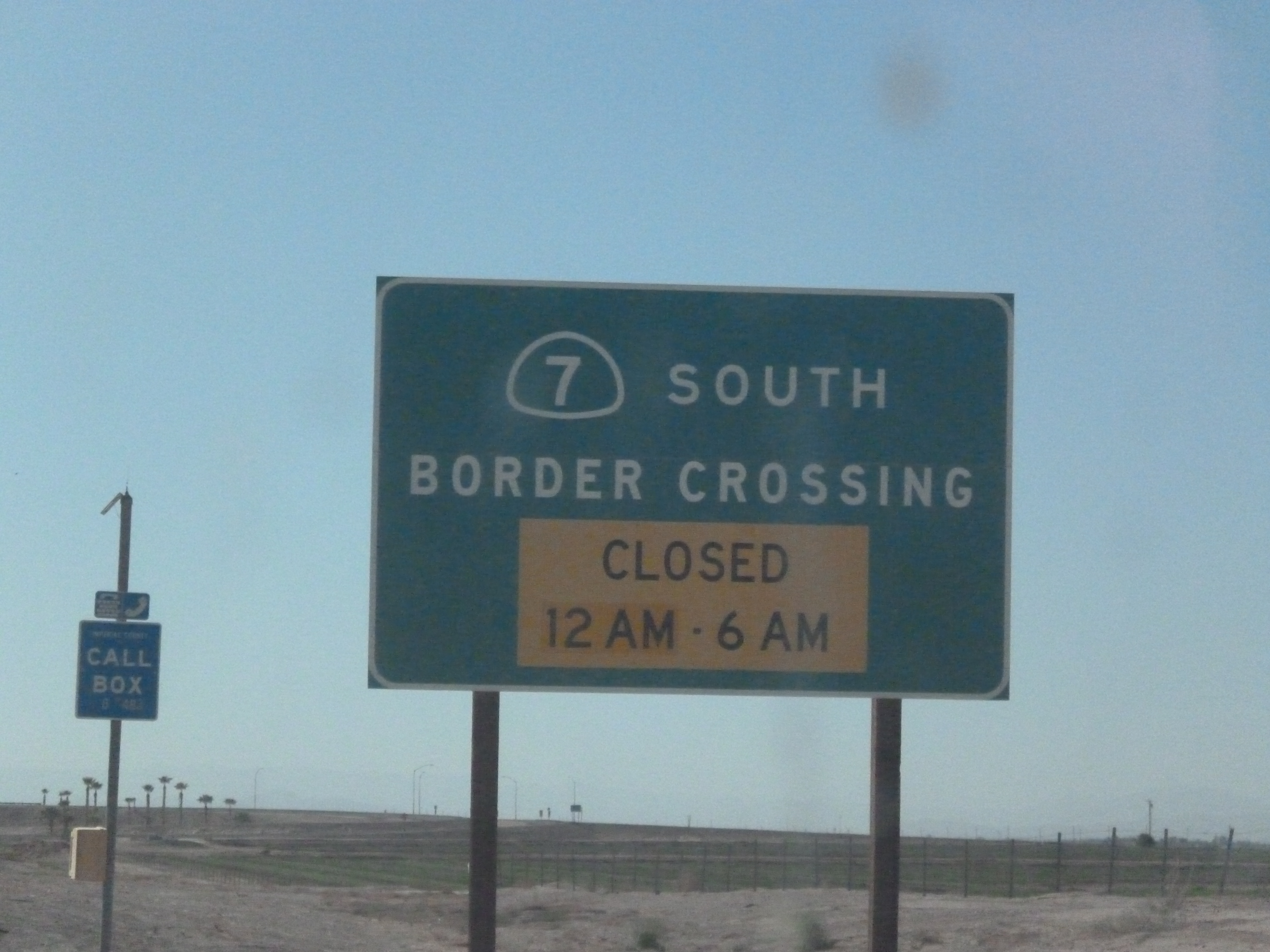
SR 7 sign

== History ==
The 1934–1964 version of SR 7 connected Palos Verdes with the Oregon border, following segments of the present-day Sierra Highway, SR 14, and US 395. The SR 7 was then used from 1964 to 1983 for the Long Beach Freeway in the Los Angeles metropolitan area, now Interstate 710.

The current SR 7 was added to the state highway system in 1990, and to the Freeway and Expressway System in 1998. The segment from the Mexican border to SR 98 was completed by March 1996 to expressway standards; this cost $9.1 million (about $16.8 million in 2024 dollars) to complete. However, the border crossing was not opened until December 2, 1996, due to delays in constructing the Mexican portion of the border crossing. Because of the 1994 economic crisis in Mexico, there were insufficient funds to complete the road leading to the border facility on the Mexican side, as well as the Mexican border facility itself. The segment from SR 98 to I-8 began construction in March 2004 at a cost of $64.5 million (about $102 million in 2024 dollars); and, it was completed in mid-2005.

== Major intersections ==
The entire route is in Imperial County.

Location	mi	km	Destinations	Notes
	0.00	0.00	Calexico East Port of Entry (truck customs)	Southern end of SR 7; traffic exits and enters the port of entry on the Mexican side at Boulevard Abelardo L. Rodríguez
	0.26	0.42	International border (cars)	Last USA interchange; southbound exit and northbound entrance; northern terminus of the SR 7 spur; connects to Nina Lee Road
	1.19	1.92	SR 98 – Calexico, Yuma	
	6.72	10.81	I-8 – San Diego, Yuma	Interchange; northern end of SR 7; I-8 exit 125
	6.72	10.81	CR S32 north (Orchard Road) – Holtville	Continuation beyond I-8
1.000 mi = 1.609 km; 1.000 km = 0.621 mi: Incomplete access

=== Spur route ===
The spur route splits off at Nina Lee Road, north of the Calexico East Port of Entry, to pass through the western customs checkpoints for cars. The entire route is in Imperial County.

Location	mi	km	Destinations	Notes
	0.00	0.00	Calexico East Port of Entry (car customs)	Southern end of SR 7 spur; traffic exits and enters the port of entry on the Mexican side at Boulevard Abelardo L. Rodríguez
	0.24	0.39	Menvielle Road	Last USA intersection
	0.54	0.87	SR 7 north	Interchange; northbound exit and southbound entrance; northern end of SR 7 spur
	0.54	0.87	Nina Lee Road	Continuation beyond SR 7 spur
1.000 mi = 1.609 km; 1.000 km = 0.621 mi: Incomplete access
