= Jacumba Hot Springs, California =

Unincorporated community in California, US

Jacumba Hot Springs Ha Kwa'pin (Kumiai)
- unincorporated community census-designated place
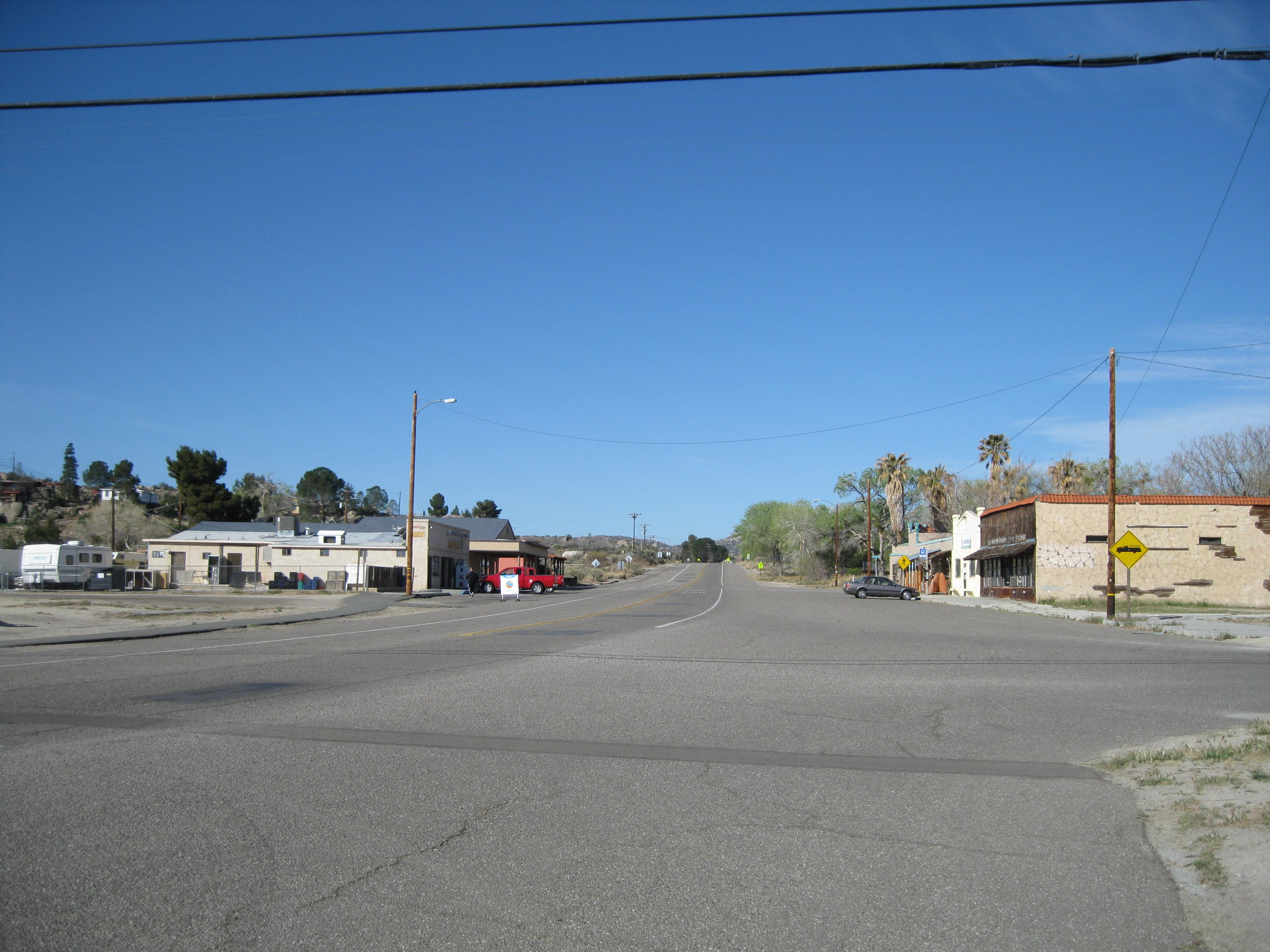
- Central Jacumba on Old Highway 80

- Location of Jacumba in San Diego County, California
- Coordinates: 32°37′1″N 116°11′17″W
- Country: United States
- State: California
- County: San Diego

Area
  - Total: 6.126 sq mi (15.867 km^{2})
  - Land: 6.119 sq mi (15.848 km^{2})
  - Water: 0.0073 sq mi (0.019 km^{2}) 0.12%
- Elevation: 3,212 ft (979 m)

Population (2020)
  - Total: 540
  - Density: 88/sq mi (34/km^{2})
- Time zone: UTC−8 (Pacific (PST))
  - Summer (DST): UTC−7 (PDT)
- ZIP Codes: 91934
- Area code: 619
- FIPS code: 06-37022
- GNIS feature ID: 2583040

Jacumba Hot Springs (/həˈkuːmbə/ hə-KOOM-bə; Kumiai: Ha Kwa'pin) is an unincorporated community in the Mountain Empire area of southeastern San Diego County, California, United States. For statistical purposes, the United States Census Bureau defined Jacumba as a census-designated place (CDP) for the first time in the 2010 census, with a population of 561. At the 2020 census, the population decreased to 540. The census definition of the area may not precisely correspond to local understanding of the area with the same name. The ZIP Code is 91934 and the town lies within area code 619. Its elevation is 2,829 feet (862 m) above mean sea level (AMSL). On February 26, 2013, the United States Board on Geographic Names approved a petition by a citizen committee to change the town's name from Jacumba to Jacumba Hot Springs.

== History ==
Landscape near Jacumba

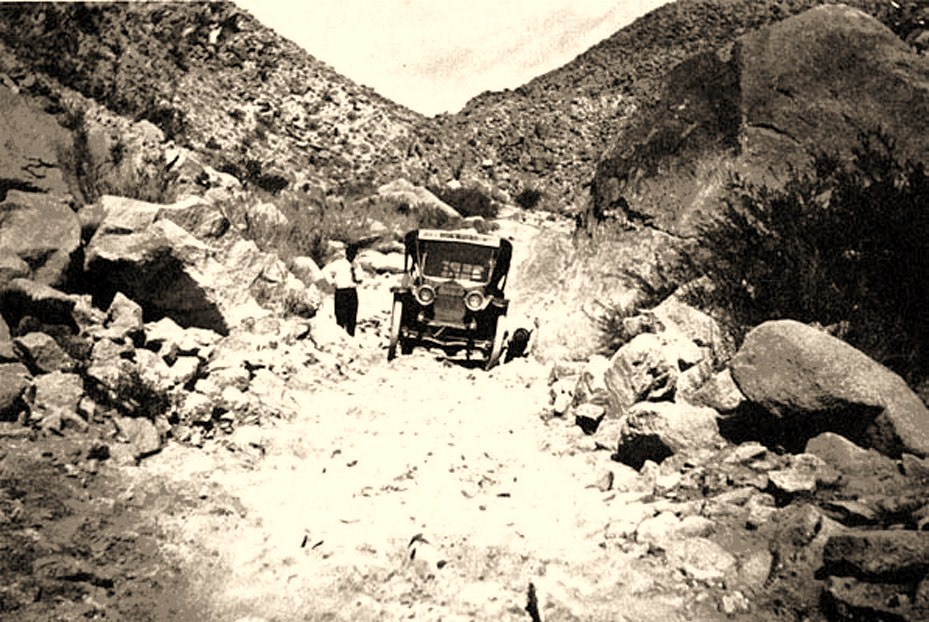
Mountain Springs grade in 1920

The Kumeyaay peoples occupied the Jacumba area prior to European settlement. They were likely attracted by the warm Jacumba hot spring (temperature 104 °F [40 °C]), one of many mineral hot springs which occur up and down the Peninsular Ranges of California. Ranchers occupied the area in the 19th century and were often in conflict with the indigenous population. Fifteen Kumeyaay and one White died in an event connected to alleged cattle rustling during the Jacumba Massacre of February 27, 1880.

Around the turn of the 20th century, the health and relaxation benefits of natural hot springs began to be commercialized. The Jacumba hot spring is prolific and delivered enough water to fill large public baths, the remains of which can still be seen. The water contains sulfur but has a pleasant clean smell. In 1919 rail service on the San Diego and Arizona Eastern Railway connected Jacumba to San Diego. By 1925 the town had a world class hotel, the Hotel Jacumba. In the 1930s, Jacumba had developed into a top destination and had a population of about 1,150. Many of the foremost movie stars and celebrities of the time regarded Jacumba as a prime destination for relaxation.

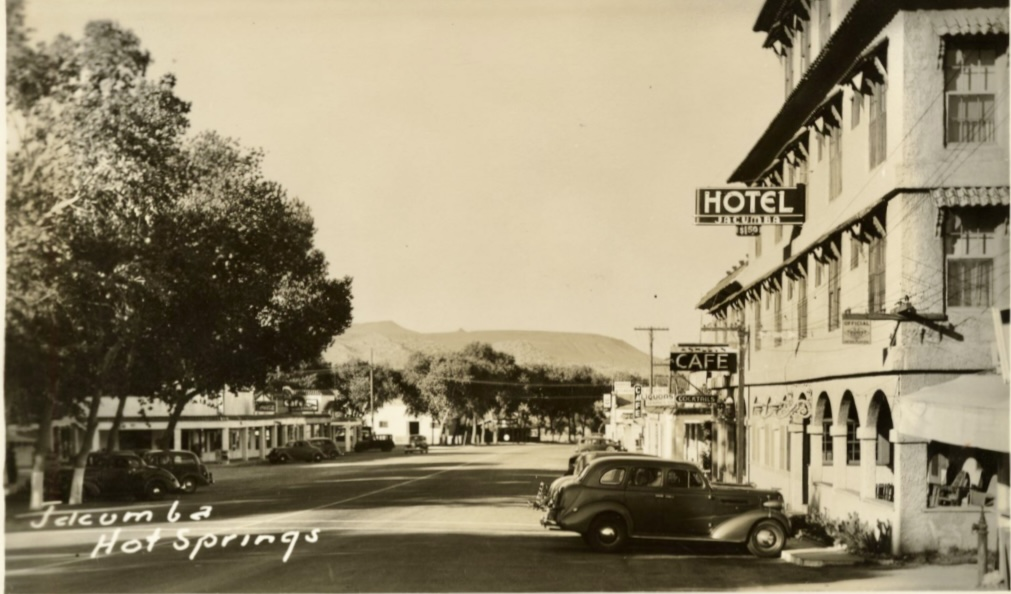
Jacumba Hot Springs in the 1940s (California State Library Digital)

Jacumba's role as a prime destination continued through World War II. As the southernmost California hot spring, it began to feel competition from more northern ones, including Murrieta and Palm Springs.

In 1951, the entire town was placed on the real-estate market, with an asking price of $400,000. Newspaper advertisements described the town as "Approx. 300 acres of land, a 65-rm. hotel, 32-unit auto court, 18-unit apt. house, 20 commercial rentals, 35 dwellings & cottages, total 101 bldgs., a water company, equipment, swimming pool, park & furnishings", with "aged owner" as the reason for the sale.

After the Interstate 8 bypassed Jacumba by two miles, most of the roadside service businesses folded and the community went into economic decline.

The Jacumba Hotel closed and was destroyed in an arson fire in 1983. The ruins stood until 1991. Today, the stub of the massive central fireplace can still be seen. The great public baths closed, the swimming pool was filled in, and the well was capped by its rights-owner.

In the 1980s, the Jacumba Motel was the only hotel facility left in Jacumba. The area continues to attract primarily foreign visitors and the motel has acquired rights to the spring and opened a spa. In 2002 the facility was sold with the intent of renovating it into a timeshare spa-type resort. In 2006 it was resold and set up as a bed and breakfast. The facility was closed in from 2010 to 2013. After a complete renovation, it was re-opened on June 28, 2013. It is in operation as the Jacumba Hot Springs Spa and Motel.

== Geography ==
The town is in a valley in the Jacumba Mountains at an altitude of 2,800 feet (850 m). The area is dry with an annual average rainfall of 11.8 inches (300 mm). It is served by Old Highway 80; Interstate 8 bypasses the town at a distance of two miles (3 km). The town is located in the Pacific time zone (GMT −08:00).

Jacumba Hot Springs is located on the Mexican border. A small settlement exists on the Mexican side, known as Jacume; the unmanned crossing was closed in 1995. The new, enlarged border fence now runs through the area. The United States Border Patrol maintains an increased presence in the area to curtail smuggling and illegal immigration.

According to the United States Census Bureau, the CDP covers an area of 6.1 square miles (15.9 km^{2}), 99.88% of it land, and 0.12% of it water.

== Demographics ==
Historical population
Census	Pop.	Note	%±
2010	561		—
2020	540		−3.7%
U.S. Decennial Census; 1860–1870 1880-1890; 1900 1910 1920; 1930 1940 1950; 1960 1970 1980; 1990 2000 2010; 2020

Jacumba first appeared as a census designated place in the 2010 U.S. census.

Jacumba CDP, California – Racial and ethnic composition Note: the US Census treats Hispanic/Latino as an ethnic category. This table excludes Latinos from the racial categories and assigns them to a separate category. Hispanics/Latinos may be of any race.
Race / Ethnicity (NH = Non-Hispanic)	Pop 2010	Pop 2020	% 2010	% 2020
White alone (NH)	322	289	57.40%	53.52%
Black or African American alone (NH)	4	20	0.71%	3.70%
Native American or Alaska Native alone (NH)	11	7	1.96%	1.30%
Asian alone (NH)	6	1	1.07%	0.19%
Native Hawaiian or Pacific Islander alone (NH)	0	1	0.00%	0.19%
Other race alone (NH)	0	2	0.00%	0.37%
Mixed race or Multiracial (NH)	11	27	1.96%	5.00%
Hispanic or Latino (any race)	207	193	36.90%	35.74%
Total	561	540	100.00%	100.00%

=== 2020 ===
The 2020 United States census reported that Jacumba had a population of 540. The population density was 88.2 inhabitants per square mile (34.1/km^{2}). The racial makeup of Jacumba was 325 (60.2%) White, 20 (3.7%) African American, 19 (3.5%) Native American, 1 (0.2%) Asian, 1 (0.2%) Pacific Islander, 97 (18.0%) from other races, and 77 (14.3%) from two or more races. Hispanic or Latino of any race were 193 persons (35.7%).

The whole population lived in households. There were 241 households, out of which 52 (21.6%) had children under the age of 18 living in them, 84 (34.9%) were married-couple households, 22 (9.1%) were cohabiting couple households, 71 (29.5%) had a female householder with no partner present, and 64 (26.6%) had a male householder with no partner present. 97 households (40.2%) were one person, and 49 (20.3%) were one person aged 65 or older. The average household size was 2.24. There were 126 families (52.3% of all households).

The age distribution was 115 people (21.3%) under the age of 18, 25 people (4.6%) aged 18 to 24, 108 people (20.0%) aged 25 to 44, 171 people (31.7%) aged 45 to 64, and 121 people (22.4%) who were 65 years of age or older. The median age was 49.2 years. For every 100 females, there were 107.7 males.

There were 268 housing units at an average density of 43.8 units per square mile (16.9 units/km^{2}), of which 241 (89.9%) were occupied. Of these, 148 (61.4%) were owner-occupied, and 93 (38.6%) were occupied by renters.

=== 2010 ===
The 2010 United States census reported that Jacumba had a population of 561. The population density was 91.6 inhabitants per square mile (35.4/km^{2}). The racial makeup of Jacumba was 389 (69.3%) White 322 (57.4%) non-Hispanic White), 4 (0.7%) African American, 15 (2.7%) Native American, 6 (1.1%) Asian, 0 (0.0%) Pacific Islander, 114 (20.3%) from other races, and 33 (5.9%) from two or more races. Hispanic or Latino of any race were 207 persons (36.9%).

The Census reported that 561 people (100% of the population) lived in households, 0 (0%) lived in non-institutionalized group quarters, and 0 (0%) were institutionalized.

There were 216 households, out of which 66 (30.6%) had children under the age of 18 living in them, 87 (40.3%) were opposite-sex married couples living together, 29 (13.4%) had a female householder with no husband present, 12 (5.6%) had a male householder with no wife present. There were 21 (9.7%) unmarried opposite-sex partnerships, and 0 (0%) same-sex married couples or partnerships, while 72 households (33.3%) were made up of individuals, and 24 (11.1%) had someone living alone who was 65 years of age or older. The average household size was 2.60. There were 128 families (59.3% of all households); the average family size was 3.38.

The population was spread out, with 141 people (25.1%) under the age of 18, 46 people (8.2%) aged 18 to 24, 128 people (22.8%) aged 25 to 44, 167 people (29.8%) aged 45 to 64, and 79 people (14.1%) who were 65 years of age or older. The median age was 39.9 years. For every 100 females, there were 101.8 males. For every 100 females age 18 and over, there were 102.9 males.

There were 294 housing units at an average density of 48.0 per square mile (18.5/km^{2}), of which 123 (56.9%) were owner-occupied, and 93 (43.1%) were occupied by renters. The homeowner vacancy rate was 7.4%; the rental vacancy rate was 7.9%, while 288 people (51.3% of the population) lived in owner-occupied housing units and 273 people (48.7%) lived in rental housing units.

== California Historical Landmark ==
Near Jacumba is the former site of the Mountain Springs Station; California Historical Landmark number 568 reads:

NO. 194 MOUNTAIN SPRINGS STATION - From 1862-70, Peter Larkin and Joe Stancliff used a stone house about a mile north of here as a store from which ox teams pulled wagons up a 30% grade. The San Diego and Fort Yuma Turnpike Co. used the site as a toll road station until 1876. The crumbling house was replaced in 1917 by another still visible to its east. But road changes, beginning in 1878 and culminating in today's highway, have left the older stone house ruins inaccessible.

== Transportation ==
San Diego MTS route 888 provides service on Mondays and Fridays between El Cajon and Jacumba Hot Springs.

=== Airport ===
Jacumba Airport (L78) CTAF 122.9 MHz. 2500 ft. Asphalt runway.
