= Ocotillo, California =

Ocotillo
- Unincorporated community Census-designated place
- Location in Imperial County and the state of California

- Location in the United States
- Coordinates: 32°44′19″N 115°59′39″W
- Country: United States
- State: California
- County: Imperial

Area
  - Total: 8.865 sq mi (22.959 km^{2})
  - Land: 8.865 sq mi (22.959 km^{2})
  - Water: 0 sq mi (0 km^{2}) 0%
- Elevation: 377 ft (115 m)

Population (2020)
  - Total: 215
  - Density: 24.3/sq mi (9.36/km^{2})
- Time zone: UTC-8 (Pacific (PST))
  - Summer (DST): UTC-7 (PDT)
- ZIP code: 92259
- Area codes: 442/760
- FIPS code: 06-53378
- GNIS feature IDs: 1656587, 1656587

Ocotillo (Latin American Spanish: [okoˈtiʝo]; Spanish for "Vine cactus") is a census-designated place (CDP) in Imperial County, California, United States. Ocotillo is located 26 miles (42 km) west of El Centro. The population was 215 at the 2020 census, down from 266 at the 2010 census and 296 at the 2000 census. It is part of the El Centro, California Metropolitan Statistical Area.

Ocotillo was devastated by floods from Hurricane Kathleen in 1976; 3 people died. There is a cafe, a church, a small park, a community center, a small market, an art gallery, two bars, OHV rentals and a gas station. There is a Desert Museum with displays about the desert terrain, flora, etc. and artifacts from the Kumeyaay culture that inhabited the area which is located on the north side of Interstate 8.

== Geography ==
According to the United States Census Bureau, the CDP has a total area of 8.9 square miles (23 km^{2}), all of it land.

=== Climate ===
Ocotillo has a hot-desert climate with long, extremely hot summers, and mild to warm winters. The average yearly temperature is one of the highest out of any inhabited place in California. Days of 100 °F and over are quite common from late spring into early fall. Since winters, although milder, in Octillo average highs of over 70 °F, the town becomes the only inhabited place in California to not have a month averaging a high of less than 70 °F throughout the year

Precipitation is very little as Ocotillo sees about less than 3 inches of rain on average per year, making it among the driest places in California and in the United States. The winter months, which tend to be the wettest in California, see roughly a couple inches in Ocotillo. However, late summers may see some occasional monsoonal showers, but they still also come in minimal amounts.

Climate data for Ocotillo (380 feet above sea level)
Month	Jan	Feb	Mar	Apr	May	Jun	Jul	Aug	Sep	Oct	Nov	Dec	Year
Record high °F (°C)	90 (32)	93 (34)	101 (38)	109 (43)	116 (47)	121 (49)	122 (50)	120 (49)	120 (49)	112 (44)	98 (37)	95 (35)	122 (50)
Mean daily maximum °F (°C)	71 (22)	74 (23)	80 (27)	86 (30)	95 (35)	103 (39)	107 (42)	106 (41)	101 (38)	91 (33)	78 (26)	70 (21)	89 (31)
Daily mean °F (°C)	57 (14)	61 (16)	66 (19)	71 (22)	79 (26)	87 (31)	93 (34)	93 (34)	87 (31)	76 (24)	64 (18)	57 (14)	74 (24)
Mean daily minimum °F (°C)	43 (6)	47 (8)	51 (11)	56 (13)	63 (17)	70 (21)	78 (26)	79 (26)	72 (22)	61 (16)	50 (10)	43 (6)	59 (15)
Record low °F (°C)	18 (−8)	24 (−4)	29 (−2)	34 (1)	36 (2)	47 (8)	52 (11)	54 (12)	48 (9)	33 (1)	24 (−4)	22 (−6)	18 (−8)
Average precipitation inches (mm)	0.49 (12)	0.47 (12)	0.30 (7.6)	0.05 (1.3)	0.02 (0.51)	0.00 (0.00)	0.06 (1.5)	0.27 (6.9)	0.28 (7.1)	0.34 (8.6)	0.17 (4.3)	0.41 (10)	2.86 (71.81)
Source: Weather Channel

== History ==
Ocotillo is located on a site that originally sat on the edge of ancient Lake Cahuilla and is the traditional territory of the Kumeyaay. The town originated as a retirement community. The post office was opened in 1957. In March 2012, a museum, the Imperial Valley Desert Museum opened in Ocotillo after many years of fundraising and construction.

== Demographics ==
Historical population
Census	Pop.	Note	%±
2000	296		—
2010	266		−10.1%
2020	215		−19.2%
U.S. Decennial Census; 1860–1870 1880-1890; 1900 1910 1920; 1930 1940 1950; 1960 1970 1980; 1990 2000 2010

Ocotillo first appeared as a census-designated place in the 2000 U.S. census.

=== 2020 ===
The 2020 United States census reported that Ocotillo had a population of 215. The population density was 24.3 inhabitants per square mile (9.4/km^{2}). The racial makeup of Ocotillo was 161 (74.9%) White, 3 (1.4%) African American, 4 (1.9%) Native American, 3 (1.4%) Asian, 2 (0.9%) Pacific Islander, 17 (7.9%) from other races, and 25 (11.6%) from two or more races. Hispanic or Latino of any race were 37 persons (17.2%).

The whole population lived in households. There were 106 households, out of which 17 (16.0%) had children under the age of 18 living in them, 47 (44.3%) were married-couple households, 11 (10.4%) were cohabiting couple households, 18 (17.0%) had a female householder with no partner present, and 30 (28.3%) had a male householder with no partner present. 27 households (25.5%) were one person, and 12 (11.3%) were one person aged 65 or older. The average household size was 2.03. There were 67 families (63.2% of all households).

The age distribution was 31 people (14.4%) under the age of 18, 9 people (4.2%) aged 18 to 24, 32 people (14.9%) aged 25 to 44, 61 people (28.4%) aged 45 to 64, and 82 people (38.1%) who were 65 years of age or older. The median age was 61.7 years. There were 132 males and 83 females.

There were 219 housing units at an average density of 24.7 units per square mile (9.5 units/km^{2}), of which 106 (48.4%) were occupied. Of these, 74 (69.8%) were owner-occupied, and 32 (30.2%) were occupied by renters.

=== 2010 ===
The 2010 United States census reported that Ocotillo had a population of 266. The population density was 30.0 inhabitants per square mile (11.6/km^{2}). The racial makeup of Ocotillo was 242 (91.0%) White, 1 (0.4%) African American, 1 (0.4%) Native American, 2 (0.8%) Asian, 0 (0.0%) Pacific Islander, 17 (6.4%) from other races, and 3 (1.1%) from two or more races. Hispanic or Latino of any race were 61 persons (22.9%).

The Census reported that 266 people (100% of the population) lived in households, 0 (0%) lived in non-institutionalized group quarters, and 0 (0%) were institutionalized.

There were 138 households, out of which 24 (17.4%) had children under the age of 18 living in them, 50 (36.2%) were opposite-sex married couples living together, 13 (9.4%) had a female householder with no husband present, 5 (3.6%) had a male householder with no wife present. There were 3 (2.2%) unmarried opposite-sex partnerships, and 2 (1.4%) same-sex married couples or partnerships. 60 households (43.5%) were made up of individuals, and 25 (18.1%) had someone living alone who was 65 years of age or older. The average household size was 1.93. There were 68 families (49.3% of all households); the average family size was 2.60.

The population was spread out, with 44 people (16.5%) under the age of 18, 9 people (3.4%) aged 18 to 24, 33 people (12.4%) aged 25 to 44, 109 people (41.0%) aged 45 to 64, and 71 people (26.7%) who were 65 years of age or older. The median age was 56.1 years. For every 100 females, there were 111.1 males. For every 100 females age 18 and over, there were 113.5 males.

There were 323 housing units at an average density of 36.5 per square mile (14.1/km^{2}), of which 138 were occupied, of which 98 (71.0%) were owner-occupied, and 40 (29.0%) were occupied by renters. The homeowner vacancy rate was 2.8%; the rental vacancy rate was 14.9%. 189 people (71.1% of the population) lived in owner-occupied housing units and 77 people (28.9%) lived in rental housing units.

=== 2000 ===
As of the census of 2000, the median income for a household in the CDP was $23,438, and the median income for a family was $43,125. Males had a median income of $24,196 versus $55,556 for females. The per capita income for the CDP was $14,849. None of the families and 16.6% of the population were living below the poverty line, including no under eighteens and 26.2% of those over 64.

== Government ==
In the California State Legislature, Ocotillo is in the 18th senatorial district, represented by Democrat Steve Padilla, and the 36th Assembly district, represented by Republican Jeff Gonzalez.

In the United States House of Representatives, Ocotillo is in California's 25th congressional district, represented by Democrat Raul Ruiz.

== Utilities ==
Two nonprofit utilities provide water service to Ocotillo. Ocotillo Mutual Water Company provides service to part of the community and Coyote Valley Mutual Water Company provides service to the other part of the community. Outlying areas are serviced by private wells.

== See also ==
- El Centro Metropolitan Area
- San Diego–Imperial, California
