= La Posta Band of Diegueño Mission Indians =

Native Kumeyaay Indians in Southern California

Total population
- 30 adult enrolled members

Regions with significant populations
- United States (California)

Languages
- Kumeyaay, Tipai English

Religion
- Traditional Spirituality

Related ethnic groups
- other Kumeyaay tribes, Cocopa, Quechan, Paipai, and Kiliwa

The La Posta Band of Diegueño Mission Indians of the La Posta Reservation is a federally recognized tribe of the Kumeyaay Indians, who are sometimes antiquatedly referred to as Mission Indians.

== Reservation ==
Location of La Posta Reservation

The La Posta Reservation (32°44′04″N 116°23′28″W) is a federal Indian reservation located within the southern Laguna Mountains west of Boulevard, in eastern San Diego County, California. It is less than 10 miles (16 km) north of the Mexico–United States border. The reservation is 3,556 acres (14.39 km^{2}) large with a population of approximately 60. The reservation borders the Cleveland National Forest and is accessed only by one unpaved road that is usually fenced off to prevent trespassers.

== History ==
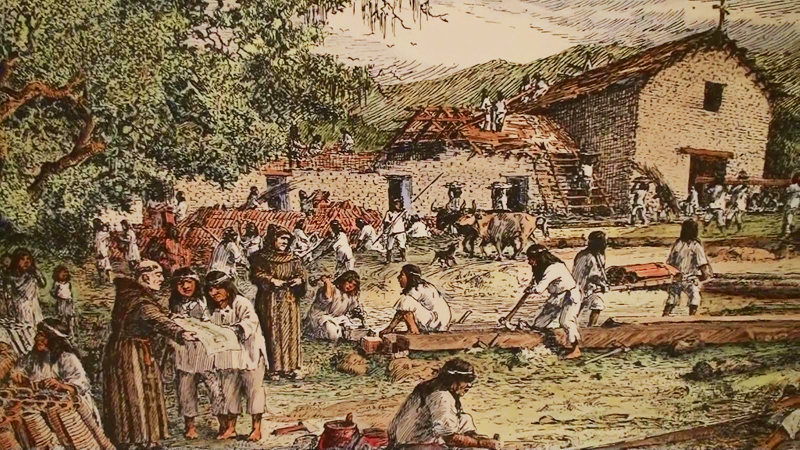
Native Americans building a Spanish Mission

== Early history ==
The La Posta Mission Indians are the living continuation of the Kumeyaay people who historically travelled seasonally across the southern California coasts, valleys, mountains and deserts. Current widely accepted archeological data shows that these tribes have been present within California for more than 12,000 years, though the Kumeyaay have asserted they have been here since the beginning of time. Current research is continuing to reveal archeological evidence of this claim. The San Diego Natural History Museum is the home of the Cerutti Mastodon sites stating, "If interpreted correctly, the Cerutti Mastodon site becomes the oldest archaeological site in the Americas, pushing back the record of early humans on this continent by more than 100,000 years". The La Posta Mission Indians are the living continuation of the Kumeyaay people who moved across the California coast, valley, mountains and the desert.

== Three waves of encroachment and the establishment of the reservation ==
Mission Indians is a term used to refer to the indigenous people of California who were forcibly removed from their lands and placed in Franciscan Missions during the mid-16th century because of Spanish settlers. There are approximately 21 Franciscan Mission within California starting from San Jose and ending in San Diego. Many of the Missions we see today are recreations of the original missions that were destroyed by the Kumeyaay an surrounding tribes resisting their genocide.

The Kumeyaay's ancestral territories extend across present-day southern California and Baja California, they endured successive waves of colonization. Spanish missionaries arrived in 1769, establishing missions that sought to forcibly convert, relocate, and control Native populations. Indigenous peoples were compelled into labor, subjected to violence, and suffered massive population loss due to disease and systemic abuse.

After Mexican independence in 1821, the secularization of the mission system did not return land to Indigenous communities. Instead, vast tracts were distributed through land grants to private individuals, further dispossessing Native people. The Kumeyaay resisted, staging organized revolts and maintaining traditional lifeways despite constant disruption.

In 1851, California's first governor, Peter Hardeman Burnett, declared that “a war of extermination will continue to be waged between the races until the Indian race becomes extinct.” This statement was not rhetoric; it reflected the policies and practices that devastated Indigenous peoples in California, including the Kumeyaay.

The U.S. acquisition of California in 1848 set up the current systems that Kumeyaay land and people exist in. Between 1851 and 1852, U.S. representatives negotiated 18 treaties with California tribes, including the Kumeyaay, that would have reserved roughly 7.5 million acres for Indigenous use. However, the U.S. Senate, under pressure from California's political leadership and land interests, refused to ratify the treaties. They ordered the documents hidden under an “injunction of secrecy,” leaving Native communities without legal recognition or protection for over 50 years. During this period, Native Californians were systematically displaced, fragmented, and killed as settlers claimed land promised—then denied—by the federal government.

In response to mounting public awareness of these injustices, the federal government issued a series of Executive Orders in 1891 establishing small reservations, including the La Posta Reservation. These reservations were often located on marginal lands and offered minimal restitution compared to what was originally negotiated.

Throughout Spanish, Mexican, and American encroachment, the Kumeyaay adapted in ways that preserved core aspects of their identity. Despite pressures to assimilate, many Kumeyaay individuals maintained cultural ties and later led movements to reassert tribal sovereignty and land rights.

Today, the La Posta Band of Mission Indians continues to uphold its sovereignty and cultural heritage. With limited economic resources the Tribe is taking steps toward rebuilding its economic base. These efforts reflect a long-standing tradition of adaptation, endurance, and resistance.

== Treaties and Kumeyaay people ==
In 1851 and 1852, following the U.S. acquisition of California through the Treaty of Guadalupe Hidalgo, federal commissioners were sent to negotiate land treaties with California Indian tribes, including the Kumeyaay. These negotiations resulted in 18 treaties that promised to reserve about 7.5 million acres, approximately one-third of the land area of California for Native use. Tribal leaders, under conditions of immense pressure and after surviving Spanish and Mexican colonization, agreed to these treaties in good faith, believing they had secured a future for their people and their lands.

However, once the treaties reached Washington D.C., California's powerful political and economic interests, especially those tied to land speculation, mining (including the gold rush around Julian), and agriculture, opposed them. They argued that granting that much land to Native peoples would block white settlement and economic exploitation of the region's resources. In response to these pressures, the U.S. Senate refused to ratify the treaties.

But the betrayal did not stop at mere rejection. Instead of publicly acknowledging their decision, the Senate placed the treaties under an "injunction of secrecy," a rare and deliberate act. This order locked away the treaties in federal archives, hidden from the public, the press, and critically, from the Native nations themselves. California tribes, including the Kumeyaay, continued to live under the belief that their lands were protected, even as settlers flooded into the state, violently displacing them, stealing land, committing acts of brutality, and destroying Native communities with no legal recourse available.

The Kumeyaay, like many California tribes, were trapped: deprived of treaty protections, subjected to legalized violence (including state-funded Indian hunting militias), and economically marginalized, yet they continued to fight for survival.

The full existence of the unratified treaties was not officially revealed until 1905—more than fifty years after they had been signed—after Indigenous advocates and allies demanded an investigation. By that time, much of the promised land had been seized, developed, or destroyed.

This act of deliberate concealment stands as one of the clearest examples of state-sponsored treachery in U.S. history, directly contributing to the genocidal conditions Native Californians endured. Despite this, the Kumeyaay people, including the La Posta Band, persisted. They maintained cultural, political, and spiritual practices across generations, laying the foundation for the survival of their nations into the present day.

== Language ==
La Posta Band Mission Indians speak two languages English, and Tiipai The natives can speak two languages, including the different dialects of the surrounding Kumeyaay nation. Tiipai is mainly seen in tribes that are in the Southern Kumeyaay territory commonly referred to as Baja and southern California. Tiipai belongs to the Yuman branch of the greater Hokan linguistic family. With regards to Kumeyaay, this tribe is able to speak different Kumeyaay language dialects based on its ancestral origins that derived from the greater Kumeyaay nation. Cultural and spiritual practices are also shared and understood across the nation.

== Government ==
The La Posta Band is headquartered in Boulevard. They are governed by a democratically elected tribal council. Eric LaChappa Sr. is their current tribal chairperson. Although the reservation has an executive council, the La Posta Reservation is governed by a general council which includes all adult members in a direct democracy. Elected council members include a chairperson, a vice-chairperson, secretary/Treasurer and two council members at large. Elected members serve two-year terms, and the council meets twice a month. The band is organized under an IRA constitution that was approved on March 5, 1973.

== Economic development ==
The La Posta Band of Mission Indians currently operates a cannabis dispensary scheduled to open in May 2025. This enterprise represents an important step toward economic self-sufficiency and tribal revenue generation. While modest in scale, it reflects the Tribe's broader goals of exercising sovereignty, creating employment opportunities for members, and generating funds that can be reinvested into community programs, cultural initiatives, and infrastructure. In the face of limited economic resources and historical underinvestment, ventures like this are critical to building long-term stability and self-determined growth for the La Posta Band. The tribe also owned and operated the La Posta Casino and Marie's Restaurant in Boulevard which closed in 2012.

== Education ==
The La Posta Band of Mission Indians primarily receives education through the Mountain Empire Unified School District, founded in 1923, and the La Posta Learning Center. Education is central to the community, serving both academic and professional development and the preservation of cultural knowledge. The Kumeyaay people have long maintained expertise in land management, governance, language, and intergenerational teaching. Today, education continues to integrate ancestral knowledge with contemporary skills, supporting the community's sovereignty, cultural identity, and responsibilities to future generations.

== Demographics ==
=== 2020 census ===
La Posta Reservation, California – Racial and ethnic composition Note: the US Census treats Hispanic/Latino as an ethnic category. This table excludes Latinos from the racial categories and assigns them to a separate category. Hispanics/Latinos may be of any race.
Race / Ethnicity (NH = Non-Hispanic)	Pop 2000	Pop 2010	Pop 2020	% 2000	% 2010	% 2020
White alone (NH)	2	18	7	11.11%	32.73%	14.00%
Black or African American alone (NH)	1	0	1	5.56%	0.00%	2.00%
Native American or Alaska Native alone (NH)	12	20	20	66.67%	36.36%	40.00%
Asian alone (NH)	0	1	0	0.00%	1.82%	0.00%
Native Hawaiian or Pacific Islander alone (NH)	0	0	0	0.00%	0.00%	0.00%
Other race alone (NH)	0	1	0	0.00%	1.82%	0.00%
Mixed race or Multiracial (NH)	0	0	11	0.00%	0.00%	22.00%
Hispanic or Latino (any race)	3	15	11	16.67%	27.27%	22.00%
Total	18	55	50	100.00%	100.00%	100.00%
