= Coyote Wells, California =

Unincorporated community in California, United States

Coyote Wells
- Unincorporated community
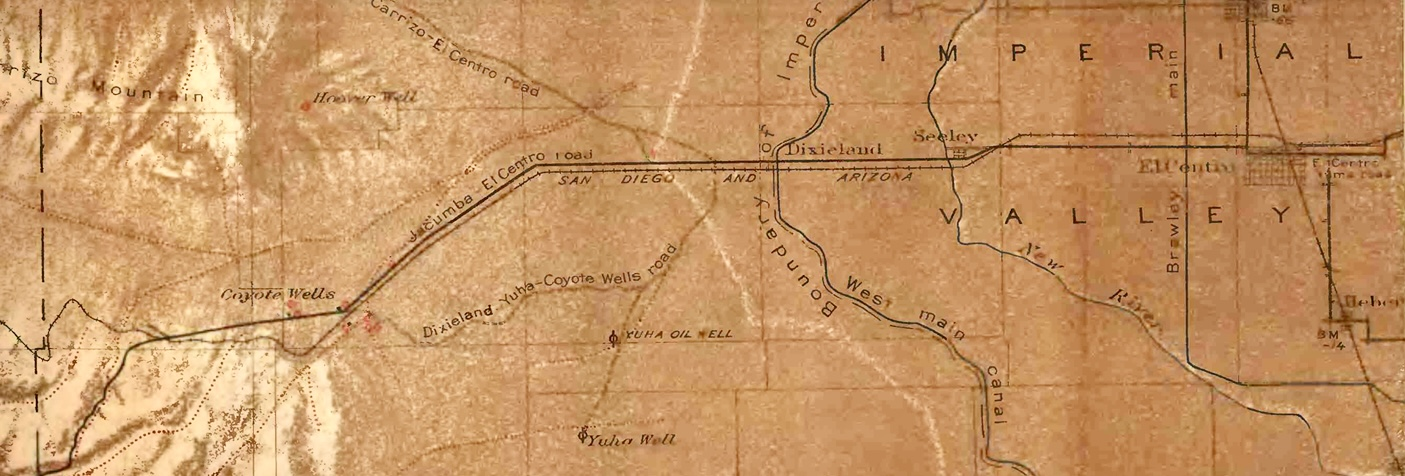
- Coyote Wells and environs, c. 1920

- Location in California
- Coordinates: 32°44′19″N 115°58′03″W
- Country: United States
- State: California
- County: Imperial County
- Elevation: 299 ft (91 m)

Population
  - Estimate (1998): 1,409

Coyote Wells is an unincorporated community in Imperial County, California. It is located on the San Diego and Arizona Eastern Railway 24 miles (39 km) west of El Centro, at an elevation of 299 feet (91 m).

There is a petrified forest in and around Yuha wash, about 10 miles (16 km) southwest of Coyote Wells.

== Coyote Wells Landing Fields ==
During World War II the US Navy built two airstrips at Coyote Wells to support NAS San Diego.

- North Coyote Wells Naval Outlying Landing Field also called Booming Naval Outlying Landing Field was a 2,600 feet runway. North Coyote Wells Naval Outlying Landing Field was 13 miles northeast of Coyote Wells. Just north of the airstrip was a bombing target. Landing Field was used as an Emergency Landing Field. Site was abandoned in 1949. No trace of airstrips remains.(32.93, −115.88)
- South Coyote Wells Naval Outlying Landing Field was 3 miles east of Coyote Wells built in 1938. The site had three 2,500 feet unpaved runways for Emergency Landing at an elevation of 300 feet. Site was sold in 1956. No trace of airstrips remains.(32.74, −115.96)

== See also ==
- California during World War II
