= Mountain Spring, San Diego County, California =

Locale in San Diego County, California

Coordinates: 32°40′25″N 116°06′31″W

Mountain Spring is a locale within Mountain Springs County Park in eastern San Diego County, California. It is located at an elevation of 2,431 feet (741 m). It is the site of Mountain Spring, now enclosed in a concrete walled pool where it emerges from the mountainside and its waters percolate down a vegetated arroyo toward a culvert that carries water under Interstate 8 toward Myer Creek, and the head of In-Ko-Pah Gorge.

== History ==
Mountain Spring was the water source of stages and freight wagons on the old road between San Diego and Yuma, Arizona from 1863. It was located midway between the section of road over Table Mountain and the section of that road where it climbed up Devils Canyon out of the Yuha Desert. In 1863, Pete Larkins and Joe Stancliff built a house at Mountain Spring, selling supplies to passing travelers and assisted travelers up the steep, thirty per cent mountain grade in the canyon below with a team of oxen.
