= In-Ko-Pah Mountains =

Mountain range in California, US

- Location within California

Highest point
- Peak: Mt. Tule
- Elevation: 1,416 m (4,646 ft)

Geography
- Country: United States
- State: California
- District: San Diego County
- Range coordinates: 32°48′0.197″N 116°17′3.061″W
- Topo map: USGS Sombrero Peak

The In-Ko-Pah Mountains are one of the Peninsular Ranges in Southern California near the Mexico–United States border, west of the Jacumba Mountains. The range, which lies in a north-south direction, is located just north of Interstate 8, and east of the Manzanita Indian Reservation.

The range is approximately 12 miles (19 km) long. Mt. Tule, at 4,647 feet (1,416 m), and Sombrero Peak, at 4,229 feet (1,289 m) above sea level, are the tallest mountains in the chain.

== Geology ==
The In-Ko-Pah Mountains consist of faulted granitic intrusive bedrock, weathered into dramatic piles of residual boulders. The local granodiorite is naturally a very light color, weathering over centuries into a reddish-orange desert varnish.

Visitors can view these landforms while driving Interstate 8 through Devil's Canyon heading west and In-Ko-Pah Gorge heading east. Remnants of Highway 80, the first North American transcontinental highway, can be seen on either side. The boulders can be examined closer at the Desert View Tower, a historic roadside structure, that includes a boulder park with a number of massive Depression-era sculptures carved in the local rocks.

Camping among the rocks is available in the McCain Valley Recreational Area, located off Interstate 8 near the town of Boulevard.

== See also ==
- Peninsular Ranges topics
