= Carpenter Summit =

Highway pass in southern California

- Location within southern California Location within California
- Elevation: East bound 4,052 feet (1,235 m); West bound at 4,078 feet (1,243 m)

Third Approach
- Location: San Diego County, California
- Range: Cuyamaca Mountains
- Coordinates: 32°49′8″N 116°34′48″W

Carpenter Summit is a highway pass name approved through the United States Geological Survey. This pass was created during the construction of I-8 from 1972 to 1974 in this area, but was never named unlike the freeway's three other 4,000-foot (1,200 m) passes in the area then named during construction. The name “Carpenter Summit” was proposed in late 2019; as of October 2020, it was pending the various levels of place name acceptance to recognize Richard L. "Dick" Carpenter, deceased.

This highway pass is the first of four which were completed through the Cuyamaca Mountains of southeastern San Diego County, California, and traversed by Interstate 8 altitudes of 4,052 feet (1,235 m) (eastbound) and 4,078 feet (1,243 m) (westbound). The freeway is divided at this location by an east–west ridge with a peak of 4,120 feet (1,260 m). This immediate area is referenced as "Carpenter Summit."

Of the four 4,000-foot (1,200 m) highway summits eastward of San Diego, the Carpenter Summit is the first. It is followed in order by Laguna Summit, Crestwood Summit, and Tecate Divide.

== Construction ==
The Interstate 8 route was realigned from Arnold Way onto Alpine Boulevard as it passed through Alpine and the Viejas Indian Reservation, before entering the Laguna Mountains and the Cleveland National Forest, mostly paralleling the alignment used by the old US 80.

By August 1970, the remainder of the freeway had been funded in this area, with the part from Japatul Valley Road to Laguna Junction costing $22 million (equivalent to $182,000,000 in 2025).

By the beginning of 1974, the new projected completion date for this I-8 section was mid-1975, with 22 miles (35 km) of two-lane highway remaining. The new Pine Valley Creek Bridge and the segment extending from Japatul Valley Road to Pine Valley was dedicated on November 24, 1974, and was scheduled to open on November 26; this left 8 miles (13 km) of freeway to be constructed. The final stretch of I-8 in California, from Sunrise Highway to La Posta Road, was completed in May 1975.
