= Powerlink =

Powerlink or Power Link may refer to:

- Ethernet Powerlink
- Great Belt Power Link
- Powerlink Queensland
- Sunrise Powerlink
