= Coyote Wash (California) =

Location
- Country: United States
- State: California
- Region: Imperial County

Physical characteristics
- Source: eastern slope of Jacumba Mountains
  - coordinates: 32°42′06″N 116°02′46″W
  - elevation: 1,830 ft (560 m)
- Mouth: terminus of the wash into the sands west of New River.
  - coordinates: 32°48′35″N 115°48′04″W
  - elevation: 0 ft (0 m)
- Length: 22 mi (35 km)
- Discharge
  - location: terminus of the wash into the sands west of New River

Basin features
- Tributaries
  - left: South Fork Coyote Wash
  - right: Palm Canyon Wash, Myer Creek

Coyote Wash, an arroyo, and ephemeral stream or wash running east from the Jacumba Mountains through Coyote Wells where it broadens into a wide sandy wash, takes in Myer Creek, South Fork Coyote Wash, Palm Canyon Wash and passes Sackett's Wells, then a point 1.5 miles the north of Plaster City, from which it flows toward the New River, where it sinks into the sands just below sea level, west of the river, in the Yuha Desert in Imperial County, California.

== History ==
Sackett's Wells a well on the route of the desert crossing of the Southern Emigrant Trail from the Colorado River Yuma Crossings to coastal Southern California was located on Coyote Wash. Sackett's Wells was the site of one of the later stagecoach stations of the 2nd Division of the Butterfield Overland Mail. It was established as a place to provide water and to hold a change of coach teams midway between the original stations in the desert regions of the route.
