= Boulder Park, California =

Unincorporated community in California, United States

- Unincorporated community
- Location in California Boulder Park, California (the United States)
- Coordinates: 32°39′32″N 116°06′03″W
- Country: United States
- State: California
- County: Imperial County
- Elevation: 2,923 ft (891 m)

Boulder Park is an unincorporated community in Imperial County, California. It lies at an elevation of 2923 feet (891 m) along Interstate 8. The Desert View Tower is located in Boulder Park.
