= South Fork Coyote Wash =

South Fork Coyote Wash is a 4 mile long tributary ephemeral stream or wash of Coyote Wash, in Imperial County, California. Its mouth is at its confluence with Coyote Wash at an elevation of 259 feet / 79 meters. Its source is found at 32°42′14″N 115°55′48″W, at an elevation of 362 feet in the Yuha Desert.
