= Mountain Springs County Park =

Park in California, United States

Coordinates: 32°40′29″N 116°06′30″W

Mountain Springs County Park is a park in San Diego County, California. It lies at an elevation of 2,434 feet / 742 meters. The park encloses the site of Mountain Spring, ruins of buildings, water troughs, corrals and some of the old roads over Table Mountain to Devils Canyon, that passed by the site.
