= Crestwood Summit =

Highway pass in southern California, USA

- Location within southern California Location within California
- Elevation: East bound 4,181 feet (1,274 m); West bound at 4,190 feet (1,280 m)

Third Approach
- Location: San Diego County, California
- Range: Cuyamaca Mountains
- Coordinates: 32°42′28″N 116°22′22″W

Crestwood Summit is a highway pass through the Cuyamaca Mountains of southeastern San Diego County, California, traversed by Interstate 8. Its elevation is 4,190 feet (1,280 m) westbound, and 4,181 feet (1,274 m) eastbound. It is the highest point on Interstate 8.

I-8 traverses four 4,000-foot (1,200 m) highway summits east of San Diego; from west to east, they are Carpenter Summit, Laguna Summit, Crestwood Summit, and Tecate Divide.

The highway summit was named after Crestwood Road, which runs north from Old Highway 80 and underneath I-8. It continues past the end of the county road into the reservation of the La Posta Band of Diegueno Mission Indians, which occupies the summit, and the band maintained the La Posta Casino at the summit until its closure in 2012. That casino has been replaced by the Golden Acorn Casino, supervised by the Campo Band of Diegueño Mission Indians, also known as the Campo Kumeyaay Nation, a federally recognized tribe of Kumeyaay people on the Campo Indian Reservation. By 1978, "the Campo people designated the area near the Crestwood freeway off-ramp as an area for economic development." Muht Hei, Inc. is the tribe's corporation.

== See also ==
- Interstate 8 at California Highways
- Interstate 8 at the Interstate Guide
- Interstate 8 in California and Arizona at AA Roads
- Google Street view of the I-8 summit area
