= Boulder Creek (Myer Creek tributary) =

Stream in California, United States

Boulder Creek is a 5-mile (8.0 km) long tributary stream of Myer Creek in Imperial County, California. It has its source at 32°37′39″N 116°05′59″W. The mouth of Boulder Creek is at its confluence with Myer Creek at an elevation of 1,775 feet (541 meters) in In-Ko-Pah Gorge.
