= Palm Canyon Wash =

Palm Canyon Wash may refer to:

- Palm Canyon Wash (Coyote Wash tributary), a stream in Imperial and San Diego Counties, California
- Palm Canyon Wash (Whitewater River tributary), a stream in Riverside County, California
