= Desert View Tower =

- U.S. National Register of Historic Places
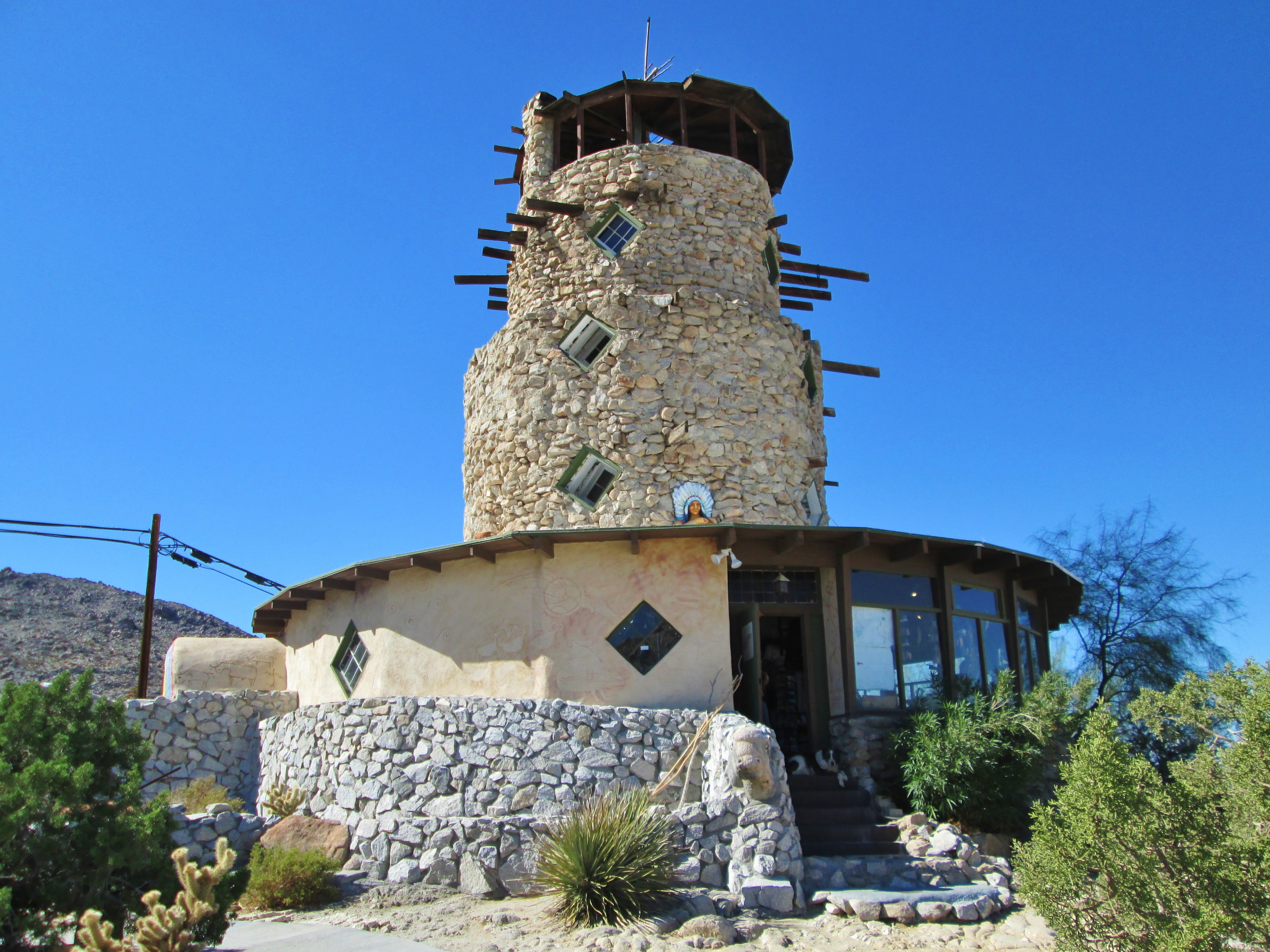

- Location within California Location within the United States
- Nearest city: Boulder Park, California
- Coordinates: 32°39′33″N 116°5′57″W
- Area: 5 acres (2.0 ha)
- Built: 1922–1928, 1930s, 1950
- Built by: Bert Vaughn, M.T. Ratcliffe
- Architectural style: Environmental Folk Art
- MPS: Twentieth Century Folk Art Environment in California TR
- NRHP reference No.: 80000801
- Added to NRHP: August 29, 1980

The Desert View Tower is located on Interstate 8, in Boulder Park, in western Imperial County, Southern California. It is also adjacent to remaining sections of Old U.S. Route 80. It is at 3,000 feet (910 m) in elevation, in the In-Ko-Pah Mountains.

Travel through this area has existed for centuries, and is documented in many of the nineteenth century newspapers of San Diego and elsewhere. Pioneers are known to have crossed here on trips between Yuma and San Diego. The first crossing in wheeled vehicles may have been the 1856 journey of Lt. E.B. Williston from San Diego, briefly through México, then up through Jacumba and on to Yuma. A historical plaque next to the tower marks the site of the Mountain Springs Station, a stone house used in 1862-1870 as a store from which ox teams pulled wagons up a 30% grade. Beginning in 1915, the Old Plank Road provided additional assistance for making the crossing in motorcars.

The stone tower was built over several years beginning in 1922 by Bert Vaughn, a San Diego real estate developer who owned Jacumba. Vaughn dedicated it to the pioneers, and highway and railroad builders who opened up the area. It also served as a roadside advertisement of a restaurant and bar located on the old road across from the tower. The five-story Tower houses a museum and has an observation deck on its upper level. The gift shop at the base of the Tower is a later addition.

An ensemble of sculptures of animals and other figures, called Boulder Park, is adjacent to Desert View Tower. They were sculpted in the local stone by Merle Ratcliff (spelling of his name varies across different sources) over two years during the 1930s while he was unemployed during the Great Depression. Both the tower and Boulder Park are works of folk art.

The tower and Boulder Park were listed on the National Register of Historic Places on August 29, 1980. As folk art, the tower and Boulder Park were included in the Twentieth Century Folk Art Environments in California Multiple Property Submission.
