= In-Ko-Pah Gorge =

Canyon in Imperial County, California

In-Ko-Pah Gorge is a deep, narrow canyon or gorge in San Diego and Imperial Counties, California, and was originally known as Myer Canyon. Its head is at 32°40′17″N 116°06′05″W at an elevation of 2,240 feet (680 m). Myer Creek flows down the In-Ko-Pah Gorge from its source in the Jacumba Mountains at the head of the canyon to its mouth at an elevation of 846 feet (258 m), then eastward to its mouth where it settles into the sands of the Yuha Desert, east of Ocotillo. Boulder Creek enters the canyon at its confluence with Myer Creek, a little over a mile (1.6 km) below the source of Myer Creek, at an elevation of 1,775 feet (541 m).

In-Ko-Pah Gorge carries the eastbound lanes of Interstate 8 through the In-Ko-Pah Mountains, while the westbound lanes use a different alignment through Devils Canyon. The road can be subject to closure in adverse weather conditions. During Hurricane Hilary in 2023, the highway closed due to a massive rockslide.
