= Laguna Summit =

- Location within southern California Location within California
- Elevation: 4,055 feet (1,236 m)

Third Approach
- Location: San Diego County, California
- Range: Cuyamaca Mountains
- Coordinates: 32°48′39″N 116°30′36″W

Laguna Summit is a highway pass through the Cuyamaca Mountains of southeastern San Diego County, California, traversed by Interstate 8 at an altitude of 4,055 feet (1,236 m).

Of the four 4,000-foot (1,200 m) highway summits eastward of San Diego, Laguna Summit is the second. The first highway summit is Carpenter Summit; the third and fourth are Crestwood Summit and Tecate Divide.

Laguna Summit is located east of Pine Valley, just to the east of the intersection with the Sunrise Highway (County Route S1), which heads north towards the Laguna Mountains. The pass is also traversed by Old Highway 80 at the junction of the Sunrise Highway, which continues as a frontage road of Interstate 8 on the south side of the freeway.

== Construction ==
The Interstate 8 route was realigned from Arnold Way onto Alpine Boulevard as it passed through Alpine and the Viejas Indian Reservation, before entering the Laguna Mountains and the Cleveland National Forest, mostly paralleling the alignment used by old US 80.

By August 1970, the remainder of the freeway had been funded, with the part from Japatul Valley Road to Laguna Junction costing $22 million (equivalent to $182,000,000 in 2025).

A portion of old US 80 that followed the grade eastward from Pine Valley up to the Sunrise Highway junction had to be closed for construction. A cutoff road (now named old US 80) direct from Pine Valley eastward to the Sunrise Highway (a route to Mt. Laguna) was made prior to freeway construction. Near the Laguna Junction was a roadhouse cafe of the same name for travelers that existed from 1916 until it was removed in 1971 to provide land for the I-8 interchange. The United States Geological Survey now cites "Laguna Junction" as a historical place name replaced by "Laguna Summit".

A section of old US 80—with the first few miles signed as SR 79—continues to serve as access to the communities of Descanso, Guatay, and Pine Valley; SR 79 intersected US 80 east of Descanso.

== See also ==
- Interstate 8 at California Highways
- Interstate 8 at the Interstate Guide
- Interstate 8 in California and Arizona at AA Roads
- Google Street view
