= Palm Canyon Wash (Coyote Wash tributary) =

River in California, United States

Palm Canyon Wash is an arroyo and tributary ephemeral stream or wash running east from the Jacumba Mountains in San Diego County, California to its confluence with Coyote Wash, east northeast of Ocotillo in the Yuha Desert of Imperial County, California at an elevation of 239 feet / 73 meters. Its source is on the east slope of the Jacumba Mountains at 32°42′28″N 116°10′10″W, at an elevation of 4,000 feet.
