= Sunrise Powerlink =

Location
- Country: United States
- State: California
- General direction: East-West
- From: 32.7200°N 115.7166°W
- To: 32.9171°N 117.0311°W

Ownership information
- Owner: San Diego Gas and Electric
- Partners: Pacific Gas and Electric, Southern California Edison
- Operator: San Diego Gas and Electric

Technical information
- Total length: 119 km (74 mi)

Sunrise Powerlink is a high-voltage power transmission line by San Diego Gas & Electric (SDG&E) in San Diego County, California and Imperial County, California. The project was approved by the United States Forest Service (USFS) in July 2010, the U.S. Bureau of Land Management (BLM) in January 2009 and the California Public Utilities Commission (CPUC) in December 2008. SDG&E stated that the 117-mile (188 km) long 230/500 kilovolt power line would bring 1000 megawatts of renewable energy from the Imperial Valley to San Diego County. The cost of the project was estimated to be $1.9 billion for construction. SDG&E, which was to receive a guaranteed profit of over $1.4 billion from the construction of the line, claimed that the power line was necessary to support future growth of the San Diego region, and its economic benefits to the region would measure on the order of $100 million per year. However, the project has been called one of the most controversial projects ever proposed.

Construction began in December 2010 and the line was energized in June 2012. In constructing the line, 30,000 helicopter flight hours were used.

== Construction ==
In June 2012, major construction activities on the Sunrise Powerlink Project were completed. The line was energized on June 17, following a prolonged testing and completion phase.

The overhead portion of the Sunrise Powerlink is proceeded on schedule with the construction of towers and tower foundations in Eastern San Diego County and Imperial County.

Work is also progressed on the new Suncrest Substation, which is a critical facility for the project. Upgrades to the existing San Luis Rey, Encina and Imperial Valley substations were also completed.

The underground portion of the line through Alpine also progressed with the installation of vaults under Alpine Boulevard. The vaults allow for the installation of the 230-kilovolt electrical cable and provide access for maintenance of the cable connections. Workers have also installed cable, which is fed into a manhole and "pulled" by a special machine through underground conduits.

The USFS issued a Record of Decision on July 13, 2010 that allows for a 19-mile (31 km) segment of the line to be built through the Cleveland National Forest.

The Interior Board of Land Appeals (IBLA) within the U.S. Department of the Interior issued a decision on May 14, 2010 rejecting the appeal filed by Backcountry Against Dumps (BAD) and other East County organizations. BAD sought to reverse the BLM's approval of the line.

"Because Backcountry has failed to establish any error of law or fact in the Record of Decision, we will affirm BLM's decision to approve the granting of Rights-of-Way to SDG&E for an electrical transmission line and related activity for the Sunrise Powerlink Transmission Project," the ruling stated.

The IBLA concluded that the BLM decision was consistent with the National Environmental Policy Act and the National Historic Preservation Act.

On December 9, 2010 ground was broken in Boulevard, California to mark the start of construction on the project's first tower. California Governor Arnold Schwarzenegger was at the ground breaking ceremony, along with several other local government leaders. During the ceremony, Schwarzenegger said the Sunrise Powerlink project should serve as an example to the nation of how to build green infrastructure. "We are well on our way to be an example for the rest of the nation, especially when it comes to infrastructure," Schwarzenegger said.

== Key Documents ==
Final Project Modification Report: On May 14, 2010, SDG&E submitted the Final Project Modification Report (PMR) to the CPUC and the BLM. The PMR fine-tunes the approved route and enhances the environmental preservation and protection components of the transmission line. These changes were made in order to minimize impacts to sensitive resources, accommodate landowners where possible and reduce engineering constraints. Highlights of the PMR include:

- More than 40 poles and structures eliminated
- Access roads reduced by 74 miles (119 km), or nearly 60 percent, through increased use of helicopters for construction and maintenance
- Permanent impacts to sensitive vegetation communities reduced by 235 acres (0.95 km^{2})
- Impacts to Quino Checkerspot Butterfly habitat reduced by a minimum of 58 percent
- Temporary impacts to Peninsular Bighorn Sheep habitat decreased by an average of 86 percent and permanent impacts decreased by an average of 74 percent
- Temporary and permanent impacts to U.S. and state waters reduced by 88 percent

Final Environmental Impact Report/Environmental Impact Statement: The Sunrise Powerlink Final Environmental Impact Report/Environmental Impact Statement was filed on October 13, 2008.

== Key Regulatory Findings ==
The project has generated much controversy since its conception, primarily due to questions concerning whether the line is necessary. However, it has been approved by all three major regulatory agencies that have jurisdiction over the project: the CPUC, BLM and USFS. In its final decision, the CPUC voted 4-1 on Dec. 18, 2008 to approve that the Sunrise Powerlink. Both the CPUC administrative law judge and the presiding commissioner assigned to the proceeding recommended against approval. The federal Bureau of Land Management approved the project on January 20, 2009.

== Renewable Energy ==
SDG&E has stated that the line is intended to carry renewable energy generated by the sun, wind and geothermal sources. In its 4-1 decision to approve the line, the CPUC stated that the Sunrise Powerlink will facilitate the development of Imperial Valley renewable energy projects capable of generating 1,900 megawatts of clean power. The decision further stated that this renewable energy would likely remain unavailable to San Diego without a new, secure transmission line. However, in a dissenting opinion, CPUC Commissioner Dian Grueneich stated that the application should be denied for the following reasons: (1) It is not needed to meet SDG&E's renewable portfolio standard (RPS)obligation of 20% by 2010;(2) Assuming a 20% RPS, it is not economic and will potentially generate significant ratepayer costs; (3) It will have many significant and unmitigable impacts on the environment; and (4) Other alternatives will meet SDG&E's eventual reliability needs more economically and with fewer significant and unmitigable impacts on the environment.

SDG&E is not legally obligated to carry any renewable energy on the line. In response to that concern, SDG&E President & CEO Debra Reed stated in testimony before the commission that the utility would make three voluntary commitments if Sunrise is approved. She stated that SDG&E would: (1) not contract, for any length of term, with conventional coal generators that deliver power via Sunrise, (2) replace any currently approved renewable energy contract deliverable via Sunrise that fails with a viable contract with a renewable generator located in Imperial Valley, and (3) voluntarily raise SDG&E's renewable energy goal to 33 percent by 2020. (SDG&E was the first investor-owned utility in California to make this commitment.)

According to the Renewable Energy Transmission Initiative, east San Diego County, along with neighboring Imperial County and Northern Baja California, has a potential aggregate generating capacity of roughly 6,870 megawatts (MW) for solar energy, 3,495 MW for wind power and 2,000 MW for geothermal energy. Together, these renewable resources could potentially produce enough electricity to power 8 million homes at noon, on a sunny day, if the wind was turning windfarm turbine rotors at their theoretical maximum speed. Given Southern California capacity factors, however, of 28% for solar and 30% for wind, production at the quoted capacity would average one-third of that, or enough to power 2,666,000 homes.

This will help meet several state and federal policies and mandates for the increased use of green energy, including:

- President Obama's New Energy for America Plan: This plan seeks to ensure that 25 percent of the country's electricity comes from renewable sources by 2025. Roughly $6.5 billion included in the American Recovery and Reinvestment Act is intended to provide tax relief and other incentives to develop the infrastructure necessary to move renewable energy from rural production areas to urban markets.
- California Renewables Portfolio Standard: This mandate requires utilities to provide at least 20 percent of their electricity from renewable sources by 2010. Governor Arnold Schwarzenegger has signed an executive order raising this threshold to 33 percent by 2020.
- California Global Warming Solutions Act of 2006 (AB 32): This requires the reduction of greenhouse gas (GHG) emissions to 1990 levels by 2020. A study by the University of San Diego identified increased use of renewable energy as the most effective means of reducing energy-related GHG emissions in the region.

== Public Involvement ==
Public involvement during the public participation period of the project is a source of significant controversy. Community groups state that SDG&E failed to notify the public about the southern route which was ultimately selected by the CPUC. SDG&E contends they performed all notifications as required by law, and that the project's environmental impact report included the southern route as one of the nine alternatives being considered. The CPUC later confirmed these statements.

However, during this same period, SDG&E testified before the CPUC that the southern route was not feasible. The media and public hearings therefore focused on the northern route through Anza Borrego State Park, and opponents of the project claimed there was no media or public focus on the possible southern routes. While the CPUC did not refute the claim that there was not media or public focus on the southern route, the CPUC has stated that the legally required notifications occurred. SDG&E was required to notify property owners within 300 feet (91 m) of the proposed route.

After the last public participation hearing held by the CPUC in February 2008, SDG&E notified the CPUC and that the southern route was feasible. In October 2008, the CPUC fined SDG&E over $1.1 million for misleading the CPUC about the feasibility of the southern route. However, there were no subsequent CPUC public participation hearings in San Diego for the residents along the southern route.

The CPUC approved the southern route in December 2008. After the approval of the route, SDG&E held workshops in communities along the route, where they were criticized by community members who stated that were just learning about this route for the first time. Those critical of the lack of notification included the Lakeside Planning Group. However, the CPUC provided proof that the Lakeside Planning Group received all documentation and notification, however, this notification occurred during the time in which SDG&E was stating in public testimony that the southern route was not feasible. The CPUC confirmed that no current members of the planning group provided comment.

The CPUC and SDG&E state that they have held numerous workshops and community meetings to gather input and feedback on the Sunrise Powerlink. Community groups contend that the community meetings were not held until after the project was approved. The Final Environmental Impact Report documents the public involvement process, which included public meetings throughout the approval process, although none of those meetings were held in the impacted community of Lakeside.

The most recent phase of the post-approval public involvement process is a series of Community Council meetings. SDG&E has created seven Community Councils along the route that give the public the opportunity to provide input and feedback on the permitting and construction of the Sunrise Powerlink. Members, who live and work in the communities they represent, are being encouraged to share what they learn with residents and businesses in their communities. Community Councils are being created in: Imperial Valley, Campo, Boulevard, Jacumba, Alpine, Lakeside and the City of San Diego.

SDG&E has been criticized for hand-picking community members to sit on the community councils.

== Support ==
The line is supported by the California Independent System Operator, which oversees the state's power grid; the California Energy Commission, the CPUC, the BLM, and the Community Alliance for the Sunrise Powerlink (CASP), a group of business leaders, individuals, government leaders and organizations that represent hundreds of thousands of people throughout California. CASP believes the region needs improved access to reliable, renewable energy to maintain the region's economic competitiveness and quality of life. Three entities founded CASP in partnership with SDG&E: BIOCOM, the Downtown San Diego Partnership and the San Diego-Imperial Counties Labor Council. Two more agencies have since become heavily involved in the group: The San Diego Regional Chamber of Commerce and the San Diego Regional Economic Development Corporation.

More than 75 elected officials support the Sunrise Powerlink, as do numerous business and labor organizations that represents tens of thousands of Californians.

== Opposition ==
The line is opposed by a diverse group of individuals, elected officials, community leaders and organizations. One elected official is San Diego County Supervisor Dianne Jacob, who is actively opposed to the route, and has testified before the CPUC in opposition to the project. The project is also opposed by a non-profit utilities watchdog group, the Utilities Consumer Action Network . UCAN, in a joint action with the Center for Biological Diversity, is challenging the CPUC's approval in the California Supreme Court. In addition, the project is also being litigated in federal court, by a coalition of three community groups; the Protect Our Communities Foundation , East County Community Action Coalition , and Back Country Against Dumps . These community groups are challenging the Bureau of Land Management's approval of the project on BLM land, on the grounds that the BLM failed to perform its legally required environmental reviews of the project.

One of the community groups in opposition to the project, the East County Community Action Coalition, was formed in March 2009 in response to the approval of the route through the east county of San Diego. The grass-roots organization states that in just one year, its membership has surged to include groups and individuals that together represent over 79,000 individuals. The coalition cites a variety of reasons for opposing the line, including the concern that the route will traverse some of the most fire prone areas of San Diego county, including the area that was burned in the 2003 Cedar Fire. The Cedar Fire is, to date, the deadliest fire in California's history, and ninth deadliest wildfire in U.S. history.

The CPUC, in its final decision, stated that lower-voltage distribution lines, not high-voltage transmission lines like the Sunrise Powerlink, were responsible for most power-line related fires in the San Diego area. Further, the CPUC instituted mitigation measures to further reduce the risk of fire.

== Environmental Impact Report ==
The 11,000 page Environmental Impact Report conducted by the California Public Utilities Commission favored no transmission line as its first alternative. Instead, the report recommended a mix of energy sources, including local solar generation. San Diego County is one of the sunniest counties in the country and is a favorable venue for rooftop solar voltaic generation, as pointed out in a comprehensive report discussing various energy options for the region [footnote Bill Powers' Smart Energy Solutions report ]. The project has also generated controversy concerning the choice of route. Rather than following roads (e.g. Interstate 8) or existing transmission lines, SDG&E originally proposed to build it in wilderness, cutting across Anza-Borrego Desert State Park and Cleveland National Forest. The route approved by the California Public Utilities Commission avoids Anza-Borrego Desert State Park, and instead traverses the Cleveland National Forest and the communities of Jacumba, Boulevard, Campo, Japatul Valley, Lyons Valley, Alpine, and Lakeside. The U.S. Forest Service is currently considering a proposed plan amendment and Record of Decision that would allow the line to cross a section of the Cleveland National Forest. The project can not be built without Forest Service approval. SDG&E has stated that the Sunrise Powerlink is expected to be in service by 2012.

The project's Environmental Impact Report "Fire and Fuels Management" section lists numerous unmitigable significant impacts; known as Class 1 impacts, which are the highest level of impact that a project can have. The final EIR states that, "San Diego County is an extremely fire-prone landscape. Winds originating from the Great Basin, locally known as Santa Anas, create extreme fire weather conditions characterized by low humidity, sustained high-speed winds, and extremely strong gusts. Santa Ana winds typically blow from the northeast over the Peninsular Range. As the air is forced through coastal mountain passes, wind speeds of 40 mph (64 km/h) can be maintained for hours with gusts from 70 to 115 mph (185 km/h) possible (Schroeder et al., 1964). Santa Ana winds create extremely dangerous fire conditions and have been the primary driver of most of California's catastrophic wildfires. Because of the presence of dense, dry fuels and periodic Santa Ana winds, southern California has been characterized as having one of the most fire-prone landscapes in the world.

The Final EIR cites the following unmitigable impacts:

Wildland firefighters working around energized power lines are exposed to electrical shock hazards including: direct contact with downed power lines, contact with electrically charged materials and equipment due to broken lines, contact with smoke that can conduct electricity between lines, and the use of solid-stream water applications around energized lines. Between 1980 and 1999 in the U.S., there were 10 firefighter fatalities due to electrical structure contact during wildfire suppression (NFPA, 2001). Maintaining a minimum 500-foot (150 m) safety buffer greatly reduces the risk of electrical structure contact, and it also reduces the effectiveness of ground-based frontal attacks.

The presence of the overhead transmission line would reduce the effectiveness of firefighting (Class I) - Aerial and ground-based firefighting efforts would be compromised by the introduction of an overhead transmission line due to the introduction of various hazards as identified in the Containment Conflict Model results, including increasing the risk of transmission line contact by aircraft or water buckets, creating indefensible landscapes, and obstructing historical fire containment boundaries.

The outcome of not fighting a wildfire in an otherwise defensible landscape under favorable weather conditions is that it is able to build in size and intensity unchecked by firefighters who are forced to wait until the fire passes through the area. Delays in containment allow for rapid fire perimeter growth. With the increase in the fire perimeter comes the potential for wind-blown embers to ignite spot fires ahead of the fire front, which further complicates fire suppression activities.

Impact F-2: Presence of the overhead transmission line would increase the probability of a wildfire (Class I)- The presence of the overhead transmission line would create an ongoing source of potential wildfire ignitions for the life of the project. Line faults can be caused by such unpredictable events as conductor contact by floating debris, gunshots, and helicopter collisions; these events are rare but would be unavoidable. Impact F-2 is considered a significant impact because certain ignition sources are unavoidable. Due to the potential for unavoidable ignitions related to the presence of the overhead transmission line to occur during extreme fire weather, the presence of the project would significantly increase the likelihood of a catastrophic wildfire (Class I). The risk of ignitions and the risk of damage from a project-related ignition can be reduced, though not to a level that is less than significant.

Impact F-3: Presence of the overhead transmission line would reduce the effectiveness of firefighting. (Class I)- Aerial and ground-based firefighting efforts would be compromised by the introduction of an overhead transmission line due to the introduction of various hazards as identified in the Containment Conflict Model results, including increasing the risk of transmission line contact by aircraft or water buckets, creating indefensible landscapes, and obstructing historical fire containment boundaries. The outcome of not fighting a wildfire in an otherwise defensible landscape under favorable weather conditions is that it is able to build in size and intensity unchecked by firefighters who are forced to wait until the fire passes through the area. Delays in containment allow for rapid fire perimeter growth. With the increase in the fire perimeter comes the potential for wind-blown embers to ignite spot fires ahead of the fire front, which further complicates fire suppression activities."

In addition, numerous environmental groups believe that construction of the power line, as well as the power line itself, will be harmful to the environment, will cost ratepayers more than better alternatives, and will actually add more greenhouse gases than it will save. The Draft Environmental Impact Report finds that several alternatives would be better for the environment than the Sunrise Powerlink.

However, the Environmental Impact Report itself is only one factor officials use in deciding the overall merits of a project. The Sunrise Powerlink EIR states that, "This EIR/EIS does not make a recommendation regarding the approval or denial of the project. It is purely informational in content, and will be used by the CPUC and BLM in considering whether to approve the Proposed Project or any of the alternatives analyzed in this EIR/EIS."
