= Tecate Divide =

- Location within southern California Location within California
- Elevation: 4,239 feet (1,292 m)

Third Approach
- Location: San Diego County, California
- Range: Cuyamaca Mountains
- Coordinates: 32°42′21″N 116°19′37″W

Tecate Divide is a mountain ridge in southeastern San Diego County, California, running in a north-south direction on the southeast fringe of the Cuyamaca Mountains. It reaches an altitude of 4,239 feet (1,292 m), and passes between the towns of Live Oak Springs to the west and Boulevard on its eastern slope.

The divide is crossed by Interstate 8 at an altitude of 4,140 feet (1,260 m).

Tecate Divide is also a highway summit on Interstate 8. It is the fourth 4,000-foot (1,200 m) highway summit eastward of San Diego through the Cuyamaca Mountains, following Carpenter Summit, Laguna Summit, and Crestwood Summit.

The name "Tecate" is used for several other place names in southeastern San Diego County and across the border in Mexico, most notably for the city of Tecate.
