= Dian Grueneich =

American scholar

Dian M. Grueneich (/ˈɡruːnɪk/ GROO-nik) is an American scholar and former public utilities commissioner. She served as a commissioner of the California Public Utilities Commission from 2005 until 2010. She is a senior research scholar at Stanford University's Precourt Institute for Energy.

== Biography ==
Grueneich earned a Juris Doctor from Georgetown University Law Center in 1977 and a Bachelor of Arts degree in Human Biology from Stanford University in 1974.

Grueneich was one of the five commissioners of the California Public Utilities Commission, which regulates utilities and common carriers in California. She was appointed to a six-year term by Governor Arnold Schwarzenegger in January 2005 and unanimously confirmed by the State Senate in May 2005.

As commissioner she oversaw the implementation of utility energy efficiency programs. She helped to develop incentives that reward energy utilities for energy efficiency efforts as part of climate change action plans for California. She pushed for consumer-friendly cell phone regulation and tried to force electrical companies to make more use of renewable energy sources.

Prior to her appointment with the CPUC, Grueneich served as a board member of the American Council for an Energy-Efficient Economy and is a past president of the California League of Conservation Voters. Since 2014, she has been a senior research scholar at Stanford University's Precourt Institute for Energy. She is also a senior fellow at New Buildings Institute.
