= Sweetwater River Bridge =

- Coordinates: 32.73316°N 116.94064°W
- Carries: Pedestrians
- Crosses: Sweetwater River
- Locale: Rancho San Diego, California

Characteristics
- Design: Truss
- Total length: 460 feet (140 m)
- Width: 22.5 feet (6.9 m)

History
- Constructed by: Pacific Iron and Steel Co.
- Opened: 1929

The Sweetwater River Bridge was built in 1929 to carry California State Route 94 over the Sweetwater River in San Diego County, California.
