= Campo Indian Reservation =

Indian reservation in California, United States

Campo Band of Diegueño Mission Indians of the Campo Indian Reservation
'Ellykaataay (Kumiai)
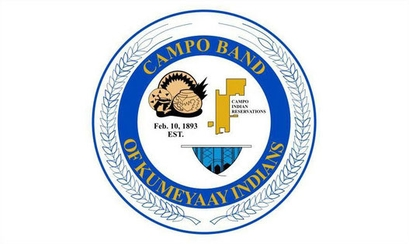

Total population
- 351 reservation residents

Regions with significant populations
- United States (California)

Languages
- Kumeyaay, Tipai English

Religion
- Traditional tribal religion, Christianity (Roman Catholicism)

Related ethnic groups
- other Kumeyaay people, Cocopa, Quechan, Paipai, and Kiliwa

Map of Campo Indian Reservation

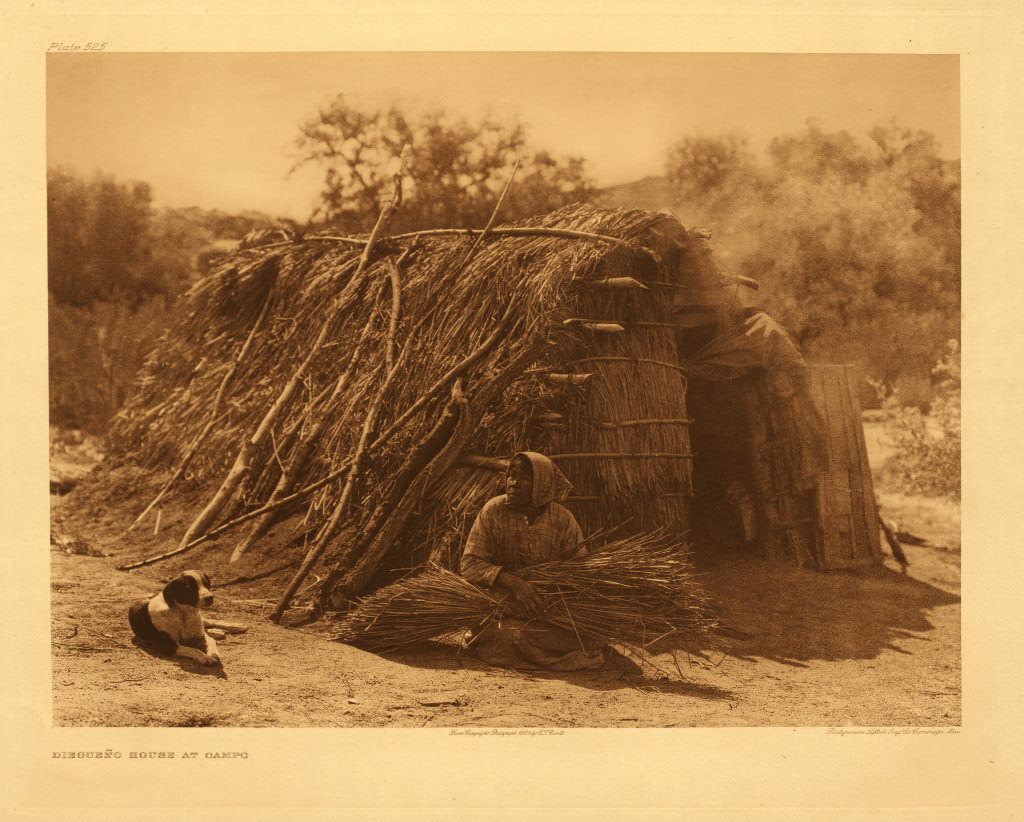
Kumeyaay woman in front of her traditional house at Campo, photo by Edward Curtis

The Campo Indian Reservation is home to the Campo Band of Diegueño Mission Indians, also known as the Campo Kumeyaay Nation (Kumiai: 'Ellykaataay), a federally recognized tribe of Kumeyaay people in the southern Laguna Mountains, in eastern San Diego County, California. The reservation was founded in 1893 and is 16,512 acres (66.82 km^{2}).

The reservation can be found "in the southeastern San Diego County atop the Laguna Mountains". Originally, the location was set on 710 acres in 1893. 80 acres were added in the winter of 1907, and another 13,610 acres were added in 1911. "All land on Campo is tribal-owned land; there are presently no allotments or assignments". The Campo Valley was known as Meelqsh G'tay (or big open meadow) in Kumeyaay language, and was known by its Hispanicized name as "Milguatay".

== History ==
Pre-Contact The sovereign land of the Kumeyaay Nation ranged from the Northern outskirts of modern San Diego county to the western borders of the imperial valley and the northern tip of Baja California, Mexico. There were many clans of the Kumeyaay nation, one being the Campo or Meelqsh G'tay. The multiple clans would join when in combat with neighboring threats.

Post-Contact The Campo and their neighboring clans resisted the Spanish missionaries and soldiers. Notably, the Mission Basilica San Diego de Alcala, founded in 1769, proved to be troubling for the tribe and many revolts broke out. "The most famous of these was the attack and destruction of the San Diego Mission in 1775".

After the Mexican Revolution, the new Mexican government enforced a secularization of the Mission system. Most of the Missions became ranches where most Indian tribes of the region were forced to labor. In response multiple Indian revolts and raids in the region brought destruction to many of the Ranchos. "By 1842, the Ranchos had been abandoned and the warriors were attacking the last stronghold, the City of San Diego", however the city was not destroyed.

The Mexican–American War intersects with the Kumeyaay when US forces made their way into San Diego. Although the Kumeyaay "offered allegiance", they were directed by US forces to stay out of the conflict. This interaction thus led to an agreed upon distinction of land in the Treaty of Santa Ysabel. However, this treaty was "voted down and placed under seal by the Senate of the United States".

Through a combination of military conflicts, raid suppression, and migration brought by the gold rush: "population of Indians in California dropped by 90% from 1850 to 1860". And soon after 1870, the land of the Kumeyaay would begin to be divided and set into sections, thus defining the later reservations. "Further additions were taken into trust over the next 25 years including the first portion of the Campo Indian Reservation in 1893".

Modern Era

In time the Treaty of Santa Ysabel, and many others of its kind, were revealed to have been kept in secrecy. In 1927, supporters of the Mission Indian Federation, a Riverside County organization in the support of Native rights, came in conflict with the Bureau of Indian Affairs "police resulting in shootings and deaths on the Campo Indian Reservation".

Later periods of the twentieth century proved to bring minor justices to the Campo Indian Reservation, including "1960s public assistance and food programs", the Self Determination Act of 1975, and by 1978, "the Campo people designated the area near the Crestwood freeway off-ramp as an area for economic development". Since then the tribe has developed a casino and built a wind farm.

== Government ==
The Campo Band is headquartered in Campo, California. They ratified their tribal constitution on July 13, 1975, which established a governing council consisting of all band members aged 18 or over. The democratically elected Executive Committee currently includes:

- Chairperson: Marcus W. Cuero
- Vice Chairperson: Benjamin Dyche
- Treasurer: Annah Ceballos
- Secretary: Ashley Jones
- Committee Member: Allonna Paipa
- Committee Member: Ronnie Lee Cuero
- Committee Member: Domingo Cuero III

== Services ==
In 1990, the Campo Band created the Campo Environmental Protection Agency (CEPA), which protects the environment and public health in the face of commercial development. The tribe also has the Campo Indian Education Center and Campo Tribal Training Program.

The Campo Kumeyaay Nation receives health services from the Southern Indian Health Council.

== Topography ==
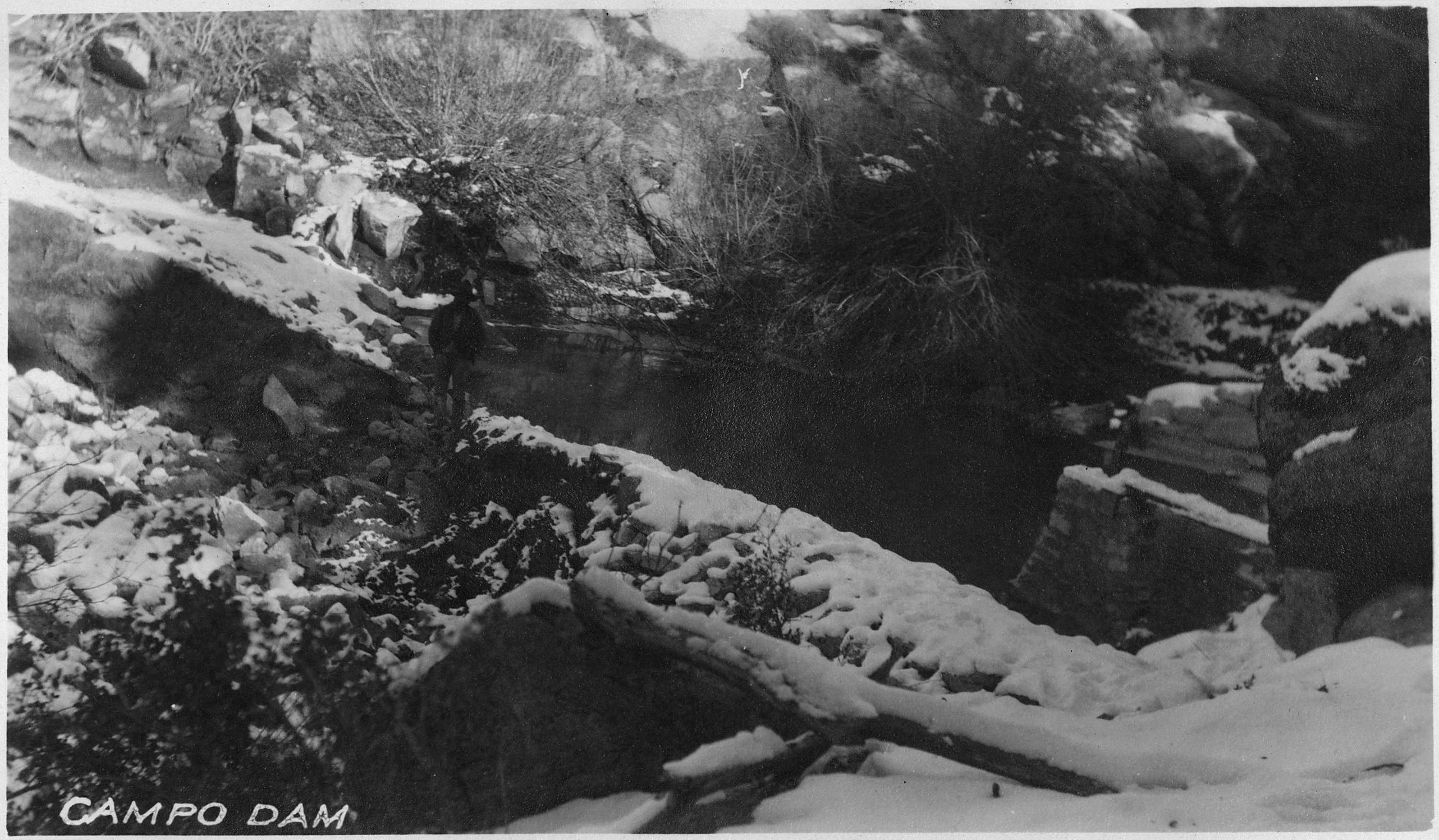
Campo Reservation Dam, ca. 1920

There are two areas included in the reservation, found on US Geological Survey feature ID 270242. The address for the tribal government is in the portion of the reservation north of Campo and Cameron Corners. This area is shown on the US Geological Survey Campo and Cameron Corners, California 7.5-minute quadrangles. While not a true square, this part of the reservation is roughly one mile across on each side. A point suitable for finding the reservation on a map is latitude/longitude.

A second, larger area of the Campo Indian Reservation is located to the east in the area around the community of Live Oak Springs. This area is shown on the US Geological Survey Live Oak Springs and Tierra del Sol, California 7.5-minute quadrangles. This portion is rectangular: about six miles (10 km) in the north–south dimension and about 3.2 miles (5.1 km) in the east–west dimension. Live Oak Springs is located at latitude/longitude 32°41′26″N 116°20′01″W. The south extent of the area is about 0.4 miles (0.64 km) north of the Mexican border.

== Economic development ==
Muht Hei, Inc. is the tribe's corporation, which oversees Golden Acorn Casino, Campo Materials, and Kumeyaay Wind, a wind farm with 25 Gamesa turbines. The tribe owns and operates the Golden Acorn Casino, the Golden Grill Restaurant, the Del Oro Deli, and a travel center, all located in Campo. The 50 MW wind farm produces an annual power supply to bring energy to "about 30,000 homes and saves approximately 110,000 tons a year in greenhouse gas emissions". An extreme wind event in 2009 surpassed the IEC limits and caused damage, and all blades had to be replaced. A 1,000-acre project with 48-60 larger turbines (4.2 MW each, between 202 and 252 MW combined) is planned for the area, connecting to the 500 kV Sunrise Powerlink. For nearly 200 days and nights of the year, average wind speed varies between 4 and 10 m/s, producing some power.

== Demographics ==
=== 2020 census ===
Campo Indian Reservation, California – Racial and ethnic composition Note: the US Census treats Hispanic/Latino as an ethnic category. This table excludes Latinos from the racial categories and assigns them to a separate category. Hispanics/Latinos may be of any race.
Race / Ethnicity (NH = Non-Hispanic)	Pop 2000	Pop 2010	Pop 2020	% 2000	% 2010	% 2020
White alone (NH)	68	40	63	19.37%	11.05%	15.83%
Black or African American alone (NH)	2	3	6	0.57%	0.83%	1.51%
Native American or Alaska Native alone (NH)	212	173	219	60.40%	47.79%	55.03%
Asian alone (NH)	0	0	0	0.00%	0.00%	0.00%
Native Hawaiian or Pacific Islander alone (NH)	0	0	0	0.00%	0.00%	0.00%
Other race alone (NH)	0	0	0	0.00%	0.00%	0.00%
Mixed race or Multiracial (NH)	11	39	26	3.13%	10.77%	6.53%
Hispanic or Latino (any race)	58	107	84	16.52%	29.56%	21.11%
Total	351	362	398	100.00%	100.00%	100.00%

== Internet ==
Portions of this remote area have wireless Ethernet Internet capability for tribe members. The service is provided through the Tribal Digital Village based on the Pala Indian Reservation, about 80 miles (130 km) north. This was reported in the San Diego Union Tribune, New York Times and on the Community Television of Southern California program, California Connected.

== Education ==
The reservation is served by the Mountain Empire Unified School District.

== See also ==
- Boulevard, California
- Mountain Empire, San Diego
- Kumeyaay Language

== Bibliography ==
- Eargle, Jr., Dolan H. California Indian Country: The Land and the People. San Francisco: Tree Company Press, 1992. ISBN 0-937401-20-X.
- Pritzker, Barry M. A Native American Encyclopedia: History, Culture, and Peoples. Oxford: Oxford University Press, 2000. ISBN 978-0-19-513877-1.
- Shipek, Florence C. "History of Southern California Mission Indians." Handbook of North American Indians. Volume ed. Heizer, Robert F. Washington, DC: Smithsonian Institution, 1978. 610–618. ISBN 0-87474-187-4.
