= Pine Valley, California =

- census-designated place
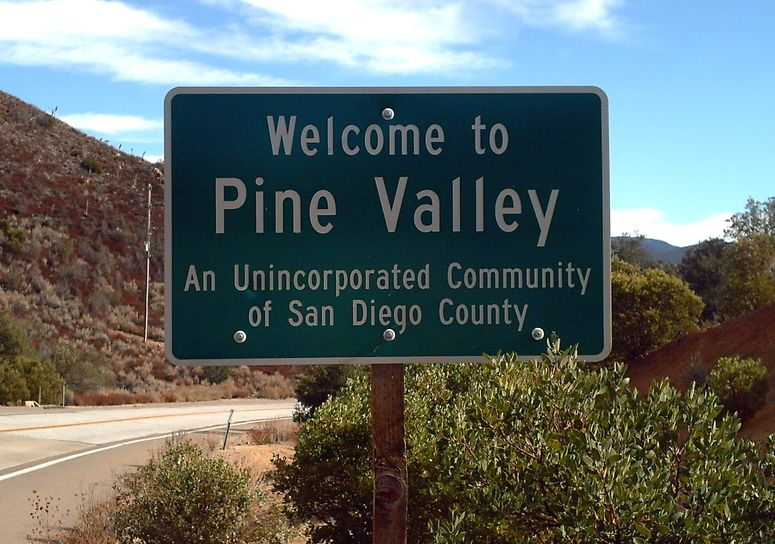
- "Welcome to Pine Valley" sign

- Location in San Diego County and the state of California

- Location within San Diego County Location within California Location within the United States
- Coordinates: 32°49′41″N 116°31′36″W
- Country: United States
- State: California
- County: San Diego

Area
  - Total: 7.165 sq mi (18.556 km^{2})
  - Land: 7.165 sq mi (18.556 km^{2})
  - Water: 0 sq mi (0 km^{2}) 0%
- Elevation: 3,737 ft (1,139 m)

Population (2020)
  - Total: 1,645
  - Density: 229.6/sq mi (88.65/km^{2})
- Time zone: UTC-8 (PST)
  - Summer (DST): UTC-7 (PDT)
- ZIP code: 91962
- Area code: 619
- FIPS code: 06-57260
- GNIS feature ID: 1652774

Pine Valley is a community and census-designated place (CDP) in the Cuyamaca Mountains of the Mountain Empire area, in southeastern San Diego County, California. The population was 1,645 at the 2020 census, up from 1,510 at the 2010 census.

== Geography ==
According to the United States Geological Survey, Pine Valley is located 3,736 feet (1,139 m) above sea level, at 32°49′17″N 116°31′45″W. Interstate 8 passes east-to-west along the southern border of Pine Valley. It crosses the Pine Valley Creek Bridge to the west of the town, and crosses Laguna Summit (altitude 4,055 feet (1,236 m)) just to the east of the town. The Sunrise Highway marks the eastern border of the town.

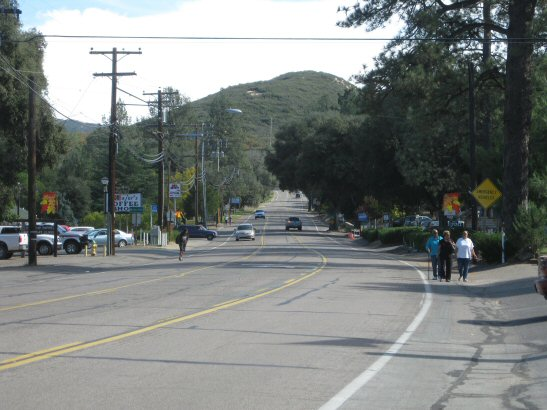
Downtown Pine Valley

According to the United States Census Bureau Pine Valley is located at 32°49′41″N 116°31′36″W (32.828184, -116.526583), which is near the center of the Pine Valley census-designated place (CDP). The Pine Valley CDP has a total area of 7.2 square miles (19 km^{2}), all land.

=== Climate ===
According to the Köppen Climate Classification system, Pine Valley has a warm-summer Mediterranean climate, abbreviated "Csb" on climate maps. The extreme high temperature is 110F, with the extreme low being −4F. Average annual precipitation is 23.66 inches (60.1 cm), mostly falling between November and March. Snow sometimes falls during winter storms, but usually melts rapidly.

Climate data for Pine Valley
Month	Jan	Feb	Mar	Apr	May	Jun	Jul	Aug	Sep	Oct	Nov	Dec	Year
Mean daily maximum °F (°C)	52 (11)	53 (12)	56 (13)	61 (16)	69 (21)	77 (25)	85 (29)	85 (29)	80 (27)	70 (21)	60 (16)	52 (11)	67 (19)
Mean daily minimum °F (°C)	29 (−2)	30 (−1)	32 (0)	35 (2)	40 (4)	47 (8)	54 (12)	53 (12)	47 (8)	38 (3)	32 (0)	27 (−3)	39 (4)
Average precipitation inches (mm)	5.54 (141)	6.77 (172)	5.77 (147)	2.67 (68)	.71 (18)	0.2 (5.1)	0.41 (10)	0.82 (21)	0.74 (19)	1.88 (48)	3.26 (83)	4.89 (124)	23.66 (601)

== Demographics ==
Historical population
Census	Pop.	Note	%±
1990	1,297		—
2000	1,501		15.7%
2010	1,510		0.6%
2020	1,645		8.9%
U.S. Decennial Census; 1860–1870 1880-1890; 1900 1910 1920; 1930 1940 1950; 1960 1970 1980; 1990 2000 2010; 2020

Pine Valley first appeared as a census designated place in the 1990 U.S. census.

=== Racial and ethnic composition ===
Pine Valley CDP, California – Racial and ethnic composition Note: the US Census treats Hispanic/Latino as an ethnic category. This table excludes Latinos from the racial categories and assigns them to a separate category. Hispanics/Latinos may be of any race.
Race / Ethnicity (NH = Non-Hispanic)	Pop 2000	Pop 2010	Pop 2020	% 2000	% 2010	% 2020
White alone (NH)	1,360	1,291	1,267	90.61%	85.50%	77.02%
Black or African American alone (NH)	0	6	10	0.00%	0.40%	0.61%
Native American or Alaska Native alone (NH)	10	3	6	0.67%	0.20%	0.36%
Asian alone (NH)	7	15	21	0.47%	0.99%	1.28%
Native Hawaiian or Pacific Islander alone (NH)	0	1	0	0.00%	0.07%	0.00%
Other race alone (NH)	1	4	16	0.07%	0.26%	0.97%
Mixed race or Multiracial (NH)	16	36	90	1.07%	2.38%	5.47%
Hispanic or Latino (any race)	107	154	235	7.13%	10.20%	14.29%
Total	1,501	1,510	1,645	100.00%	100.00%	100.00%

=== 2020 census ===
As of the 2020 census, Pine Valley had a population of 1,645 and a population density of 229.6 inhabitants per square mile (88.6/km^{2}).

The whole population lived in households. There were 644 households, out of which 184 (28.6%) had children under the age of 18 living in them, 406 (63.0%) were married-couple households, 34 (5.3%) were cohabiting couple households, 116 (18.0%) had a female householder with no spouse or partner present, and 88 (13.7%) had a male householder with no spouse or partner present. About 21.0% of all households were made up of individuals, and 12.3% had someone living alone who was 65 years of age or older. The average household size was 2.55. There were 467 families (72.5% of all households).

The age distribution was 332 people (20.2%) under the age of 18, 93 people (5.7%) aged 18 to 24, 344 people (20.9%) aged 25 to 44, 479 people (29.1%) aged 45 to 64, and 397 people (24.1%) who were 65 years of age or older. The median age was 47.9 years. For every 100 females, there were 100.9 males, and for every 100 females age 18 and over, there were 98.3 males age 18 and over.

There were 717 housing units at an average density of 100.1 units per square mile (38.6 units/km^{2}). Of the housing units, 89.8% were occupied and 10.2% were vacant. Of occupied units, 82.5% were owner-occupied and 17.5% were occupied by renters. The homeowner vacancy rate was 1.1% and the rental vacancy rate was 7.4%.

0.0% of residents lived in urban areas, while 100.0% lived in rural areas.

=== 2010 census ===
At the 2010 census Pine Valley had a population of 1,510. The population density was 211.3 inhabitants per square mile (81.6/km^{2}). The racial makeup of Pine Valley was 1,408 (93.2%) White, 6 (0.4%) African American, 6 (0.4%) Native American, 16 (1.1%) Asian, 1 (0.1%) Pacific Islander, 20 (1.3%) from other races, and 53 (3.5%) from two or more races. Hispanic or Latino of any race were 154 people (10.2%).

The whole population lived in households, no one lived in non-institutionalized group quarters and no one was institutionalized.

There were 610 households, 162 (26.6%) had children under the age of 18 living in them, 367 (60.2%) were opposite-sex married couples living together, 43 (7.0%) had a female householder with no husband present, 30 (4.9%) had a male householder with no wife present. There were 137 (30.1%) unmarried opposite-sex partnerships, and 6 (1.0%) same-sex married couples or partnerships. 128 households (21.0%) were one person and 49 (8.0%) had someone living alone who was 65 or older. The average household size was 2.48. There were 440 families (72.1% of households); the average family size was 2.85.

The age distribution was 279 people (18.5%) under the age of 18, 114 people (7.5%) aged 18 to 24, 284 people (18.8%) aged 25 to 44, 630 people (41.7%) aged 45 to 64, and 203 people (13.4%) who were 65 or older. The median age was 48.3 years. For every 100 females, there were 100.3 males. For every 100 females age 18 and over, there were 98.2 males.

There were 721 housing units at an average density of 100.9 per square mile, of the occupied units 498 (81.6%) were owner-occupied and 112 (18.4%) were rented. The homeowner vacancy rate was 1.4%; the rental vacancy rate was 5.9%. 1,217 people (80.6% of the population) lived in owner-occupied housing units and 293 people (19.4%) lived in rental housing units.

=== Income and poverty ===
In 2023, the US Census Bureau estimated that the median household income was $124,722, and the per capita income was $48,837. About 0.0% of families and 1.0% of the population were below the poverty line.

== Politics ==
In the state legislature, Pine Valley is located in the 40th senatorial district, represented by Republican Brian Jones, and in the 75th Assembly district, represented by Republican Carl DeMaio.

In the United States House of Representatives, Pine Valley is in California's 48th congressional district, represented by Republican Darrell Issa.

== Transportation ==
San Diego MTS route 888 provides service on Mondays and Fridays between El Cajon, Pine Valley, and Jacumba Hot Springs.
