= Pine Valley Creek Bridge =

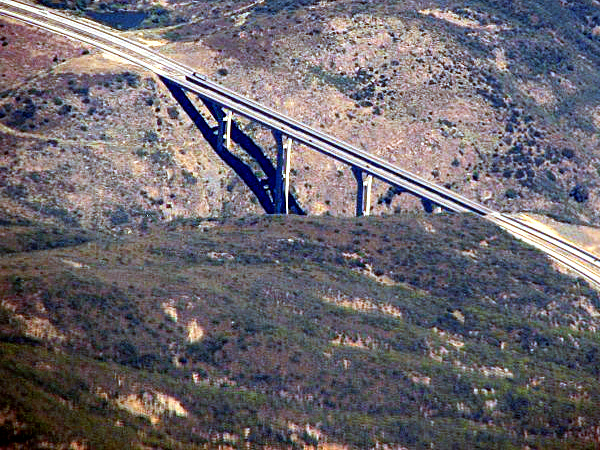
- Aerial view from a commercial jet
- Coordinates: 32°49′23″N 116°33′36″W
- Carries: I-8
- Locale: San Diego County, California
- Official name: Nello Irwin Greer Memorial Bridge
- Named for: Nello Irwin Greer
- ID number: 57 0692

Characteristics
- Material: Reinforced concrete
- Height: 450 ft
- Longest span: 1,691 ft
- No. of spans: 2

History
- Opened: 1974

The Pine Valley Creek Bridge, officially named the Nello Irwin Greer Memorial Bridge, is a reinforced concrete box girder bridge in San Diego County, California, near the town of Pine Valley. The bridge was built in 1974 as part of the Interstate 8 (I-8) freeway system. At the time of its construction, it was the first bridge constructed in the United States using the segmental balanced cantilever method.

The northern span is 1,691 ft (515.4 m) long while the southern span is 1,741 ft (530.7 m) long. The two spans rise 450 ft (137.2 m) above the valley floor, placing Pine Valley Creek Bridge among the highest bridges in the United States.

Originally known unofficially as the Pine Valley Creek Bridge, a California State Senate concurrent resolution (SCR-33) officially named the bridge in honor of the project engineer, Nello Irwin Greer, responsible for designing the section of I-8 known as the "Pine Valley Project".

In the original design, the freeway's routing followed the old U.S. Route 80 (US 80) path through the center of the town of Pine Valley. This would have destroyed much of the town and many of the native pines found there. Greer's design re-routed the freeway to the south through Pine Valley Creek Canyon, bypassing and preserving the quaint beauty of this eastern San Diego County mountain community. This new design also saved 2 miles (3.2 km) of freeway construction, saving millions of dollars in costs.

== See also ==
- List of bridges in the United States by height
