= Myer Creek (Coyote Wash tributary) =

River in California, United States

Myer Creek is a tributary ephemeral stream running east through the In-Ko-Pah Gorge in the Jacumba Mountains, then as a wash in the Yuha Desert, to Coyote Wash in Imperial County, California. Its mouth is located at an elevation of 446 feet / 136 meters where it usually sinks into the sands before reaching Coyote Wash near Ocotillo, California. Its source is near Mountain Spring at 32°40′17″N 116°06′05″W at an elevation of 2,240 feet at the head of In-Ko-Pah Gorge in the Jacumba Mountains.
