= Devils Canyon (Jacumba Mountains) =

Canyon in Imperial County, California

Devils Canyon is a steep canyon in the Jacumba Mountains in Imperial and San Diego Counties, California, United States. Its mouth is at an elevation of 1,109 feet (338 m) in Imperial County. Its head is at an elevation of 3,560 feet (1,090 m) at 32°41′06″N 116°08′42″W in the Jacumba Mountains in San Diego County.

== History ==
From 1862, Devils Canyon was the route of a wagon road between San Diego and Yuma, Arizona. The canyon later became the route of the westbound lanes of Interstate 8 that pass up the canyon to Mountain Spring. The eastbound lanes use a different alignment through the In-Ko-Pah Gorge.
