= Interstate 8 =

Interstate Highway in California and Arizona

Interstate 8
- I-8 highlighted in red

Route information
- Maintained by Caltrans and ADOT
- Length: 350.34 mi (563.82 km) 171.98 miles (276.77 km) in California; 178.36 miles (287.04 km) in Arizona
- Existed: August 14, 1957–present
- NHS: Entire route

Major junctions
- West end: Sunset Cliffs Boulevard / Nimitz Boulevard in San Diego, California
- I-5 in San Diego; SR 163 in San Diego; I-805 in San Diego; I-15 / SR 15 in San Diego; SR 125 in La Mesa, California; SR 67 in El Cajon, California; SR 111 in El Centro, California; US 95 in Yuma, Arizona; SR 85 in Gila Bend, Arizona
- East end: I-10 in Casa Grande, Arizona

Location
- Country: United States
- States: California, Arizona
- Counties: California: San Diego, Imperial; Arizona: Yuma, Maricopa, Pinal

Highway system
- Interstate Highway System; Main; Auxiliary; Suffixed; Business; Future
- State highways in California; Interstate; US; State; Scenic; History; Pre‑1964; Unconstructed; Deleted; Freeways
- Arizona State Highway System; Interstate; US; State; Scenic Proposed; Former
← SR 7	California	→ SR 9
← SR 989	Arizona	→ I-10

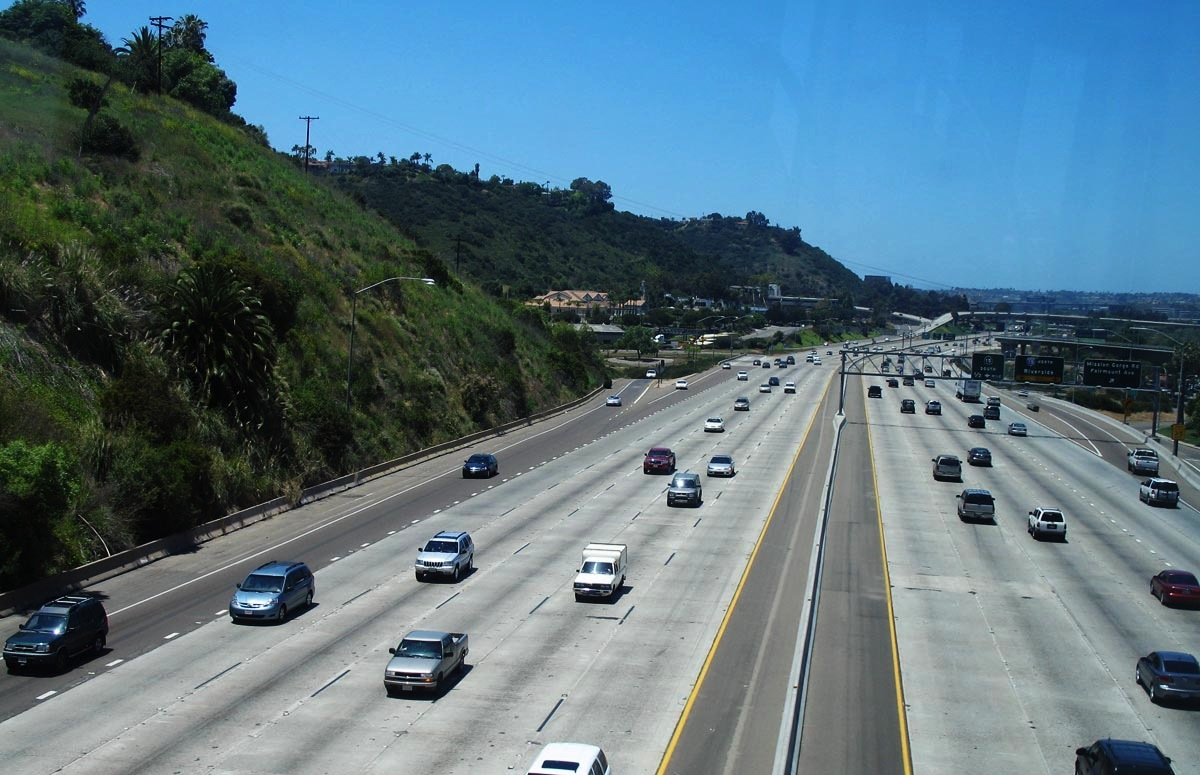
I-8 in San Diego, from the San Diego Trolley

Interstate 8 (I-8) is an Interstate Highway in the southwestern United States. It runs from the southern edge of Mission Bay at Sunset Cliffs Boulevard in San Diego, California, almost at the Pacific Ocean, to the junction with I-10, just southeast of Casa Grande, Arizona. In California, the freeway travels through the San Diego metropolitan area as the Ocean Beach Freeway and the Mission Valley Freeway before traversing the Cuyamaca Mountains and providing access through the Imperial Valley, including the city of El Centro. Crossing the Colorado River into Arizona, I-8 continues through the city of Yuma across the Sonoran Desert to Casa Grande, in between the cities of Phoenix and Tucson.

The first route over the Cuyamaca Mountains was dedicated in 1912, and a plank road served as the first road across the Imperial Valley to Yuma; east of there, the Gila Trail continued east to Gila Bend. These were later replaced by U.S. Route 80 (US 80) across California and part of Arizona, and Arizona State Route 84 (SR 84) between Gila Bend and Casa Grande. The US 80 freeway through San Diego was largely complete by the time it was renumbered as I-8 in the 1964 state highway renumbering; east of San Diego, the US 80 roadway was slowly replaced by I-8 as construction progressed in the Imperial Valley. The Arizona portion of the road was built starting in the 1960s. Several controversies erupted during the construction process; questionable labor practices in Imperial County led to the federal conviction of mobster Jimmy Fratianno, and a U.S. House of Representatives subcommittee found that the Arizona government had mismanaged financial resources.

The route was completed in 1975 through California, and by 1977 through Arizona, though the bridge over the Colorado River was not completed until 1978. Since then, the freeway through San Diego has been widened due to increasing congestion, and another portion in Imperial County had to be rebuilt following damage by the remnants of Hurricane Kathleen in 1976.

== Route description ==
I-8 is part of the National Highway System, a network of highways that are considered essential to the country's economy, defense, and mobility by the Federal Highway Administration. The freeway from the eastern junction with California State Route 98 (SR 98) to the eastern end is designated as part of the Juan Bautista de Anza National Historic Trail auto tour route, promoted by the National Park Service.

=== San Diego to Arizona border ===
The entirety of Interstate 8 in California is defined in section 308 of the California Streets and Highways Code as Route 8:

Route 8 is from:
(a) Sunset Cliffs Boulevard to Route 5 in San Diego
(b) Route 5 in San Diego to Yuma via El Centro.

The section of Route 8 defined in subdivision (a) is not considered an Interstate Highway according to the Federal Highway Administration (FHWA)'s route logs, but is still signed as an Interstate by Caltrans.

The freeway begins at the intersection of Sunset Cliffs Boulevard and Nimitz Boulevard in San Diego. For its first few miles, it parallels the San Diego River floodway. Near Old Town San Diego, I-8 intersects with I-5 as well as with Rosecrans Street, the former routing of SR 209.

As the freeway enters Mission Valley, it continues eastward, bisecting the area known as "Hotel Circle" that has several hotels. I-8 then has interchanges with SR 163, I-805, and I-15. In La Mesa, the route intersects SR 125, and in El Cajon it intersects with SR 67. From Mission Valley through El Cajon, it is paralleled by the San Diego Trolley Green Line.

East of El Cajon, it ascends into the mountains and the Cleveland National Forest, traveling through towns such as Alpine then going by the Viejas Casino before reaching Pine Valley. This route crosses four 4,000-foot (1219.2 meters) high points at Carpenter Summit, the Laguna Summit, followed by the Crestwood Summit, then the Tecate Divide. In between Carpenter and Laguna summits, it crosses the Pine Valley Creek Bridge. After the Laguna Summit, the road passes a U.S. border patrol interior checkpoint that was constructed in 1995 near Buckman Springs Road turnoff just east of the summit. However, this resulted in smugglers driving the wrong way on I-8 at high speeds in order to avoid the checkpoint, causing several crashes, even after concrete barriers were installed. The freeway intersects with SR 79 in the national forest before passing through the La Posta and Campo Indian reservations.

In Boulevard, I-8 has an interchange with the eastern end of SR 94.

I-8 straddles the San Diego–Imperial county line for a few miles before turning east. At the Mountain Springs/In-Ko-Pah grade, the freeway is routed down two separate canyons—Devils Canyon for westbound traffic and In-Ko-Pah Gorge for eastbound traffic—as it descends 3,000 ft (910 m) in 11 mi (18 km). In places, the median is over 1.5 mi (2.4 km) wide. This portion of the road is known for high winds through the canyons that have made driving difficult, sometimes resulting in closure of the freeway; in 1966, the California Highway Patrol estimated that winds blew at speeds of up to 100 mph (160 km/h). The route enters the Imperial Valley, where it intersects with SR 98, a highway leading to Calexico, and passes near the Desert View Tower. I-8 then goes through Ocotillo and Coyote Wells before entering the city of El Centro several miles later.

In El Centro, I-8 intersects with SR 86 and SR 111, both north–south routes which connect to I-10 in the Coachella Valley, north of the Salton Sea. SR 115 and SR 98 end at I-8 east of El Centro. The route also has the lowest dry-land elevation of any Interstate at 52 ft (16 m) below sea level near El Centro. The freeway then traverses the Imperial Sand Dunes Recreation Area and intersects with SR 186 leading south to Baja California, Mexico. I-8 runs parallel to the All-American Canal across the desert for roughly 55 mi (89 km). At points in eastern Imperial County, the Mexican border is less than 0.5 mi (0.80 km) south of the Interstate. I-8 then passes through Felicity and Winterhaven before crossing the Colorado River on a bridge into Yuma, Arizona.

I-8 is part of the California Freeway and Expressway System and is eligible for the State Scenic Highway System from I-5 to the western junction of SR 98, though it is not an official state scenic highway. It is officially known as the Border Friendship Route from San Diego to the Arizona state line. The Interstate is signed as the Ocean Beach Freeway west of I-5. For the entire length within San Diego County and into Imperial County, it is signed as the Kumeyaay Highway, after the local Native American tribe and their traditional trade route which the Interstate follows. Between Old Town and El Cajon, I-8 is called the Mission Valley Freeway. In 2014, I-8 had an annual average daily traffic (AADT) of 11,800 vehicles between Bonds Corner Road and SR 115, as well as between SR 98 and Imperial Highway, and 239,000 vehicles between I-805 and I-15, the latter of which was the highest AADT for the highway in California.

=== Yuma to Casa Grande ===
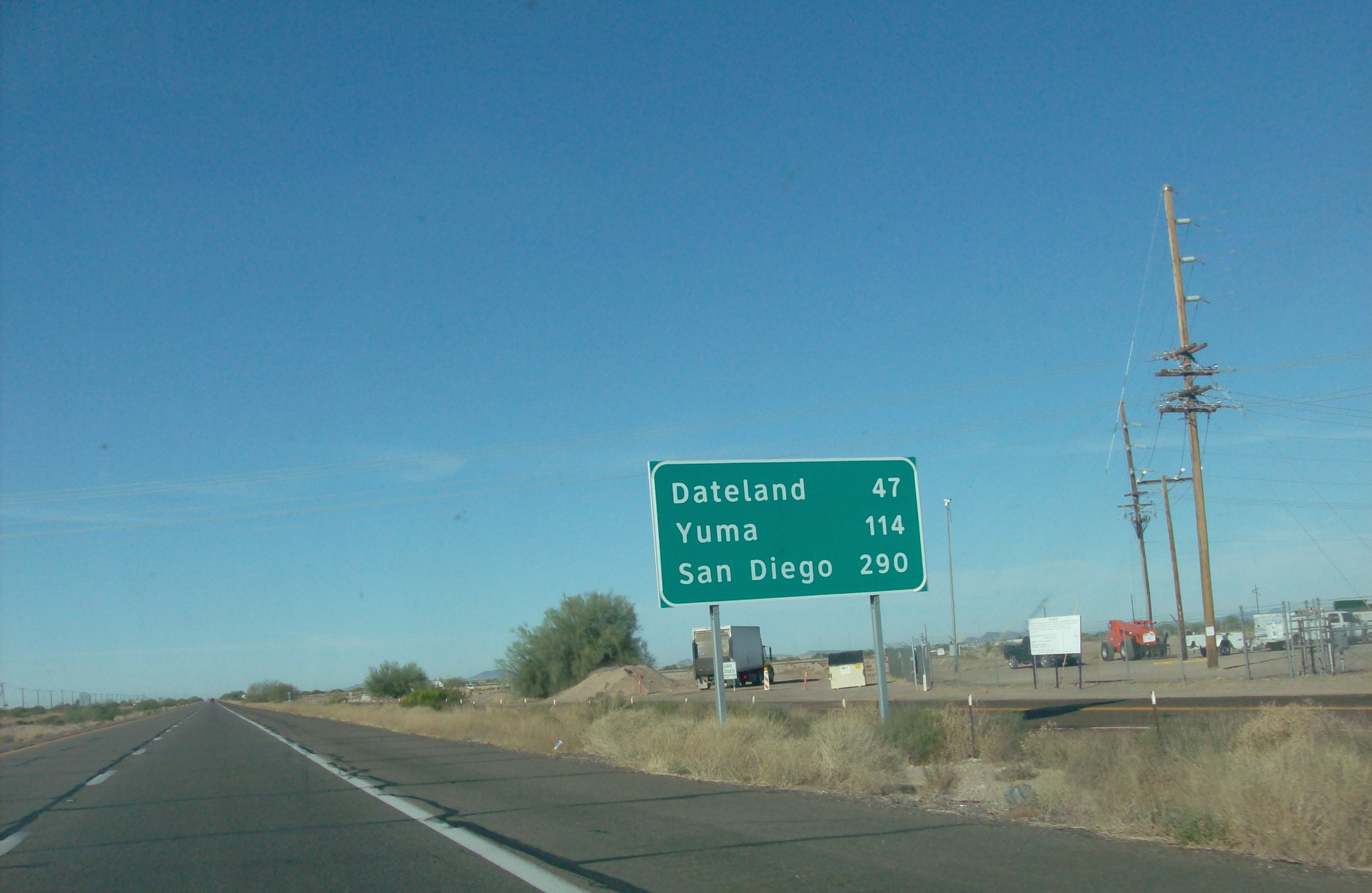
A sign displaying the mileages on I-8 westbound in Gila Bend

I-8 enters Arizona from California at the Colorado River bridge at Yuma. It initially heads south through Yuma until the interchange with US 95, where the freeway begins to turn to the east and passes through eastern Yuma and Fortuna Foothills, briefly paralleling US 95 and passing through a second border inspection station. In the Gila Mountains, the eastbound lanes of I-8 cross under the westbound freeway, briefly crossing over to the left near Telegraph Pass before reverting to the standard configuration. The Telegraph Pass is a highway pass about 19 miles (31 km) east of Yuma in the northwest Sonoran Desert.

West of Wellton, the highway takes a northeasterly course, paralleling the Gila River and passing to the south of Roll. Through this part of Arizona, I-8 passes along the northern edge of the Barry M. Goldwater Air Force Range and to the south of the Yuma Proving Ground. It keeps a northeastern heading, passing through the community of Dateland, until it reaches Gila Bend. There, the freeway intersects SR 85 heading north to Phoenix and south to the Organ Pipe Cactus National Monument.

After leaving Gila Bend, I-8 takes a southeastern course as it passes through the Sonoran Desert National Monument. Exiting the national monument grounds, the highway continues on an easterly bearing to a junction with SR 84, a highway that parallels I-8 to the north and goes through Casa Grande, while I-8 passes to the south of both Stanfield and Casa Grande. I-8 reaches its eastern terminus southeast of Casa Grande Mountain Park at an interchange with I-10, which continues north (westbound) to Phoenix, and south (eastbound) to Tucson.

The combination of SR 85 between I-10 and I-8 together with I-8 between SR 85 and I-10 has been promoted as a bypass of the Phoenix area for long-distance travelers on I-10. In 2014, I-8 had an AADT of 5,200 vehicles between Butterfield Trail and Freeman Road, and 44,400 vehicles between SR 280 and Araby Road east of Yuma, the latter of which was the highest AADT for the highway in Arizona. In the early 2010s, I-8 from Casa Grande to Gila Bend was sometimes used for smuggling both drugs and humans.

== History ==
The I-8 designation was accepted as a chargeable Interstate by the American Association of State Highway Officials in 1957, and was added to the state highway system in 1964 by the California State Legislature; the US 80 designation was removed at that time.

=== San Diego area ===
The freeway that would become I-8 was constructed in the mid-20th century through the San Diego area. The section west of I-5 was originally part of SR 109, and was added to I-8 in 1972. In later years, the California Department of Transportation (Caltrans) made efforts to widen the freeway as congestion increased.

==== Initial construction ====
Much of Alvarado Canyon Road from San Diego to La Mesa was originally built between 1947 and 1950, a bypass of the old US 80 routing along El Cajon Boulevard and La Mesa Boulevard. Work began to convert the original US 80 divided highway into a freeway in 1960, and the freeway was complete west of El Cajon by April 1962. Priority was given to planning US 80 improvements in 1962 by the California Chamber of Commerce. In 1964, I-8 was officially designated by the California State Legislature, and the US 80 designation was removed. By 1965, I-8 from Fairmount Avenue to El Cajon Boulevard was one of the first freeway stretches in the county to have a center barrier installed in the median.

The Ocean Beach Freeway section west of I-5 was authorized as Route 286 in 1959. In 1962, four alternate routes were proposed for this part of the freeway, and for Rosecrans Street. Route 286 was renumbered to SR 109 in the 1964 renumbering. Plans for the Old Town interchange between I-5 (formerly US 101), I-8 (formerly US 80), SR 209 (Rosecrans Street), and SR 109 date from 1962, although several concerns had to be taken into account, including the preservation of historical Old Town and keeping traffic through the area moving during construction. The goal was to begin the process in 1966, and complete the interchange in 1969. There were concerns about a $3 million shortfall in funding (about $22 million in 2024 dollars) during May 1966, which caused the San Diego Chamber of Commerce Highway Committee to recommend the completion of SR 109 as a project. This was projected to be the final highway project before I-5 was completed in San Diego County.

The building phase started on September 22, 1966, on the interchange that was to replace the intersection of Pacific Highway and Rosecrans Street. The cost of the interchange was projected to be $10.86 million (about $78 million in 2024 dollars). SR 109 was planned to follow Camino del Rio up to the Frontier traffic circle, where the city of San Diego would resume construction; both SR 109 and SR 209 were to be built in the future. The eight-lane freeway was projected to relieve traffic in the Frontier Street area coming from the San Diego Sports Arena. Bidding for the SR 109 contract was to begin in 1968, after the City Council endorsed the route in December 1967. Completion of both the interchange and SR 109 was planned for early 1969. An interchange was planned at Midway Drive, and the western end of the freeway was to be at Sunset Cliffs and Nimitz boulevards. The cost of the SR 109 project was estimated to be $2.3 million (about $16 million in 2024 dollars).

The ramp from south I-5 to Camino del Rio opened in February 1968, and a second ramp from southbound I-5 to eastbound I-8 opened in August 1968, with the remainder of the project to be completed in summer 1969. The groundbreaking for the Ocean Beach Freeway took place on September 23, 1968, with the estimated completion to take place within 15 months. However, rain in February 1969 delayed many construction projects across the county, including the SR 109 extension. The entire project was completed in September, with the road scheduled to open in October. The routing of SR 109 was officially added to I-8 in 1972.

==== Subsequent expansion ====
Even before the freeway was complete in California, bidding began in 1964 on widening I-8 from six to eight lanes between near Fairmount Avenue and Spring Street, in San Diego and La Mesa. Three years later, a contract was granted for the widening of the Fairmount Avenue to Ward Road stretch, adding two lanes to the freeway. In 1974, the San Diego City Council reached an agreement with state officials to improve I-8 from east of Pacific Highway to Texas Street, over the objections of Councilman Floyd Morrow, who objected to solving traffic issues by continuing to expand freeways. The cost was estimated to be $8 million (about $39 million in 2024 dollars).

The La Mesa City Council asked the state to modify the interchange with SR 125 in 1974; the original interchange did not allow for access to SR 125 from I-8 east or to I-8 west from SR 125. Widening of the portion from SR 125 to El Cajon Boulevard to five lanes in each direction was under way in October. By 1981, the environmental impact report had been completed, and the $50 million (about $146 million in 2024 dollars) project to add ramps and widen I-8 was awaiting clearance from the Federal Highway Administration. Additional ramps to SR 67 were nearing completion in May 1985, and were completed to I-15 north in October. In 1986, the project revamping the SR 125 interchange was under way, at a cost of $80 million (about $194 million in 2024 dollars); it would add two more lanes to I-8 from Jackson Drive to Fuerte Drive, and allow for SR 125 to be extended north past I-8.

By 1977, traffic had reached 172,300 vehicles a day, which had increased by nearly 10 percent over the previous year. It was hoped that the construction of SR 52 would help to reduce the congestion. A revised Mission Gorge Road eastbound exit opened in 1979, merging with traffic from I-15. Traffic reached 212,000 vehicles a day by February 1981, and Caltrans declared I-8 east of I-805 the busiest highway in the region. In 1987, Caltrans determined that I-8 west between College Avenue and Waring Road carried 2400 cars per hour, which it reported was the highest ratio of cars to number of lanes worldwide. Plans to add another lane to I-8 west from College Avenue to I-15 began in March 1992.

Caltrans proposed the installation of a metered traffic signal on I-8 west in Lakeside during 1987, in order to improve traffic flow in the mornings by inserting a short delay before entering San Diego should the rate exceed 2,000 vehicles per hour. However, the state put its plans on hold shortly thereafter, following several concerns from the public, and from state senator Jim Ellis.

=== Cuyamaca Mountains ===
==== Early road ====
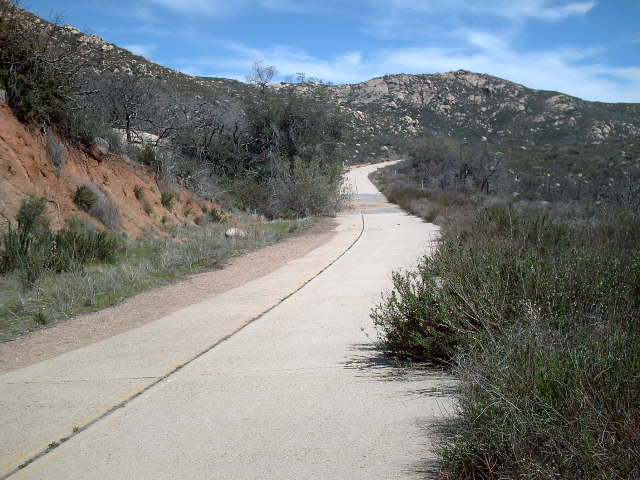
A section of old US 80 (Wildwood Glen Lane) now closed to vehicular traffic west of Descanso Junction

A stagecoach road existed into the 19th century that passed through the mountains east of San Diego. Before the freeway was constructed, the automobile road through the mountains east of San Diego was narrow and wound through the mountains; it was officially dedicated in 1912. This trip was known to take up to four hours, and frequently resulted in the radiator boiling over, flat tires, or broken fan belts; inclement weather would result in cars becoming mired in the mud. The road was paved in 1926, and was open by 1927; remnants of this road were still present in the late 20th century. Another road was built in the early 1930s, to remove curves and widen the lanes. This was a two-lane road that still had many switchbacks, with one popularly known as "Dead Man's Curve". Construction of I-8 took place atop much of the roadbed of the highway from the early 1930s. The delay in extending a road to San Diego caused increased development in Los Angeles and resulted in that city becoming the trade and population center of Southern California, according to the San Diego Union.

==== Planning and construction ====
Completion of the freeway was the second highest priority according to the Highway Development Association in May 1963, after the I-5 freeway. Bidding began on the portion from Broadway in El Cajon to Harritt Road in September 1963. This section of the freeway was to parallel US 80 to the south up to Lakeview Road, and then to the north. This portion of the freeway was scheduled to be complete by May 1965. By January 1965, I-8 had been completed from I-5 east to an interchange with Lake Jennings Park Road, just south of the latter's intersection with the southern terminus of Harritt Road. At a cost of $3.44 million (about $26 million in 2024 dollars), the project reduced the grade and curves at what was known as "Tunnel Hill" that hindered the flow of traffic. The part of the freeway from west of Harritt Road to west of Alpine was up for bidding in October 1964, and the Highway Commission set aside $2.1 million (about $16 million in 2024 dollars) for this 1.6-mile-long (2.6 km) stretch in February 1965. A contract for $1.42 million (about $11 million in 2024 dollars) was issued in August 1965. The entire 6-mile (9.7 km) stretch from Lake Jennings Road to Harbison Canyon Road was under construction by September 1965 and was scheduled to be complete by the next year.

In the Mountain Springs pass between San Diego and Imperial counties, the eastbound lanes traverse the pass on the former roadbed of US 80 through In-Ko-Pah Gorge near Myers Creek. The westbound lanes were placed on a different routing through Devil's Canyon that had been constructed by November 1963. A contract for paving the 9.7 miles (15.6 km) from the San Diego–Imperial county line to SR 98, including the eastbound lanes, was given to the Isbell Construction Company for $3.69 million (about $29 million in 2024 dollars) in May 1963. This portion was completed in May 1965 "through some of the most rugged, hottest sections of San Diego and Imperial counties," according to The San Diego Union. Construction ran into difficulties following concerns regarding potential landslides. The westbound lanes were built first, and temporarily contained both directions of traffic while the old highway was converted into the eastbound lanes. The Los Angeles Times described the stretch east of Mountain Springs as follows: "Through it the freeway engineers have hacked two separate roadways not even in sight of each other, but so overpowering in the sheer magnitude of the cuts through the mountains that it is almost impossible to believe human beings could have so overpowered hostile nature ...." Access to the site for construction workers was difficult, and many slopes had to be stabilized. Temperatures reached 120 °F (49 °C) in the summer and 4 °F (−16 °C) in winter, with winds reaching up to 80 mph (130 km/h). While using nuclear explosions to conduct blasting operations in the Laguna Mountains was considered as a possibility, the proposal was not considered to be practical at the time. Two cables and a hook were used to move girders into place; this was the first use of a cable in Southern California road construction.

The portion from Boulevard to near the Imperial County line was included in the California Highway Commission budget for 1965–1966. A 6.7-mile (10.8 km) extension from Mountain Springs west to what was then known as Road J-35 was given $3.3 million (about $25 million in 2024 dollars) in funding by the Highway Commission in May 1965. The 10-mile (16 km) section in between this one and the Mountain Springs pass section was in planning by that September, and was scheduled to begin the building phase shortly thereafter, with the section extending west of Boulevard to follow. That section, from Crestwood to Boulevard, was to begin construction soon after the $3 million (about $22 million in 2024 dollars) contract was given out in January 1966. The coming of the freeway from both west and east of Jacumba was projected to be a significant event in the history of the town. Cafes and gas stations went out of business once the freeway bypassed the town; however, many retirees relocated into the town since the high traffic levels were gone. The labeling of the town Boulevard as Manzanita on I-8 signs raised controversy and forced the Division of Highways to obscure the name on the signs until the issue was resolved.

Construction continued with the issuing of a $6.55 million contract (about $47 million in 2024 dollars) to widen a 5.7-mile (9.2 km) section of I-8 through Alpine, from Harbison Canyon to east of West Victoria Drive, and to begin construction in April or May 1967, to be completed in 1969. This would leave only a 30-mile (48 km) stretch of I-8 that was not at freeway standards. As the process continued, concerns about increased smog from the additional traffic were raised in October 1967. A 3.7-mile (6.0 km) section to the east of Alpine was scheduled to have bidding opened in November of that year, and was to be finished in 1968; this would produce a continuous freeway from San Diego to the eastern terminus of this route. Both of these projects were underway by May 1968. An additional contract was given out for $7.8 million (about $54 million in 2024 dollars) in August to continue the freeway east from Alpine Street to Japatul Valley Road; this would bring the freeway near Descanso Junction. Roughly 5.5 million cubic yards (4.2×10^{6} m^{3}) of dirt and rock were to be generated by all three of these construction projects, since half of a mountain would have to be removed with a million pounds of dynamite. The third project was built near the site of an abandoned attempt to build a tunnel for the old highway after World War II, which proved to be too expensive.

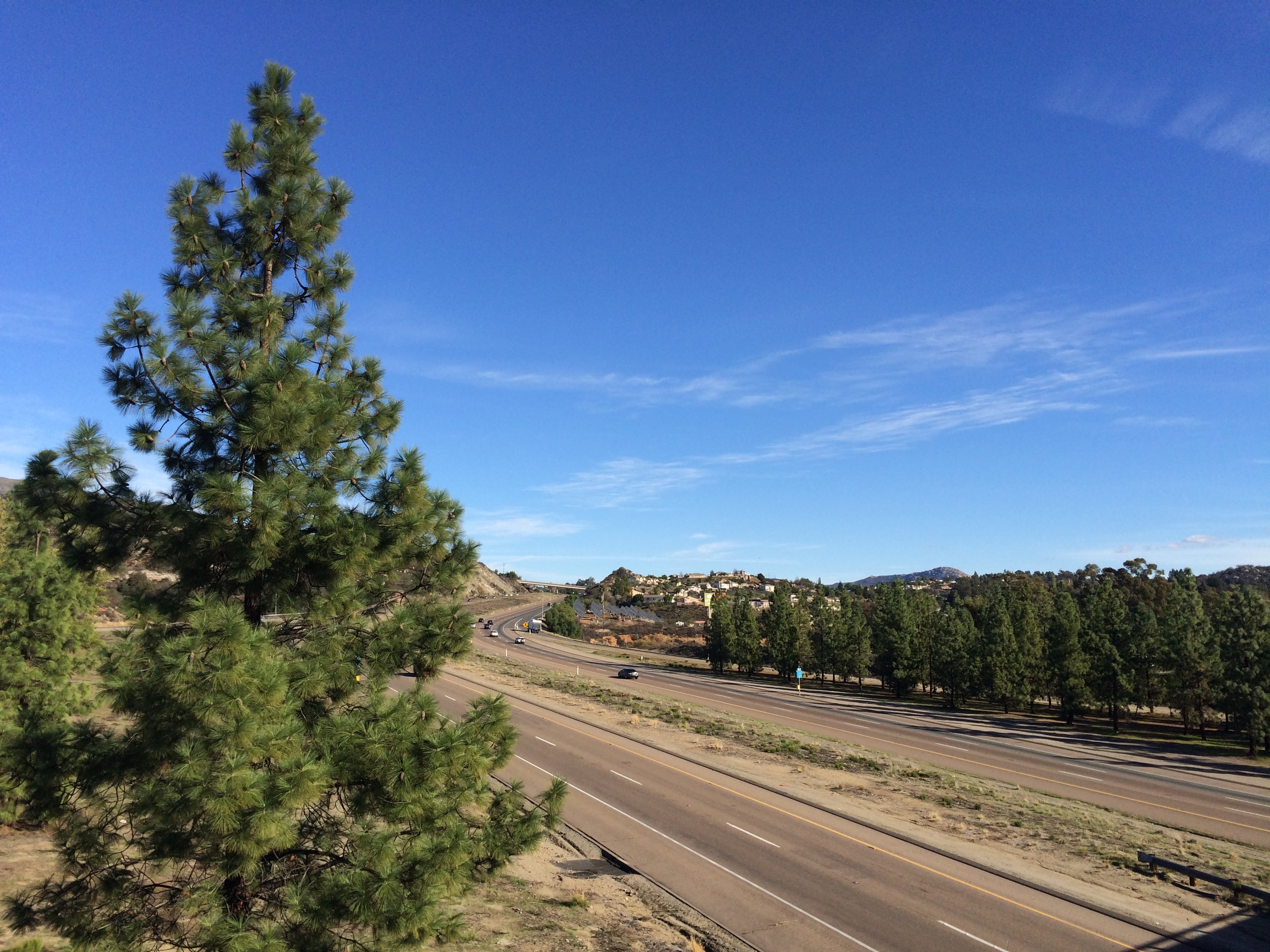
I-8 in Alpine

By mid-February 1969, one segment of the freeway running through Alpine was nearing completion and was scheduled to open on February 21; another section was scheduled to open in April. However, although dirt and rocks were transported on a conveyor belt across US 80 to become part of an embankment for the Sweetwater River Bridge, the grading of the mountain near Viejas Grade and the Sweetwater River had not been completed on the final link. The historic Ellis Grade radiator stop was to be removed and replaced with one at Vista Point. On April 19, 1969, the part 2.5 mi (4.0 km) east of Alpine opened to traffic. All of the Alpine part of I-8 opened on May 22, 1969, after a ribbon-cutting ceremony; yet the Viejas Grade segment was now projected to be completed by 1972. The bridge over the Sweetwater River was under construction by 1970, and the entire segment cost $22.1 million (about $137 million in 2024 dollars). By May, this segment was estimated to be completed in the later part of that year. The leveling of the grade resulted in the second highest fill in the state at 360 ft (110 m).

==== Finishing the freeway ====
The final portion of I-8 in California, between Japatul Valley Road and west of Boulevard, was prioritized in the 1969–1970 state budget. Due to financial concerns, it was announced in September 1968 that the target date for completing the Interstate Highway System would be extended until 1974, from 1972. The missing portion of I-8 was expected to cost $45 million and be constructed in three parts, with one part being started each year. The segments between Japatul Valley Road and west of Laguna Junction, and from La Posta Road to west of Boulevard, were delayed for an entire year at the end of 1969 due to a nationwide effort to fight inflation by reducing spending. A 6.6-mile (10.6 km) segment from Buckman Springs to Crestwood received funding in May 1970, which would leave only an 8-mile (13 km) stretch of the freeway uncompleted when built. The drive time from San Diego to El Centro had been reduced to two hours, according to the California Division of Highways. By August 1970, the remainder of the freeway had been funded, with the part from Japatul Valley Road to Laguna Junction costing $22 million (about $137 million in 2024 dollars), and the Laguna Junction to Crestwood portion costing $15 million (about $93 million in 2024 dollars).

In May 1971, El Centro Mayor Alex Gay requested that passing lanes be added to the remaining two-lane part of I-8 in between El Centro and San Diego due to the frequent traffic jams in between Japatul Valley and Crestwood. At this time, this was the only missing link through the mountains. Bidding took place on the $16.5 million (about $98 million in 2024 dollars) La Posta Road to Crestwood Road and the Japatul Valley Road to Sunrise Highway portions in November 1971. As part of this series of projects, the highest concrete bridge in the state at the time was to be built at 430 ft (130 m) over Pine Valley Creek on the segment between Japatul Valley Road and Sunrise Highway. The contract came in at $22.6 million (about $128 million in 2024 dollars), over $5 million (about $28 million in 2024 dollars) beyond budget due to the difficulty of the bridge construction. All three of the projects to complete I-8 were projected to be complete by mid-1974. However, in March 1972, it was announced that the La Posta Road portion of the project would be delayed due to budget troubles.

By the beginning of 1974, the new projected completion date for I-8 was mid-1975, with 22 mi (35 km) of two-lane highway remaining. The Pine Valley Creek bridge and the segment extending from Japatul Valley Road to Pine Valley was dedicated on November 24, 1974, and was scheduled to open on November 26; this left 8 mi (13 km) of freeway to be constructed. The final stretch of I-8 in California, from Sunrise Highway to La Posta Road, was completed in May 1975.

The Buckman Springs rest area opened in January 1979 in eastern San Diego County. In 1987, the first 65 mph (105 km/h) speed limit sign was posted east of El Cajon, the first one in the state; the speed limit on all I-8 east of El Cajon, except for the Mountain Springs Grade portion, was raised similarly.

=== Imperial Valley ===
==== Construction ====
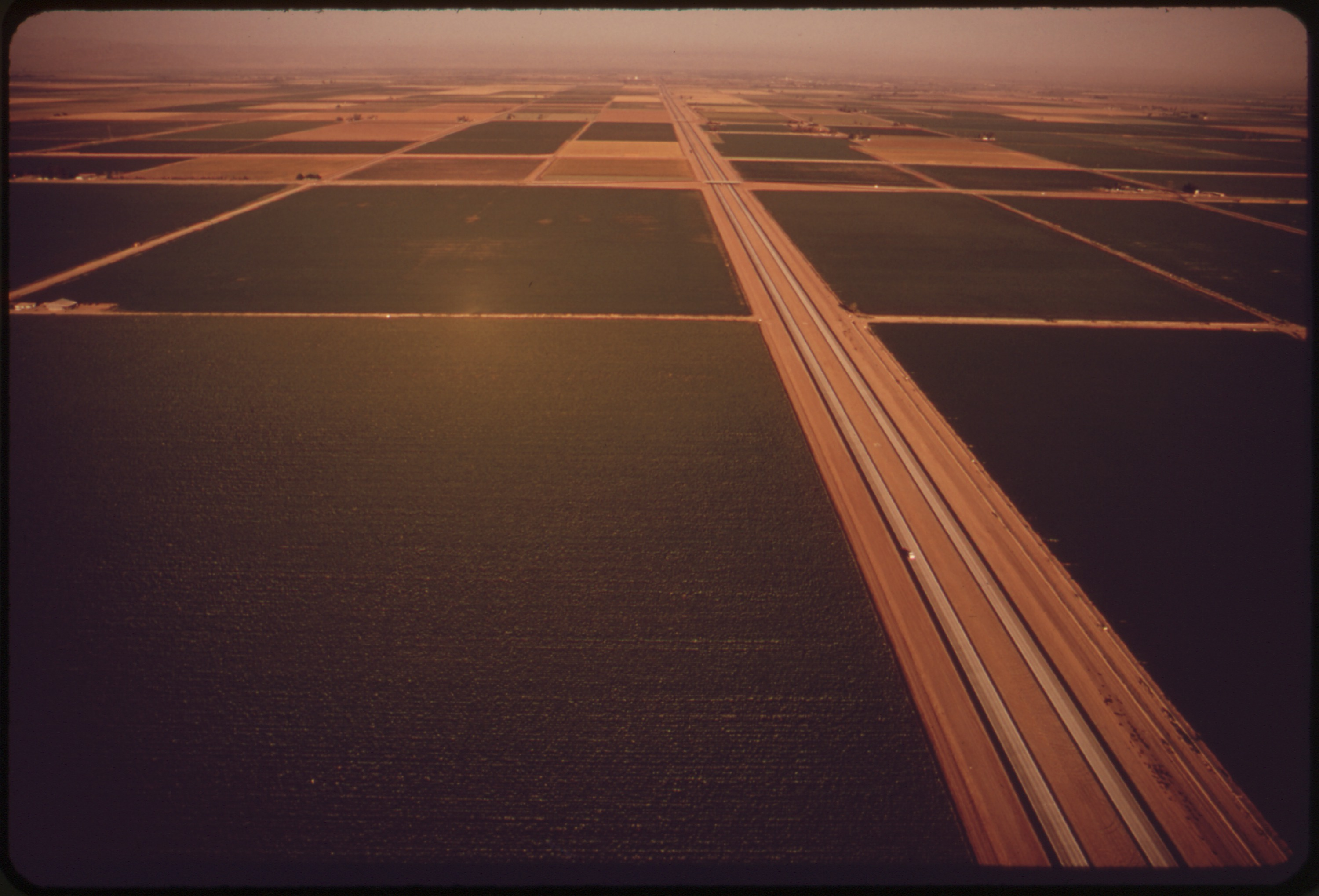
I-8 in the Imperial Valley, 1972

The highway through Imperial Valley was originally a plank road made of pieces of wood that were tied together. The Ocean-to-Ocean Bridge across the Colorado River was open in 1915. Following this, US 80 was built through the valley as the main east–west route. Plans for a new freeway across the southernmost reaches of California date from before 1950. The bridge over the Colorado River was replaced in 1956, at a cost of $1.2 million, and was in use until 1978, when the I-8 bridge was built. In 1957, the City of El Centro expressed a desire for the new freeway to replace US 80 to be routed along the southern limits of the city. Caltrans engineer Jacob Dekema stated at the time that the four-lane freeway would not be constructed on the US 80 routing due to possible expansion of the Naval Air Facility El Centro.

In October 1964, the portion of I-8 between Imperial Avenue in El Centro to SR 111 appeared in the state budget. By December, a route for the part of I-8 just west of the Colorado River was being examined by the California Highway Commission. Construction was underway on the stretch from Seeley to SR 111 by June 1966, and the entire portion through the county was planned for completion by 1968. This 12.2-mile (19.6 km) portion, extending west to Drew Road, was planned for completion by early 1967, at a cost of $200 million (about $1.43 billion in 2024 dollars); however, by then, the date for completion of the freeway had slipped to 1972. The state ordered the building of the portion from west of Coyote Wells to just east of Drew Road in September 1967. The next year, Dekema indicated that the goal was to have I-8 completed by 1973, citing a deadline in order to have the federal government pay for up to ninety percent of the costs; the other freeways in the region were to be delayed because of this.

In early 1970, the portion of the freeway from west of Ogilby Road to east of Algodones Road was under construction, and projections were to have this portion completed by later that year. This $5.2 million (about $32 million in 2024 dollars) project also included resurfacing the freeway that had already been built through the Colorado Desert Sandhills; this part of the freeway had been built between 1961 and 1965. By this time, it was estimated that the drive from San Diego to El Centro now took 2 hours, as opposed to the 3.5 hours required two decades earlier, and the two days required in the pioneer era. This part of the freeway was opened in July 1970. As the freeway was constructed through the valley, it caused a break in many north–south roads. These breaks were located where access to the part of the road on the other side of the freeway was cut off. Plans were put in place to build frontage roads to improve access through the region.

The 16-mile (26 km) portion of I-8 bypassing Holtville began construction in December 1969, and was nearing completion in May 1971, to result in a continuous freeway that connected two existing segments from Crestwood in San Diego County to just west of Winterhaven. It was estimated that the bypass would save travelers 20 minutes of travel time through the Imperial Valley. The cost of this project was $11.2 million (about $73 million in 2024 dollars). However, Holtville residents raised concerns about SR 115 providing the only access to the eastern part of the city, notably the narrow and curved portion leading from the freeway into town. Work on the Holtville portion began at 3:30 a.m. daily during the summer in order to avoid the desert heat. In addition to this, construction of the Highline Canal overpass involved a 120-foot (37 m) steel span that was prefabricated and made of girders that were hoisted into position by barges. The Matich Construction Company attempted to set the world record for laying the most concrete in a day, aided by the level terrain, but failed to do so after the concrete mixer malfunctioned. That same year, bids for an Arizona plant inspection station near Winterhaven, next to the California agricultural inspection station, were submitted.

The last 6.5-mile (10.5 km) part of the California portion, from near Algodones Road to west of the Arizona state line, was to enter the bidding phase in early 1972. I-8 was scheduled to be completed in the summer of 1975 between San Diego and Yuma, although there would be a break in the freeway around Yuma; this occurred by October 1975. At the time the California portion was completed, it was the preferred route to Phoenix from some areas of Los Angeles, since I-10 had not been completed.

The missing portion of the highway was the new bridge over the Colorado River, which was built at a cost of $7.4 million (about $33 million in 2024 dollars). In June 1975, there were concerns regarding the state delaying new construction projects due to financial concerns, and the effects this would have on the bridge. The bid for the project was awarded to Novo-Rados Construction in October 1975, as one of the final projects before the construction freeze. The new bridge, which replaced the old US 80 bridge, was dedicated on August 18, 1978; this completed I-8 from San Diego to Casa Grande. The Arizona Department of Transportation and the City of Yuma assisted in the planning process. By the time the California portion of the freeway was complete, the average cost was $1 million per mile (about $4 million in 2024 dollars). The bridge opened on September 20, 1978. The State of California was responsible for the bridge erection, even though the State of Arizona owned half of the bridge.

==== Fratianno allegations ====
Jimmy Fratianno was associated with Frank Bompensiero, the San Diego mafia leader, in a criminal lawsuit involving the Fratianno Trucking Company and the Miles and Sons Trucking Company in 1966; he was known to law enforcement as "the Mafia's West Coast executioner," with up to 16 deaths for which he was potentially responsible. Both companies were awarded the contracts to transport dirt during the construction of I-8 in El Centro. Drivers were coerced to agree to buy the trucks, although the Fratianno Company still retained the ownership; they also had portions of their wages withheld from them. Following this, the drivers were loaned money from Leo Moceri, another mafia leader. An investigation in early 1966 after complaints from the drivers led to state charges against the two firms as well as five people in August. There were concerns that John Erreca, the state director of public works, had a conflict of interest with Fratianno and did not enforce the law; however, both Transportation Administrator Robert Bradford (upon a request for investigation from then Governor Pat Brown) and the Federal Bureau of Investigation found that there was no conflict of interest.

The truck drivers were given $36,000 (about $258,000 in 2024 dollars) in back pay from the state government. Fratianno and Bompensiero were charged with fraud, as well as state labor and public utility code violations. While charges were dropped against Bompensiero, Fratianno was found guilty. The Imperial County Board of Supervisors estimated that $25,000 (about $778,000 in 2024 dollars) in damage to county roads took place due to overloaded trucks. The federal government fined him $10,000 (about $69,000 in 2024 dollars), which he never paid, and placed him on probation for three years; he was imprisoned when he did not pay, but was released in September 1969. His ex-wife, Jewell, as well as the company, were fined $4,014 (about $24,000 in 2024 dollars) individually for their responsibility in the matter. For the state charges, he was sentenced in 1969 to one to three years in prison, after pleading guilty to the charges. He was incarcerated in Chico State Prison following a parole violation until 1973.

==== Storm damage ====
Following Tropical Storm Kathleen in September 1976, a flood eroded 400 pieces of the roadway from westbound I-8 near Ocotillo, resulting in the construction of a detour. The freeway reopened to traffic in February 1978 after the damage was repaired and a new bridge was built, at a cost of $1 million (about $4 million in 2024 dollars). But, in 1982, the freeway was closed again near Ocotillo due to flooding following another storm.

=== Construction in Arizona ===
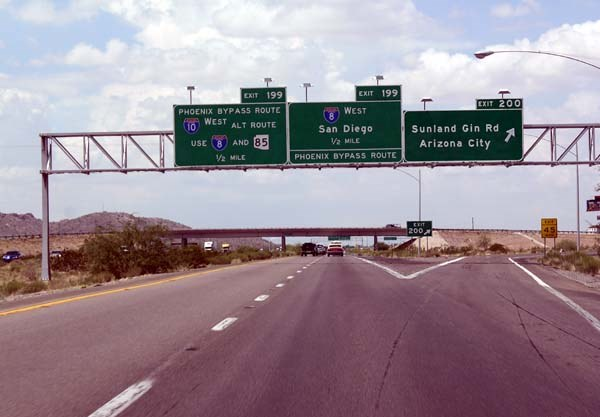
I-10 approaching the eastern terminus of I-8

Between Yuma and Gila Bend, I-8 runs alongside the routes of both the Gila Trail and the Butterfield Overland Mail Company line. The latter was a stagecoach line that went between Tipton, Missouri, and San Francisco, with several stations in between, and was used to transport passengers across the country at 5 mph (8.0 km/h) between 1858 and 1861. In later years, the Southern Pacific Railroad was constructed, paralleling the Gila River east of Fortuna; by 1877, the tracks were complete to Yuma. Work continued the next year, and, by 1880, the tracks were extended to Tucson from Yuma.

This portion of the route of US 80, predecessor of I-8, was originally part of the proposed state system of highways in 1921. By 1926, this section became part of the cross-country highway US 80. The route was not paved at this time, but was a gravel road along the entire corridor. By 1928, the portion of modern-day I-8 between Gila Bend and Casa Grande was designated as SR 84. A small portion of the highway was paved near Yuma and SR 84 was under construction by the next year. SR 84 was completed by 1930, but not paved, and the segment of US 80 between Aztec and Sentinel had been paved.

Paving of SR 84 had commenced by 1934, with the portion of the highway in Maricopa County being paved. A group of San Diego citizens raised concerns about the road from Yuma to Gila Bend not being paved in 1934, due to the impact that this would have on tourism in San Diego, and made a request to the federal government to have it paved. The entire future corridor of I-8 had been paved from Yuma to Casa Grande by 1935. Drivers were told to bring spare fan belts, radiator hoses, and additional drinking water for the journey traversing the desert. A "Shortcuts Association" began in 1952 to promote SR 84 as a route to bypass Phoenix on the way to San Diego.

With the coming of the Interstate Highways, the corridor was to be upgraded to Interstate standards. In late 1958, a group of motel owners whose properties were located on SR 84 strongly objected to any routing of I-8 that would not go through the city of Casa Grande. Motel owners in Yuma proposed their own alternative in 1961 to the four routings of I-8 through the city that had been proposed, raising concerns about losing revenue from tourism. In January 1962, the alternatives were narrowed down to two, with one of them being the route supported by the motel owners. However, nearby school officials expressed concerns regarding that route, because 1200 students would no longer be able to walk to school if the freeway was constructed along that route. Later that year, a new route had been proposed, along the Southern Pacific Railroad tracks and the Colorado River. Construction was completed on the first sections of I-8 in Arizona in 1958. The first section was 1.33 miles (2 kilometres) long, which included a grade-separated interchange south of the Painted Rock Petroglyph Site. The second section, which was 0.83 miles (1.34 kilometres) in length, also included a grade separated interchange at Aztec, just east of Dateland. The interchange at Sentinel, and the section between Aztec and the Maricopa County line, which included the construction of another interchange, were both completed in 1959. The initial construction was divided into four different sections awarded to different contractors. Work commenced with a section of US 80 between Sentinel and Gila Bend on December 10, 1960. This was also the section of I-8 completed in Arizona on April 18, 1962. By 1963, work was well under way, with portions of US 80 between Mohawk and Gila Bend, and SR 84 between Gila Bend and near Stanfield upgraded. Other merchants objected to the routing, and met with the Yuma County Board of Supervisors to raise their concerns following the final approval of the route in 1964. A new park was to be built east of the Colorado River crossing, just opposite downtown; city officials hoped that this would give an improved look to the town as drivers first arrived.

Nevertheless, there was controversy over the work in Arizona as well. In 1964, a U.S. House of Representatives investigation discovered that poor management and lack of efficiency were prevalent in four of the projects constructing the I-8 freeway. The Arizona Highway Department was specifically cited in the report for not taking into account protecting government interests when selecting labor for the projects. Several errors were discovered, and one of them, adding too much clay to the gravel mixture, cost the state of Arizona $26,278 (about $206,000 in 2024 dollars) to fix. By that year, construction had begun on the freeway west of Casa Grande, while the rest of the Arizona routing was in the design stages.

In 1965, a $1.46 million (about $11 million in 2024 dollars) contract was granted to build the 5.7-mile (9.2 km) portion from near Araby Road east through Fortuna Wash. Two years later, it was estimated that construction would be complete by 1969, except for the Colorado River bridge. The highway was in progress through the Telegraph Pass east of Yuma, and the portions from Avenue 9-E to 4-E, from there to 4th Street in Yuma, and to the river were estimated to cost $9.69 million (about $69 million in 2024 dollars) in total. Following local complaints, Francis Turner, the executive director of the federal Bureau of Public Roads, agreed to look at constructing an interchange at Trekell Road in Casa Grande again, after an earlier decline to do so. Work began on the Casa Grande part of the freeway in March 1968, at a cost of $3 million (about $21 million in 2024 dollars). That year, many gas station, motel, and restaurant owners noticed a drop in business, possibly due to concerns regarding construction traffic due to I-8; however, they hoped for increased business following completion of the freeway. The Yuma County Chamber of Commerce made plans to promote tourism in the town following the completion of I-8 by late 1968.

Bidding on the last portion of the freeway to be completed in Casa Grande, from Midway Road to I-10, was to begin in January 1969. By November, the freeway east of Yuma was under construction, at a cost of $3.7 million (about $24 million in 2024 dollars). On June 15, 1970, eastbound traffic began on I-8 in Casa Grande, with an exit at both Trekell and Thorton roads, with westbound traffic soon to follow. Businesses did not notice much change with the opening of the eastbound lanes. In 1971, I-8 was nearly complete, including a new alignment east of Yuma built parallel and to the south of the original US 80 alignment. A new alignment was also built to the south of the SR 84 alignment at the eastern end of the highway from southwest of Stanfield to the eastern terminus at I‑10 southeast of Casa Grande. The only portions of I-8 not completed at this time were the Gila Bend bypass and the western end near Yuma. The portion east of 16th Street in Yuma was completed in June 1972; the Arizona State Highway Commission authorized the $1.6 million (about $13 million in 2024 dollars) contract to construct the 6-mile (9.7 km) portion through Gila Bend in August. Some Yuma businesses had noticed a decrease in revenue at this time; the Arizona Highway Department agreed to modify some signs to eliminate any confusion. The part of I-8 between 16th and 4th streets was under construction in 1976, which was the only incomplete part of the freeway, along with the bridge over the Colorado River. The water treatment plant in Yuma was to be moved due to the potential of an accident with a vehicle carrying hazardous materials flying off the bridge and contaminating the water supply. The freeway in both states was completed with the opening of the bridge on September 20, 1978.

As the Interstate was completed, the highways that it replaced were removed from the state highway system. In 1973, the SR 84 designation was removed from the highway from Gila Bend to the split where I-8 followed a new alignment southwest of Stanfield. In 1977, the US 80 designation was removed from this stretch in favor of I-8.

== Exit list ==
State	County	Location	mi	km	Exit	Destinations	Notes
California	San Diego	San Diego	0.00	0.00		Nimitz Boulevard / Sunset Cliffs Boulevard – Mission Bay Park	At-grade intersection
California	San Diego	San Diego	0.50	0.80	1	West Mission Bay Drive / Sports Arena Boulevard	Westbound exit and eastbound entrance
California	San Diego	San Diego	1.67	2.69	2A	I-5 north – Los Angeles	Westbound exit and eastbound entrance; I-5 south exit 20; former US 101 north
California	San Diego	San Diego	1.67	2.69	2B	Rosecrans Street	Westbound exit and eastbound entrance; former SR 209 south
California	San Diego	San Diego	1.67	2.69	2B	I-5 south – Downtown	Signed as exit 2 eastbound; I-5 north exit 20; former US 101 south
California	San Diego	San Diego	2.03	3.27	2C	Morena Boulevard	No eastbound exit
California	San Diego	San Diego	2.60	4.18	3	Taylor Street / Hotel Circle	
California	San Diego	San Diego	3.88	6.24	4A	Hotel Circle	Westbound exit is via exit 3
California	San Diego	San Diego	4.06	6.53	4B–C	SR 163 – Downtown, Escondido	Signed as exits 4B (south) and 4C (north) eastbound and as exits 4A (south) and 4B (north) westbound; SR 163 exits 3A-B; former US 395
California	San Diego	San Diego	4.69	7.55	5	Mission Center Road / Auto Circle	
California	San Diego	San Diego	5.55	8.93	6A	Texas Street / Qualcomm Way	Qualcomm Way was formerly Stadium Way
California	San Diego	San Diego	6.03	9.70	6B	I-805 – Los Angeles, National City, Chula Vista	I-805 north exit 17; south exit 17B
California	San Diego	San Diego	7.29– 7.31	11.73– 11.76	7	I-15 north – Riverside SR 15 south	Signed as exits 7A (south) and 7B (north) westbound; I-15 south / SR 15 north exit 6B; former SR 103
California	San Diego	San Diego	7.94	12.78	8	Mission Gorge Road / Fairmount Avenue	Eastbound exit is part of exit 7
California	San Diego	San Diego	8.71	14.02	9	Waring Road	
California	San Diego	San Diego	9.99	16.08	10	College Avenue	Serves San Diego State University
California	San Diego	La Mesa	11.24	18.09	11	Lake Murray Boulevard / 70th Street	
California	San Diego	La Mesa	12.22	19.67	12	Fletcher Parkway / Baltimore Drive	Baltimore Drive not signed eastbound
California	San Diego	La Mesa	12.62	20.31	13A	Spring Street – Downtown La Mesa	No westbound exit
California	San Diego	La Mesa	12.75	20.52	13A	El Cajon Boulevard	Westbound exit and eastbound entrance; former I-8 Bus. and US 80 west
California	San Diego	La Mesa	13.41	21.58	13B	Jackson Drive / Grossmont Boulevard	No eastbound entrance; no westbound signage for Grossmont Boulevard
California	San Diego	La Mesa	14.05	22.61	14A	La Mesa Boulevard / Grossmont Center Drive	Signed as exit 14B eastbound
California	San Diego	La Mesa	14.20	22.85	14B	SR 125	Signed as exit 14A eastbound; exit 18A on SR 125; formerly SR 67 south of I-8
California	San Diego	La Mesa	14.30	23.01	14C	Severin Drive / Fuerte Drive	
California	San Diego	El Cajon	15.31	24.64	15	El Cajon Boulevard (I-8 Bus. east)	Eastbound exit and westbound entrance; former US 80 east
California	San Diego	El Cajon	16.24	26.14	16	Main Street	
California	San Diego	El Cajon	16.95	27.28	17A	Johnson Avenue	Eastbound exit and westbound entrance
California	San Diego	El Cajon	17.45	28.08	17B–C	SR 67 north / Magnolia Avenue – Santee, Lakeside, Ramona	Signed as exits 17B (SR 67) and 17C (Magnolia Avenue) eastbound; SR 67 exit 1
California	San Diego	El Cajon	18.12	29.16	18	Mollison Avenue	
California	San Diego	El Cajon	19.01	30.59	19	2nd Street (SR 54 Bus. west)	Former SR 54 west
California	San Diego	El Cajon	19.50	31.38	20A	East Main Street (I-8 Bus. west)	Westbound exit and eastbound entrance
California	San Diego	El Cajon	20.40	32.83	20B	Greenfield Drive – Crest	Signed as exit 20 eastbound
California	San Diego	Lakeside	21.69	34.91	22	Los Coches Road – Lakeside	
California	San Diego	Lakeside	23.47	37.77	23	Lake Jennings Park Road	
California	San Diego		27.34	44.00	27	Dunbar Lane – Harbison Canyon	
California	San Diego	Alpine	30.11	48.46	30	Tavern Road (I-8 Bus. east) – Alpine	
California	San Diego	Alpine	32.99	53.09	33	Willows Road / Alpine Boulevard (I-8 Bus. west) – Alpine	Serves Viejas Reservation
California	San Diego		35.98	57.90	36	East Willows Road	Former US 80
California	San Diego		39.48	63.54	40	SR 79 north (Japatul Valley Road) – Descanso, Julian	Serves Viejas Reservation
California	San Diego	Pine Valley	45.18	72.71	45	Pine Valley, Julian	
California	San Diego	Pine Valley	46.58	74.96	47	Sunrise Highway (CR S1)	
California	San Diego		50.49	81.26	51	Buckman Springs Road	
California	San Diego		53.63	86.31	54	Kitchen Creek Road – Cameron Station	
California	San Diego	Campo Indian Reservation	60.50	97.37	61	Crestwood Road – Live Oak Springs	Serves Campo Indian Reservation, La Posta Reservation, Manzanita Indian Reservation
California	San Diego		65.25	105.01	65	SR 94 west – Campo, Boulevard	
California	San Diego		73.30	117.96	73	Jacumba	
California	San Diego–Imperial county line		76.93	123.81	77	In-Ko-Pah Park Road	
California	Imperial		80.21	129.09	80	Mountain Springs Road	
California	Imperial		87.13	140.22	87	SR 98 east – Calexico	Eastbound exit and westbound entrance
California	Imperial	Ocotillo	89.04	143.30	89	Imperial Highway (CR S2) – Ocotillo	Former U.S. Route 80 east
California	Imperial		100.60	161.90	101	Dunaway Road	
California	Imperial		107.05	172.28	107	Drew Road (CR S29) – Seeley	
California	Imperial		111.11	178.81	111	Forrester Road (CR S30)	
California	Imperial	El Centro	114.09	183.61	114	Imperial Avenue (I-8 Bus. east) – El Centro	
California	Imperial	El Centro	115.09	185.22	115	SR 86 (4th Street / I-8 Bus. west) – El Centro	Former US 99
California	Imperial	El Centro	116.08	186.81	116	Dogwood Road (CR S31)	
California	Imperial		118.06	190.00	118	SR 111 – Brawley, Indio, Calexico	Signed as exits 118A (south) and 118B (north)
California	Imperial		119.66	192.57	120	Bowker Road	
California	Imperial		124.90	201.01	125	SR 7 south / Orchard Road (CR S32)	
California	Imperial		127.61	205.37	128	Bonds Corner Road	Former SR 115
California	Imperial		130.62	210.21	131	SR 115 north (Van Der Linden Road) – Holtville	
California	Imperial		142.87	229.93	143	SR 98 west – Calexico	
California	Imperial		145.95	234.88	146	Brock Research Center Road	Serves Brock Reservoir
California	Imperial		150.60	242.37	151	Gordons Well	Former US 80 west
California	Imperial		155.82	250.77	156	Grays Well Road	
California	Imperial		158.81	255.58	159	Ogilby Road (CR S34)	
California	Imperial	Felicity	163.69	263.43	164	Sidewinder Road	
California	Imperial		164.30	264.42	Agricultural Inspection Station (westbound only)		
California	Imperial	Araz Junction	165.73	266.72	166	SR 186 south (Algodones Road) – Andrade, Mexico	Former US 80 east
California	Imperial	Fort Yuma Indian Reservation	169.97	273.54	170	Winterhaven Drive (I-8 Bus. east)	Western terminus of I-8 Bus.
California	Imperial	Fort Yuma Indian Reservation	171.54	276.07	172	Fourth Avenue (SR 8U south / I-8 Bus.) – Winterhaven	Former US 80
Colorado River			171.98 0.00	276.77 0.00	California–Arizona line		
Arizona	Yuma	Yuma	0.59	0.95	1	Redondo Center Drive / Giss Parkway	Redondo Center Drive not signed westbound
Arizona	Yuma	Yuma	2.23	3.59	2	US 95 (16th Street)	
Arizona	Yuma	Yuma	3.98	6.41	3	Avenue 3E	Former SR 280
Arizona	Yuma	Yuma	7.66	12.33	7	SR 195 south (Araby Road) – San Luis	
Arizona	Yuma	Yuma	9.44	15.19	9	BL 8 west (Historic US 80 west) / Avenue 8 1/2E	Eastern terminus of I-8 BL; former US 80 west
Arizona	Yuma	Fortuna Foothills	12.27	19.75	12	To US 95 north (Fortuna Road)	
Arizona	Yuma	Fortuna Foothills	14.28	22.98	14	Foothills Boulevard	
Arizona	Yuma		21.06	33.89	21	Historic US 80 east – Dome Valley	Former US 80 east
Arizona	Yuma	Wellton	30.84	49.63	30	Avenue 29E – Wellton	
Arizona	Yuma	Noah	37.99	61.14	37	Avenue 36E – Roll	
Arizona	Yuma		42.10	67.75	42	Avenue 40E – Tacna	
Arizona	Yuma		54.98	88.48	54	Historic US 80 west / Avenue 52E – Mohawk Valley	Former US 80 west
Arizona	Yuma		67.49	108.61	67	Historic US 80 east – Dateland	
Arizona	Yuma		73.53	118.34	73	Aztec Road (Historic US 80 west)	
Arizona	Yuma		78.51	126.35	78	Spot Road	
Arizona	Maricopa		87.10	140.17	87	Sentinel, Hyder, Agua Caliente	
Arizona	Maricopa		102.34	164.70	102	Painted Rock Road	Serves Painted Rock Petroglyph Site
Arizona	Maricopa		106.56	171.49	106	Paloma Road	
Arizona	Maricopa	Gila Bend	111.49	179.43	111	Citrus Valley Road	
Arizona	Maricopa	Gila Bend	115.68	186.17	115	BL 8 east (Historic US 80 east) / SR 85 – Phoenix, Ajo	Former US 80 east
Arizona	Maricopa	Gila Bend			118	SR 85 north	Future interchange
Arizona	Maricopa	Gila Bend	119.47	192.27	119	Butterfield Trail (BL 8 west) to SR 85 north / I-10	Former SR 84 west
Arizona	Maricopa		140.86	226.69	140	Freeman Road	Access to Sonoran Desert National Monument
Arizona	Maricopa		144.60	232.71	144	Vekol Valley Road	
Arizona	Pinal		151.73	244.19	151	SR 84 east to SR 347 north – Maricopa	
Arizona	Pinal		161.61	260.09	161	Stanfield	
Arizona	Pinal		167.61	269.74	167	Montgomery Road	
Arizona	Pinal		169.72	273.14	169	Bianco Road	
Arizona	Pinal		172.62	277.80	172	Thornton Road – Casa Grande	
Arizona	Pinal		174.62	281.02	174	Trekell Road – Casa Grande	
Arizona	Pinal	Casa Grande	178.36	287.04	178	I-10 – Phoenix, Tucson	Signed as exits 178A (west) and 178B (east); additional entrance from Sunland Gin Road; exit 199 on I-10
1.000 mi = 1.609 km; 1.000 km = 0.621 mi: Incomplete access; Unopened

== Auxiliary routes ==
Business I-8 shield

There are no three-digit auxiliary routes of I-8. However, there are four signed business routes related to I-8 that provide additional access to particular towns or cities:

- El Cajon Boulevard passes through downtown El Cajon.
- The El Centro business loop runs along Adams Avenue in downtown El Centro.
- The Winterhaven–Yuma business loop begins in Winterhaven before crossing the Colorado River into Yuma and providing access to the downtown area, ending in eastern Yuma.
- The Gila Bend business loop connects with Arizona State Route 85.
