= Yuha Desert =

Desert in southern California

Coordinates: 32°43′N 115°50′W

The Yuha Desert is a section of the Sonoran Desert located in the Imperial Valley of California, south of Interstate 8, west of El Centro, and north of the international border.

Unique aspects of the Yuha Desert include the Oyster Shell Beds, De Anza Historical Monument, Crucifixion Thorn Natural Area (named after the Castela emoryi), and the Yuha geoglyph. It is the homeland of the Kamia, also spelled Kumeyaay, and may have been used by other Native American groups such as the Cahuilla, Quechan, and Cocopah Native American people. The Juan Bautista de Anza National Historic Trail travels through the Yuha Desert.

The Yuha Basin portion of the Yuha Desert is designated an Area of Critical Environmental Concern by the Bureau of Land Management and is managed by the agency as a limited-use area for biologic and archaeological resource conservation. The primary species of concern is the flat-tailed horned lizard. Off-highway vehicles are limited to signed routes to protect both the flat-tail horned lizard habitat and the archaeological resources including prehistoric campsites and lithic reduction sites along the former edges of Lake Cahuilla, as well as sites representing the use of the region within the historic era.

== See also ==
- List of flora of the Sonoran Desert Region by common name
