= Smuggler's Gulch =

Canyon located in the U.S. state of California and the Mexican state of Baja California

- Cañón del Matadero
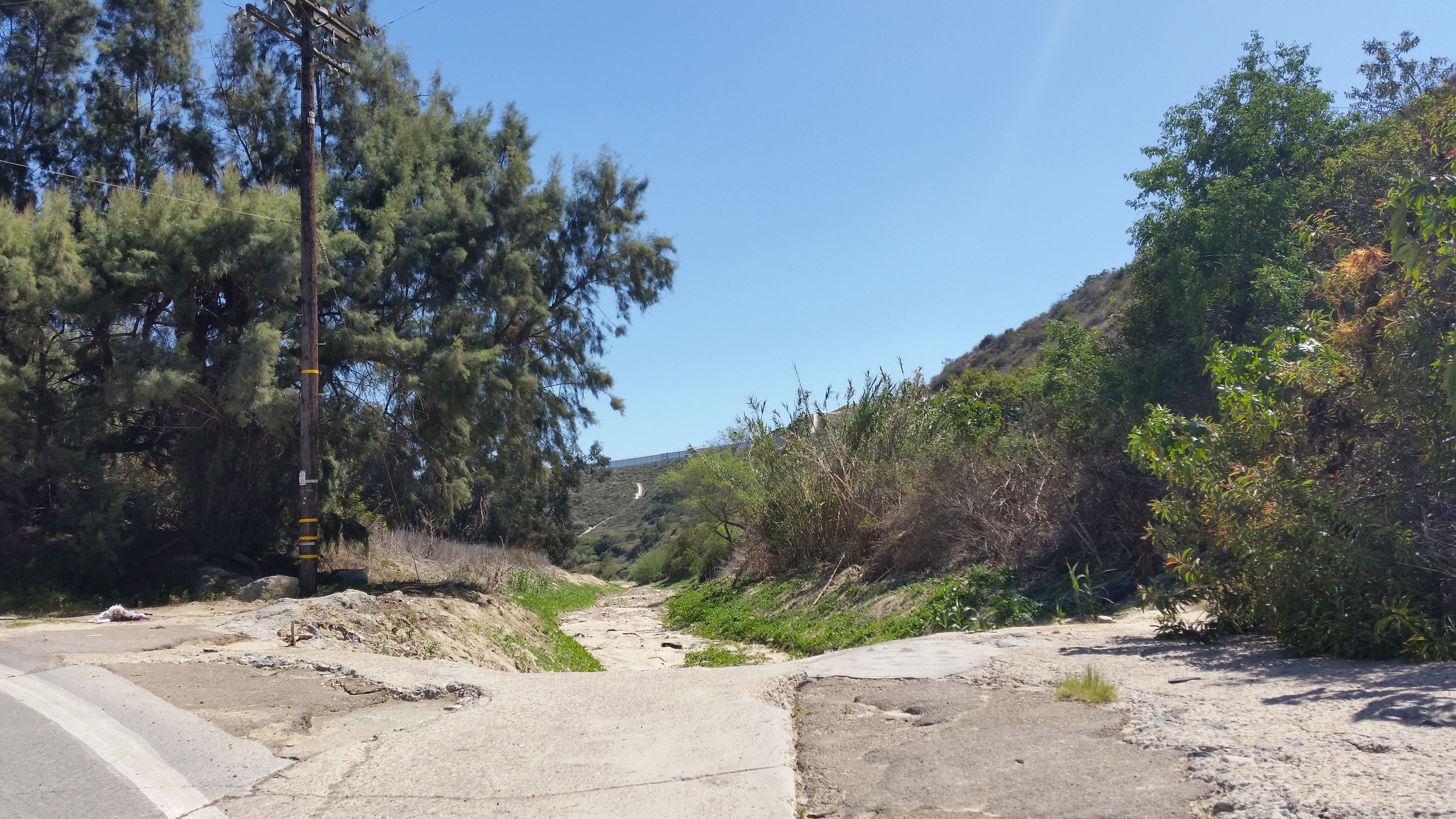
- Looking south within Smuggler's Gulch from Monument Road

- Location within the United States
- Floor elevation: 11 m (36 ft)

Geography
- Location: Tijuana River Watershed
- Population centers: Tijuana River Valley, San Diego
- Coordinates: 32.5447789°N 117.0883610°W
- Traversed by: Mexico–United States barrier
- Interactive map of Smuggler's Gulch

The Smuggler's Gulch is part of a steep walled canyon about 2 miles (3.2 km) inland of the Pacific Ocean. The canyon crosses the Mexico–United States border, between Tijuana, Baja California, and San Diego, California, and Smuggler's Gulch is the part of the canyon on the US side of the border. It may also be called Cañón del Matadero or Valle Montezuma in Spanish, but these names apply more generally to the whole canyon. Smuggling activities within Smuggler's Gulch have occurred since the 19th century, giving this part of the canyon its name.

The gulch is vegetated with coastal sage scrub and is home to threatened and special concern bird species. It has a seasonal stream, and normal flow is diverted for treatment. During the late 19th and early 20th centuries, agriculture occurred in the gulch, but was largely abandoned by the late 20th century. In the late 20th century, the gulch was used by illegal immigrants when crossing from Mexico into the United States, being described as a "prime route" during that period. Beginning in the 1980s, sewage flowing through the gulch entered into the Tijuana River, contributing to water contamination; since then mitigation efforts have been undertaken, but are defeated by rainfall. Since 2009, it has been partially filled and traversed by the Mexico–United States barrier.

== Flora and fauna ==
The flora of the gulch consists of coastal sage scrub. In the early 20th century, golden-spined cereus (Bergerocactus emoryi), listed by the California Native Plant Society as a rare plant, existed within the gulch. In 2015, a small number of singlewhorl burrobrush (Ambrosia monogyra), also listed as a rare plant by the California Native Plant Society, were documented near the mouth of the gulch.

Near and in the gulch, a few threatened and special concern species have been observed. These include the coastal California gnatcatcher (Polioptila californica californica), Cooper’s Hawk (Accipter cooperii), and the northern harrier (Circus hudsonius). Over 350 avian species have been observed near and within the gulch.

== Geography ==
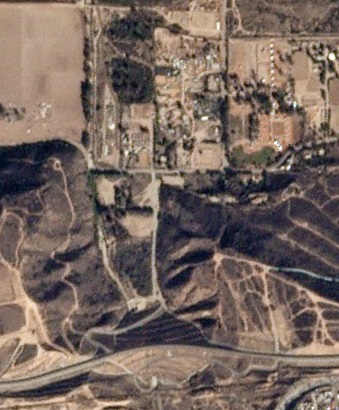
Satellite image of Smuggler's Gulch in November 2016

The gulch is the lower part of a steep walled canyon about 2 miles (3.2 km) inland and east of the Pacific Ocean in San Diego, California, and Tijuana, Baja California. The gulch is about 0.5 miles (0.80 km) wide. It is about 3 miles (4.8 km) west of the San Ysidro Port of Entry; the primary border crossing between San Diego and Tijuana, and the busiest border crossing in the world.

In the mid-19th century, Smuggler's Gulch had marshland and ponds of water. A stream which originates from the gulch had drained into the Tijuana River; the watershed of the gulch, a sub-watershed of the larger Tijuana River watershed, is about 6.7 square miles (17 km^{2}) and is mostly in Mexico. The stream only flows seasonally during the winter months. When the base flow is absent, sewage from Mexico would follow the path of the creek were it not diverted for treatment. An alluvial fan has formed at the northern mouth of the gulch due to colluvium deposits. A natural spring had existed within the gulch. In the early 1990s, the stream was funneled into a 20-foot-wide (6.1 m) agricultural channel which flows into the Tijuana River. This channel is connected to the gulch via an earthen channel which ends at Monument Road.

== History ==
Dating back thousands of years before the arrival of Europeans in the Americas, the Kumeyaay lived in the area in and around the gulch. Melijo, a Kumeyaay village, existed north of the gulch. (Note: Site CA-SDI-10669 was first recorded by Florence Shipek in 1976 as a possible location of the ethnographically-recorded Kumeyaay village of Mellejo. Since that time, an assortment of surface and subsurface discoveries has been attributed to CA-SDI-10669, resulting in the documentation of an extensive shell and lithic scatter by Seth Rosenberg in 2008. — Master Storm Water System Maintenance Program – Tijuana River Valley Channel Maintenance Project Individual Historical Assessment Unfortunately, the predominance of mottled deposits including modern trash intermixed with elements of the prehistoric occupation of the area indicated that this portion of Site CA-SDI-10669 did not retain integrity. — Master Storm Water System Maintenance Program – Tijuana River Valley Channel Maintenance Project Individual Historical Assessment) In 1769, Junípero Serra described the village as a "gentile settlement, thickly populated". Some of its inhabitants took part in the 1775 attack on Mission San Diego de Alcalá. Some time after the attack during the 18th Century, the people of the village were displaced.

During the Mexican period, the gulch was part of Rancho Melijo. It was owned by Santiago Argüello, who used it to raise cattle and horses. Following the Mexican–American War, monuments were placed along the Mexico–United States border; monument 256 was placed near the gulch. The canyon began to be referred to as Smuggler's Gulch as far back as the 1880s due to smuggling of livestock from Mexico into the United States. Other items smuggled through the gulch were cigars and lace undergarments. In 1889, a schoolhouse was built near the mouth of the gulch and continued to operate until 1941; prior to its closing, it had been the southwest most school in the United States. As of 2015, the former schoolhouse still exists as a private residence and had moved from its original location onto private property.

In the early 20th Century, prior to the American entry into World War II, about a dozen families settled within the gulch; they included the Satterlee, Welcome, Smallcomb, Brehlmeier, and Coones families, with most involved in agriculture. After World War II, mining occurred within the gulch. By the 1970s, significant croplands which had existed with the Tijuana River Valley began to be abandoned, with the exception of those near the mouths of the gulch and nearby Goat Canyon. Beginning in the 1970s, contaminated water began to flow through the gulch due to uncontrolled development that occurred as Tijuana began to grow into the gulch south of the border; farming within Smuggler's Gulch began to become unfeasible due to sewage contamination of the farmland. In the 1980s, tens of thousands of people illegally immigrating into the United States passed through the gulch and were subject to rape and robbery by criminals who targeted them; over the next decade, the gulch continued to be a common route for smuggling of illegal immigrants into the United States. National Geographic referred to the gulch as the "prime route" for illegal entry into the United States during the 1990s. At the height of its utilization for illegal entry into the United States, more than 10% of the 1.2 million apprehended illegal aliens were captured within the gulch. In May 1992, Pat Buchanan visited Smuggler's Gulch as part of his presidential campaign and delivered a news conference where he spoke out against illegal immigration and in favor of increased border security. In addition to news reporters and Buchanan supporters, the event was also witnessed by a number of migrants and neo-Nazis led by Tom Metzger.

Due to the sewage flowing through Smuggler's Gulch, Border Field State Park was quarantined. Beginning in the latter half of the 1980s, work began to collect sewage flows within the gulch but was insufficient to capture all of it, with over 100,000 US gallons (380 kL) continuing into the estuary every day in 1987. In the 1990s, the City of San Diego purchased land at the mouth of the gulch and utilized it as a toxic waste dump, importing contaminated soils from Sorrento Valley. By the mid-1990s, millions of gallons of sewage were flowing through the gulch, leading to additional attempts to mitigate the issue by construction of additional pumps and pipes to the then-newly constructed International Boundary Wastewater Treatment Plant; however, when it rains these pumps are insufficient to collect the polluted waters from Tijuana, which then flow into the Tijuana River and thence into the Pacific Ocean. As a result, the ocean adjacent to Imperial Beach is frequently closed to swimming because of bacterial contamination in the water.

=== Barrier construction ===
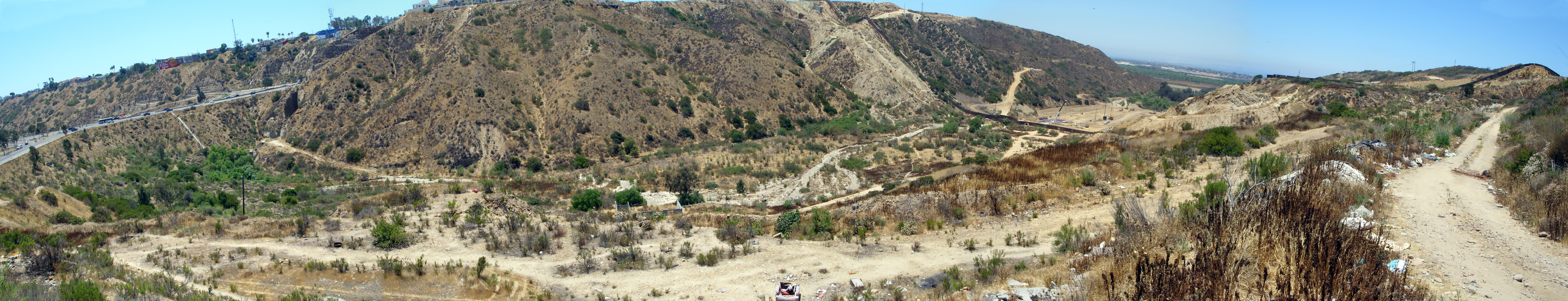
Cañón del Matadero south of the Mexico–United States border, as seen from the southeast, in 2008

Construction of a border fence by the United States Border Patrol, made of corrugated landing strips, in the area of Smuggler's Gulch began in 1990, and was completed in 1993; (Note: In 2005, it continued to be the only border fence in Smuggler's Gulch.) this fence was not opposed by environmentalist, as it reduced trampling of habitat and egg consumption by illegal aliens. In 1996, the United States Congress approved construction of double fencing from the Pacific Ocean to 14 miles (23 km) inland along the Mexico–United States Border. Due to this apprehension of illegal immigrants were significantly reduced, and shifted where illegal entry occurred to places without double fencing, including Smuggler's Gulch. In 2002, a Border Patrol agent died when her vehicle toppled down the gulch's steep slopes; this was one of four deaths that were attributed to narrow switchback roads which existed on the canyon walls. (Note: Due to the maintenance and safety issues, switchback alternatives to barrier construction were not seriously considered.) In February 2004, the California Coastal Commission halted construction of the Mexico–United States barrier, asking the United States federal government to make additional environmental concessions in regards to border barrier construction; this action was criticized in The American Spectator. Beginning in 2005, environmental laws were waived, as authorized by the Real ID Act, in order for the Mexico–United States barrier to be built in the gulch and in nearby Goat Canyon. These proposed actions were criticized by various people and organizations, including the Sierra Club. In 2005, 127,000 illegal aliens were apprehended in the area of Smuggler's Gulch, overcoming the existing fencing. In August 2008, barrier construction in the gulch began; work was contracted to Kiewit Corporation.

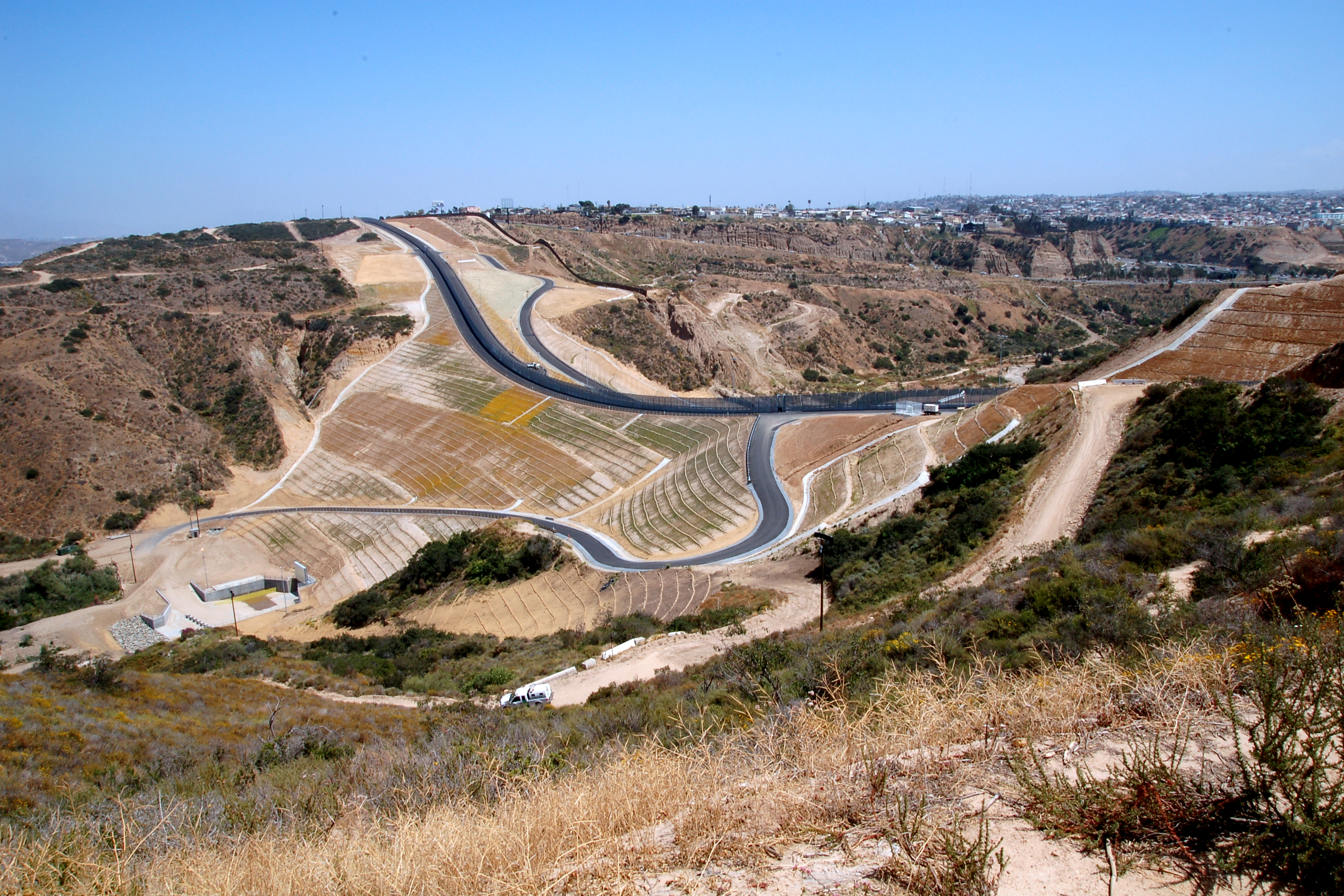
Mexico–United States barrier in Smuggler's Gulch, as seen from the northwest, in 2009

In July 2009, work was completed on the project in the gulch; it cost $58 million and utilized 72,000 dump truck loads to fill the 230-foot-high (70 m) gulch. The amount of dirt moved was about 2,100,000 cubic feet (59,000 m^{3}); the dirt came from nearby mesas within Border Field State Park. (Note: The dirt came from Border Highlands and Spooner's Mesa.) The 3.5-mile-long (5.6 km) road, lighting, and triple barrier, topped the fill within Smuggler's Gulch. The filling of the gulch was one of the most expensive sections of the Mexico–United States barrier.

In 2010, irrigation was installed on the fill to encourage growth of vegetation to reduce erosion, which would assist in stabilizing the earthen fill. Beginning in October 2011, native vegetation began to be installed by United States Customs and Border Protection (CBP) in order to rehabilitate areas affected by the installation of the border barrier across the gulch; this has stabilized the fill, which has seen reduction of height change from 0.5 centimetres (3/16 in) per year, to 0.1 centimetres (1/32 in) per year, all but eliminating sedimentation. After the barrier was completed in the gulch the area has been described as "nearly impenetrable"; however, even with these alterations to the terrain, it has not stopped all smuggling. As recently as June 2019, a small number of people have continued to evade CBP agents within the gulch. Due to the decrease in people crossing the border in the gulch, sensitive areas in the Tijuana River Estuary are no longer trampled upon.

At the base of the filled portion of the gulch, underneath the border barrier, are two 10-by-10-foot (3 m × 3 m) culverts to allow water flow. Following the construction of the border barrier in the gulch, a water channel was created to allow water from the gulch to flow into the Tijuana River; this channel is dredged and excavated yearly to remove trash, debris, and sands, which clog the channel. These items that are removed, originating from Tijuana, are waste from various sources, including hospitals and home construction. A sediment basin was built in the gulch in 2006; when the basins are emptied about 15,000 cubic yards (11,000 m^{3}) of trash and sediment are removed. Removed sediment is deposited in a former quarry located in the Tijuana River Valley.

As of October 2015, the gulch south of Monument Road and north of the Mexico–United States barrier is owned by the County of San Diego. The gulch between the Mexico–United States barrier, and the Mexico–United States border, are federal lands.

In the Summer of 2022, a 42 inches (110 cm) sewer line in the Mexican side of the canyon broke, causing the sewage it was caring to flow through the canyon into the Tijuana River; it was repaired in December 2023. Due to the flow of sewage into the Tijuana River beaches in South San Diego County were considered unsafe for human usage due to high bacteria levels. The County of San Diego declared a state of emergency due to the increase of sewage flowing from Mexico into the Tijuana River, however the State of California did not declare a state of emergency at the state level.
