= Goat Canyon (Tijuana River Valley) =

Canyon in the Mexican state of Baja California and the US state of California

- Cañón de los Laureles
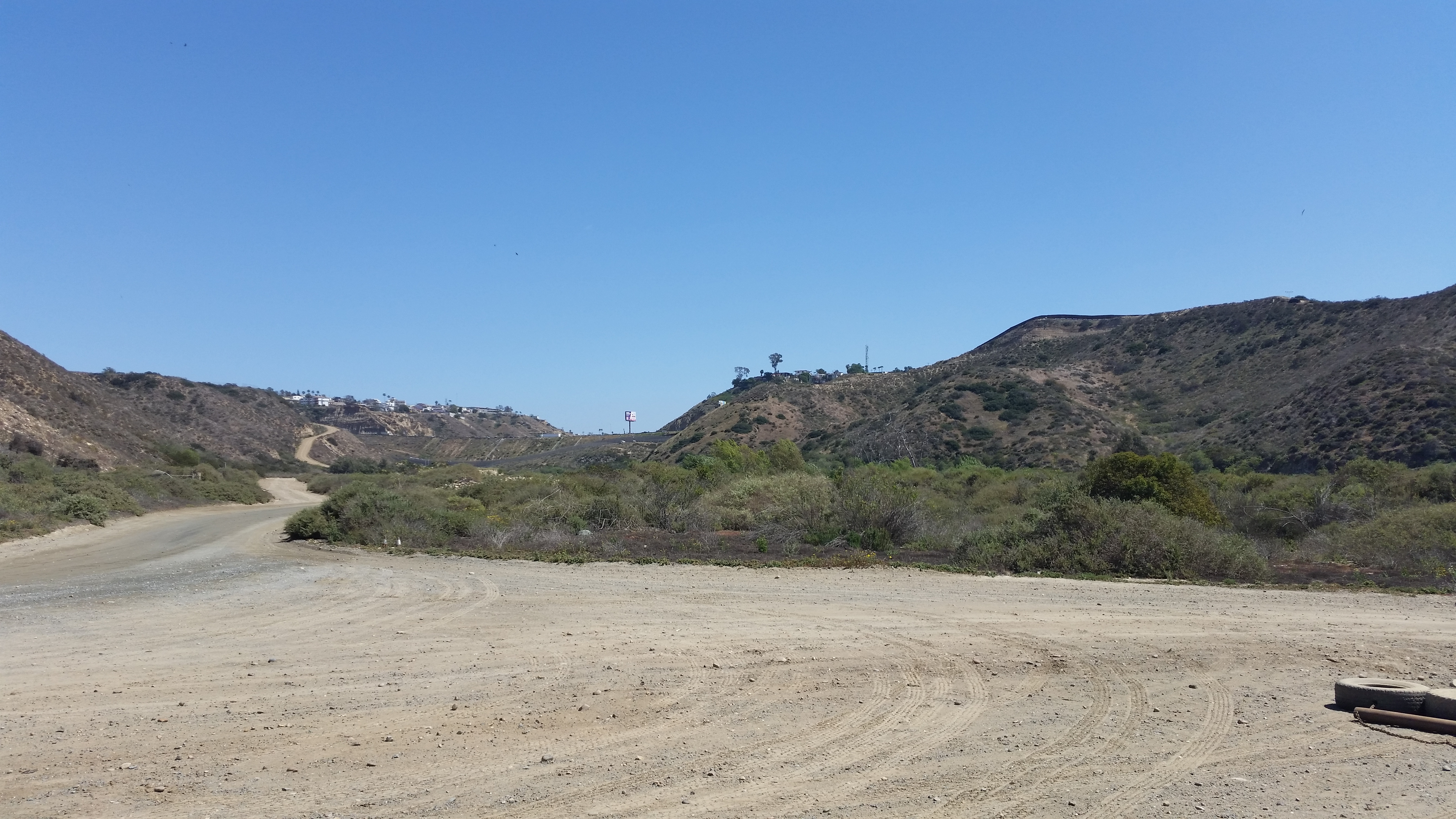
- Looking south-southeast within Goat Canyon

- Location within North America
- Area: 4.6 sq mi (12 km^{2})

Geography
- Location: Tijuana River Watershed
- Population centers: Playas de Tijuana; Tijuana River Valley, San Diego
- Borders on: Spooner's Mesa; Bunker Hill
- Coordinates: 32.5367°N 117.0994°W
- Traversed by: Mexico–United States barrier Mexican Federal Highway 1D
- Interactive map of Goat Canyon

Goat Canyon (Spanish: Cañón de los Laureles) also known as Cañón de los Laureles, begins in Tijuana, Mexico, and ends in the United States just north of the Mexico–U.S. border. The canyon is formed by Goat Canyon Creek, which receives water and other runoff from areas south of the border. Most of the canyon and its watershed lies within Baja California.

The canyon originated during the Quaternary period; it is bordered by Bunker Hill to its west and Spooner's Mesa to its east. Part of the canyon contains coastal salt marshland and supports numerous sensitive and endangered species.

Human activity in and around the canyon pre-dates European colonization; it was part of a route used by the Portolá expedition to San Diego Bay and later formed part of the Missionary Road, which was abandoned in the late 19th century. Farms existed in and around Goat Canyon until the area came under the control of the federal government of the United States. Development south of the Tijuana-Ensenada scenic highway began in the late 20th century, causing sewage to flow northward, a problem that persisted into the 21st century.

== Geography ==
Rocks that form the walls of Goat Canyon are relatively young, being no older than 10,000 years; they were formed in the Quaternary period. The west wall of the canyon is about 5,000 m (16,000 ft) from the ocean. The eastern wall of the canyon consists of a slope that leads to Spooner's Mesa, which was named after a couple who had a homestead atop it.

== Flora and fauna ==
Numerous sensitive (Note: In this context, sensitive is defined as those species listed be a federal, state, or local agency for management. In addition special interest groups may also list a species as sensitive. These sensitive species may include former endangered or threatened species.) and endangered plant species including the southern willow, mule fat, maritime succulent scrub varieties; and endangered animals including least Bell's vireo, Belding's savannah sparrow, and California gnatcatcher are found within Goat Canyon. Within the northern portion of the canyon is an environment categorized as southern coastal salt marsh, which supports some of these species.

== History ==
The earliest-known site of human activity in Goat Canyon is a prehistoric campsite with a shell midden. In the area surrounding the canyon, evidence of human activity relating to the San Dieguito and La Jollan prehistoric cultures has been found. Within the canyon there is a San Dieguito-era quarry. In 1769, the Portolá expedition's overland group, with which Junípero Serra was traveling, traversed Goat Canyon on their way to San Diego Bay.

In the 1770s, Spaniards recorded that a Native American village, which they named "Milejo", was located at the mouth of the canyon. In 1775, members of the Kumeyaay people living in the Tijuana River Valley, of which Goat Canyon forms the southwestern portion, attacked Mission San Diego de Alcalá, which Serra had helped found several years previously. During the attack, Friar Luis Jayme was murdered; he is considered to be the first Catholic martyr in Alta California. During the period when the canyon was within Alta California, it was part of Rancho Tía Juana in 1829. By 1833, the canyon was part of Rancho Melijo.

Sometime after the end of the Mexican–American War in 1848 the land between Imperial Beach and Monument Mesa was owned by Elisha Babcock, who went on to develop Coronado. The land was passed to James Crafton, one of the owners of the Agua Caliente Casino and Hotel, around the time of the Great Depression. Prior to 1872, the original El Camino Real alignment ran north from Goat Canyon. In the late 1880s, with the completion of the National City and Otay Railway between San Diego and Tijuana, a city was planned for the area north of the westernmost border monument but this plan was never implemented .

In the early 20th century, a homestead consisting of a house and a farm was built; the homestead was occupied until the 1980s when it was condemned by the city of San Diego. It operated as a dairy farm and was owned by Harley E. Knox, who was a mayor of San Diego. It remained in the ownership of the Knox Family until at least 1981 but was out of their control due to government control beginning in 1970. While the early 20th-century structures are no longer present, an excavation found evidence of a prehistoric camp on the site of the homestead. The camp shows evidence that local materials had been processed into tools, as indicated by two alluvial deposits; in 2002 it was recommended that this site be placed on the National Register of Historic Places. There was also a pig farm in the canyon; in the 1940s it was run by a Mexican family. The father of the family died during the construction of a well at the farm. The ruins of the home at the pig farm still existed in 2001.

=== United States government activity ===
United States military activity near Goat Canyon began to the west with the surveying of a border marker. Activity then moved eastward to delineate the border established in the Treaty of Guadalupe Hidalgo that traversed the canyon. A marker, boundary monument #257, was placed atop the hill west of Goat Canyon. Beginning in 1909, the Bureau of Animal Industry began to build a fence at the international border to inhibit the movement of tick-infested cattle that transmitted Texas Fever; the fence was supplemented by patrols on horseback. A temporary United States Army outpost was established during the Mexican Revolution (1910–1920) but a more significant Navy presence was established in the late 1920s with the creation of an airfield known as Border Field. In 1943, on the south side of the base near the canyon, 35 buildings, including a trap house, were built close to Monument Road to support military operations at the airfield.

In 1935, a survey of existing defenses led to planning for an expansion of coastal defenses for San Diego Bay. In 1942, the United States Army base end stations were constructed on the hill west of the canyon; the group of bunkers was named "Mexican Border Fire Control Station". In 1943, a fire control radar was installed at the Mexican Border Fire Control Station. The bunkers assisted targeting for Coastal Artillery batteries at Fort Rosecrans and Fort Emory. In 1951, a plane crashed at the airfield, leading to the end of its use as an aerial gunnery range. In 1953, the United States Army transferred control of the Mexican Border Fire Control Station to the United States Navy, which placed it under the control of the airfield. Border Field airfield was itself under the control of Naval Auxiliary Air Station Imperial Beach.

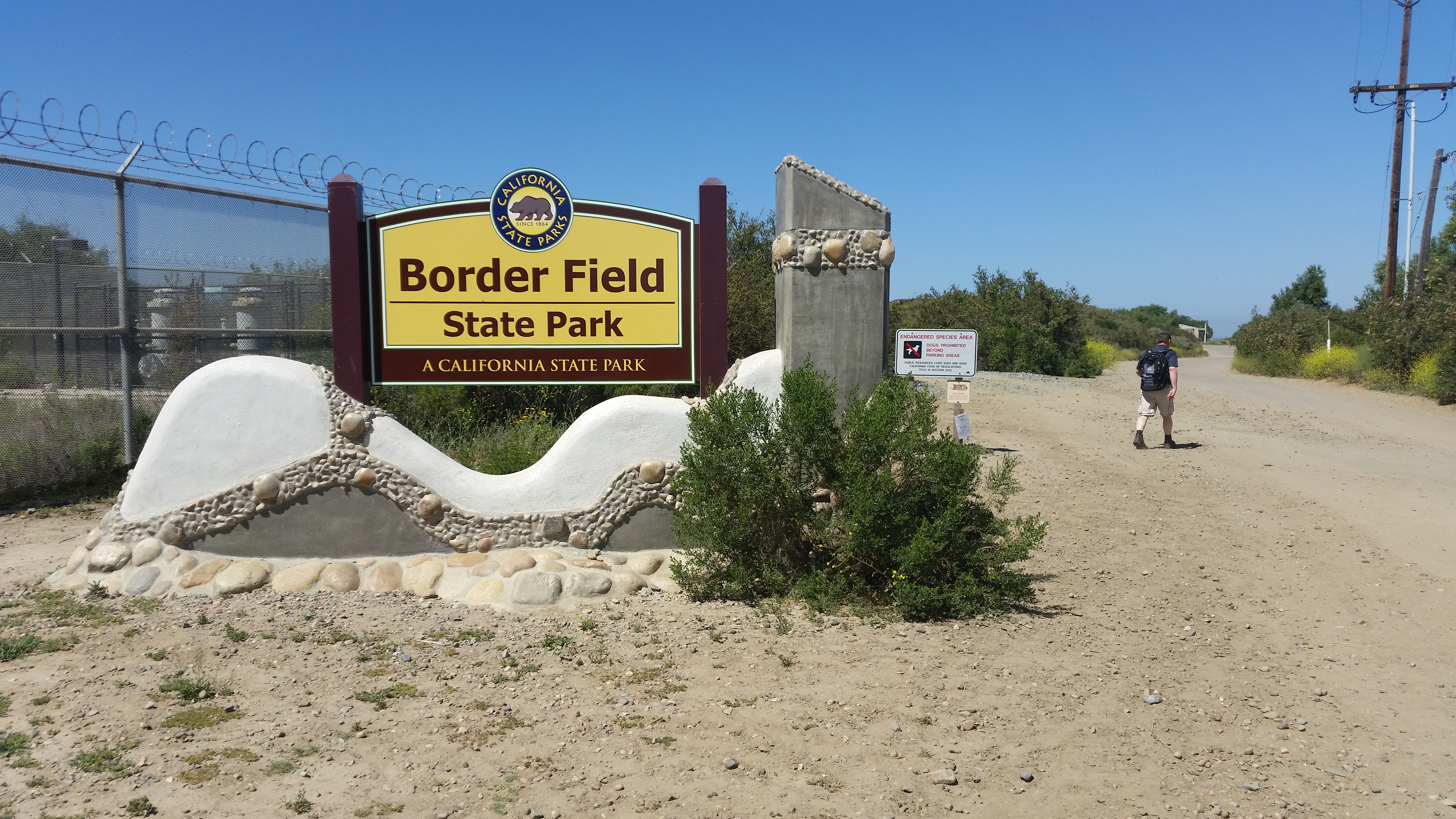
Monument Road entrance to Border Field State Park, north of the mouth of Goat Canyon

In 1961, Border Field and Goat Canyon were given to the Navy Electronics Laboratory. Other users of the area were the California National Guard—which had launched pilot-less drones in the decade prior—and the Imperial Beach Police Department, which had a shooting range on the land. At the time, a renewed effort to build a city in the area was made; these plans never materialized. By 1971, the United States Navy transferred the site to the State of California, which opened Border Field State Park. Sometime between 1981 and 1998, a border road used by the United States Border Patrol was constructed on the eastern wall of the canyon leading up to Spooner's Mesa; the construction destroyed a Paleolithic site and adobe ruins. Since 2009, the bunkers atop Bunker Hill are no longer publicly accessible because the Federal Government reacquired the land for construction of the Mexico–United States barrier.

In late April 2018, some members of the Central American migrant caravan were contacted by American authorities while illegally entering the United States in the canyon. They were prosecuted, while three people from India who were also contacted by American authorities around that time were processed for asylum.

=== Cañón de los Laureles development and impact ===
In 1960, Tijuana Ensenada highway was constructed through the canyon, just south of the Mexico–United States border. The construction of the highway and a concrete channel in the canyon on the Mexican side led to people moving into Cañón de los Laureles in an unplanned manner. In 1981, Goat Canyon was not a significant contributor to the 300,000 US gallons (1,100 kilolitres) of sewage flowing into the Tijuana River. In 1983, due to sewage spills that originated in Goat Canyon, the installation of a pump was proposed. Once installed, the pump, which handles flow from Smuggler's Gulch and Goat Canyon, was able to pump as much as 7,000,000 US gallons (26,000 kilolitres) a day. In 1990, 110,000 US gallons (420 kilolitres) of sewage per day originated from the canyon and flowed into the Tijuana River. By 1998, areas of low-income housing that were prone to damage during flash floods caused by seasonal rains had been built in the canyon. In 2001, a pipeline intended to send sewage from the canyon to the International Boundary Wastewater Treatment Plant was installed. Treated water from this plant is pumped to a location over 18,000 ft (5,500 m) offshore through a pipe that passes deeper than 100 ft (30 m) below the northern mouth of Goat Canyon.

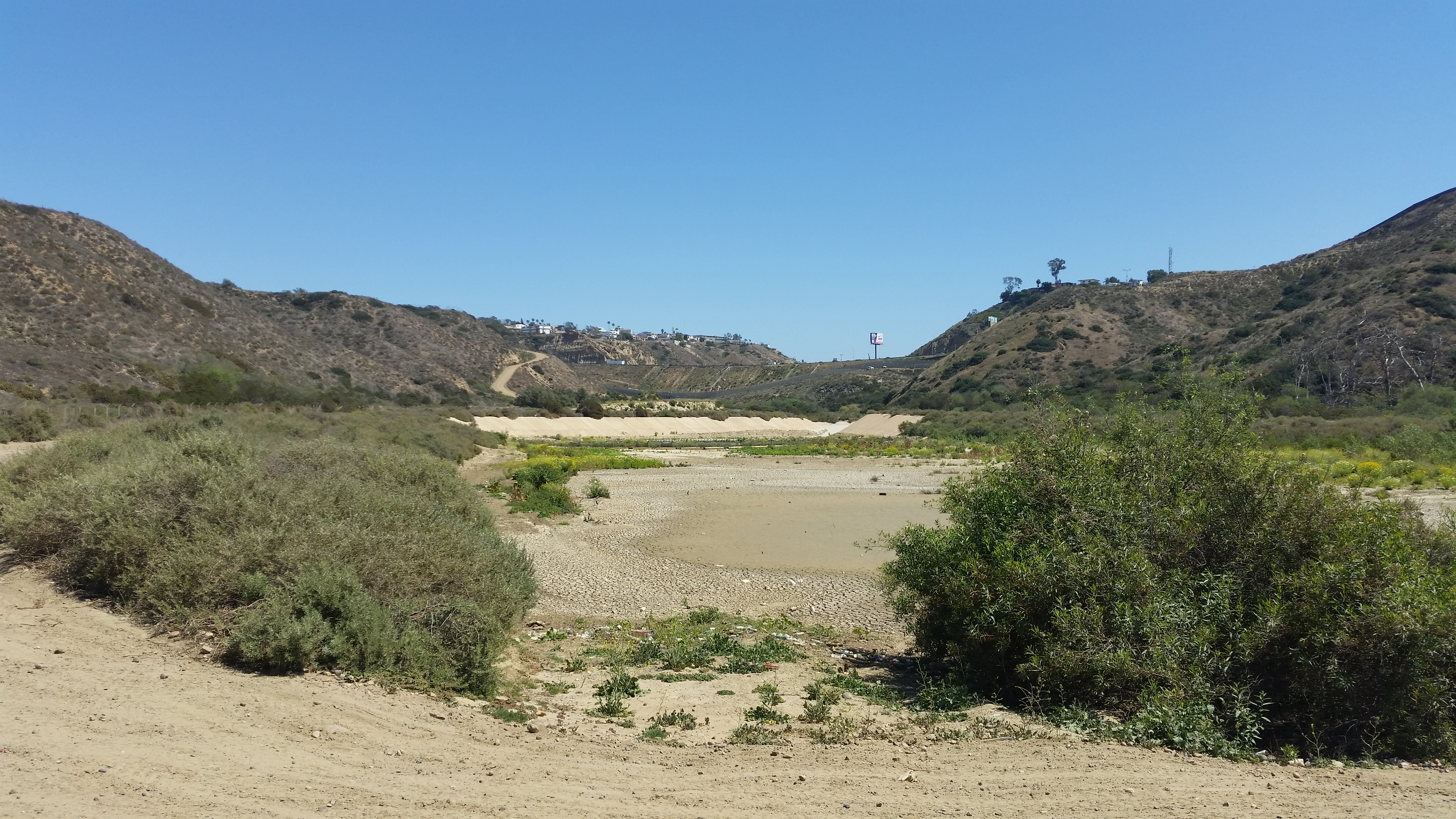
Sediment Basin located on the floor of Goat Canyon.

A sediment basin was constructed at the mouth of the canyon in 2005 because significant amounts of material originating from south of the border were deposited in the Tijuana River Estuary, leading to loss of habitat. The yearly cost of emptying the sediment basin is between US$250,000 and over US$1,000,000. By 2009, over 65,000 people lived in the Mexican portion of the canyon, part of which is Colonia San Bernardo. By 2014, the population in the Mexican portion of the canyon had grown to 85,000; the housing was described as a "shanty town". Even with the pipeline and later upgrades to the International Boundary Wastewater Treatment Plant, sewage still flows into Goat Canyon.

In 2010, with the construction of the Mexico–United States barrier, diverts were installed to assist with the flow of water through the canyon; in addition a 40 yards (37 m) long drainage culvert was installed underneath the barrier. In 2012, labor-intensive trash nets were used to catch debris so it would not embed in the sediment. Also in 2012, a $50,000 program to reduce erosion was conducted on the Mexican side of the canyon. By 2014, environmentalists were able to create a recognized watershed council; this gave the area political representation with the aim of increasing the infrastructure within the Mexican portion of the canyon.

In March 2017, black water flowed from the Mexican side of the canyon into the sediment basins; in previous month the water that came through was red. Wastewater from upstream of the canyon was reported by United States Border Patrol agents in May 2017, leading to complaints about health concerns that joined bipartisan concerns from politicians such as Darrell Issa and Juan Vargas about wastewater from Mexico impacting the Tijuana River. In 2017, funding for border wastewater projects was removed from the U.S. budget. In October 2017, the amount of fecal indicator bacteria was found to be in above-average concentrations. In February 2018, more than 50,000 US gallons (190 kilolitres) of waste—including sewage—flowed through the Goat Canyon pump station and spilled into the Tijuana River. In May 2018, the Surfrider Foundation released a report about pollution in the Tijuana River, and Goat Canyon in particular, showing E. coli levels were significantly greater than standard levels; the water that flows through Goat Canyon have been described as some of the worst that flow from Tijuana. In January 2019, the catch basins were called a "success story of sorts".
