= Tijuana River =

River in Baja California and California

Tijuana River Spanish: Río Tijuana
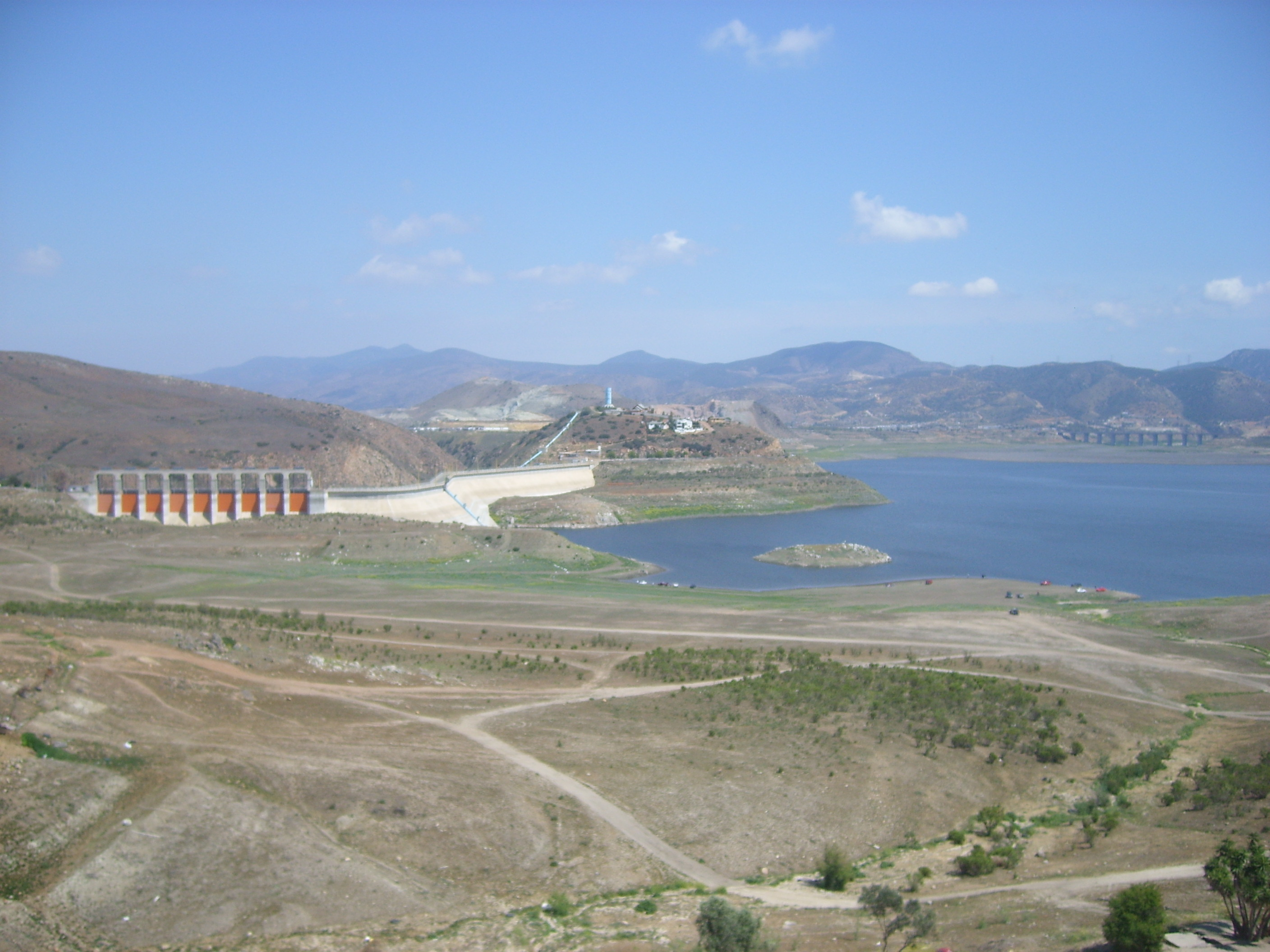
- Dam on the Tijuana River in Mexico.

- Map of the Tijuana River basin

Location
- Country: Mexico, United States
- State: Baja California, California
- District: San Diego County (California)
- Municipalities: Ensenada, Tijuana, Tecate, San Ysidro (Baja California)

Physical characteristics
- Source: Sierra de Juárez
  - location: Municipality of Ensenada
  - elevation: 614 ft (187 m)
- Mouth: Pacific Ocean
  - location: Imperial Beach
  - coordinates: 32°33′06″N 117°07′38″W
  - elevation: 0 ft (0 m)
- Length: 120 mi (190 km)
- Basin size: 1,750 sq mi (4,500 km^{2})
- Discharge
  - location: Tijuana Slough National Wildlife Refuge
  - average: 42.5 cu ft/s (1.20 m^{3}/s)
  - minimum: 0 cu ft/s (0 m^{3}/s)
  - maximum: 33,500 cu ft/s (950 m^{3}/s)

Basin features
- Tributaries
  - left: Arroyo de las Palmas

The Tijuana River (Spanish: Río Tijuana) is an intermittent river, 120 mi (195 km) long, near the Pacific coast of western Baja California state in northwestern Mexico and Southern California in the western United States. The lower reaches of the river are heavily polluted with raw sewage from the city of Tijuana, Mexico.

== Location ==
The Tijuana River drains an area along the U.S.–Mexico border, flowing through Mexico for most its course then crossing the border into Southern California for its lower 5 mi (8 km) to empty into the ocean at the Tijuana River Estuary on the southern edge of San Diego. The region straddles the Mediterranean climate and semi-arid climate zones, so the Tijuana River and its tributaries often go dry in times of drought.

The Tijuana River has two main tributaries. One, the Arroyo de Alamar or Rio Alamar, runs in its upper reaches in the United States as Cottonwood Creek. It runs from its source in the Laguna Mountains southwestward where it is impounded by two dams, Barrett and Morena, to supply water to the city of San Diego. Cottonwood Creek is joined by Tecate Creek before it enters Mexico where it is known as the Arroyo de Alamar from the point where it enters Mexico to its confluence with the larger tributary, the Arroyo de las Palmas, that forms the headwaters of the Tijuana River within the city.

The Arroyo de las Palmas, the main tributary of the Tijuana River, flows out of the mountains to the east into the reservoir behind the Abelardo L. Rodríguez Dam. Downstream from the Rodríguez Dam, water flows through Tijuana in a concrete channel to the international border; there it continues west through the Tijuana River Valley for a distance of about nine miles to the estuary and then to the Pacific Ocean.

Its lower reaches provide the last undeveloped coast wetlands in San Diego County amidst a highly urbanized environment at the southern city limits of Imperial Beach. The river has been the subject of great concern regarding pollution, flood control, and U.S. border protection.

== Description ==
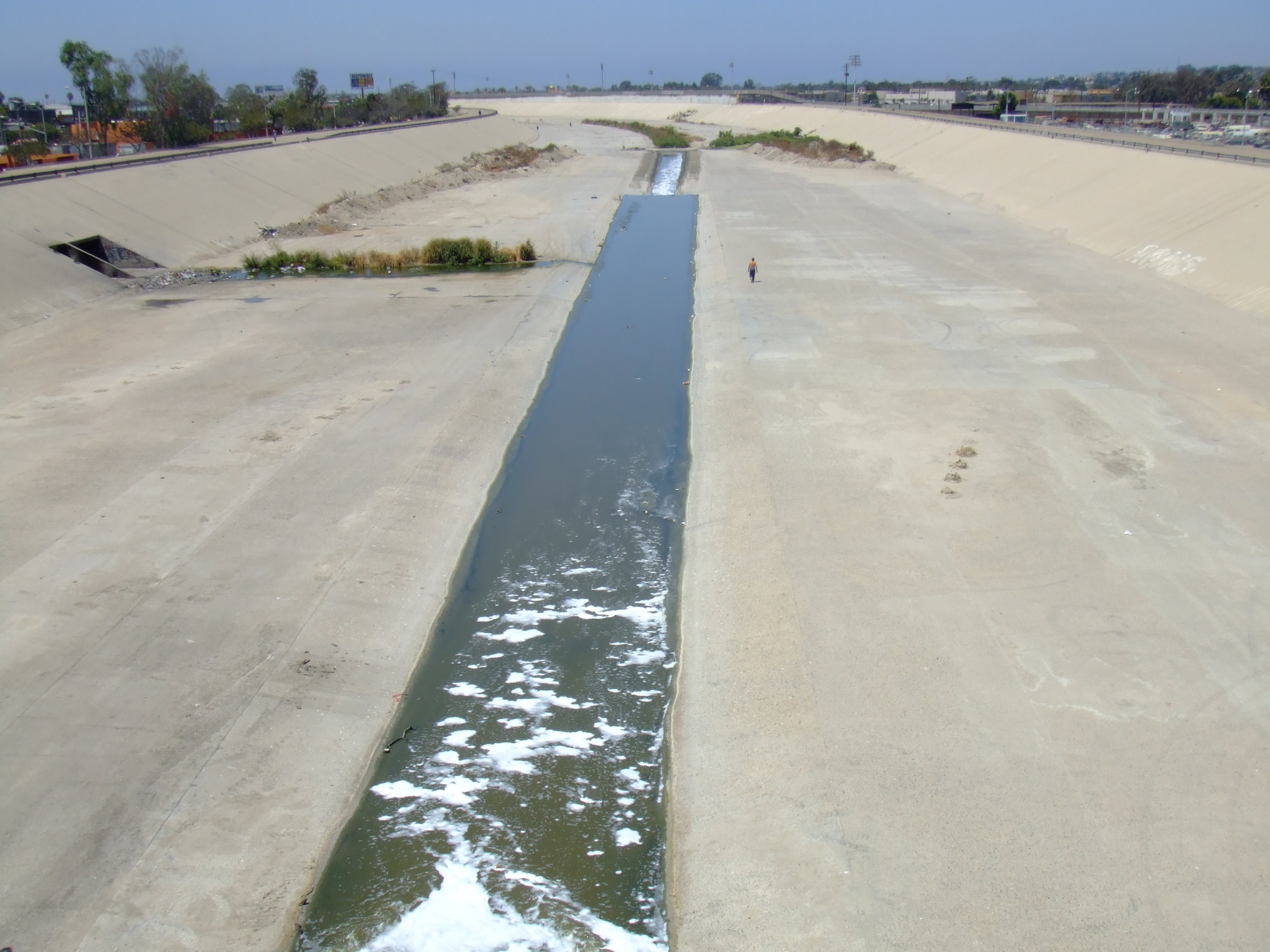
Tijuana River seen from a pedestrian bridge in Tijuana (Mexico).

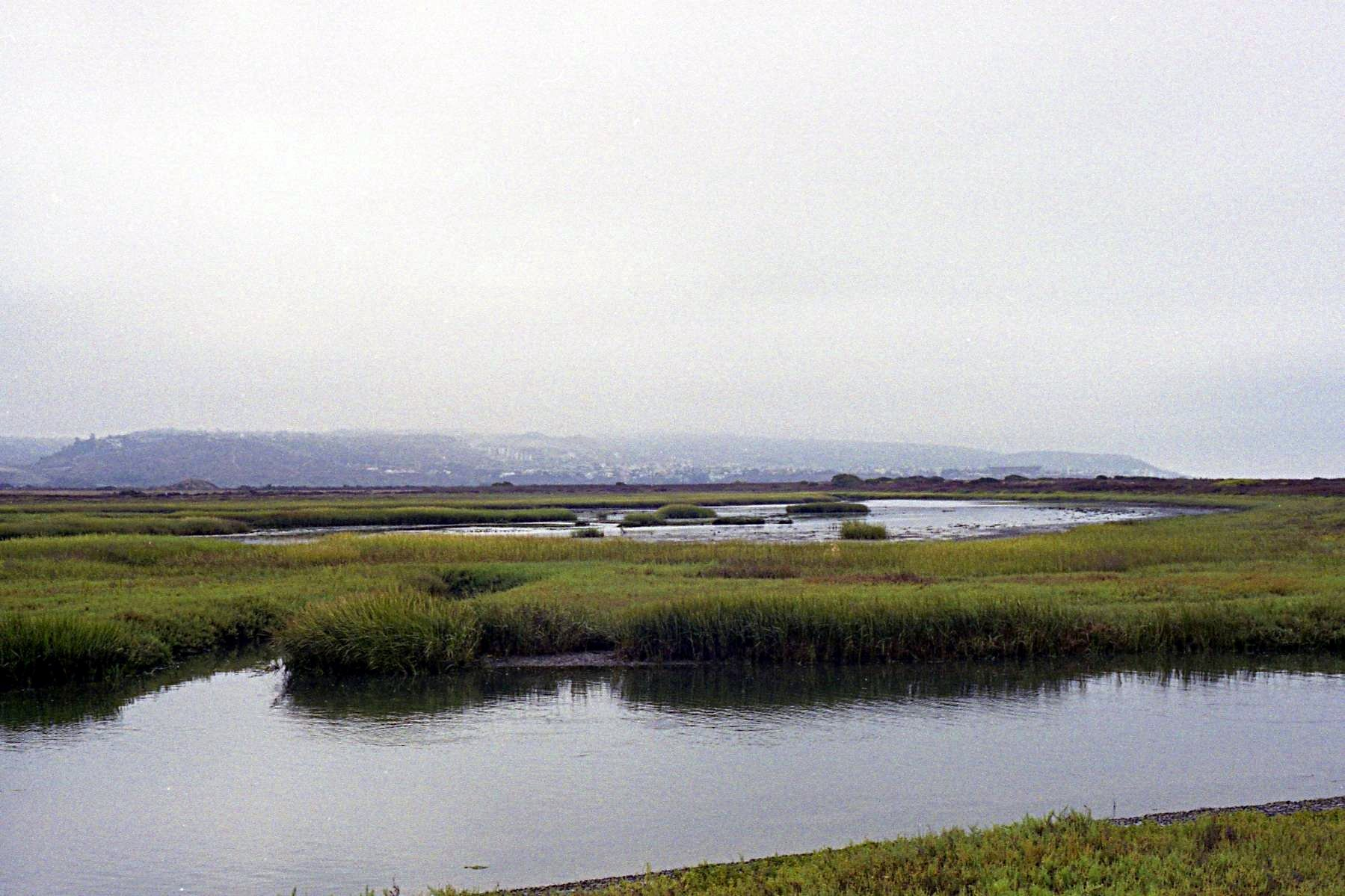
The Tijuana River Estuary.

The Tijuana River rises in the Sierra de Juárez of northern Baja California, approximately 45 mi (70 km) ENE of Ensenada. It flows WNW through Tijuana, crossing the border approximately 5 mi (8 km) from the Pacific. It flows west, just skirting the international border south of the San Ysidro section of San Diego. The lower 2 mi (3 km) of the river form the broad mud flat estuary, and the Tijuana River Estuary is a rich habitat for wildlife, including over 370 species of birds; one of these species is the Ridgway's rail. It is Southern California's largest coastal wetland. It is naturally prone to flooding during heavy rains. The Tijuana River enters the Pacific 10 mi (15 km) south of downtown San Diego at the southern city limits of Imperial Beach.

The river is an intermittent river, flowing naturally only during rains. The river is impounded in Mexico southeast of Tijuana by the Abelardo L. Rodríguez Dam for drinking water and irrigation. Former Baja California Governor Milton Castellanos Everardo constructed concrete barriers along the riverbank to prevent flooding during his tenure. The United States was supposed to build a complementary system of barriers to ensure flooding waters didn't flow back into Mexico, but instead adopted a dissipator flood control plan under the direction of the San Diego City Council, supported by ecologists, which preserved the estuary, which was then designated a wildlife sanctuary.

The majority of its watershed is within Mexico, between Mesa de Otay to the east, and hills to the west.

== Conservation ==
=== Flooding ===
Flooding in the Tijuana River had been a concern for both the United States and Mexico because it would lead to sewage runoff and would ultimately cause property damage to the surrounding area. In 1944, the United States-Mexico Water Treaty was signed, this dealt with "utilization of waters in the Colorado and Tijuana rivers and of the Rio Grande." This treaty appointed the International Boundary and Water Commission to handle several issues such as border sanitation. The IBWC went on to create the Tijuana River Flood Control Project in 1966 in order to create a flood control channels along the river. Mexico had completely complied by 1976 while the U.S. implementation stalled due to opposition at the local level. Despite preventive measures, flooding in 1980 caused 11 deaths and property damage in bordering cities. Flooding due to high rainfall and sewage blockage continues to be a concern that endangers surrounding areas because of the wastewater pollution found in the river.

=== Nature reserves ===
The Tijuana River National Estuarine Research Reserve protects 2,293 acres (928 ha) and studies the Tijuana River Estuary. It was established as part of the National Estuarine Research Reserve system in the United States. The reserve is managed in part as a Biological Field Station by the San Diego State University (SDSU) College of Sciences, which also protects part of the estuary near the ocean within the United States.

The Tijuana Slough National Wildlife Refuge is part of the San Diego National Wildlife Refuge Complex, and is also within the Estuarine Research Reserve. The Tijuana Slough Refuge protects one of southern California's largest remaining salt marshes without a road or railroad trestle running through it. Designated as a Globally Important Bird Area by the American Bird Conservancy, over 370 species of birds have been sighted on the refuge. Salmon have been recorded in the past in the river during runs.

== Wastewater ==
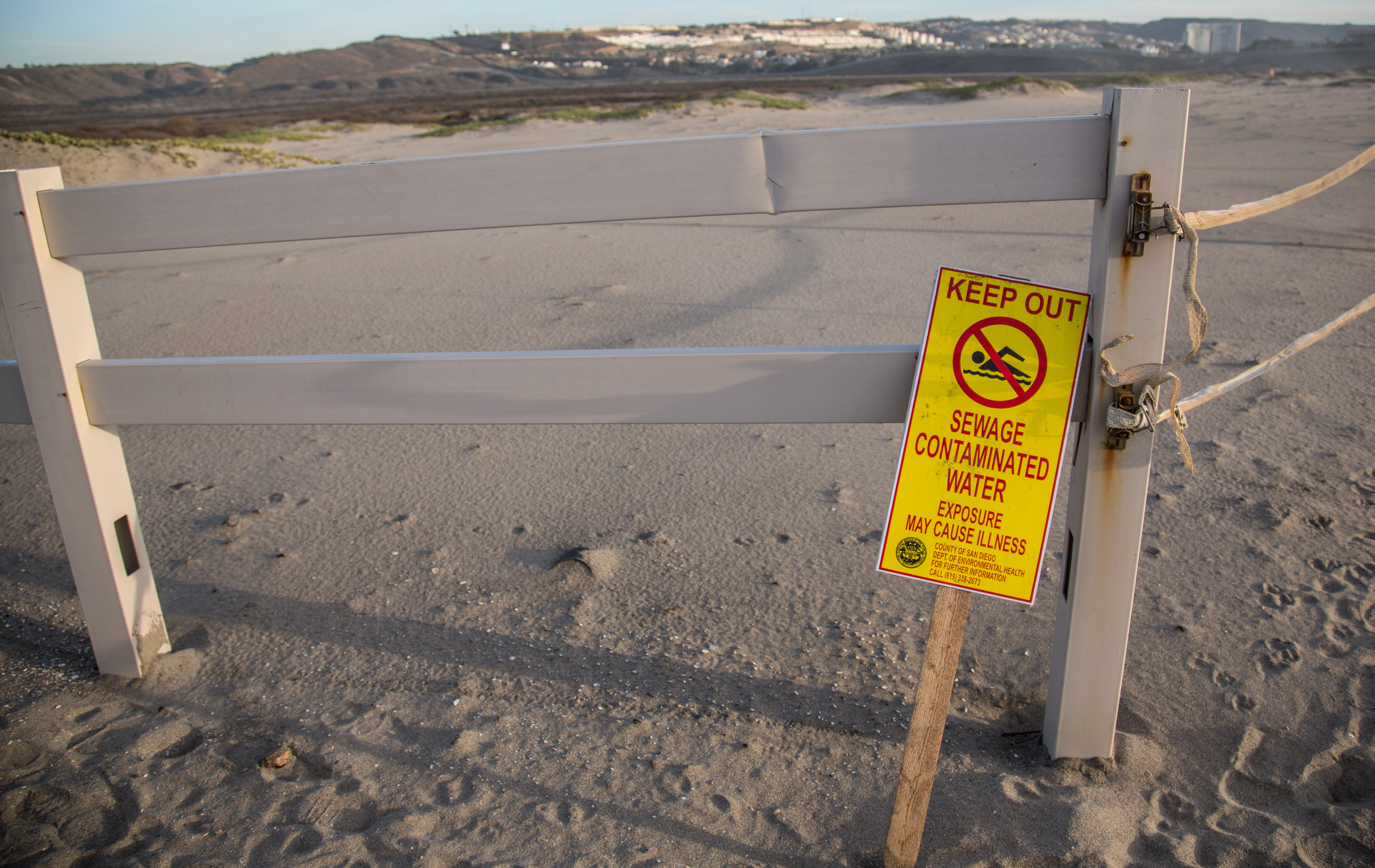
Warning sign at Border Field State Park in December 2014

The river has been used as a wastewater conduit since at least the early 20th century. Raw-sewage overflows on the Mexican side, from canyons along the river, are a recurring problem despite cross-border efforts to clean it up. In fact, they are the main source of pollution. In addition to sewage, trash is carried downstream causing damage to vegetation and contributing to flooding.

The first attempt to deal with sewage flowing into the Tijuana River was the creation of the International Outfall, a marine outfall, which was completed in 1939, but was proven to be inadequate as early as the late 1940s. By the 1950s, there were over 4 million gallons of sewage flowing into the river each day. Following a threat by the San Diego County's health officer, Mexico began to treat its sewage with chlorine. Usage of the outfall ended in 1962 due to the completion of a pumping plant, which discharged untreated sewage into the Pacific Ocean; the pumping plant broke down in 1975. In the 1960s an emergency link from Tijuana into the San Diego Water System was created, by the mid-1980s it was taking in about 15 million gallons a day of sewage. During the 1970s, up to ten million gallons of sewage entered the river each day from Tijuana.

In 1980, Brian Bilbray, as Mayor of Imperial Beach, dammed the river with a skip loader to block the flow of sewage crossing the border. Partial progress was made in the 1980s with a Clean Water Grant from the U.S. Environmental Protection Agency to improve wastewater treatment, by creating the San Diego-Tijuana Wastewater Treatment Plant to protect estuary waters. In 1988, the river was found to be the most polluted river on the Mexico–United States border. In April 1990, the U.S. Environmental Protection Agency found lead and mercury in the waters of the Tijuana River watershed that exceeded multiple times U.S. standards, prompting fears of outbreaks of malaria and encephalitis. That same year in 1990, Mexico agreed to pay $41 million of the $192 million to construct the plant. The plant was completed in 1997. Water from the plant is discharged more than three miles offshore, but does not meet levels required by the Clean Water Act due to the lack of secondary treatment. Finished in January 2011, the plant received a $93 million upgrade. Other sewage that would have flowed into the Tijuana river is treated at the Punta Banderas treatment plant; it handles 30 million gallons of sewage a day. However, its discharge doesn't meet Mexican water standards, sometimes causing closure of beaches as far north as Coronado.

Since 1993, the City of San Diego has renewed a state of emergency for the Tijuana River Valley due to ongoing issues with the Tijuana River. According to a 1993 report by the city of San Diego, the city had collected an average of 13 million gallons (50 million liters) per day of raw sewage, that then was treated by the Point Loma wastewater treatment plant; this is down from 20 million gallons per day in 1997 being treated by the city of San Diego, which it had received from Tijuana. Since 1998 the U.S. EPA has funded $42 million on sewage projects in Tijuana. In 2014, the San Diego Reader described the river as one of the most polluted parts of San Diego, with the beaches near the mouth of the river closed for 204 days in 2013. In 2015, the amount of sewage treated on a dry day remained the same, at 13 million gallons. However, when it rains, the amount of sewage can increase to 27 million gallons per day, and the pump which funnels water to the treatment plant is shut off so it isn't overcome. Even when the flow is low, toxins, metals, solvents, pathogens, and sewage, end up becoming dust that can be breathed in and cause medical problems.

In January 2017, the Punta Banderas treatment plant, officially known as San Antonio de los Buenos plant, treated 15 million gallons of sewage a day to standards below U.S. secondary-level standards, pumping the water out into the Pacific Ocean at La Playa. Yet, in 2017, it was found by Proyecto Fronterizo de Educacion Ambiental that the release from the plant exceeded Mexico's minimum federal standards on bacterial levels. While Tijuana's sewage capture rate of 90% exceeds the Mexican national average of 50%, Roberto Espinosa of CILA is quoted as saying "Tijuana is a complex city, and it has a sanitary system that has never kept pace with the increase in population,". Due to the sewage in the river, it has been called "one of the most polluted waterways in the country". This has led to a multitude of beach closures in Imperial Beach. Each year the beach at Border Field State Park is closed for 233 days.

In February 2017, over 143 million gallons of sewage entered the river, larger than the usual few million gallons of sewage that is routine. Later, the amount of was revised upwards to over 200 million gallons. However, a Mexican water official claimed the spill was only 30 million gallons. The spill is the largest to occur in over ten years. The sewage spill was not initially reported by Mexican officials, but was noticed by residents on the South Bay coast. The impact of the spill affected waters as far north as Coronado, and was described by Imperial Beach Mayor Serge Dedina as "a tsunami of sewage", and "deliberate". According to the International Boundary Water Commission, the sewage discharge was due to a repair of a sewer pipe near Rio Alamar. The sewage was first noticed in the middle of the month. Repairs of the sewer pipe were completed in late February 2017, but the exact dates when the sewage began and stopped entering the river were unknown as of March 2017, leading to calls for an investigation. By mid-March 2017, the California Department of Environmental Health found the water quality had returned to within health standards, opening beaches up to Coronado. In mid 2017, Border Patrol agents reported sewage flowing into the Tijuana River from Smuggler's Gulch, and Goat and Yogurt Canyons. In all of 2017, beaches near the Tijuana River were closed for 167 days.

In February 2018, following the shutting off of a CILA pump station, a 15 million gallon sewage spill entered the Tijuana River. In March 2018, Customs and Border Protection began to search for solutions to the sewage issue, after more than six dozen Border Patrol agents were negatively impacted by their contact with sewage in the Tijuana River Valley; this included taking water and soil samples to assess the contamination levels which exist in waters and areas around the Tijuana River watershed. In March 2018, a bi-partisan delegation of San Diego County's members of the United States House of Representatives wrote a letter to the Office of the Inspector General of the Department of State, to investigate cross-border sewage spills. In April 2018, an earthen berm was constructed at the border across the Tijuana River, to stop sewage from flowing into the United States. In July 2018, environmental groups from Mexico and the United States made a criminal complaint regarding dumping of sewage into the Tijuana River against the state of Baja California. For a week in December 2018, 6-7 million gallons of sewage flowed into the Tijuana River due to a failure of a sewage main in Tijuana.

In early 2019, following seasonal storms sewage from the Tijuana River flowed out of the Tijuana River Estuary, leading to beach closures in South Bay, San Diego. In February 2019, testing revealed significant pollutants flowing northward from Tijuana including DDT, hexavalent chromium, pathogens, and carcinogens. In March 2019, the continuing sewage issue was highlighted by a story appearing in Vice News, where it was referred to as an "environmental disaster". In mid 2019, it was proposed that all water flowing northward on the Tijuana River be diverted and processed at the San Diego-Tijuana Wastewater Treatment Plant. By late June, over 430,000,000 US gallons (1,600,000 kL) of sewage had spilled into the Tijuana River in 2019. In early September 2019, an additional 116,000,000 US gallons (440,000 kL) of contaminated water flowed into the Tijuana River, leading to continued beach closures. In early February 2020, over 100,000,000 US gallons (380,000 kL) of sewage flowed into the Tijuana River.

For decades citizens from both San Diego and Tijuana have fallen sick due to the sewage flowing into local beaches. The most recent data showed that over 34,000 people in 2017 got sickened by the pollution and sewage in Imperial Beach according to a study that a University of California San Diego professor did. An estimated 13 billion gallons of polluted water from the Tijuana River have entered the oceans since Dec. 28, 2022, according to a UCSD statement. For years, public health officials say they have sampled beach waters of south San Diego County for fecal microbes, getting counts as an indicator for pathogens such as enterococcus, E. Coli, salmonella and MRSA. Exposure to such germs and viruses may lead to diarrhea, vomiting, fever, headaches, respiratory illness, infections, rashes and meningitis. From 2018 to 2024, more than 100,000,000,000 US gallons (380,000,000 kL) of wastewater have flowed from Mexico into the United States via the Tijuana River according to the International Boundary and Water Commission.

=== 2018 lawsuits ===
In March 2018, due to sewage in the Tijuana River, Chula Vista, Imperial Beach, and the Port of San Diego sued the International Boundary and Water Commission. In response to the lawsuits, Mexico pledged $4.3 million towards Tijuana River cleanup; part of these funds will be used to replace deteriorating pipe in Tijuana that parallels the Tijuana River, which if it fails could release 4 million gallons of sewage a day into the river. In May 2018, California and the San Diego Regional Water Quality Control Board also created a lawsuit against the International Boundary and Water Commission for sewage in the Tijuana River. In July 2018, Surfrider Foundation made an additional lawsuit regarding sewage in the Tijuana River. In August 2018, Judge Jeffrey T. Miller ruled that lawsuits based on the Clean Water Act could proceed, but that lawsuits based on the Resource Conservation and Recovery Act would be dismissed. In January 2019, the City of San Diego joined the lawsuit against the International Boundary and Water Commission.

=== 21st-century water improvement agreements ===
Over 30 federal, local, state, private and other interested groups want to develop binational long-term goals to address wastewater treatment and debris-related improvements. One major initiative, introduced in the United States on March 16, 2015, was Resolution R902015-0035, a Five-Year Action Plan that aimed to implement restorative projects over the span of five years. The resolution was initially introduced by the Tijuana River Valley Recovery Team (TRVRT), whose ultimate goal is to progress and implement strategies originally introduced in January 2012, under the Tijuana River Valley Recovery Strategy regulatory measures. Other restorative measures across the U.S. include grants like the Community-based Marine Debris Removal Grant that brings organizations together in conjunction with community-based cleanups to remove trash and debris from the Tijuana River Valley. The debris removal grant began in 2014 and successfully removed over 400 tons of debris by 2016. A binational discussion on July 28, 2016, established upcoming proposed projects between the Border 2020 Tijuana River Watershed Task Force and the Tijuana River Valley Recovery Team. These discussions continue the national environmental resolutions agreement under the 1983 La Paz Agreement that acknowledges the environmental and social responsibility of each country near its border regions. Under this treaty, each country is under agreement to conserve, protect, and improve border regions for the overall well-being of the coinciding countries.

In 2020, the United States–Mexico–Canada Agreement was ratified providing $300,000,000 for abating water pollution in the Tijuana River. A significant amount of the money will be spent on improving the International Boundary Wastewater Treatment Plant. In addition, funding was increased to the North American Development Bank, to funding environmental projects elsewhere on the Mexico–United States border.

== Crime ==
The construction of the Mexico–United States barrier in the area around and crossing the Tijuana River, began with construction of a fence made of Marston Mat in 1989, followed by construction of a secondary fence beginning in 1996. Due to the fences, the amount of illegal entry into the United States along the border south of the Tijuana River has been significantly reduced.

During the Mexican drug war in June 2006, the severed heads of three Rosarito Beach police officers were found in the Tijuana River.

Areas of the Tijuana River canal are home to individuals described as "ñongo". In March 2015, a homeless encampment was removed from the Tijuana River canal, some of whom had previously been deported from the United States; a year later, some of those who had been removed from the Tijuana River canal had returned and began to live in tunnels which drain into the canal. Tijuana is a major resettling location for Mexicans deported from the United States, with some living on the Tijuana River canal. A 2016 study found that the Tijuana River Canal was a known site for where people inject drugs. In 2018, more than 20 bodies were found in or near the Tijuana River, on the Mexico side.

== Recreation ==
=== Parks ===
The Tijuana River Valley Regional Park is located in the Tijuana River Valley district of San Diego. It protects over 1,800 acres (730 ha), including dense riparian forests along the Tijuana River. It has an extensive system of trails for walking and equestrian access. In early 2019, construction of a campground within the regional park was approved at an expected cost of $8.3 million. As of April 2021, the campground is active and offers sites for tent campers, RVers, and yurts.

=== Surfing ===
The mouth of the Tijuana River is the location of the Tijuana Sloughs big-wave surfing break, which is a mile off shore. Winter waves can be as high as 12 feet or greater; 20-foot-high waves are not unknown to occur. Surfing has been occurring at the slough since at least 1937, when Allen Holder began to surf there. It has been described as the "gold standard" in Southern California, with surfers using it as a training ground for surf found in Hawaii. Surfing at the Tijuana Sloughs is written to be similar to surfing at Saunder's Reef.

Surfing at the sloughs has impacted the evolution of surfing culture, as well as regional culture. Lifeguards have watched over the area since 1939. Sewage from the river impacts water quality, which can lead to surfers becoming ill; one source describes that area as "virtually unsurfable due to pollution".

== See also ==
- List of rivers in California
- List of most-polluted rivers
