= Tijuana River Valley =

River valley on the US–Mexico border

Coordinates: 32°33′5″N 117°5′24″W

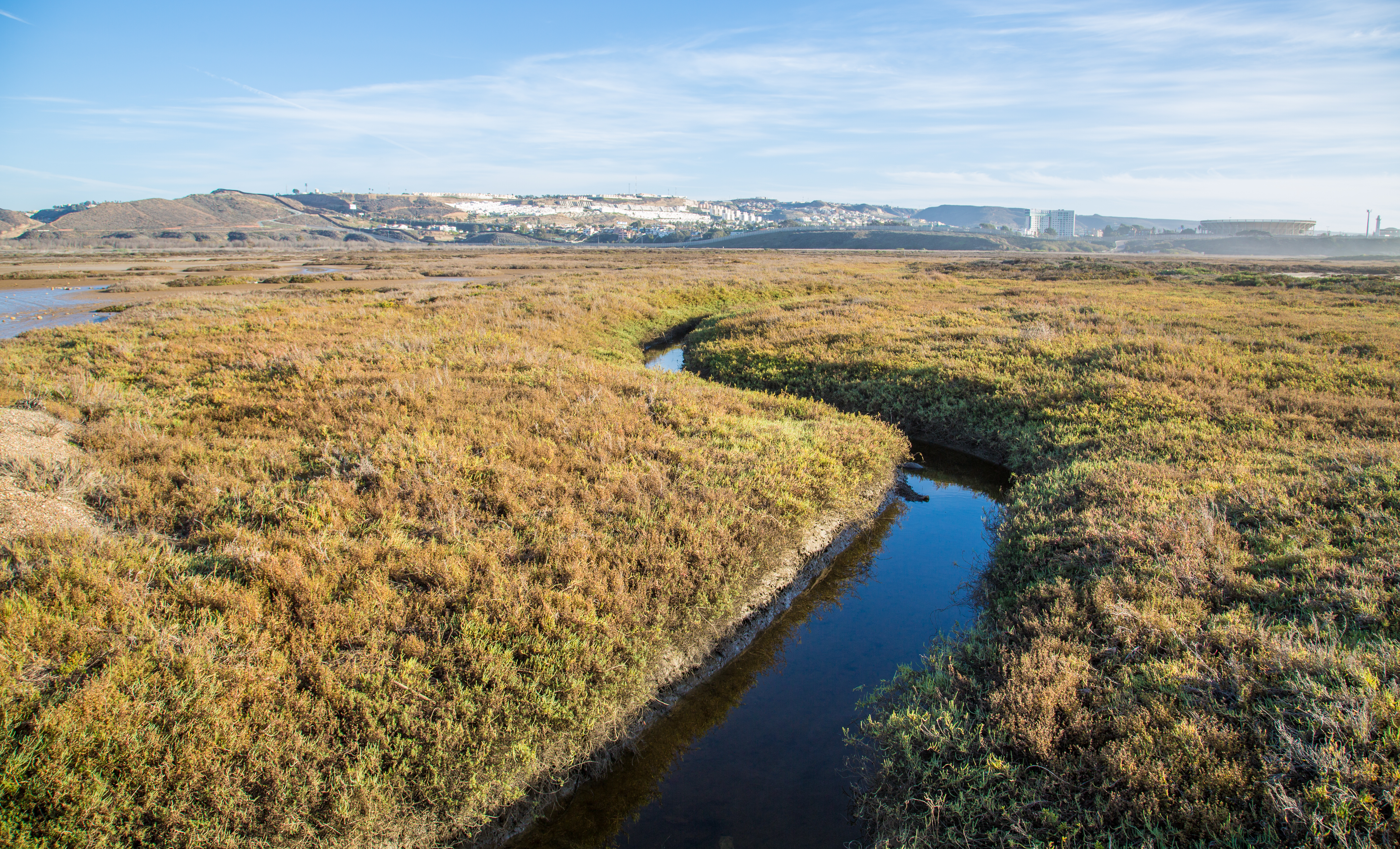
Tijuana River Valley at Border Field State Park

The Tijuana River Valley surrounds the lower Tijuana River from Tijuana, Baja California and runs across the United States–Mexico border into southwestern San Diego County, California. In California, the river crosses a broad coastal floodplain and reaches the Pacific Ocean through the Tijuana Estuary.

== Geography ==
In Mexico, the valley floor is narrower and the slopes on either side are steeper. The river runs through a concrete flood-control channel in Tijuana. On the California side, it passes through farmland and woodland. Tidal salt marsh lies near the river mouth. The inland floodplain also contains rural homes and equestrian facilities.

The city of San Diego uses the name Tijuana River Valley for a community planning area along the international border. The planning area lies south of Otay Mesa–Nestor and Imperial Beach and west of San Ysidro.

== History ==
Several pre-Hispanic Kumeyaay villages stood in the valley, including Melijo near Smuggler's Gulch. Later part of the valley belonged to Rancho Melijo, a land grant made to Santiago Emigdio Argüello in 1833.

Dairy ranches appeared in the early 20th century. A major flood destroyed much of the valley's cropland in 1916. Agriculture was back again between the late 1930s and the 1950s, but declined in the 1960s and 1970s due to groundwater shortage and soils becoming saltier, with additional contributions gfrom water diversions and urban development.

In 1957, San Diego's South Bay annexation extended the city to the international border. The San Diego City Council adopted a plan for the valley in 1976. A later coastal land-use plan prioritized habitat protection and restoration and allowed limited farming and recreation.

== Parks and conservation ==
The Tijuana River National Estuarine Research Reserve was established in 1982. It includes Border Field State Park at its southern end. Inland, the county's Tijuana River Valley Regional Park has 22.5 miles (36.2 km) of multi-use trails for hiking, cycling and horseback riding. It also has a campground and a community garden.

== Flooding and pollution ==
Floods can inundate much of the valley floor. Historically, they shifted the river channel and moved sediment across the floodplain. Untreated sewage and industrial wastewater are dumped into the rivers of the basin on the Mexican side and carry pollutants along with trash across the border. Dirty water reaches the ocean leading to frequent beach closures.

== Sources ==
- City of San Diego (March 2007). Tijuana River Valley Local Coastal Program Land Use Plan (PDF). City of San Diego.
- City of San Diego; Page & Turnbull (March 28, 2011). San Ysidro Historic Context Statement (PDF). City of San Diego.
- Rico, Benjamin; Barsanti, Kelley C.; Porter, William C.; Cysneiros de Carvalho, Karolina; Stigler-Granados, Paula; Prather, Kimberly A. (2025). "Heavily polluted Tijuana River drives regional air quality crisis" (PDF). Science. 389 (6763) eadv1343. doi:10.1126/science.adv1343.
- Safran, Samuel; Baumgarten, Sean; Beller, Erin; Crooks, Jeff; Grossinger, Robin; Lorda, Julio; Longcore, Travis; Bram, Danielle; Dark, Shawna; Stein, Eric; McIntosh, Tyler (January 2017). Tijuana River Valley Historical Ecology Investigation (PDF). SFEI-ASC Publication 760; SCCWRP Technical Report 967. Richmond, California: San Francisco Estuary Institute–Aquatic Science Center.
- Schoenherr, Steven (July 2015). "The Tijuana River Valley Historic Sites" (PDF). South Bay Historical Society Bulletin (9).
