= Tijuana River National Estuarine Research Reserve =

Natural reserve in Imperial Beach, California and San Ysidro, San Diego

Coordinates: 32°33′20″N 117°07′22″W

- IUCN category IV (habitat/species management area)
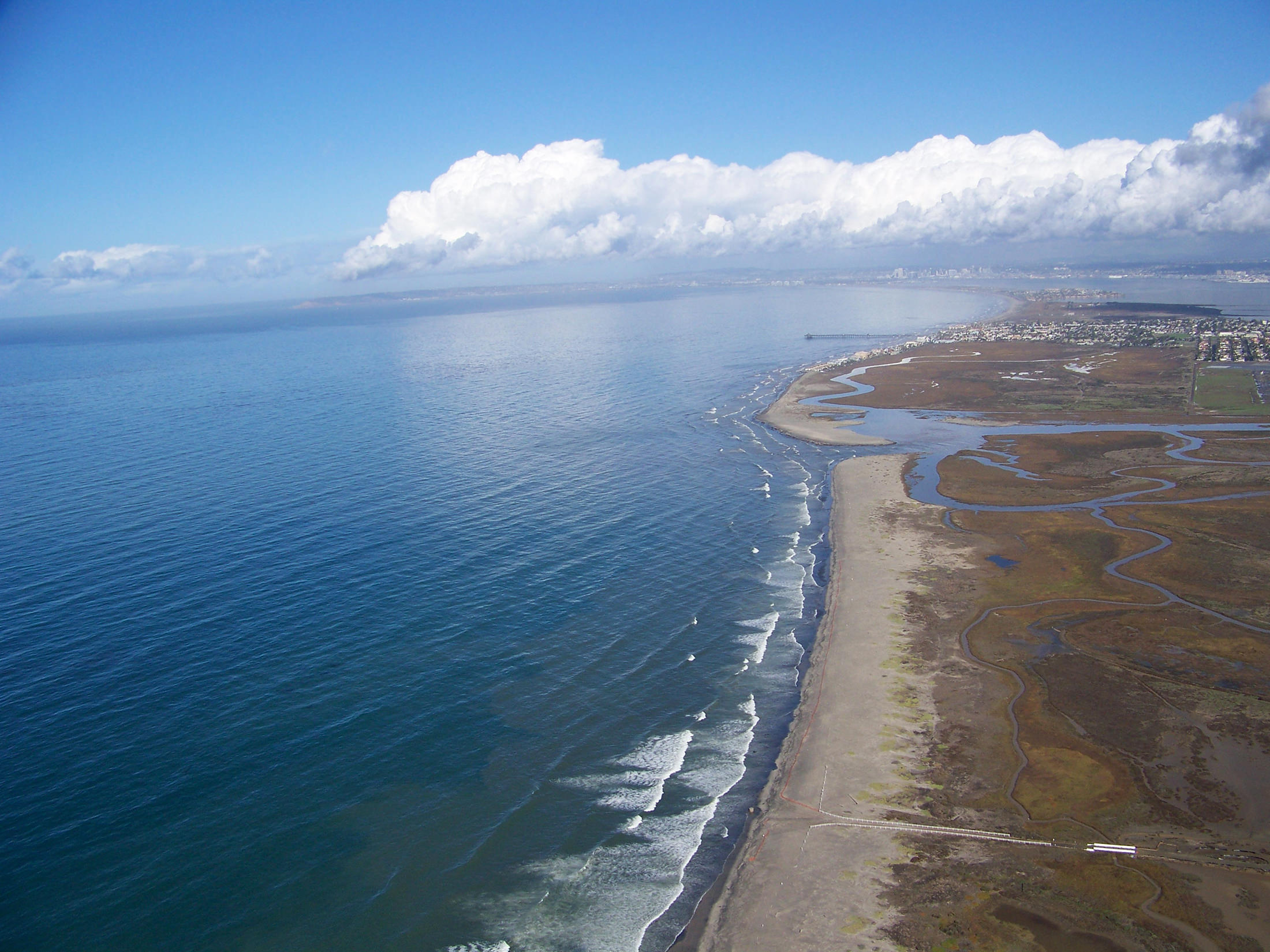
- Interactive map of Tijuana River National Estuarine Research Reserve
- Area: 9.45 km^{2} (3.65 sq mi)
- Established: 1982

Ramsar Wetland
- Official name: Tijuana River National Estuarine Research Reserve
- Designated: 2 February 2005
- Reference no.: 1452

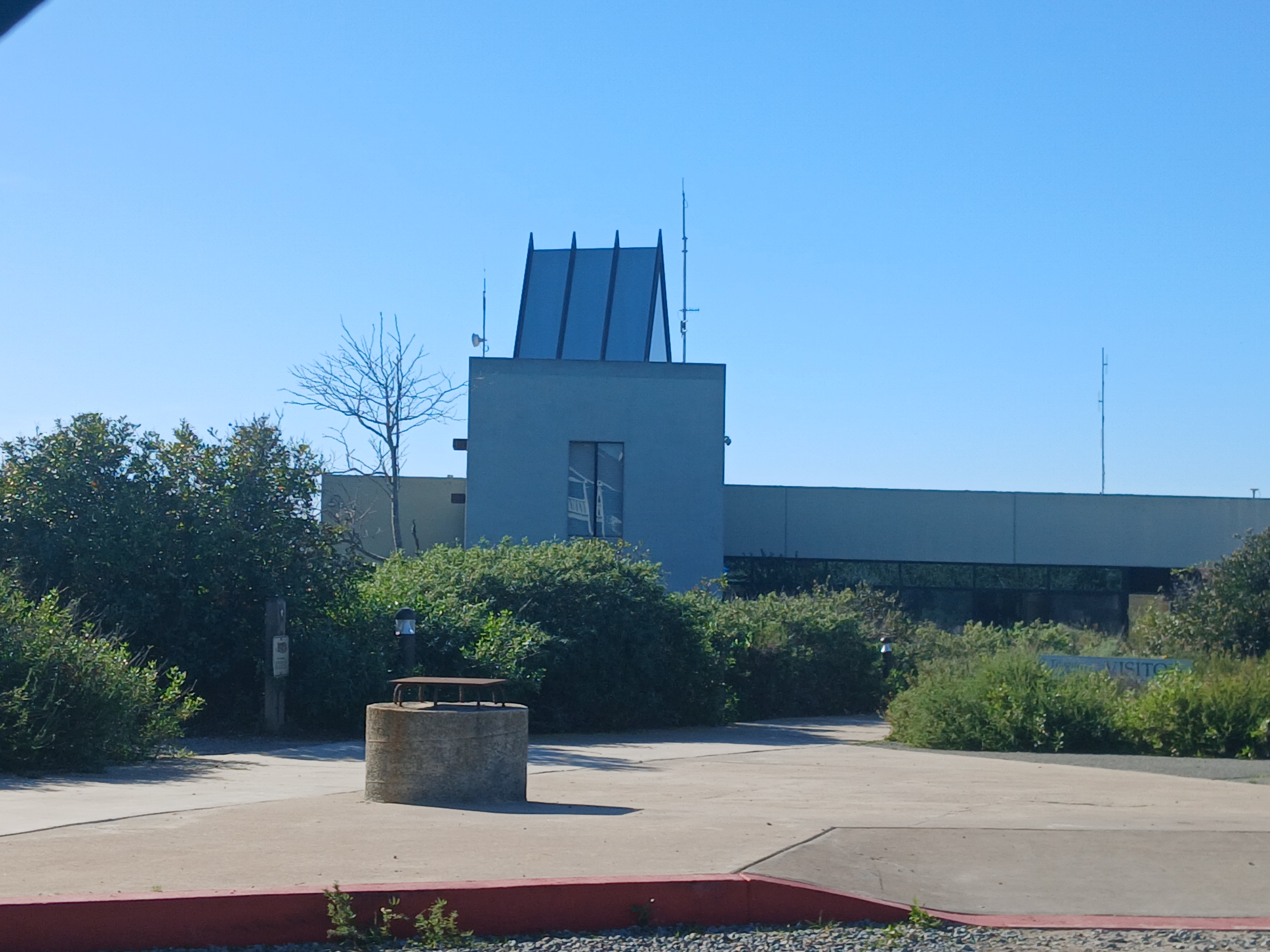
Visitor Center

Tijuana River National Estuarine Research Reserve is a natural reserve in Imperial Beach, California, and San Ysidro, San Diego. It encompasses the Tijuana River Estuary, located on the Mexico–United States border. It is divided into two primary parts: Tijuana Slough National Wildlife Refuge on the north, and Border Field State Park in the south, but several other also jurisdictions own land within the Reserve boundary.

== Access and features ==
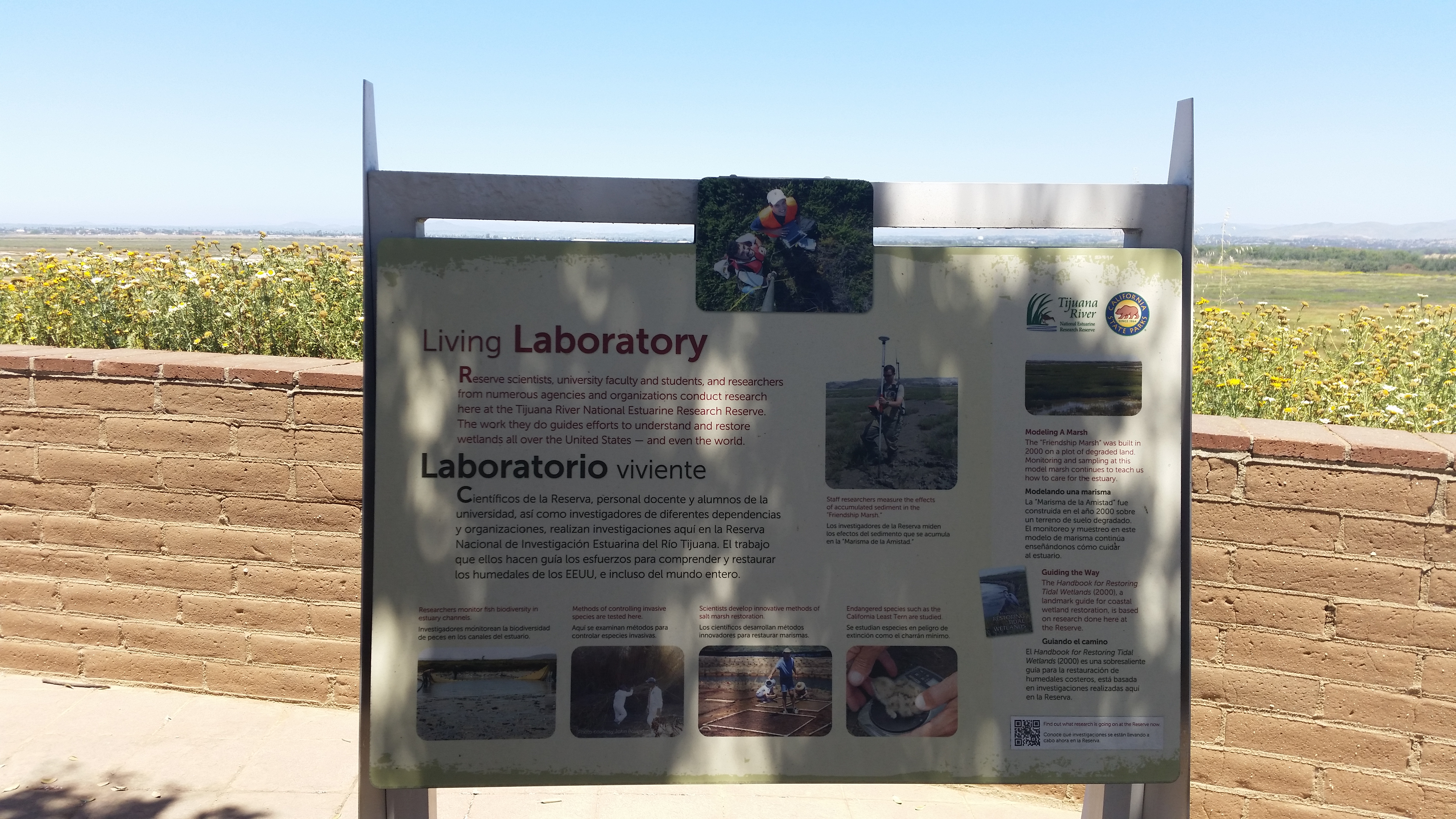

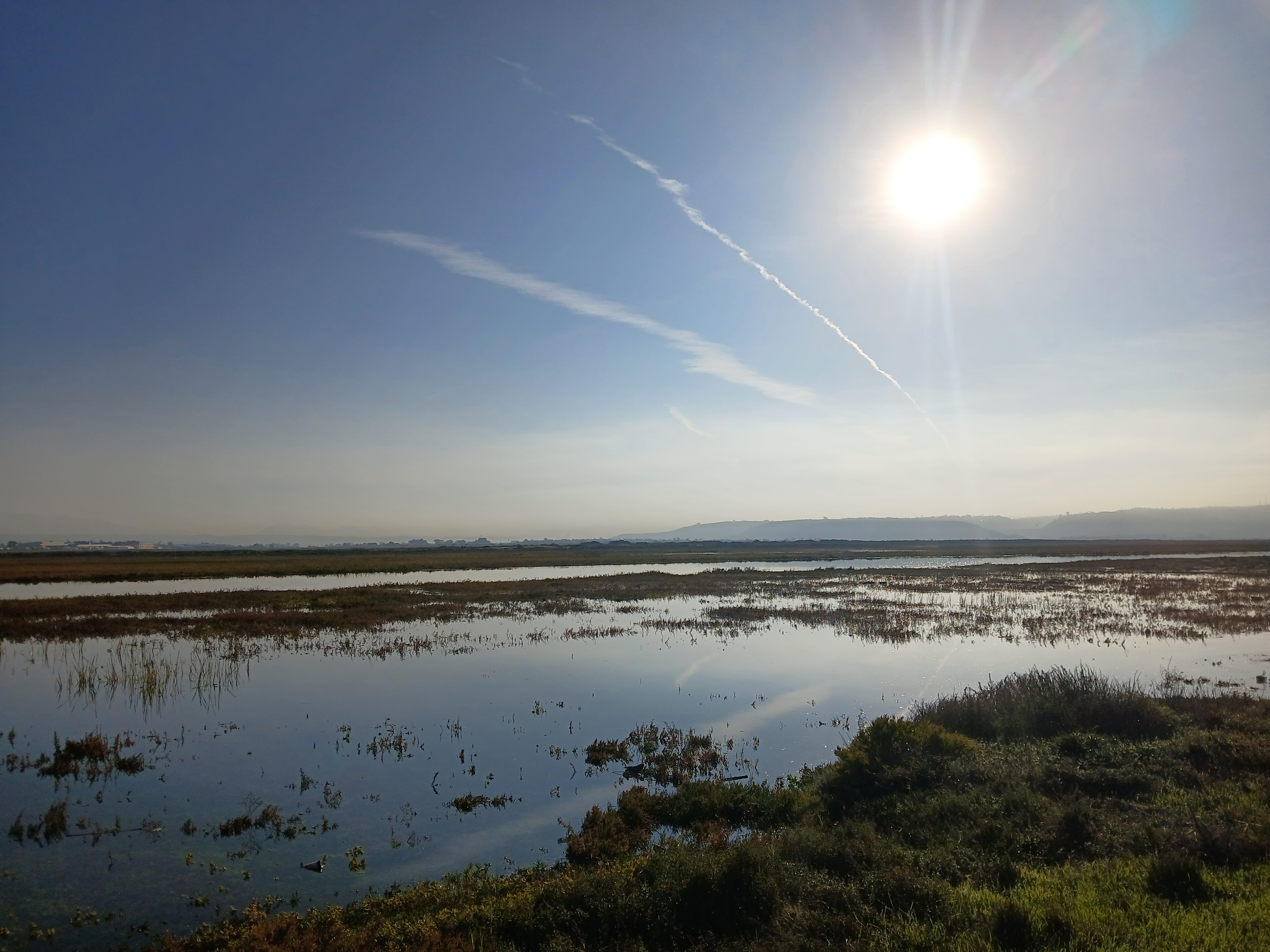

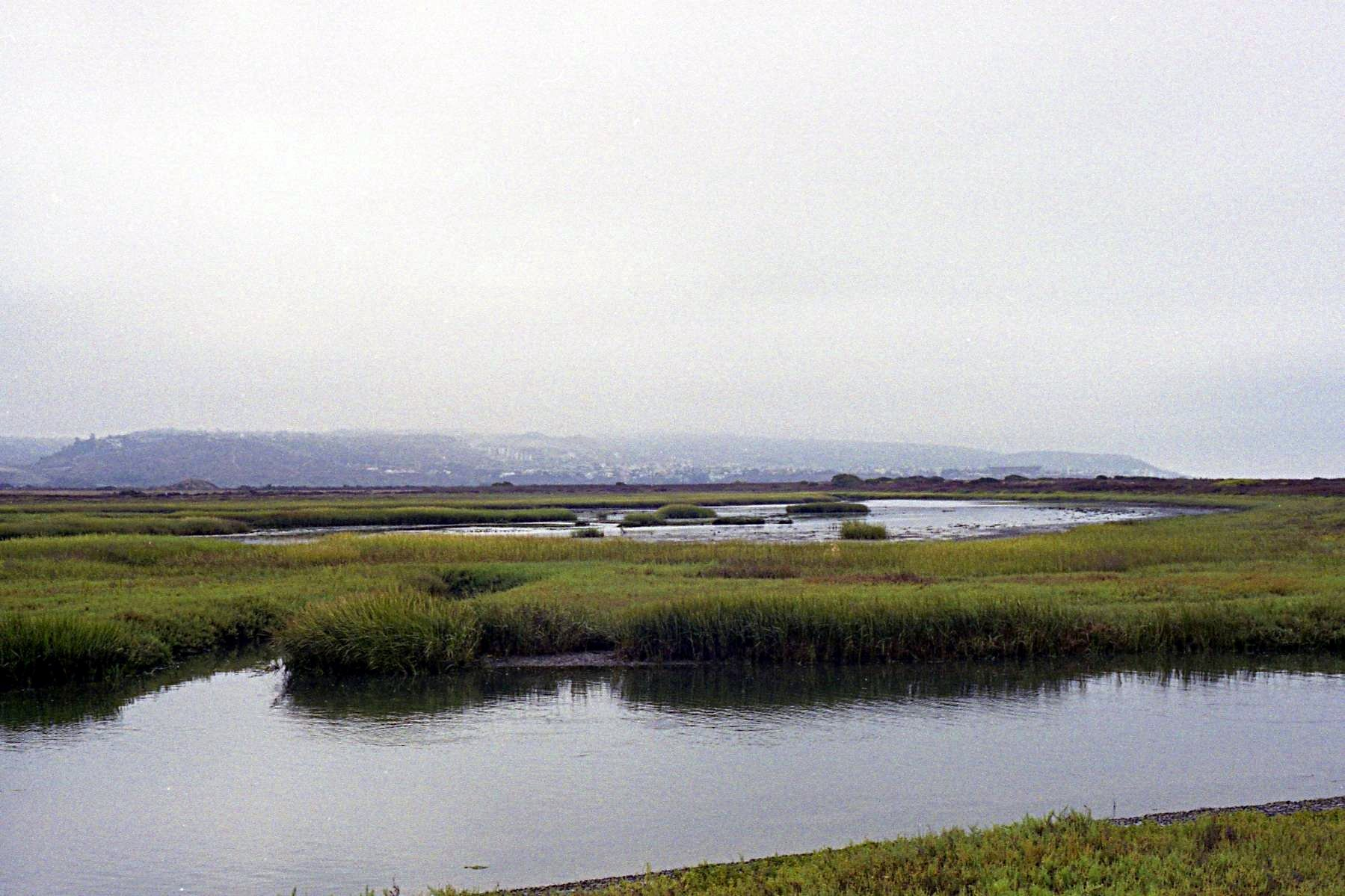
The Tijuana River Estuary.

It can be accessed from the Coronado Avenue exit (Exit 4) from Interstate 5. It is established as part of the National Estuarine Research Reserve system in the United States and is a Biological Field Station by the San Diego State University College of Sciences. The water flow of Tijuana River is often intense; droughts dry up the river completely while the same area overflows during flood.

=== Recreational and educational activities ===
This reserve is a good place for bird-watching since as many as 370 bird species, both native and migrating, use the area as a stopover or for breeding. Schoolchildren often come to this reserve to take nature classes in classrooms and excursions. Visitors of all ages can come to the visitor center for activities. Among the activities are videos that can be shown upon request, and it is shown in both English and Spanish. Guests can also take a walk on North and South McCoy trails, where they can access primary bird-watching areas and the mouth of Tijuana River, where it empties directly into Pacific Ocean.

=== Pollution ===
A $1.6 million grant was awarded by the California Integrated Waste Management Board to clean up the trash and debris that has collected on the Tijuana River Valley and Goat Canyon Estuary. These lie within the Tijuana River National Estuarine Research Reserve. Storm water has carried an influx of debris, tires, and trash to the shores of the Tijuana River Valley. Goat Canyon sediment basins were constructed in 2005 to help manage the storm water and debris. California State Parks will be in charge of maintaining the upkeep of the reserve. They are also responsible for keeping the environment habitable for the wildlife. In 2013, a nonprofit group, 4Walls, was awarded $45,000 to aid in the cleanup of the Tijuana River by taking the trash pulled from the river and use it for building materials. This will reduce the costs of the park space materials, and make use of the trash collected to build park benches. To help with the cleanup of Los Sauces Park, Mexico's Environment Ministry (SEMARNAT) has donated materials and employed over 100 residents to replace the wild undergrowth with plants native to the area. This was made possible through SEMARNAT's "Temporary Employment Program".

== See also ==
- Tijuana River#Description
