= Tijuana Slough National Wildlife Refuge =

Wildlife refuge in San Diego, California

- IUCN category IV (habitat/species management area)
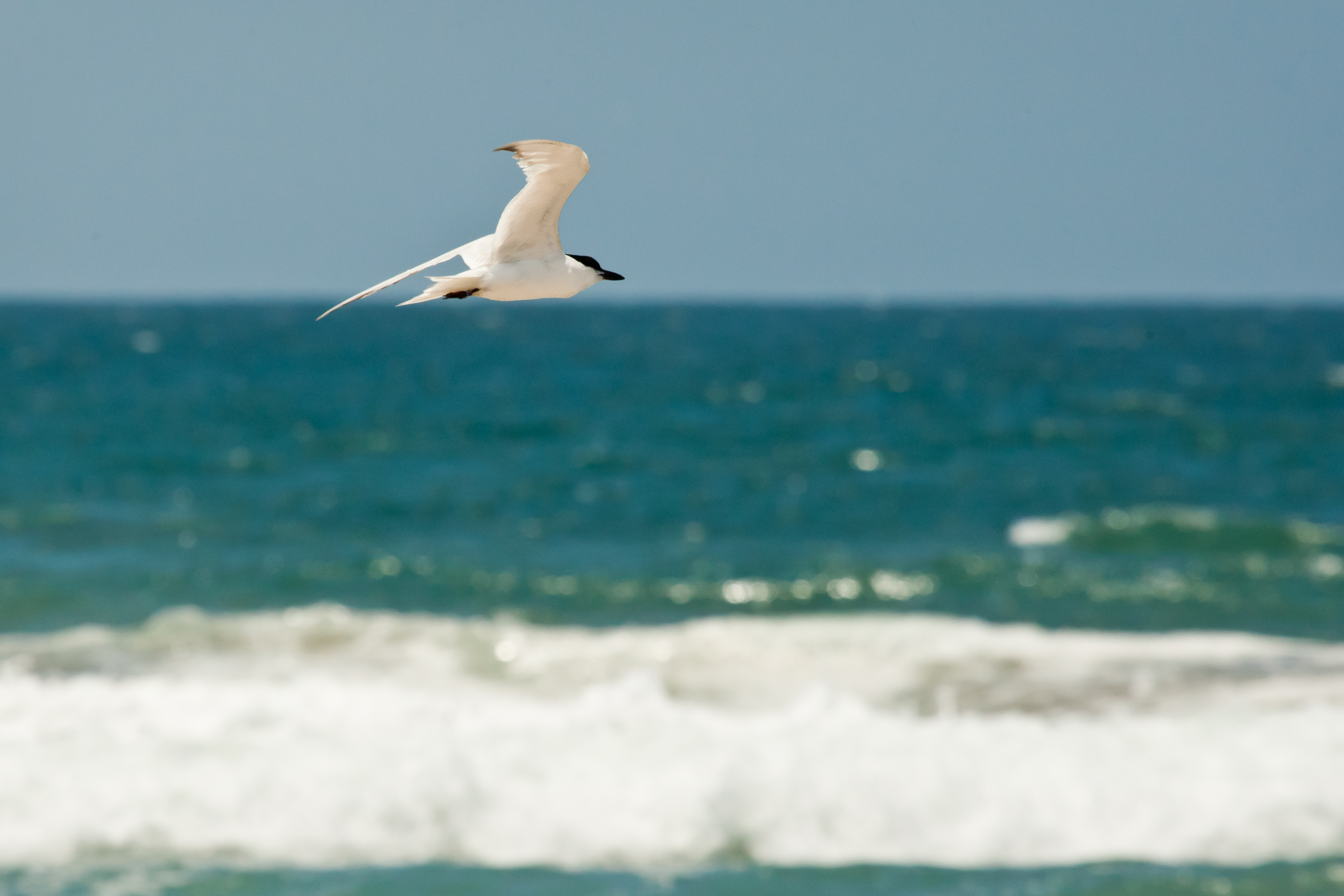

- Location within the United States
- Location: San Diego County, California, United States
- Nearest city: Imperial Beach, California
- Coordinates: 32.5565°N 117.1271°W
- Area: 2,521 acres (10.20 km^{2})
- Established: 1980
- Governing body: U.S. Fish and Wildlife Service
- Website: Tijuana Slough National Wildlife Refuge

Tijuana Slough National Wildlife Refuge is a wildlife refuge in the most southwestern corner of the contiguous United States near the San Ysidro International Border. As a National Wildlife Refuge, it is administered by the U.S. Fish and Wildlife Service. It was established in 1980.

The refuge forms the northern part of the Tijuana River National Estuarine Research Reserve, one of 22 National Estuarine Research Reserves created nationwide to enhance scientific and public understanding of estuaries, and thereby contribute to improved estuarine management. It is also part of the San Diego National Wildlife Refuge Complex.

== Description ==
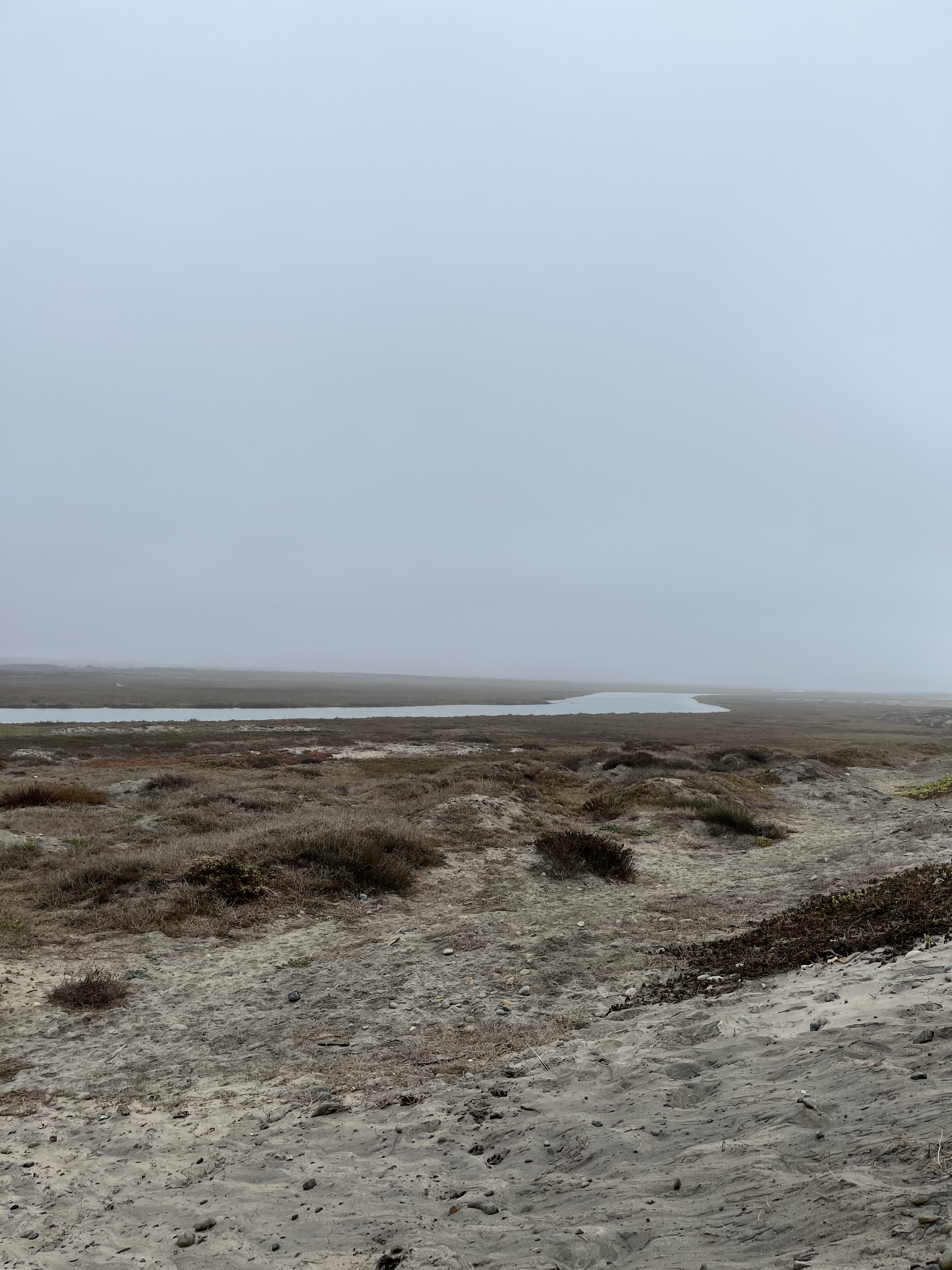
Oneonta Slough, located in the Tijuana Slough National Wildlife Refuge.

The slough is one of Southern California's largest remaining salt marshes without a road or railroad trestle running through it. This important salt marsh is surrounded by San Diego County and Tijuana, Mexico, with a population of 4.3 million people. Within this international bioregion, the refuge maintains essential habitats for many migrating shorebirds and waterfowl along the Pacific Flyway.

Tijuana Slough provides critical habitat for the federally listed endangered California least tern (Sterna antillarum browni), light-footed rail (Rallus obsoletus levipes) and least Bell's vireo (Vireo bellii pusillus), as well as the salt marsh bird's-beak (Cordylanthus maritimus maritimus), an endangered plant species. Designated as a Globally Important Bird Area by the American Bird Conservancy, over 370 species of birds have been sighted on the refuge.

The refuge's habitat and wildlife management programs focus on the recovery of endangered species through research, habitat restoration, and environmental education.

== See also ==
- Tijuana River Estuary
