= San Diego State University College of Sciences =

- Type: Public
- Parent institution: San Diego State University
- Dean: Jeffrey Roberts
- Students: 5,748
- Undergraduates: 4,858
- Postgraduates: 890
- Location: San Diego, California, U.S.
- Website: sciences.sdsu.edu

The San Diego State University College of Sciences is a college of San Diego State University (SDSU). Comprising eight departments and various specialties, the college offers bachelor's, master's and doctoral degrees, as well as curricula for pre-professional students in medicine, veterinary medicine and dentistry.

== Academics ==
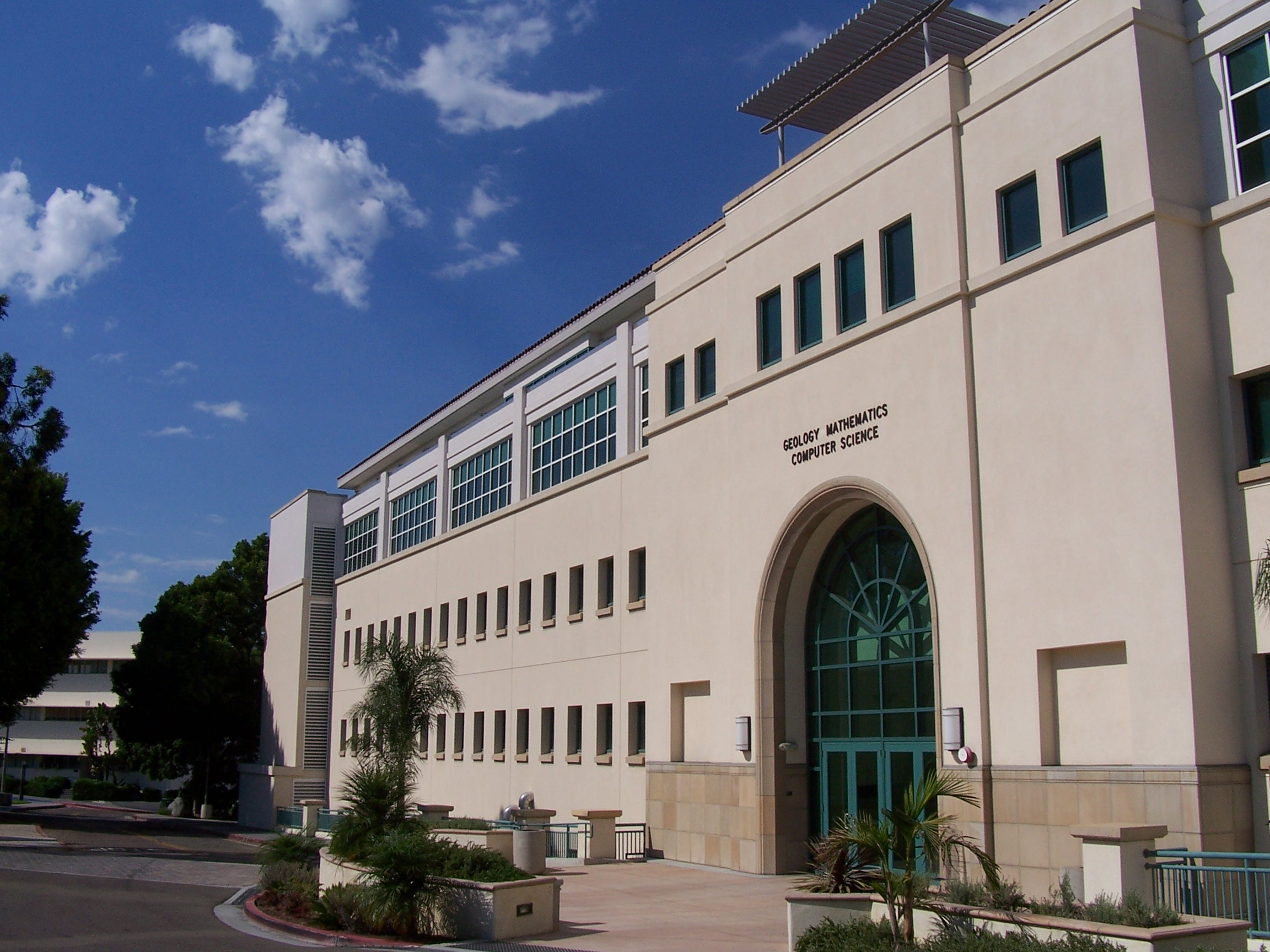
SDSU Geology, Mathematics & Computer Sciences building

=== Departments ===
The College of Sciences includes several academic departments:

- Astronomy
- Biology
- Chemistry & Biochemistry
- Computer Science
- Geological Sciences
- Mathematics & Statistics
- Physics
- Psychology

==== Institutes and Research Centers ====
- Donald P. Shiley BioScience Center
- Center for Research in Mathematics and Science Education
- Coastal & Marine Institute Laboratory
- Global Change Research Group
- SDSU Visualization Center

==== Biological Field Stations ====
- Field Station Programs
  - Santa Margarita Ecological Reserve
  - Sky Oaks Field Station
  - Fortuna Mountain Research Reserve
  - Tijuana River National Estuarine Research Reserve

==== Biotechnology ====
- Center for Bio/Pharmaceutical and Biodevice Development

The Center for Bio/Pharmaceutical and Biodevice Development at San Diego State University provides education and training through distance learning that enhance the professional excellence and career opportunities of scientists in the pharmaceutical, biotechnology and medical device industries#

- Special Programs:
  - The SDSU BioScience Center
  - Biomedical Quality Systems

== Mount Laguna Observatory ==
- Mount Laguna Observatory
  - An astronomical observatory located in the Cleveland National Forest, owned and operated by SDSU
    - SDSU is the only institution in the California State University system that offers a complete academic program in Astronomy, including the awarding of graduate degrees.
