= International Boundary Wastewater Treatment Plant =

International wastewater treatment plant in San Diego, California, US

Coordinates: 32.54284°N 117.0638°W

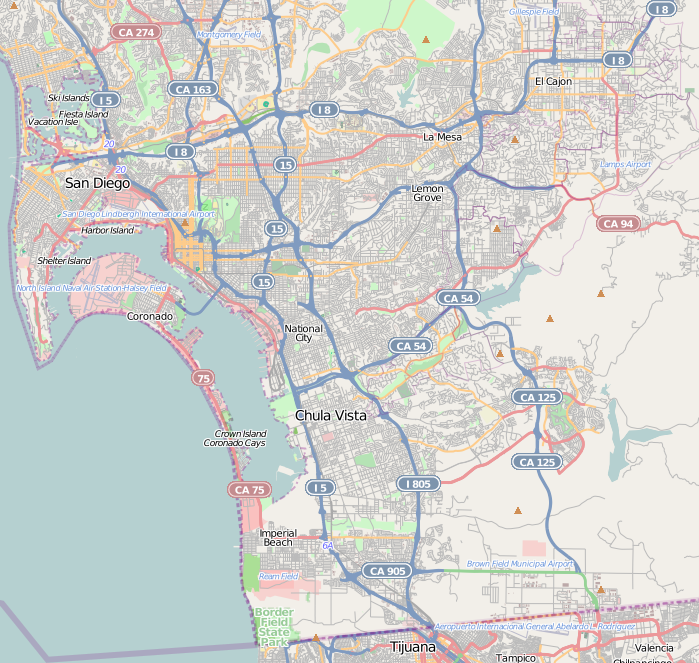
International Boundary Wastewater Treatment Plant (Southern San Diego)

The International Wastewater Treatment Plant (IWTP) is a sewage treatment plant developed by the International Boundary and Water Commission (IBWC) in the South Bay area of San Diego, California. Construction began on a 75-acre site (30 ha), west of San Ysidro in the Tijuana River Valley. The project, authorized by the U.S. Congress in 1989 and formally agreed between the two countries in July 1990, was part of a regional approach to solve long-standing problems, particularly the flow of sewage-contaminated water into the ocean via the Tijuana River.

Completed in spring 1997, the official ribbon-cutting ceremony took place on April 18 and the plant came on-line in May.

The International Wastewater Treatment Plant was created in an effort to mitigate pollution caused by untreated sewage coming from the city of Tijuana. The U.S. paid for the majority of the treatment plant, citing the sewage runoff as an international issue. It required the cooperation of multiple governmental bodies. Even though most of the plant's raw sewage comes from Tijuana, it is owned by the U.S. portion of the International Boundary and Water Commission, an agreement between Mexico and the US that helps delineate border lines and allocate water flow from the rivers and other bodies of water that intermingle between the U.S. and Mexico.

Due to the rapid growth Tijuana has experienced, failures of the sewer infrastructure are frequent. Mexico did not have the money to fund the entirety of a large treatment plant. The United States Environmental Protection Agency has assisted with funding the project under the rationale that the sewage flow from Tijuana often causes the closure of U.S. beaches due to bacterial contamination of the water. The project cost the U.S. a total of $239 million initially, and the addition of secondary treatment technology that helped meet regulations so the water could flow to the U.S. side of the border cost an additional $18 million. The treatment plant supports a daily flow of 25 million gallons of raw sewage per day. Ultimately, this agreement made strides to increase the availability of clean drinking water in Tijuana and helped to ensure that pollution and degradation to the surrounding environment was minimized.
