= Tijuana Estuary =

Estuary in San Diego County, California

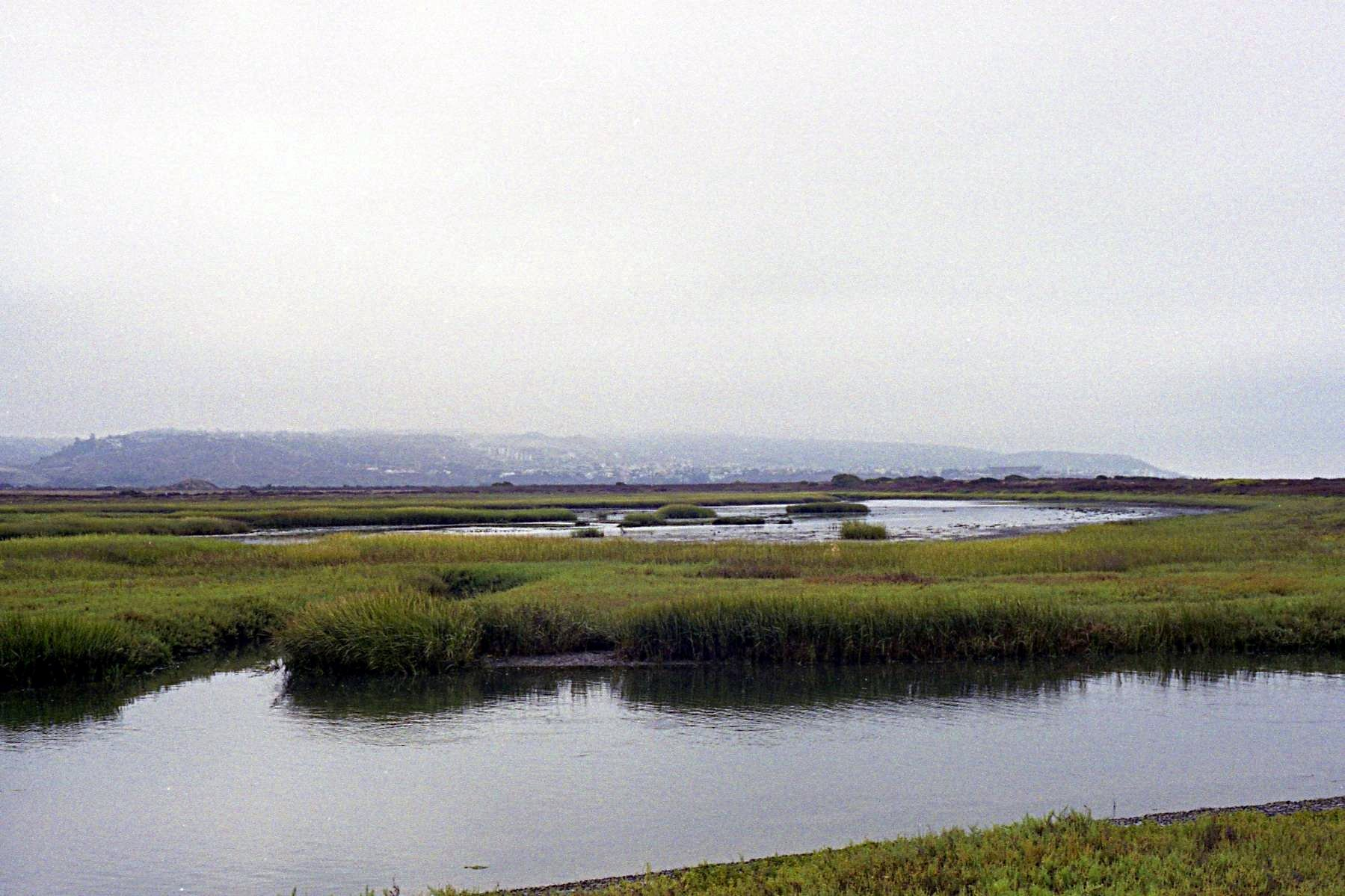
- Tijuana River Estuary

- Location within California Location within the United States
- Location: San Diego County, California
- Coordinates: 32°33′24″N 117°7′34″W
- Area: 1,569 acres (635 ha)
- Designated: 1973

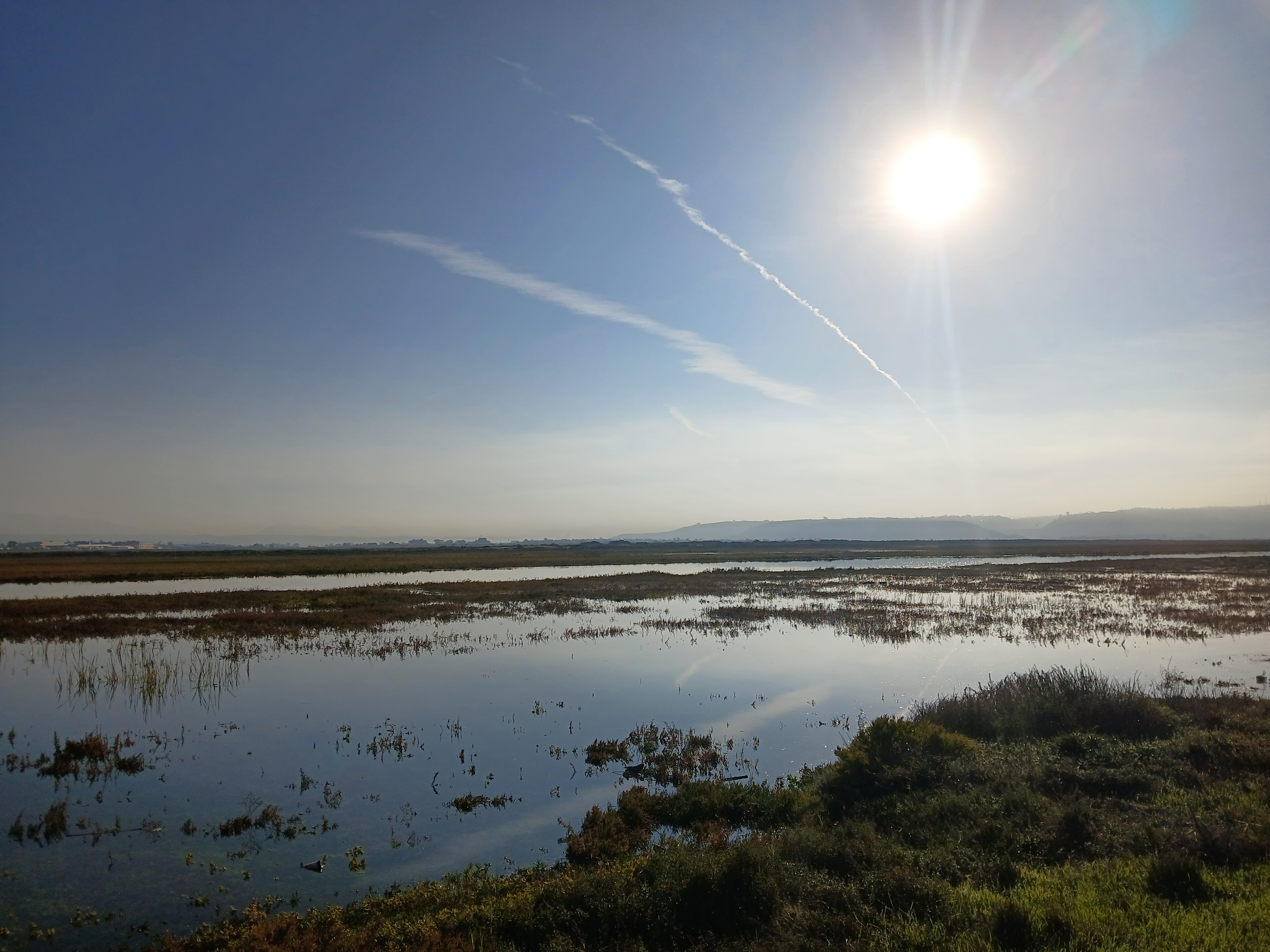
Tijuana Estuary, photo taken in the morning of the day. (Imperial Beach 2025)

The Tijuana Estuary (or Tijuana River Estuary) is an intertidal coastal wetland at the mouth of the Tijuana River in San Diego County, California, United States, bordering Tijuana, Baja California, Mexico. It is the location of Tijuana River National Estuarine Research Reserve, Tijuana Slough National Wildlife Refuge, Border Field State Park, and the Tijuana River Valley Regional Park. The estuary is a shallow water habitat. It was designated a National Natural Landmark in 1973.

== Ecology ==
The estuary is one of the few remaining intact coastal wetlands on the South Coast. Its location positions it under the path of the Pacific Flyway, where it serves as a stopover point. It is the largest remaining natural coastal area between Santa Barbara, California, and San Quintín, Baja California. The north arm is where the main body of the tidal salt marsh is located, while the south arm is on the opposite side. Three times the size of Central Park, the estuary covers about 2,500 acres, with 60 ha of it being tidal channels. Many species of migratory and native species rely on the estuary as an essential breeding, feeding, and nesting habitat. The estuary lies within the southernmost part of San Diego County within the city limits of the South Bay city of Imperial Beach.

Prior to 1994, foot traffic by illegal immigration was a major source of top soil erosion. After 1994, off-road vehicle usage for policing has become a major cause of soil loss. Beginning in 2010, a re-vegetation effort along the Mexico–United States border wall has occurred.

== Wildlife ==
The Tijuana River Estuary serves as a resting area for migratory birds for nearly 65 years, making it a popular destination for birdwatchers and photographers. Additionally, the estuary is also home to a variety of land and aquatic animals.

=== Aquatic life ===
Molluscs:

The estuary shelters several species of Molluscs, including:

- Bivalves: Bay Mussel, Smooth Cockle, Asian Mussel, Wavy Cockle, Littleneck Clam, California Jack-knife Clam, and Bent-nose Clam. These Bivalves range in size from 10 mm to 100 mm.
- Gastropods: Bent-nose Clam, California Horn snail, Salt Marsh Snail, and Yellow Shore Crab. The sizes range from 25 mm to 60 mm.

Crustaceans:

This estuary hosts Red Ghost Shrimp and Striped Shore Crab.

Fish Species:

The estuary is home to two main categories of fish:

- Bony Fish: Arrow Goby, Longjaw Mudsucker, Yellowfin Goby, California Halibut, Flathead mullet, Topsmelt
- Cartilaginous Fish: California Killifish, Gray Smoothhound Shark, Round Stingray, Diatoms, Polychaete, and many different species of amphipods.

=== Terrestrial life ===
Mammals: Most of the mammals that reside in the estuary are either nocturnal or crepuscular.

- Nocturnal or crepuscular: Striped skunks, Opossums, and Bats.
- Common Species: Desert Cottontail, Black-tailed Jackrabbits, Long-tailed Weasels, California ground squirrels, California voles, Deer mice, Coyotes, and Gray foxes.

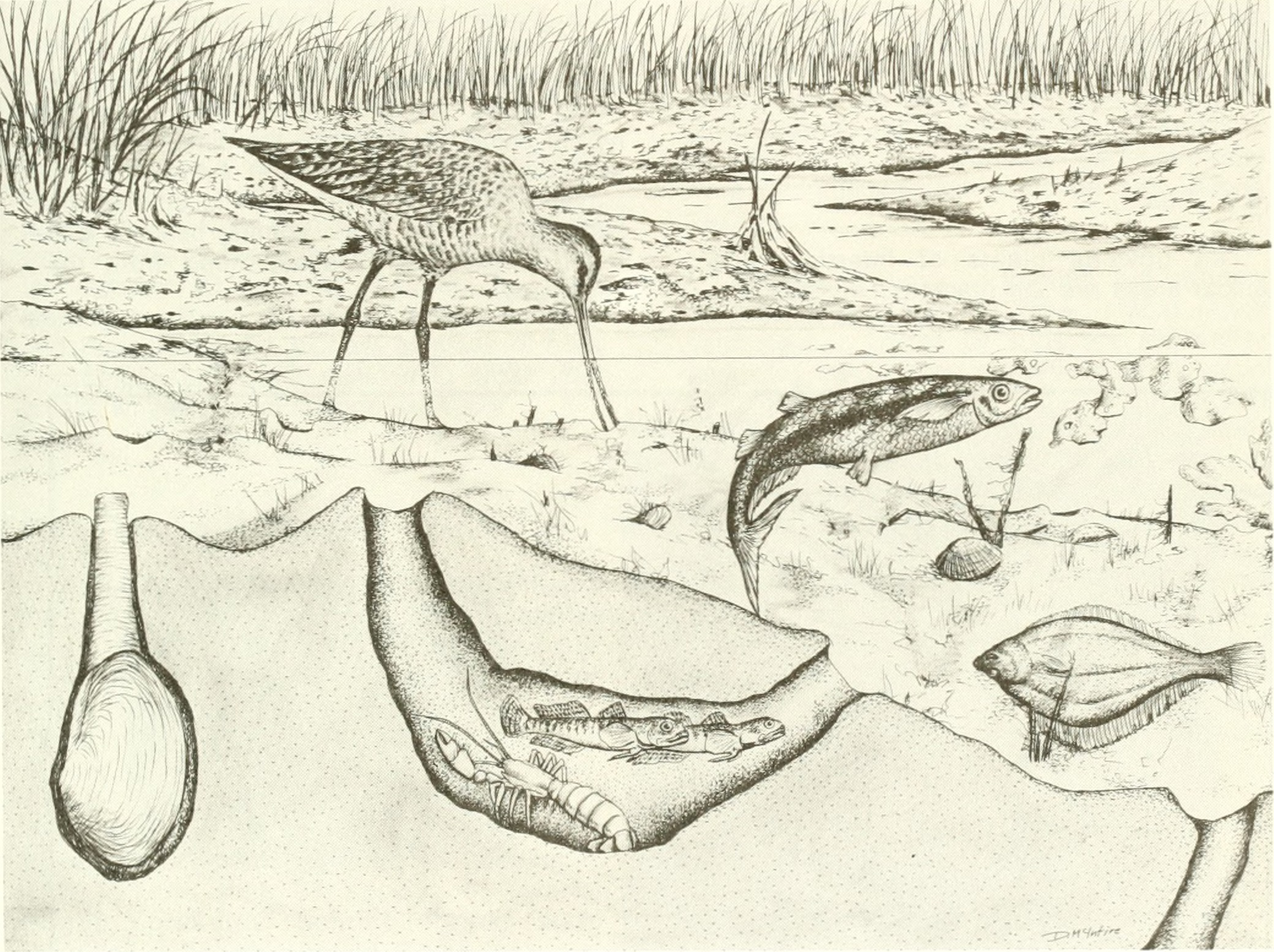
Types of wildlife that exist in the estuary

The estuary also supports a variety of reptiles and amphibians:

- Amphibians: Frogs, Toads and Salamanders
- Reptiles: Lizards and snakes, including non-native species.

Avian Life: The bird life is very diverse with common, sensitive, and migratory birds.

- Common Birds: Anna's hummingbird, Northern harrier, Osprey, Snowy egret, Song Sparrow, and Black phoebe
- Sensitive Species: Light-footed Ridgway's rail, Belding's savannah sparrow, California least tern, Western snowy plover, California gnatcatcher, and Least Bell's vireo
- Migratory Birds: American wigeon, Northern pintail, Hooded oriole, Yellow-rumped warbler, White-crowned sparrow, and Cliff swallow

== Pollution ==
For decades, Tijuana has generated raw sewage and runoff pollution that has flooded into the estuary. Even though it is a designated NERR site, industries continue to pollute and disregard regulations.

Research has been conducted to assess the pollution levels in the estuary. Sediment samples were collected from four TRE locations within the estuary under various weather conditions.

Using gas chromatography high-resolution mass spectrometry to screen organic chemicals, the researchers identified 6,978 compounds. The identifications were refined to focus on 152 organic pollutants and 18 inorganic elements. Results indicated that sediment from dry conditions had greater contaminant levels compared to wet conditions, where the highest concentrations centered at the U.S.-Mexico border. The findings included current-use pesticides, like pyrethroid insecticides and the thiocarbamate herbicide s-Ethyl dipropylthiocarbamate, and even U.S banned pesticides were discovered. This study concluded that the presence of organic pollutants in the sediments of the estuary, suggesting multiple contamination sources, potentially from cross-border pollution from Mexico.

The wildlife in the estuary have been facing the consequences of the wastewater entering their homes. This has mainly affected the fish and benthic macro-invertebrates. Due to human disturbances causing the reduced salinity, most benthic species went into extinction.

Occasional sewage flows from Goat Canyon and Smuggler's Gulch enter the estuary. A study was conducted to gather information on the path of wastewater entering the estuary. The wastewater entered through the river and sewage excess from broken pipelines flowed from the southern portion to the mouth. This resulted in more traces of sewage near the mouth.
