= Border Field State Park =

State park in San Diego, California

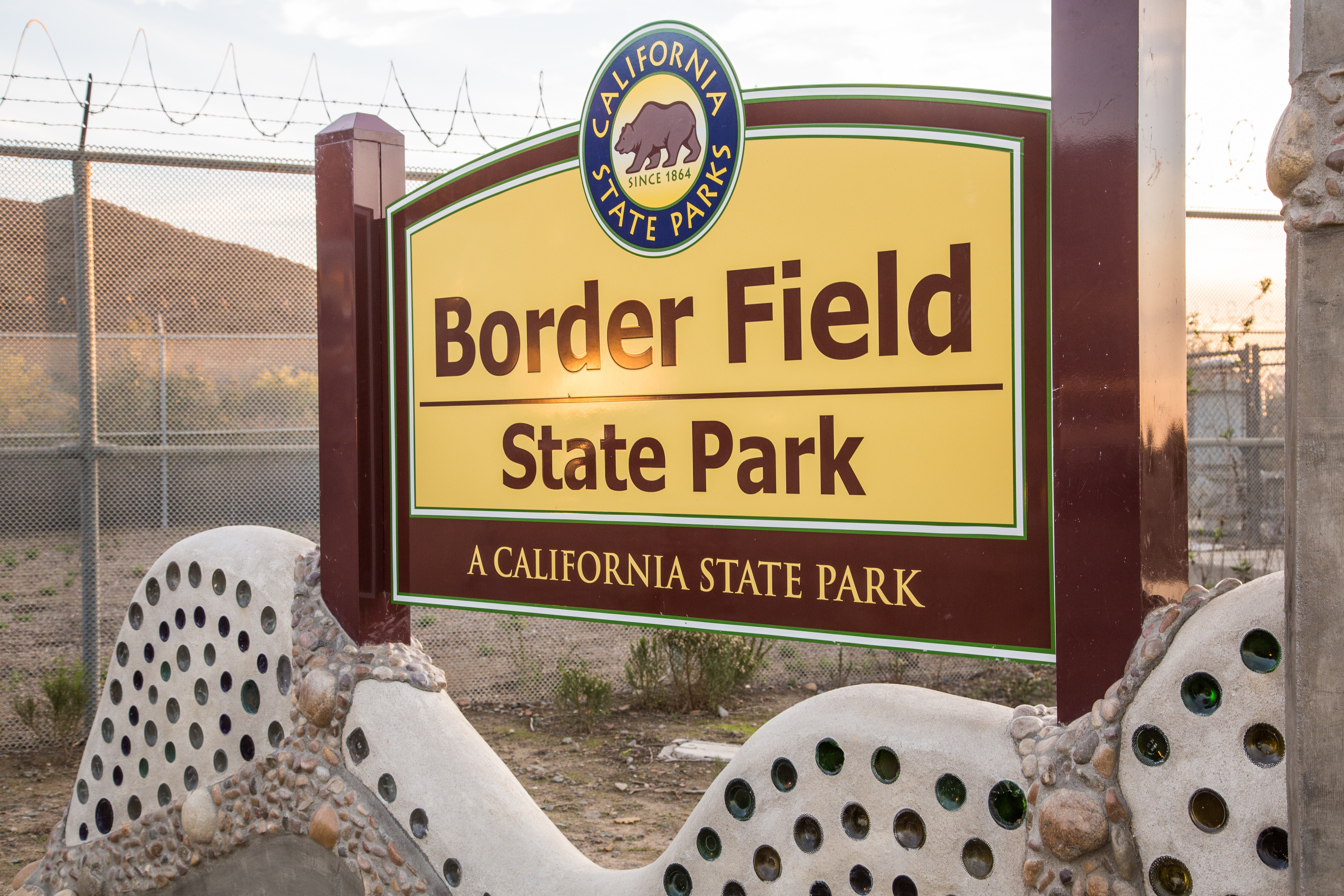
- Border Field State Park sign

- Location within California Location within the United States
- Location: San Diego County, California, United States
- Nearest city: Imperial Beach, California
- Coordinates: 32°32′36″N 117°6′23″W
- Area: 1,316 acres (5.33 km^{2})
- Established: 1972
- Visitors: 62,000 (in FY 2014/2015)
- Governing body: California Department of Parks and Recreation
- Website: http://www.parks.ca.gov/?page_id=664

Border Field State Park is a state park of California, United States, containing beach and coastal habitat on the Mexico–United States border. The park is within the city limits of Imperial Beach in San Diego County, next to the suburb of Playas de Tijuana in Mexico. It contains the southernmost point in the state of California. The refuge forms the southern part of Tijuana River National Estuarine Research Reserve.

Border Field State Park contains Friendship Park, which is just inland from the place where the border meets the ocean. Immediately adjacent is the Initial Point of Boundary Between U.S. and Mexico.

== History ==
The Treaty of Guadalupe Hidalgo was concluded on February 2, 1848, officially ending the war between the United States and Mexico. It provided that the new international border between the two countries be established by a joint United States and Mexican Boundary Survey. The commission began its survey at Border Field. During World War II it was base for Border Naval Outlying Landing Field

The park was closed to the public in 2020 during the COVID-19 outbreak. After the COVID-19 threat passed, the park remained closed, ostensibly due to flooding and sewage issues. In 2024 the park remained closed, purportedly due to construction on new border fence. The park remains closed as of January 2025.

Escalating militarization of the U.S.’s border barrier at Border Field State Park

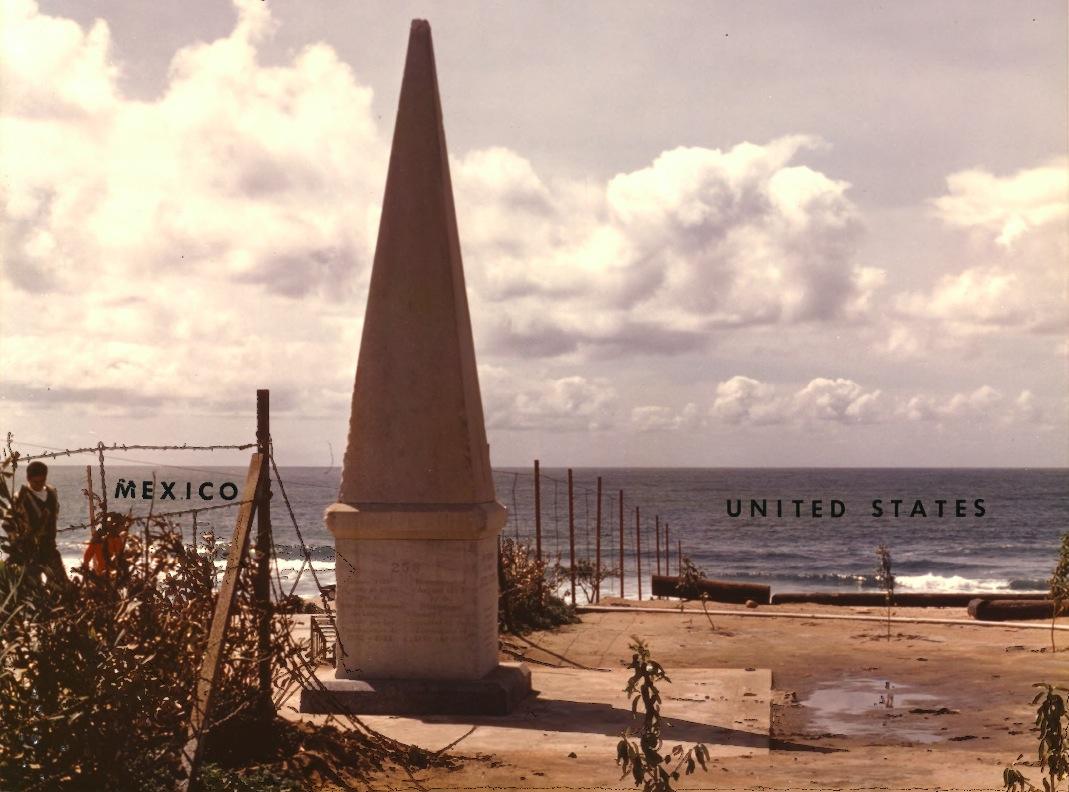
1974 border

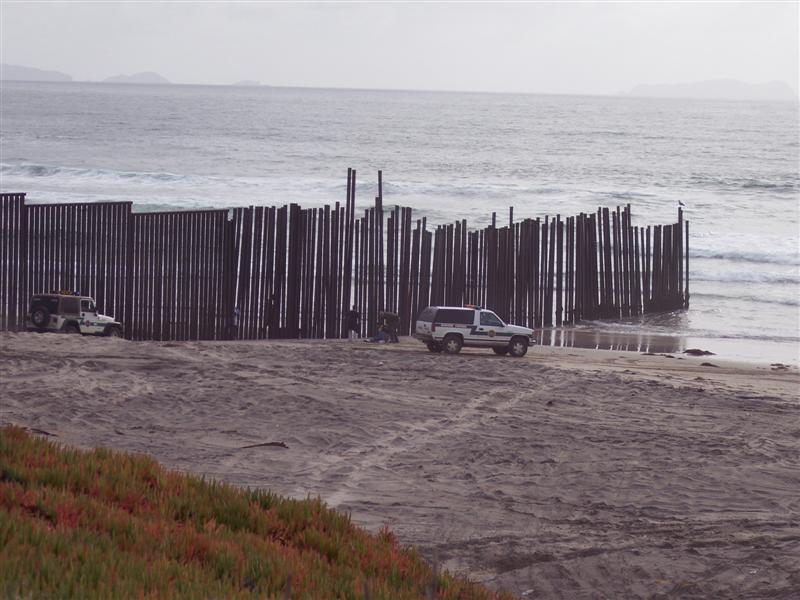
2008 border. (Border Patrol vehicles present in image)

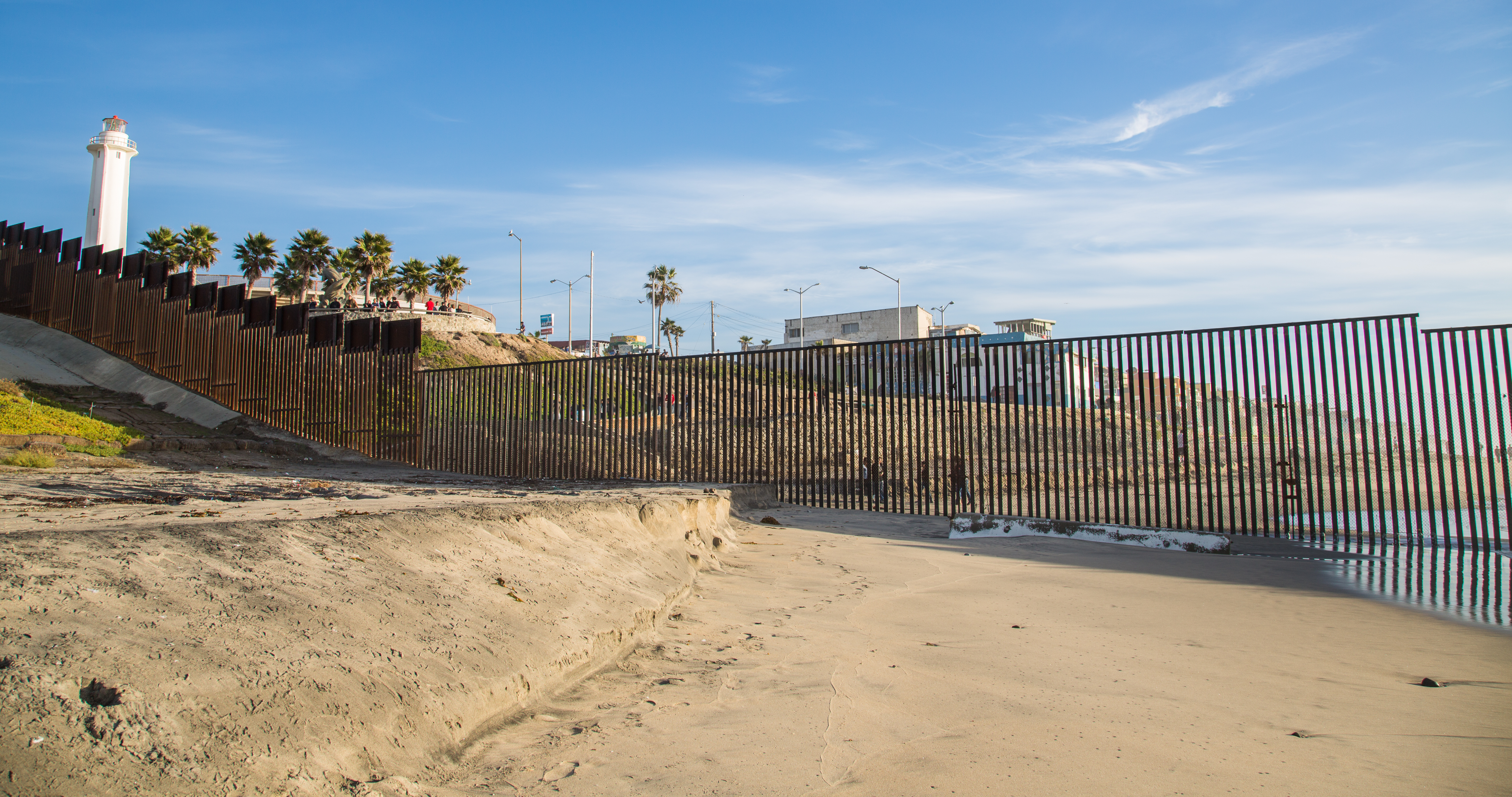
2014 border

== Habitat ==
The Tijuana River National Estuarine Research Reserve contains much of Border Field State Park and is an important wildlife habitat. The salt and freshwater marshes give refuge to migrating waterfowl and resident wading birds, such as black-necked stilt, American avocet, green-winged teal, American wigeon and pelicans. The park offers hiking, horse trails, surf fishing and birding.

== Visitors ==
For fiscal year 2014–2015 61,799 people visited the Border Field State Park, up from 45,633 in FY 2011–2012.

To the East: San Ysidro	California State Beaches	To the South; Tijuana

== See also ==
- Initial Point of Boundary Between U.S. and Mexico
- Friendship Park
- Imperial Beach
- List of beaches in San Diego County
- List of California state parks
- Mexico–United States international park
- Playas de Tijuana
- Tijuana River (Río Tijuana)
- Tijuana River National Estuarine Research Reserve
- Tortilla Wall
