= Corinne Holt Sawyer =

American author and scholar (born 1924)

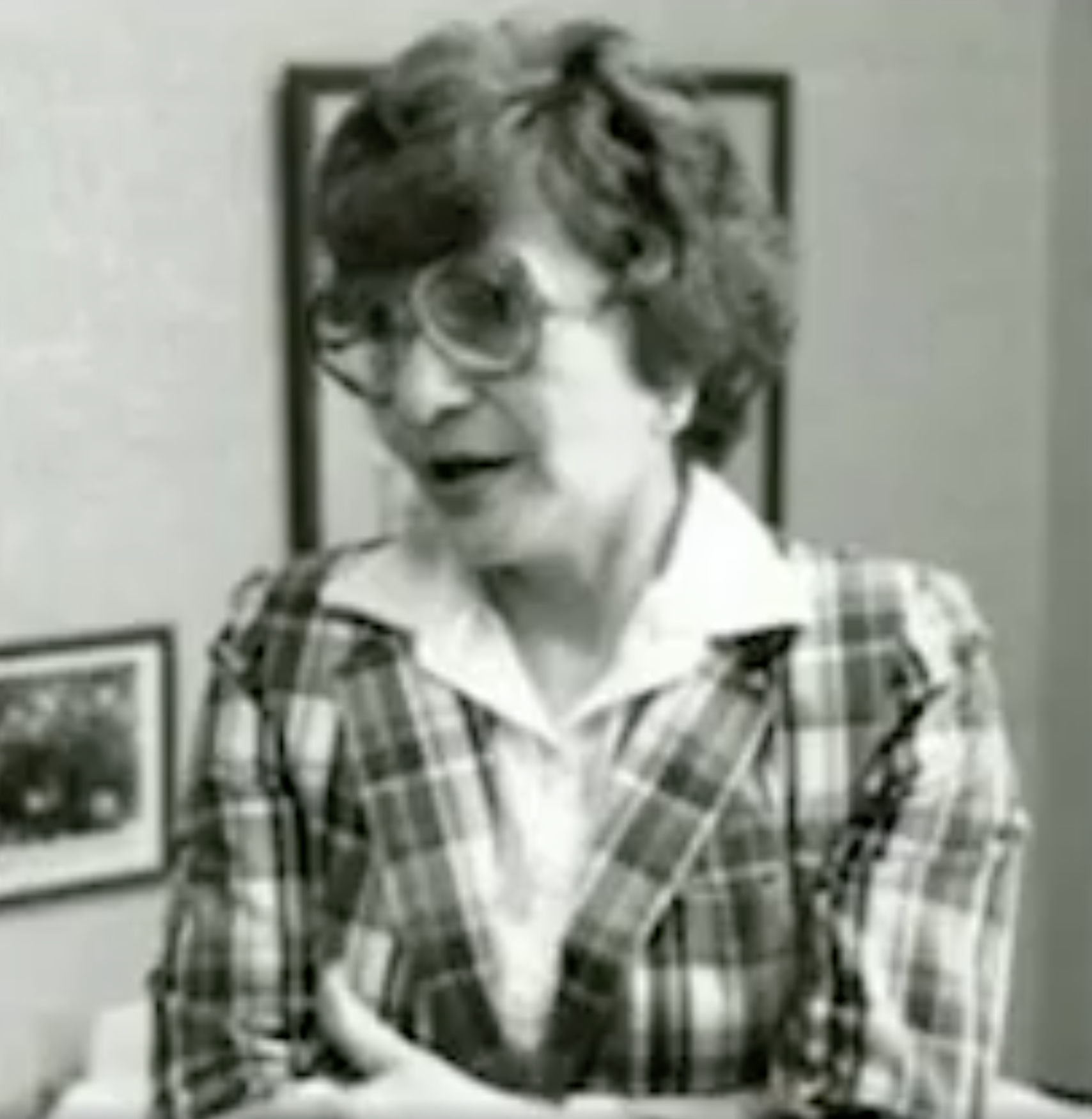
- Born: Corinne Margaret Holt; March 4, 1924; Chisholm, Minnesota, U.S.
- Occupation: Novelist
- Writing career
- Genre: Mystery
- Notable work: Benbow/Wingate series

Corinne Margaret Holt Sawyer (born March 4, 1924) is an American scholar who was the author of a popular mystery series and other works. She has also written under the name of Corinne Holt and Corinne Holt Rickert. Dr. Sawyer retired in 1988 as professor of English at Clemson University, where she still holds the position of Professor Emerita. Her first novel was nominated for an Agatha Award for Best First Novel in 1988, beginning the popular Benbow/Wingate series of mystery novels renown for their depiction of older female investigations. As an educator, she was instrumental in creating the Sawyer-Snelsire-Robinson Workshop to assist minority students in enrolling at Clemson.

== Early history and education ==
Corinne Margaret Holt was born in Chisholm, Minnesota on March 4, 1924. Her marriage to Robert T. Rickert ended in divorce, later marrying Hugh A. Sawyer, Jr. (died 1969). She attended the University of Minnesota, earning a Bachelor of Arts in English in 1945 and a Master of Arts in 1947. While at Minnesota, she adapted material for both the stage and for radio. Sawyer earned her Ph.D. in English from the Shakespeare Institute at Birmingham University, England, in 1954. Her graduate work was under the direction of professor Allardyce Nichol. She was among the first doctoral graduates at the institute, which was formed in 1951.

== Career ==
Graduating from the University of Minnesota in 1947, Sawyer moved to England for her doctoral studies. While in residence there, she taught at the University of Maryland Overseas, leading college-level classes in speech and in English to United States Air Force (USAF) personnel in Scotland and England. Returning to the United States in 1959, she ran an experimental program providing television lectures in history, general science, political science, literature, and mathematics, designed to reach large freshman classes at East Carolina University. This drew upon her Masters thesis of 1948 entitled A Series of Psychology Lectures Dramatized for Radio Presentation. Sawyer also worked for many years in radio and television, writing and appearing in talk shows. In this capacity, she narrated travel features, hosted fashion shows, and co-hosted a late night variety and talk show which included her own popular household tips program at WNCT-TV in Greenville, North Carolina. In 1966, she moved to South Carolina, where she taught English and popular culture at Clemson University, attaining the rank of full professor before retiring in 1988. She was instrumental in creating the Clemson Career Workshop, known as the Sawyer-Snelsire-Robinson Workshop, a successful summer program to introduce minority students to the rigors of college work.

== Early works ==
Sawyer's early works were related to sixteenth century English literature and history. These include works related to her studies of Elizabethan literature at the Shakespeare Institute.

- Books and Readers 1595–1600 (1952), as Corinne Holt. A continuation of a book purporting to review all books printed in England or in English abroad from the start of printing until 1634, including works by William Shakespeare, Edmund Spenser and Christopher Marlowe. Her work was one of a series of studies that intended to fill in the latter years not covered by a previously printed scholarly book covering the earlier years, before the Tudor period, when there were fewer publications.
- The Case of John Darrell. Minister and Exorcist (1962), as Corinne Holt Rickert. An account of the prosecution of John Darrell, a 16th-century Anglican clergyman who was accused of fraudulent exorcisms.

== The Benbow/Wingate Mystery Series ==
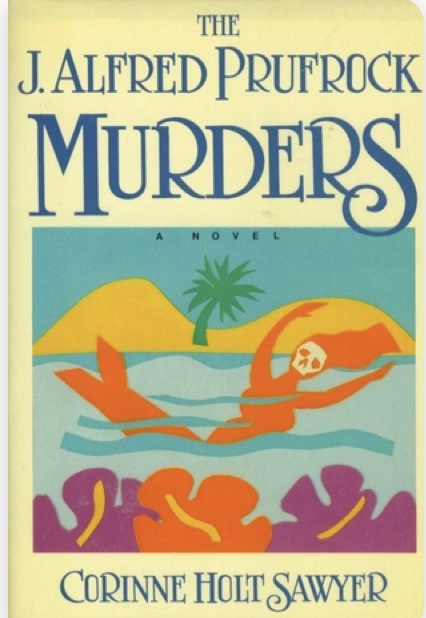
The J. Alfred Prufrock Murders (1988)

Sawyer is the author of the Angela Benbow and Caledonia Wingate mystery series, which follow a tradition of elderly women as amateur detectives. Angela and Caledonia are septuagenarians living in the upscale retirement community of Camden-sur-Mer, a posh complex for senior citizens near San Diego. Mystery and mayhem follow the formidable Caledonia and the tiny caustic Angela all over Southern California. Cited by Elizabeth Lindsay in her Great Women Mystery Writers, the first of the Benbow/Wingate novels was nominated for the Agatha Award for Best First Novel of 1988.

In The Older Woman in Recent Fiction, Zoe Brennan compares Sawyer's mystery works to those of Gladys Mitchell and her creation Mrs. Bradley and Patricia Wentworth with Miss Maud Silver Colleen Barnett's compendium Mystery Women: An Encyclopedia of Leading Women Characters in Mystery Fiction, 1860–1979, discusses the Benbow/Wingate mystery series:

- The J. Alfred Prufrock Murders (1988). The first of the novels features four elderly female residents of Camden-sur-Mer, including Angela and Caledonia, investigating a murder on the beach. The victim was Sweetie Gilfillan, an ex-librarian who subsidized her retirement by blackmailing her fellow residents. The ladies shrugged off their infirmities despite being warned of the risks by a Lt. Martinez, who would be a recurring character. The minor characters of "Nan" Church and Stella Austin would fade away, as the elderly often do.
- Murder in Gray and White (1989). When new resident Amy Kinseth, who was thoroughly disliked, is murdered, the sprightly widows Angela and Caledonia offered their services to Lt. Martinez. They set about solving the crime, ignoring such niceties as search warrants, Martinez tried to limit their activities, but they find themselves in almost as much trouble as the murder victim herself.
- Murder by Owl Light (1992). The ladies are determined to solve the fatal stabbing of Enrique Ontelano, the vending machine repairman at their retirement complex. The killer strikes again, this time the mild-mannered gardener Rollo Bagwell was killed with garden shears, and the elderly duo press their investigation. Was a serial killer be loose at the Home? It surely appeared so, especially after the murderer claims a third victim, Lena Gardener. Shortly before her death, Miss Gardener, a new and unhappy arrival, had accused Angela of stealing her antique brooch, and Angela briefly finds herself a suspect.
- The Peanut Butter Murders (1993). The intrepid not-so-over-the-hill sleuths Angela and Caledonia investigate the death of a new neighbor, Alexander Lightfoot, who fell or was pushed into the path of an oncoming train. At fifty, the victim was a bit too young for Camden-sur-Mer, but his fiancee, Edna Ferrier, a tad older by fifteen years, is a suspect as is Miss Stoner, a secretary for the firm that manages Edna's trust. Angela and Caledonia are naturally asked to intervene.
- Murder Has No Calories (1994). When a beautiful staff member at a California fat farm is found brutally murdered, the owner pleads with the plucky senior sleuths from Camden-sur-Mer to investigate. So Angela Benbow and Caledonia Wingate quickly join the edgy little party at The Time-Out Inn to check out their fellow guests: grumpy Marceline, face-lifted Carmen, dimpled Cracker, saggy Judy, and roly-poly Tilly, among others. Very nice ladies, too—on the surface. But beneath one of those mud-packs lurks a killer. Too bad that Angela's and Caledonia's impulsive sleuthing is pushing them toward a fate worse than aerobics.
- Ho-Ho Homicide (1995). During Christmas-time at Camden-sur-Mer, Angela and Caledonia are up to their elbows in Christmas spirit – when what should turn up under the tree but the body of another resident of the Home. Naturally, inevitably, the elderly detective duo lend a considerable hand to the less-than-grateful Lieutenant Martinez in uncovering the villain.
- The Geezer Factory Murders (1996). Camden-sur-Mer is riding high, thanks to transfers from a rival establishment, known as the Geezer Factory. For one newcomer, however, the move is fatal. No sooner does that nice couple, the Goulds, move in than Harold Gould is murdered. So resident sleuths Angela and Caledonia set out to investigate a puzzle that begins with ghostbusting at the Geezer Factory. But only after acute risk to life, limb, and dignity does the indomitable duo put it all together, a picture that shocks them as much as it does everybody else.
- Murder Ole! (1997). Life at Camden-Sur-Mer follows a comfortable routine, usually a nap in the afternoon and a glass of sherry before dinner, and daily activities involve creating craft projects from toothpicks. So Angela and Caledonia help organize Spanish lessons for the group, inspiring a trip to Tijuana, Mexico. Naturally, one member of the outing doesn't make it back across the border alive. Then a second excursion to Ensenada for shopping and margaritas leaves the bus driver dead. The ladies are then in the thick of an investigation, and Angela is very close to discovering just who is responsible for the foul play, and to becoming the next victim.
- Bed Breakfast and Bodies (1998). The final work in the series was never released due do a conflict among publishing companies.

Many of these will be republished by British publishing company Duckworth Books in 2024.

Zoe Brennan describes Sawyer's work as follows:

[Sawyer] demonstrates many of the narrative strategies employed by [Patricia] Wentworth and [Gladys] Mitchell, engaging, even more explicitly, with discourses of senescence. Her overt challenges to ageist attitudes are facilitated by her choice of genre and the fact that popular fiction is relatively elastic in it absorption of ideological trends. [John] Cawelti, in Adventure, Mystery, and Romance: Formula Stories as Art and Popular Culture, persuasively argues this dynamic...The reader realizes that the resources of a modern police force undercut the omnipotence of the amateur, or as [Sally] Munt puts it: "Forensic science has put paid to intuitive leaps of deduction––genetic finger-printing is far more reliable." This allows for the depiction of more human detectives than are found in earlier texts with authors providing insights into their cares and concerns.

Sawyer's earliest influence was Mary Roberts Rinehart. Rinehart is also considered the source of "the butler did it" plot device in her novel The Door (1930), although the exact phrase does not appear in her work.

== The M∗A∗S∗H studies ==
Sawyer wrote a number of popular culture articles focused on the television series M*A*S*H which aired from 1972 to 1983. The articles draw from the geographical diversity of the characters in the series, the Kilroy was Here meme from Season 4 (Episode 6--The Bus, airing 17 October 1975), and the cross-dressing of Corporal Maxwell Klinger. These include:

- Teaching from Television: M∗A∗S∗H as Geography, (with Charles O. Collins) in the Journal of Geography, 83 (1984)
- Kilroy Was Here-But He Stepped Out for a Minute! Absentee Characters in Popular Fiction (With Particular Attention to M*A*S*H), appearing in the Journal of Popular Culture, 18(2) (1984)
- Men in Skirts and Women in Trousers, from the Journal of Popular Culture, Fall 1987.

== Carlsbad by the Sea ==
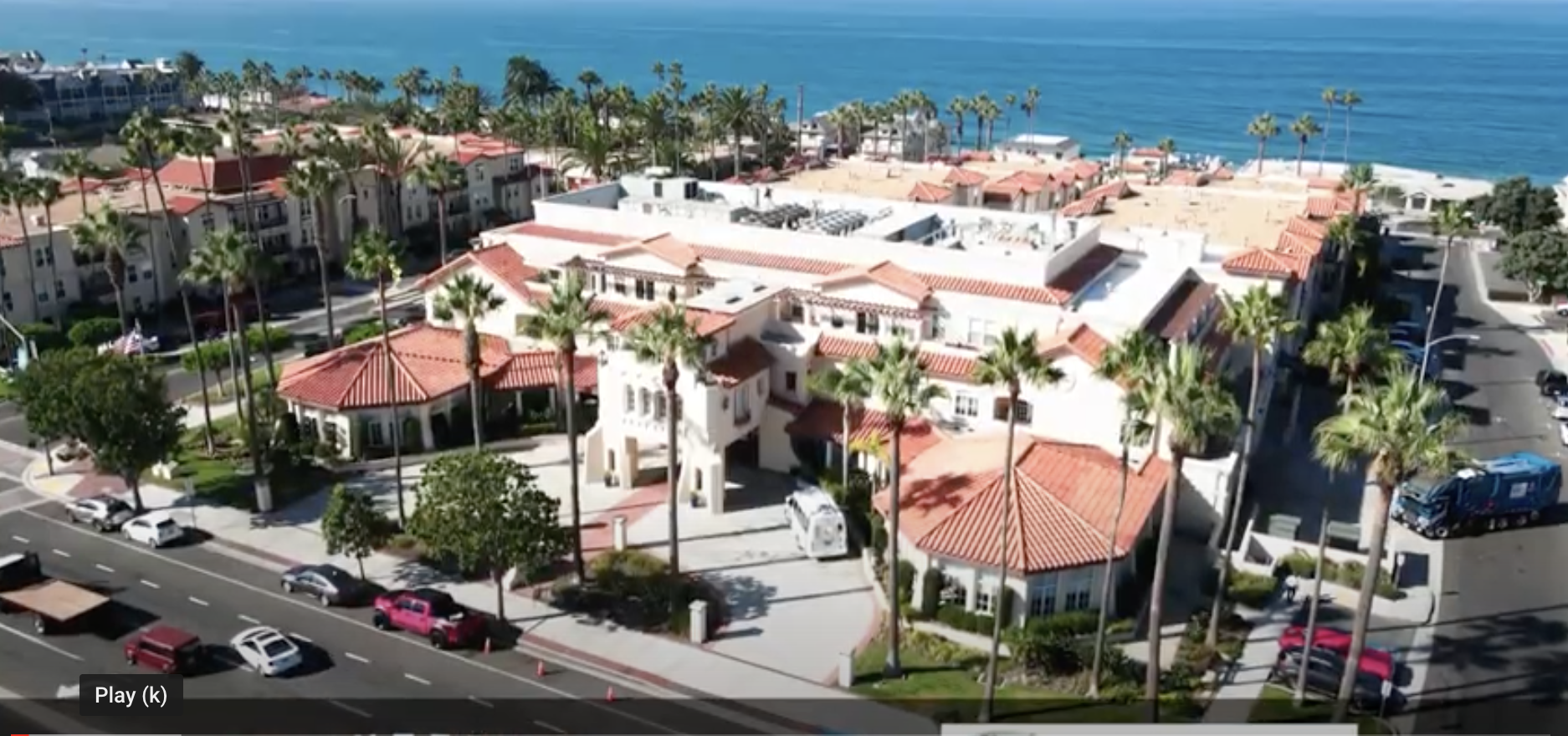
Carlsbad by the Sea

Sawyer is a long-time resident of the retirement home Carlsbad by the Sea (CBTS) upon which she based the fictional Camden-sur-Mer. CBTS is on historic U.S. Route 101 in Carlsbad, California, and dates to 29 May 1930 when the Carlsbad Mineral Springs Hotel opened, a site noted in the Historical Marker Database. The hotel served such notables as Greta Garbo, Victor McLaglan and the Barrymore family, and their rooms were in great demand by the military during World War II. In 1957, the hotel was acquired by Lutheran Services of San Diego and converted into an upscale retirement home. Sawyer's parents were among the residents starting in the late 1960s. The ageing structure was demolished in 1996 and was rebuilt as a replica of the original hotel.

When the new CBTS opened in 1997, Sawyer and her sister Madeline Campillo were among the first of the residents. She served as president of the Residents Association Board of Directors from 2008–2012. Sawyer is the resident bridge expert and was awarded Platinum Status for her volunteer activities. Each year, she has conducted a trivia contest which challenges the minds of residents and staff alike. To quote Colleen Barnett in her Mystery Women:

[Sawyer's] plots were occasionally overwhelmed by trivia, but presented a charming view of active elderly women.

== Sources ==
- Barnett, Colleen (2011). Mystery Women: An Encyclopedia of Leading Women Characters in Mystery Fiction: 1860–1979. Sourcebooks, Inc. ISBN 978-1-61595-009-6.
- Brennan, Zoe (2014). The Older Woman in Recent Fiction. McFarland. ISBN 978-0-7864-8028-9.
- Cawelti, John G. (1976). Adventure, Mystery, and Romance Formula Stories as Art and Popular Culture. University of Chicago Press. ISBN 978-0-226-09867-8.
- Howard-Jones, Marje (1982). Seekers of the Spring: A History of Carlsbad. Friends of the Carlsbad Library. ISBN 978-0-9608072-0-8.
- Lindsay, Elizabeth Blakesley (2007). Great Women Mystery Writers. Greenwood Publishing Group. ISBN 978-0-313-33428-3.
- Mitchell, Gladys (1929). Speedy Death. London: Gollancz. ISBN 978-0-7012-0682-6.
- Munt, Sally Rowena (1994). Murder by the Book? Feminism and the Crime Novel. Routledge. ISBN 978-0-415-10918-5.
- Rickert, Corinne Holt (1962). The Case of John Darrell. Minister and Exorcist. University of Florida Press.
- Rinehart, Mary Roberts (1930). The Door. Thorndike Press. ISBN 978-1-56054-462-3.
- Sawyer, Corinne Holt (1988). The J. Alfred Prufrock Murders. Thorndike Press. ISBN 978-1-56054-166-0.
- Sawyer, Corinne Holt (1989). Murder in Gray and White. Thorndike Press. ISBN 978-1-56054-159-2.
- Sawyer, Corinne Holt (1992). Murder by Owl Light. Donald I. Fine. ISBN 978-1-55611-332-1.
- Sawyer, Corinne Holt (1993). The Peanut Butter Murders. Center Point Publishing. ISBN 978-1-58547-762-3.
- Sawyer, Corinne Holt (1994). Murder Has No Calories. Fawcett Crest/Ballantine. ISBN 978-0-449-22338-3.
- Sawyer, Corinne Holt (1995). Ho-Ho Homicide. D.I. Fine. ISBN 978-1-55611-459-5.
- Sawyer, Corinne Holt (1996). The Geezer Factory Murders. Random House Publishing Group. ISBN 978-0-449-22532-5.
- Sawyer, Corinne Holt (1997). Murder Ole!. Random House Publishing Group. ISBN 978-0-449-00034-2.
- Sawyer, Corinne Holt (1998). Bed Breakfast and Bodies. Penguin Group (USA) Incorporated. ISBN 978-1-55611-543-1.
- Wentworth, Patricia (1928). Grey Mask. Warner Books. ISBN 978-0-446-30135-0.
- Whiting, Frank M., with Holt, Sawyer (1948). Huckleberry Finn, Taken From the Mark Twain Novel, Adapted for the Stage. Children's Theatre Press. ASIN B00U1KKSUQ.
