= Carlsbad by the Sea =

Continuing-care retirement community in California

Carlsbad by the Sea (CBTS)
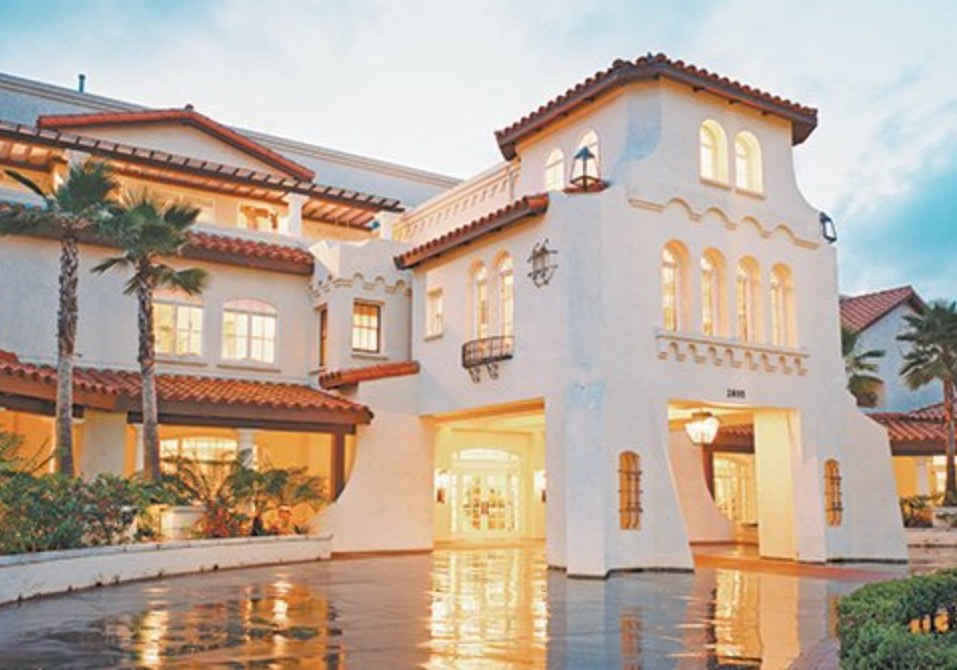
- Carlsbad by the Sea
- Location: Carlsbad, California
- Coordinates: 33°9.564′N 117°21.127′W
- Name as founded: Carlsbad Mineral Springs Hotel & Spa
- Governing body: Front Porch Communities and Services

Carlsbad by the Sea (CBTS) is a continuing-care retirement community in the city of Carlsbad, California. Its history traced back to the original mineral springs that was discovered in 1882, and was instrumental in the development of the city. The retirement community was begun in the original Carlsbad Mineral Springs Hotel & Spa which was later demolished and replicated by the current structure. The history of CBTS was commemorated in 1998 by a historical marker at its Carlsbad site.

== Early history ==
The land around Carlsbad was originally part of Rancho Agua Hedionda. In 1833, the Mexican Secularization Act had divided the area, with a Mexican land grant coming in 1842. Juan María Marrón was the original landowner of the 23,000 acre property (3 square leagues). After his death in 1853, the property was eventually divided and sold by his heirs.

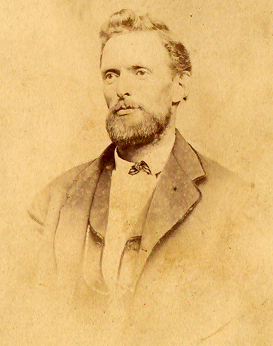
Captain John A. Frazier

Captain John A. Frazier had relocated from Rhode Island to California in 1881, eventually becoming the first postmaster of Vista, California. Frazier purchased 127 acres of oceanfront land in Ranch Agua Hedionda for farming and began drilling wells for water in 1882. He found fresh water, but also two artesian springs with mineral water that proved therapeutic for both internal and skin ailments. Two recent arrivals from the Midwest, Gerhard Schutte and Samuel Church Smith, joined him in founding the new city of Frazier Station.

Analysis showed the mineral water was very similar to the water from the world-famous Bohemian health resort (spa) of Karlsbad, and so they named their product Carlsbad Mineral Water. Frazier, Schutte and Smith built the original Carlsbad Hotel in 1887 that served as lodging and a spa to take advantage of the healing properties of the mineral springs. The founders also built their large homes (that are now the historic sites of the Twin Inns and the Magee House) in addition to the hotel and spa near to the minerals wells. They also renamed the town from Frazier Station to Carlsbad after their now well-known product, the California Carlsbad Mineral Water.

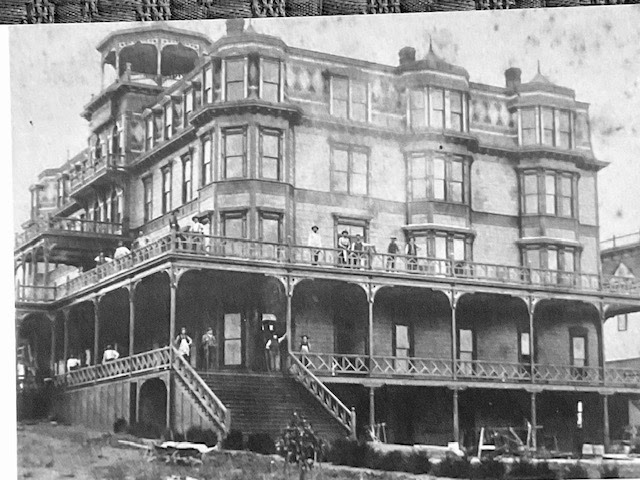
The original Carlsbad Hotel, built 1887

By 1887, the town had grown to the point where it got its own Santa Fe Railroad depot, serving passengers between Los Angeles and San Diego. Frazier built a 51-foot well tower and promoted his water's healing properties, selling his water to the passengers during the stopovers. Due to the town being confused with Carlsbad, New Mexico, the town's name and rail station's sign was changed to Carl in 1907, but strong sentiment from locals caused the name to be changed back to Carlsbad in 1917. The Carlsbad Village Station replaced the original Carlsbad Santa Fe Depot, listed on the National Register of Historic Places, when it was retired in 1960.

Frazier's mineral spring site is located on historic U.S. Route 101 (known in town as Carlsbad Boulevard), and includes a plaque noted in the Historical Marker Database. There are eight other historical markers located within walking range of the site, in what is known as the Carlsbad Village. The mineral springs are also within walking distance to an El Camino Real mission bell, a network of mission bells erected in the early 1900s to replicate route of the 1769–1770 Portolá expedition of Franciscan missionaries that was led by Junípero Serra.

== Carlsbad Mineral Springs Hotel & Spa ==
The original property on the mineral springs site was an eighty-five room, four-story hotel and spa called simply the Carlsbad Hotel. Described as “elegant and commodious," this was Carlsbad's first hotel, opening in late 1887. The hotel drew thousands from across the country, including tourists and “health seekers,” attracted by the fine beaches, easy railroad transportation, and the mineral water. In 1896, the hotel burned to the ground. Some suspected arson, but no charges were ever filed.

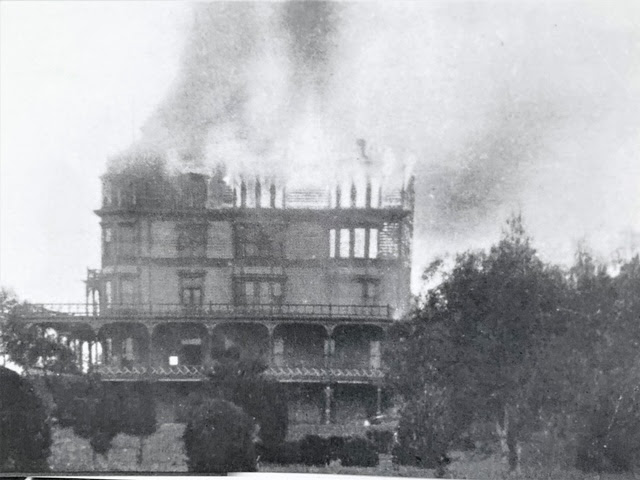
Carlsbad Hotel destroyed by fire, 1896

Shortly thereafter, the real estate bubble in Southern California burst. Real estate agents quit bringing special excursion trains to Carlsbad. Land prices slid throughout San Diego County and the site remained dormant for decades.

After the paving of Highway 101 in 1929, the luxurious 130-room California-Carlsbad Mineral Springs Hotel & Spa was begun across the street from the mineral springs. The hotel was located on 100 feet of oceanfront of the Carlsbad State Beach on property originally owned by Frazier. The opening of the Spanish-Revival style hotel and spa dates to 29 May 1930. The opening came only a few weeks after the completion of Carlsbad's first sewage system, and in 1942 the first fire station in northern San Diego County opened near the mineral springs. The California Division of Forestry (now CAL FIRE) occupied the building until 1973 when California State Parks acquired it. In 1952, Carlsbad was incorporated to avoid annexation by the city of Oceanside. The hotel and spa served such notables as Greta Garbo, Victor McLaglan, Leo Carrillo and the Barrymore family. Silent film actors Mary Pickford and Douglas Fairbanks were long-time visitors to Oceanside, just to the north, and also stayed at the hotel. John Wayne visited the hotel during the filming of Sands of Iwo Jima, a 1949 film that included sets at Camp Pendleton. The rooms of the hotel were in great demand by military officers during World War II.

Los Angeles nightclub owner Baron Long, owner of the Agua Caliente Racetrack in Tijuana, Mexico, was a patron of the hotel along with Hollywood celebrities who went to Mexico to enjoy gambling, horse racing and alcohol which were illegal in California. Mexican president Lázaro Cárdenas outlawed gambling in 1935, closing the resort and casino. About the same time, California legalized parimutuel wagering and several investor groups worked to open racetracks. The first horse racing track to open was Santa Anita Park in 1934. Shortly thereafter in 1936, the Del Mar Racetrack was built south of Carlsbad, with founding member Bing Crosby providing leadership as well as frequenting the Carlsbad Mineral Springs Hotel & Spa.

The hotel prospered for the first years, but it floundered as the Great Depression progressed. It went through a series of owners and was last purchased by Albert Mendex in 1953. By that time, the new Interstate 5 had opened, taking traffic away from the coastal highway. The hotel went into bankruptcy a year later.

== Carlsbad by the Sea ==
The Carlsbad by the Sea retirement home had its roots in the Carlsbad Mineral Springs Hotel & Spa, which it assumed operation in the late 1950s. The retirement community, rebuilt in new facilities, is now owned by Front Porch Communities and Services which owns and operates four such communities in San Diego County, four in Los Angeles/Orange County, two in the Central Coast/Monterey area, five in the San Francisco area, two in Sonoma County and one each in Louisiana and Florida.

=== Background ===
In 1956, the hotel was in bankruptcy and was available for purchase for $450,000. An offer was made by Lutheran Services of San Diego (LSSD), but there were financing problems. Virginia and Arthur Nicolet had visited the home and took a deed for $50,000, later becoming the first residents of the new community.

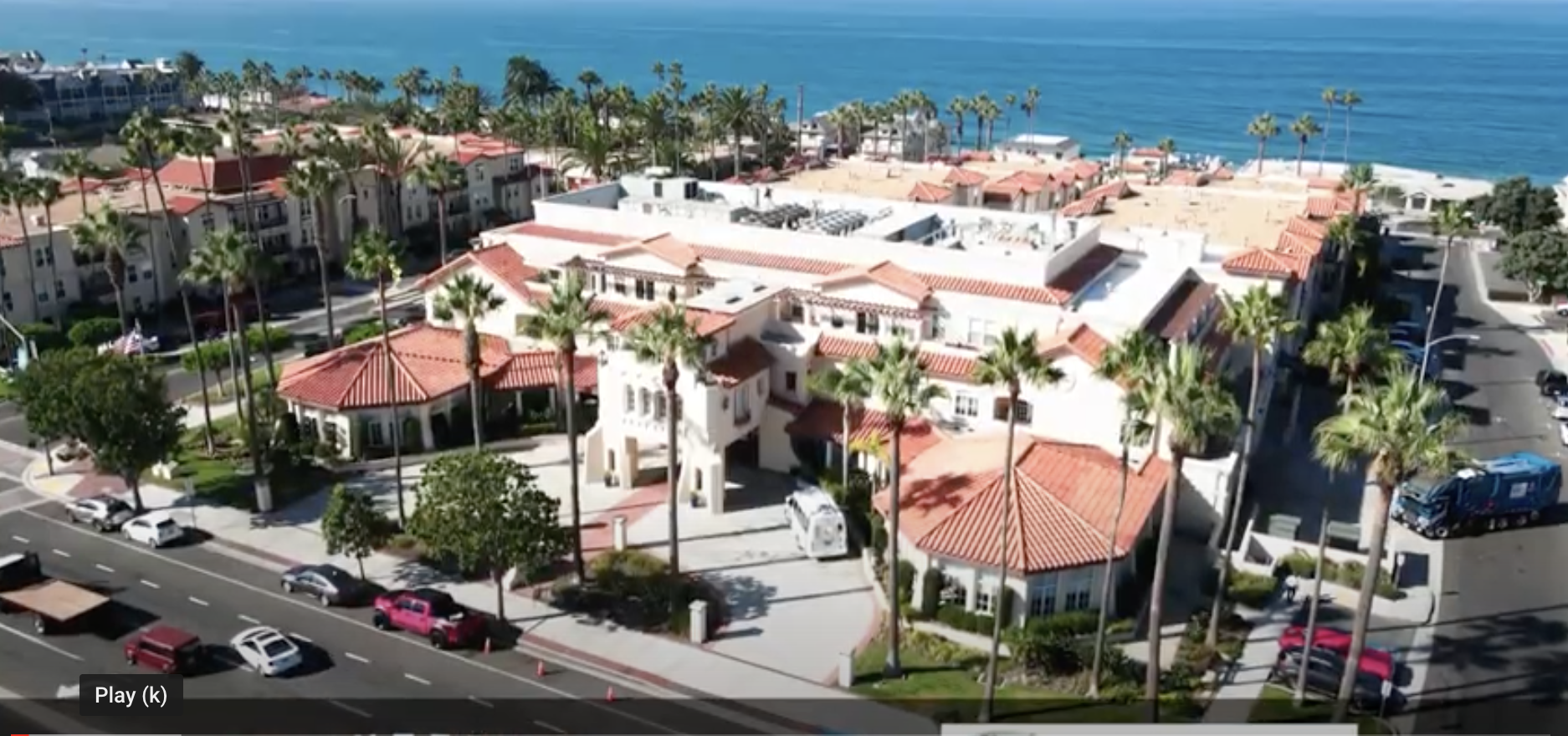
Overhead view of the main Carlsbad by the Sea facility in 2020

On 3 January 1957, the hotel was acquired by LSSD and converted into the upscale retirement home known as CBTS. Six cottages were added to the west side of the property. The first of these, closest to the ocean, was taken by the Nicolets. Financial problems abounded, and the property was taken over by California Lutheran Homes (CLH) on 1 January 1964. The facility was expanded to include a 50-bed Care Center across the street, which was dedicated in February 1975.

After the Northridge earthquake of 1994, the California legislature began requiring seismic retrofits on older buildings and, after rejecting other options, the decision was made to stay at the Carlsbad Village location. The CBTS facilities were demolished and rebuilt in 1997 reflecting the original design. The cottages were not kept, but rather the north and south wings were extended west. CBTS soon became a fully-capable Continuing Care Retirement Community with a Five-Star Medicare Rating.

The location commemorated by a historical plaque that reads in part:

In 1929...construction began on the Spanish-Revival style "California-Carlsbad Mineral Springs Hotel" on this site. By 1939, the spa functions has ceased and the hotel changed owners several times. In 1957, Lutheran Services of San Diego purchased and re-opened the hotel as a retirement community. California Lutheran Homes acquired the community in 1964. The original building was demolished in 1996 to complete an expansion and modernization of the retirement community. The front facade has been reconstructed by the California Lutheran Homes and Community Services as a replica of the original "California-Carlsbad Mineral Springs Hotel". A time capsule buried behind this monument will be opened 50 years from ground breaking in October of 2046.

=== Current Facilities ===
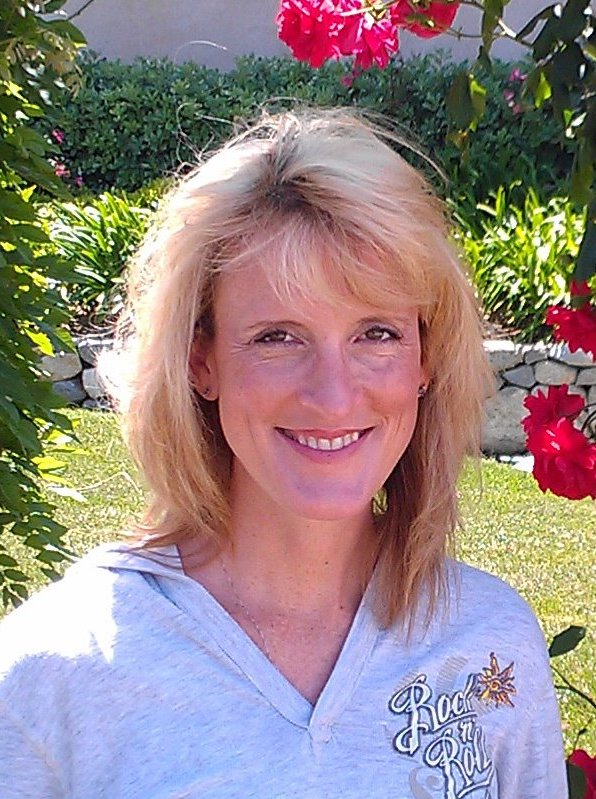
Paula Digerness, executive director of CBTS

As of October 2022, CBTS includes three buildings on 3.8 acres of oceanfront property that serves 200 residents, of which approximately 160 are independent living, and the rest in assisted living or in the Care Center. The nearby Summerhouse Memory Care facility is under development with an expected operational date of 2027. The retirement community is now under the management umbrella of Front Porch Communities and Services. The executive director is Paula Digerness, who was named in April 2022. Digerness previously held the same position at the Front Porch facility of Villa Gardens in Pasadena, California. Prior to that she was executive director of Seabrook Senior Living in Tinton Falls, New Jersey, and Royal Oaks Senior Living, a Human Good community, in Bradbury, California. Residents of note include Dr. Corinne Holt Sawyer and Dr. Roger Sedjo.

=== Technology for Seniors ===
CBTS participates in the technology insertion program run by Front Porch called the Center for Innovation and Wellbeing. The center is part of a program called Humanly Possible® whose goal is to integrate cause-based innovation into Front Porch's communities. The objective of the program is to harness new ideas to creatively meet the needs of the residents. Some representative programs include:

- A web portal called Concierge that provides directory services, master schedule, menus and other items of general interest
- Pioneering use of the voice assistant Alexa with home automation, available to all residents
- MyCommunity, an Alexa Skills Kit that integrates voice with Concierge
- Service robots at two communities, implementing the Bear Robotics Servi platform to support dining services
- Virtual reality therapy and vision enhancement
- Chatbots and other therapeutic robotics, such as PARO, an interactive robotic seal, are also being investigated.

In general, the application of augmented reality and robotics to retirement communities is showing promise with Front Porch implementing many of the promising technologies.

== See also ==
- Town of Water: Natural Springs of Carlsbad Originally Drew Settlers in 1880s. Los Angeles Times. 30 January 1992.
- Twin Inns, original house of Gerhard Schutte
- Magee House, original house of Samuel Church Smith
- St. Michael's by-the-Sea Episcopal Church
- Heritage Hall, Carlsbad's first city hall and police station.

== Bibliography ==
- "Frazier's Station (Carlsbad, CA)". britannica.com. 2021.
- Howard-Jones, Marje (1982). Seekers of the Spring: A History of Carlsbad. Friends of the Carlsbad Library. ISBN 9780960807208.
- "Carlsbad, California". worldatlas.com. 2022.
