= John A. Frazier =

American merchant seaman and farmer

Captain John A. Frazier
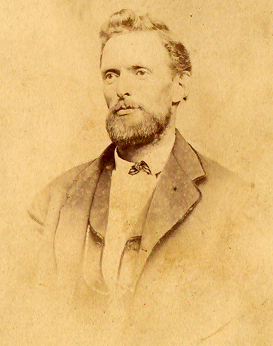
- Born: John Aldridge Frazier; July 18, 1833; Westerly, Rhode Island
- Died: July 16, 1899 (aged 65); Carlsbad, California
- Occupations: Merchant seaman, farmer and city founder
- Writing career
- Notable works: Carlsbad Mineral Springs and Spa

Captain John Aldridge Frazier (July 18, 1833 – July 16, 1899) was a merchant seaman and farmer who was one of the founders of the city of Carlsbad, California. His discovery of artesian springs with mineral water led to the creation of the Carlsbad Mineral Springs Hotel & Spa.

== Biography ==
John A. Frazier was born in Westerly, Rhode Island, going to sea with his uncle at the age of thirteen. He was issued his U.S Seaman's Protection Certificate in 1855 and served as a merchant seaman. He married his first wife in Lake County, California in 1862. He moved his family to Nye County, Nevada where he was a Justice of the Peace until 1868. His wife died post-partum after their 9th child. In 1881, he moved with and his second wife and six children to the area that would become Vista, California. He applied to open a post office in September 1882, as the closest post offices were in Encinitas or near the Mission San Luis Rey de Francia. Post offices at that time named for the area, and he applied under the name Frazier’s Crossing. The name was rejected, as there already was a Frazier in California, as was Buena Vista. Vista was the name finally permitted and Frazier became the first postmaster of Vista in October 1882. He served until November 1886.

== Carlsbad Mineral Springs ==
After moving to California, Frazier purchased 127 acres of oceanfront land for $1200 in what was then Rancho Agua Hedionda. In 1833, the Mexican Secularization Act had divided the area, with a Mexican land grant coming in 1842. While drilling for fresh water for his farm in 1882, Frazier sank three wells: at 415 feet, 450 feet, and 510 feet deep. He found fresh water, but also two artesian springs with mineral water that proved therapeutic for both internal and skin ailments. Recent arrivals from the Midwest, Gerhard Schutte and Samuel Church Smith, joined him in founding the new city of Frazier Station. They built an 85-room hotel and spa on this property that drew thousands from across the country. The hotel burned down in 1896, but the mineral water continued to be bottled and sold all over the country.

Analysis showed the mineral water was very similar to the water from the world-famous Bohemian health resort (spa) of Karlsbad, and so they named their product Carlsbad Mineral Water. The founders built large homes (now known as the Twin Inns and the Magee House) and in addition to the hotel and spa near to the minerals wells. They also renamed the town from Frazier Station to Carlsbad after the famous California Carlsbad Mineral Water. By 1887, the town had grown to the point where it got its own California Southern Railroad (later Santa Fe) depot, serving passengers between Los Angeles and San Diego. Frazier built a 51-foot well tower and promoted his water's healing properties, selling his water to the passengers during the stopovers. Due to the town being confused with Carlsbad, New Mexico, the town’s name and rail station’s sign was changed to Carl in 1907, but strong sentiment from locals caused the name to be changed back to Carlsbad in 1917. The Carlsbad Village Station replaced the original Carlsbad Santa Fe Depot, listed on the National Register of Historic Places, when it was retired in 1960.

Frazier's mineral spring site is located on historic Highway 101 (known there as Carlsbad Boulevard) and include a plaque noted in the Historical Marker Database. There are eight other historical markers located within walking range of the site, in what is known as the Carlsbad Village. This includes the first church in Carlsbad, St. Michael's By-the-Sea Episcopal Church, which was built in 1894 and is located across Highway 101 from the mineral spring. The mineral springs are also within walking distance to an El Camino Real mission bell, a network of mission bells established in the early 1900s to replicate the 1768 Portolá expedition of Franciscan missionaries led by Junípero Serra.

The mineral water made Carlsbad world famous for many years until the Great Depression, and because of lack of maintenance, the wells broke down. The wells needed repair and, lacking the funds, they were lost for sixty years. In 1993, restoration of the well was begun by Ludvik Grigoras, a native of Karlovy Vary, Czech Republic, the sister-city of Carlsbad. He also re-drilled another of Frazier's wells which turned out to be naturally carbonated. Ludvik encouraged renowned Czech sculptor Vaclav Lokvenc to create a 13-foot bronze statue of Frazier which was shipped from Europe in 1994 and was erected at the historical site. The mineral springs was reopened after 110 years during a ceremony on 24 July 1994. Today the famous therapeutic water is being bottled again as Carlsbad Alkaline Water. A spa can be found in the European-style building at Alt Karlsbad, a replica of a German Hanseatic house, located on Carlsbad Boulevard.

== Carlsbad Mineral Springs Hotel & Spa ==
After the paving of Highway 101 in 1929, the luxurious 130-room California-Carlsbad Mineral Springs Hotel & Spa was begun across the street from the mineral springs. The hotel is located on the oceanfront of the Carlsbad State Beach. The opening of the Spanish-Revival style hotel and spa dates to 29 May 1930. The location commemorated by a historical plaque that reads in part:

In 1929...construction began on the Spanish-Revival style "California-Carlsbad Mineral Springs Hotel" on this site. By 1939, the spa functions has ceased and the hotel changed owners several times. In 1957, Lutheran Services of San Diego purchased and re-opened the hotel as a retirement community. California Lutheran Homes acquired the community in 1964. The original building was demolished in 1996 to complete an expansion and modernization of the retirement community. The front facade has been reconstructed by the California Lutheran Homes and Community Services as a replica of the original "California-Carlsbad Mineral Springs Hotel". A time capsule buried behind this monument will be opened 50 years from ground breaking in October of 2046.

The hotel/spa served such notables as Greta Garbo, Victor McLaglan, Leo Carrillo, and the Barrymore family, and their rooms were in great demand by the military during World War II. In 1957, the hotel was acquired by Lutheran Services of San Diego and converted into an upscale retirement home. The hotel was demolished and rebuilt in 1997 reflecting the original design. It is now known as the Carlsbad by the Sea (CBTS) retirement home.

== Bibliography ==
- Britannica (2021). Frazier's Station (Carlsbad, CA).
- Howard-Jones, Marje (1982). Seekers of the Spring: A History of Carlsbad. Friends of the Carlsbad Library. ISBN 9780960807208.
- Worldatlas (2022). Carlsbad, California.
