= Knitting in literature =

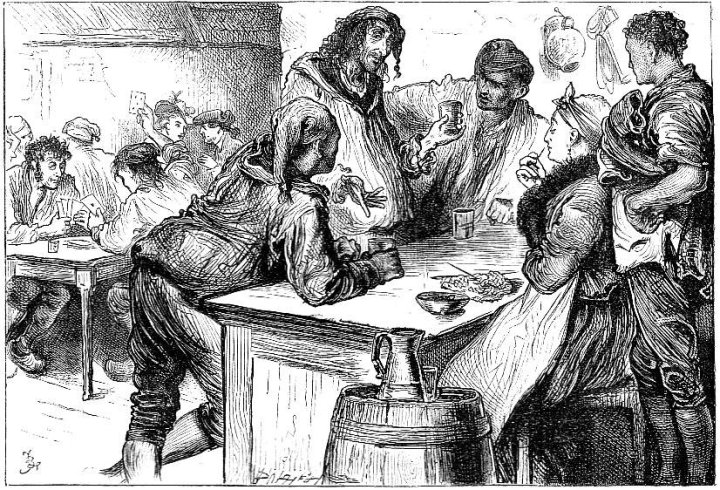
One of the best-known knitters in literature: the sinister Madame Defarge sits with her knitting, her husband behind her, in Charles Dickens' 1859 novel A Tale of Two Cities. Illustration by Fred Barnard.

Knitting has appeared in literature since at least the 1700s, and a dedicated subgenre called Knit Lit emerged in the 1990s. Knitting is equally well-established in a murder mystery subgenre. Among the best-known are the sinister Madame Defarge in Charles Dickens' 1859 novel A Tale of Two Cities, and the two fateful knitters in Joseph Conrad's 1899 novella Heart of Darkness, who may recall the Fates of classical mythology. Authors have employed knitting for multiple other themes, including Virginia Woolf's use of it as a metaphor for writing. Knitting has been seen as overwhelmingly a woman's activity, enabling the creation of comic male knitters like J. K. Rowling's Albus Dumbledore.

== History ==
Knitting has appeared in fiction literature since at least the 1700s, though mostly as a relatively minor aspect of the narrative. The 1990s saw the emergence of a dedicated subgenre called "Knit Lit" (or "Knit Fic") where knitting is a central feature.

== Knit Lit ==
=== Influences and subgenres ===
Jo Turney writes that the Knit Lit genre has two broad subcurrents: murder mystery and chick lit. There are recurring tropes within the genre, including the so-called sweater curse, where knitting a piece of clothing for one's partner results in the end of the romantic relationship. Turney comments that modern Knit Lit mysteries show an influence from two earlier knitting detective characters: Agatha Christie's Miss Marple and Patricia Wentworth's Miss Silver, both elderly women. Michelle Hanks comments that while knitting is treated as a "sign of creativity", the genre has a distinctly traditional worldview.

=== Increased significance ===
Laurence Rousillon-Constanty and Rachel Dickinson write that in 21st century Knit Lit, the created work has become far more significant in the narrative, and is accordingly described in much more detail, than the cursory mentions of knitting in novels of the 19th and 20th centuries. Amy Wells comments that both Jane Austen's Elizabeth Bennet, in her 1813 novel Pride and Prejudice, and Agatha Christie's Miss Marple are presented as knitting, without precise detail of the objects being made. Thus, Wells writes, Christie's "'I mean', said Miss Marple, puckering her brow a little as she counted the stitches in her knitting, 'that ...'" in the 1932 short story "The Tuesday Night Club" allows the character to speak unthreateningly "framed within a feminized, acceptable activity." Similarly, Austen's "Elizabeth took up some needlework, and was sufficiently amused in attending to what passed between Darcy and his companion" show, Wells writes, that the knitting is taking place with others present, allowing her to observe the activities unobtrusively under cover of the craftwork. Wells contrasts this with the knitting in modern American writing, such as Penny Reid's fiction, where her character Elizabeth Finney in the 2013 Friends Without Benefits generously gives away her work, forming a core element of the story: "Between large projects I frequently knit hats for the hospital’s newborns. They were fast, and I had the pattern memorized. It also gave me a little thrill to see the hats on the infants as they left the maternity ward."

== Themes ==
=== Gender ===
[T]he iconology of the knitting woman, as outlined in fiction, can be understood as an allegory for femininity and the wiles of womanhood, through attributes such as innocuousness, diligence, thrift, handwork and storytelling.

— Jo Turney, 2010,

Knitting has been culturally associated with women since the late 1700s—when it became common as a recreational middle-class activity—and this is reflected in literature. One of the functions of literary characters knitting is as a signifier of femininity, and the modern Knit Lit genre is targeted mainly towards a female readership. Learning to knit from one's mother also serves as a symbolic rite of passage from girlhood to womanhood in many works; in George Eliot's 1861 novel Silas Marner, a woman laments not having a daughter to teach in this way. Rejection of traditional femininity occasionally manifests as refusal to knit, as in Louisa May Alcott's 1868 novel Little Women. The novelist Alison Lurie observed that knitting as a productive activity was used in literature to signify virtue of female characters like Jane Fairfax and Miss Bates in Jane Austen's Emma (1816), Hester Prynne in Nathaniel Hawthorne's The Scarlet Letter (1850) and Lenin's wife Kitty in Leo Tolstoy's Anna Karenina (1878), while negatively portrayed characters were given more frivolous pastimes like fine netting or crochetting. Douglas Kerr states that knitting is so overwhelmingly seen in literature as a gendered activity that when a male character knits, it makes him a comic figure, the combination of knitting and maleness being "anomalous, freakish, and farcical". He gives as instances the "ludicrous" ambassador Sir Sampson Courtenay in Evelyn Waugh's 1932 novel Black Mischief, and the "eccentric" Albus Dumbledore in J. K. Rowling's 1997–2007 Harry Potter book series.

=== Malevolence ===
According to Kim Adrian, "knitters in literature tend to be a crackpot lot". Adrian proposes three possible explanations for knitters often being portrayed negatively: the time-consuming and repetitive nature of knitting implying "a dangerous level of patience", knitting's association with crones making it a target for sexist and ageist attitudes, and a general rejection of perceived Luddite tendencies. One example of such a malevolent knitter—according to Lurie, "the most famous and sinister knitter in literature"—is the character of Madame Defarge in Charles Dickens's 1859 novel A Tale of Two Cities, who encodes the names of those she wishes to die by the guillotine during the French Revolution into her knitting; Zeynab Warsame of The Believer magazine comments that this symbolic connection between yarn and death resembles that of the Fates in Greek mythology.

=== Camouflaging women as harmless ===
Knitting sometimes serves as a way for characters to appear harmless—both to other characters and to readers. Turney and Kathy Rees both identify Miss Marple and Miss Silver as examples of this. Kerr comments that while knitting can be sinister, as with Madame Defarge, it can often be comic, as with the "harmless, slightly ridiculous old spinster of no intellectual powers" that Miss Marple outwardly seems to be.

=== As a remedy ===
Marta Kargól writes that Ann Hood's 2008 novel The Knitting Circle sees knitting as a kind of prayer, the protagonist knitting to remain connected to her daughter who has died. This reflected Hood's own experience of mourning her daughter.

=== Indicating oppression in Conrad's Heart of Darkness ===
A narrow and deserted street in deep shadow,... immense double doors standing ponderously ajar. I slipped through one of these cracks, went up a swept and ungarnished staircase, as arid as a desert, and opened the first door I came to. Two women, one fat and the other slim, sat on straw-bottomed chairs, knitting black wool. The slim one got up and walked straight at me—still knitting with downcast eyes... stood still, and looked up.

— Joseph Conrad, 1899, Heart of Darkness, chapter 1

Kathy Rees notes the emphasis that Joseph Conrad gives to the "feverish" act of knitting with his four times repeated phrase about knitting "black wool" in the 1899 novella Heart of Darkness. In her view, Conrad here makes "surprising" use of knitting "to convey aspects of colonial savagery". Cedric Watts describes the two knitters as seeming "so portentous", one almost sleepwalking, the other seated, both made sinister by the literary echo with the Fates who spin and cut the thread of everyone's life. Watts comments that Conrad scarcely needed to have the character Marlow stressing their "fateful" and "uncanny" air. A further classical echo comes with Conrad's mention that the two knitters are "guarding the door of Darkness", perhaps alluding to the Sibyl who guards the door of the Underworld in Virgil's Aeneid.

=== As a means of liberation ===
In A. S. Byatt's The Matisse Stories, the protagonist Mrs Brown is transported from her position at the bottom of society to fame and wealth by her knitting. Her abusive husband gets or steals a knitting machine for her. It becomes her "prized possession", as she uses it to make acclaimed art objects. Kathy Rees likens the rise of Mrs Brown to a scene in George Eliot's 1859 novel Adam Bede. There, a farmer's wife, Mrs Poyser, wins her confrontation with the oppressive and bullying squire Donnithorne, speaking her mind openly while "spearing" her rolled knitting with a knitting needle.

=== In the works of Virginia Woolf ===
Sayaka Okumura writes that knitting serves as a metaphor for writing in Virginia Woolf's fiction, noting that the words "text" and "textile" share etymologies. Savina Stevanato comments that in her 1925 novel Mrs Dalloway, both Clarissa Dalloway and Woolf herself as the author are "knitters of patterns", whether with wool or words: the novel is "a knitted whole" made from the multiple threads of the characters' lives, meeting and parting from each other. Stevanato writes that in Woolf's 1927 novel To the Lighthouse, the hopeful and restorative "female" act of knitting stands in opposition to the pessimistic and destructive "male" activities of war. Specifically, while knitting a "reddish brown stocking", Mrs Ramsay says, ostensibly of the weather, "it will be fine", while her husband predicts it "won't be fine".

== See also ==
- Mathematics and art#mathekniticians – the use of knitting in mathematics
