= Rancho Melijo =

Mexican land grant rancho

Coordinates: 32°35′47″N 117°05′20″W

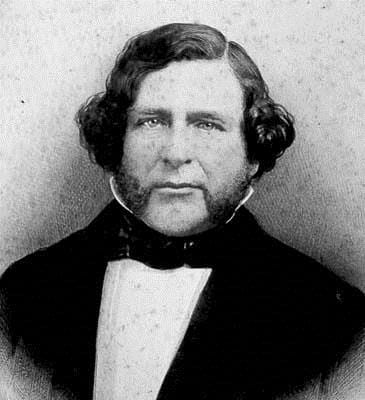
Rancho Melijo was granted to Santiago E. Argüello in 1833.

Rancho Melijo, or Milijo, was a Mexican land grant rancho, named after a local Kumeyaay village. It was later called Rancho La Punta for the location of the Arguello family ranch house, on a point of hills overlooking the south end of San Diego Bay, north of the Otay River and east of where the river entered the south bend of the bay. It was granted by Governor José Figueroa in 1833 to Santiago E. Argüello.

The rancho covered a square league of land extending 1 league north of the San Antonio Hills and one league east of the Pacific Ocean from the mouth of the Tijuana River, including its estuary and the plain east up the lower Tijuana Valley, amounting to 4,439 acres of land. The southern part of the land was adjacent to his father’s Rancho Ti Juan and Rancho San Antonio Abad It extended from the foot of the range of hills that the 1856 county map calls the San Antonio Hills just above the modern border of Mexico, to as far north as to include the south end of San Diego Bay where the Otay River entered the bay and the southern part of the hills on the north side of the Otay River.

With the cession of California to the United States following the Mexican–American War, the 1848 Treaty of Guadalupe Hidalgo provided that the land grants would be honored. As required by the Land Act of 1851, a claim for Rancho Melijo was filed with the Public Land Commission in 1852. The claim (91 SD) was rejected and failed in appeals to higher courts. The Argüello family retained some of the land, homesteading it in the vicinity of the ranch house north of the Otay River and by the bay.

The Rancho Melijo included all of modern Imperial Beach, part of southwestern Chula Vista and the Tijuana River Valley, Otay Mesa West, Nestor and Palm City, neighborhoods of southern San Diego. The ranch house fell into ruin in the 20th century and was razed to make way for Interstate 5.

== See also ==
- Ranchos of San Diego County, California
