= San Dieguito County Park =

Park in California, USA

San Dieguito County Park is a 125-acre (0.51 km^{2}) park on the border between Del Mar and Solana Beach, California, two incorporated cities in northern San Diego County. The park is split into two sections, the upper park, which opened in 1965, and the lower park, which opened in 1977.

The land for the park was originally part of a Mexican land grant to Juan María Osuna in 1840. In 1906, his heirs sold the property to serve as a eucalyptus forest for rail ties for a subsidiary of the Santa Fe Railway. The railway later sold slices of that land to create the town of Rancho Santa Fe, and some of it came under the control of the local Santa Fe Irrigation District. In 1954, it was sold one last time, for a nominal fee of $10, to San Diego County.

It is locally popular for barbecues, weddings, and other group gatherings; there are no campsites. Other facilities include a basketball court, hiking trails, a gazebo, and a playground. One border of the park is the historical El Camino Real, which is also called King's Highway and sometimes California Mission Trail.

It is home to a variety of wildlife, including the least Bell's vireo.

The Miracle League of San Diego provides an opportunity for handicapped children to play baseball. The league has spring and fall seasons at the baseball field in the park.
