= Rancho Agua Hedionda =

1842 Mexican land grant

- Mexican land grant
- Interactive map of Rancho Agua Hedionda
- Coordinates: 33.160°N 117.290°W
- Country: United States
- State: California
- County: San Diego
- Granted: 1842
- Founder: Juan María Marrón

Area
  - Total: 13,311 acres (5,387 ha)

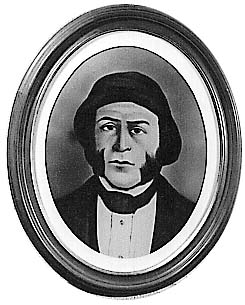
Rancho Agua Hedionda was granted to Californio Juan María Marrón in 1842.

Rancho Agua Hedionda was a 13,311-acre (53.87 km^{2}) Mexican land grant in present-day San Diego County, California, given in 1842 by Governor Juan Alvarado to Juan María Marrón. The name means "stinking water" in Spanish. The grant extended south along the Pacific Coast from present day Carlsbad to Leucadia. The grant surrounded Agua Hedionda Lagoon.

== History ==
Juan María Romouldo Marrón (1808–1853) was involved in the early politics of San Diego in the early 1820s. He married Felipa Osuna (1809-1889), daughter of Juan María Osuna, the first alcalde of the Pueblo of San Diego, and the grantee of Rancho San Dieguito. Juan María Marrón was granted the three square league Rancho Agua Hedionda in 1842. During the Mexican-American War, Marrón's support of the Americans caused him considerable difficulties with many of his Mexican friends. His son Sylvester married Leonora Osuna, and his daughter, María Luz, married José María Estudillo.

With the cession of California to the United States following the Mexican-American War, the 1848 Treaty of Guadalupe Hidalgo provided that the land grants would be honored. As required by the Land Act of 1851, a claim for Rancho Agua Hedionda was filed with the Public Land Commission in 1852, and the grant was patented to Juan María Marrón in 1872 (patent No. 521).

Juan Marrón died in 1853, and left Rancho Agua Hedionda to his widow and children. The heirs leased Rancho Agua Hedionda to Francis Hinton in 1860. Francis J. Hinton (1818–1870) was born Abraham T.E.D. Hornbeck in New York and came to California with the US Army forces occupying California following the Mexican–American War. He was a sergeant in the same unit as Cave Johnson Couts, who later to become the owner of Rancho Guajome. Hinton had a very large interest in the famous Vulture Mine in Arizona. In 1860, Hinton acquired Rancho Agua Hedionda. Hinton, a bachelor, died in 1870, and left Rancho Agua Hedionda to his mayordomo Robert Kelly.

Robert Kelly (1825–1890) was a native of the Isle of Man who came to the United States with his family in 1841, and arrived in San Diego early in 1851. He was an ownership partner and mayordomo of Rancho Jamacha. After selling his interest in Rancho Jamacha in 1858, Kelly was a merchant in San Diego until in 1860, when he acquired Rancho Agua Hedionda. Kelly, also a bachelor, died in 1890, and left Rancho Agua Hedionda to the nine children of his older brother, Matthew Kelly. The Kelley family divided the Rancho in 1896.

== Historic sites of the Rancho ==
- Marron Adobe. Adobe built by the Marron family.
