= Leucadia, Encinitas, California =

Leucadia
- Neighborhood of Encinitas
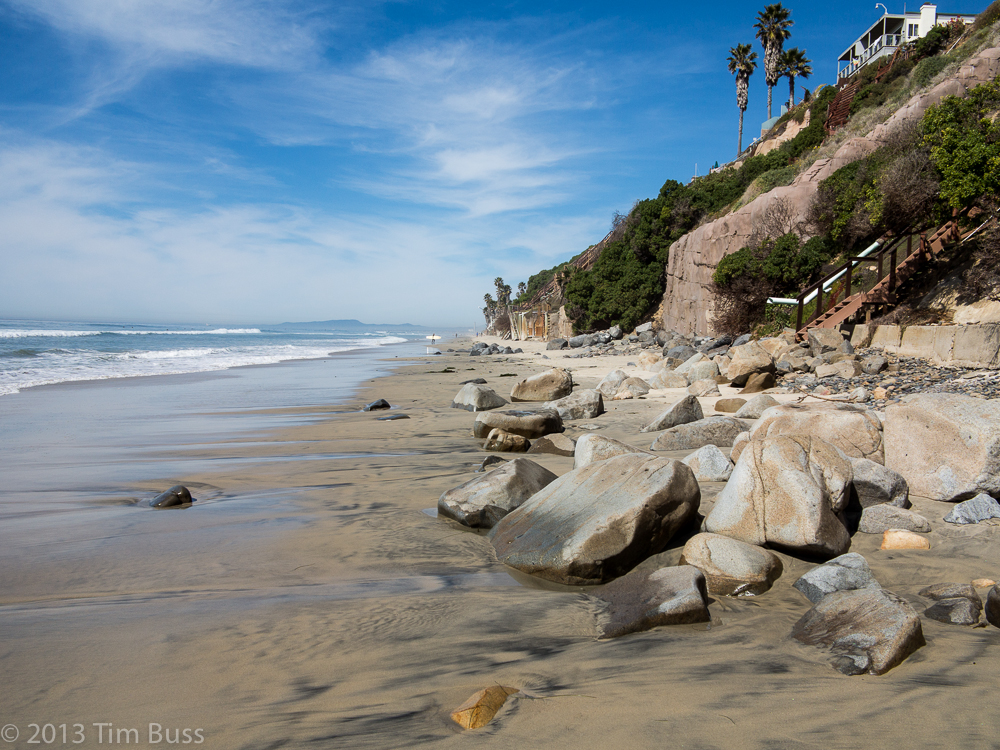
- Beacon's Beach
- Interactive map of Leucadia
- Coordinates: 33°04′05″N 117°18′12″W
- Country: United States
- State: California
- County: San Diego
- City: Encinitas
- Founded: circa 1870
- Elevation: 62 ft (19 m)
- Time zone: UTC-8 (PST)
  - Summer (DST): UTC-7 (PDT)
- ZIP code: 92024
- Area codes: 442/760

Leucadia is a beach community in the coastal city of Encinitas, California. It is known for its relatively secluded beaches in Southern California surf culture.

== History ==
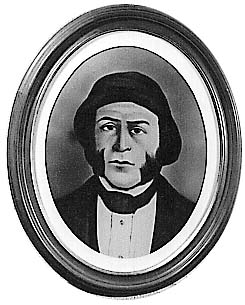
Rancho Agua Hedionda was granted to Juan María Marrón in 1842, encompassing modern-day Leucadia.

The name Leucadia is of Greek origin as its namesake, Lefkada (Leucada), is one of the Ionian Islands. Early in the community's history, a development company based in San Diego gave Leucadia and its streets their Greco-Roman names, which include Hymettus, Neptune, Phoebe, and Daphne. The community of Leucadia became part of the city of Encinitas when it incorporated in 1986.

== Geography ==
Leucadia faces the Pacific Ocean. The community is set on a series of bluffs that stretch along much of the length of the North County coastline, a region of San Diego County. Its beaches are located below steep vertical cliffs lending them a relative seclusion.

== Economy ==
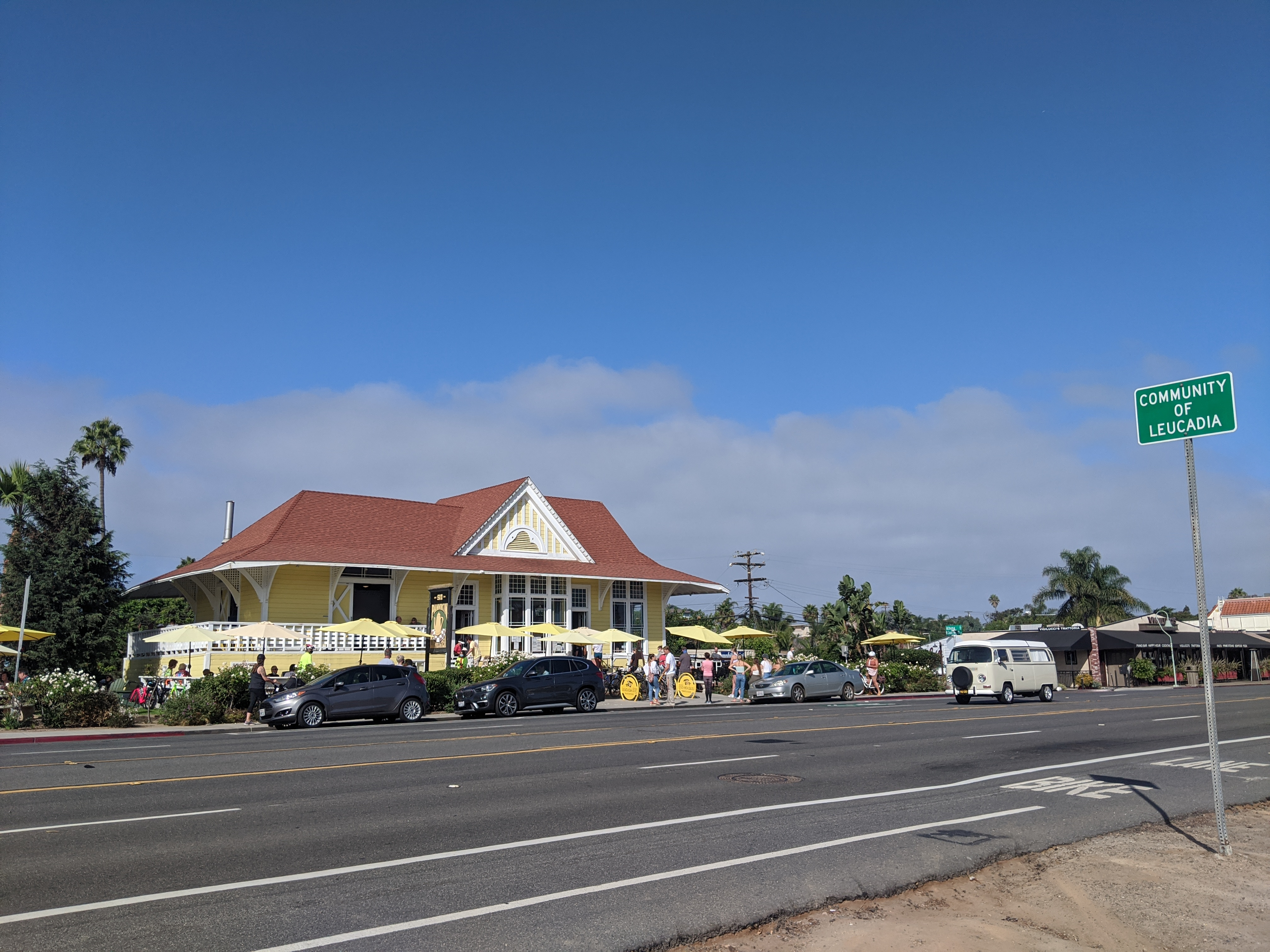
The Pannikin tea and coffee shop is one of Leucadia's most prominent businesses. It is housed in the original Encinitas depot built by the California Southern Railroad in the 1880s.

In 2003, the Leucadia 101 Main Street Association was created to enhance the economic and civic vitality of Leucadia's Historic North Coast Highway 101 corridor. Notable businesses include Pannikin Coffee & Tea, Haggo's Organic Taco, featured on Food Network's Diners, Drive-Ins, and Dives television show, local-favorite Juanitas Taco Shop, Corner Pizza, in addition to Shatto & Sons—which has been in Leucadia since 1975, a custom t-shirt shop known for their "Keep Leucadia Funky" t-shirts.
