= California Land Act of 1851 =

Concerned pre-statehood land titles in California

The California Land Act of 1851 (9 Stat. 631), enacted following the Treaty of Guadalupe Hidalgo and the admission of California as a state in 1850, established a temporary commission to adjudicate the validity of prior statehood Spanish and Mexican land grants. The law reversed US guarantees by the Treaty of Guadalupe Hidalgo that guaranteed full protection of all property rights for Mexican citizens. Instead claimants were responsible to file their claim with the commission within two years.

The commission confirmed 604 of the 813 claims, but appeals in many instances resulted in protracted litigation. Claimants would sell or trade their land to finance their legal pursuits. A few cases were litigated into the 1940s.

== Legislation ==
California senator William M. Gwin's legislation establishing this process became law on March 3, 1851.

That for the purpose of ascertaining and settling private land claims in the State of California, a commission shall be, and is hereby, constituted, which shall consist of three commissioners, to be appointed by the President of the United States, by and with the advice and consent of the Senate, which commission shall continue for three years from the date of this act, unless sooner discontinued by the President of the United States.

The Act established a three-member Board of Land Commissioners, to be appointed by the president for a three-year term; the period of existence was twice extended by Congress to five-years. The Act required all claimants of Spanish and Mexican land grants to present their claim within two years for a commission ruling. Failure not to file within two years would result in the land ownership by default passing into the public domain. The Act required the Commissioners to use Mexican property law instead of United States property law because of pre-existing property rights that existed prior to the Treaty of Guadalupe Hidalgo. This was affirmed by the Supreme Court in States v. Andres Castillero.

This validation process was contrary to Article Eight of the Treaty of Guadalupe Hidalgo, that the United States agreed to respect the hundreds of land grants, many quite substantial, granted by the Spanish and Mexican governments to private landowners. Articles Nine and Ten guaranteed the property rights of Mexican nationals.

== Hearings ==
The land commission opened its sessions at San Francisco on January 2, 1852. It consisted, by appointment of President Millard Fillmore, of Hiland Hall, Harry I. Thornton, and James Wilson as commissioners. In 1853 President Franklin Pierce changed the board by the appointment of Alpheus Felch, Thompson Campbell and R. Augustus Thompson as commissioners. Their commissions would, in accordance with the terms of the act, have expired in March 1854; but previous to that time the operation of its provisions as to their power to act was extended for one year longer and again for another year. In 1854, Peter Lott was appointed commissioner in place of Campbell; and in 1855 S. B. Farwell was appointed commissioner in place of Lott. On March 3, 1856, five years after the passage of the original act, the board finally adjourned sine die.

=== Land records ===
American officials acquired the provincial land records of the Spanish and Mexican governments in the capital at Monterey. The new state's leaders understood that the Mexican government had given a number of grants to Californios just prior to American control, rewarding faithful supporters and hoping to prevent the most recent American arrivals from gaining control of the land. Some earlier American immigrants had received land grants after being naturalized as Mexican citizens.

=== Indefinite maps ===
Claimants submitted their claims and the commission examined whether grantees had met the requirements of the Mexican colonization laws; among them establishing a home on the land within one year, and submitting a map of the grant's boundaries. Exactitude was not a general characteristic of pre-statehood California land grants. Early maps (diseños), if available, were often simple sketches using vague physical landmarks. Boundary markers might be as temporary as an oak tree, a cow skull on a pile of rocks, a creek, or a mountain range.

Even in cases where the boundaries were more specific, many markers had been destroyed before surveys in the US tradition were made. While the temporary California State Lands Commission confirmed 604 of the 813 claims presented, most decisions were appealed to US District Court and some to the Supreme Court. The confirmation process required lawyers, translators, and surveyors, and took an average of 17 years (including the Civil War, 1861–1865) to resolve. It proved expensive for landholders to defend their titles through the court system. In many cases, they had to sell a portion of their land to pay for defense fees, or to give attorneys land in lieu of cash payment.

=== Conflicting claims ===
Lands under Spanish and Mexican land titles that were rejected by the courts entered the public domain. This resulted in conflicting claims by the grantees, squatters, and settlers seeking the same land. Congress was pressured to change the law. Under the earlier Preemption Act of 1841, squatters were able to pre-empt others' claims to land and acquire clear title by paying $1.25 an acre for up to a maximum of 160 acres (0.65 km^{2}). After the federal Homestead Act of 1862 was passed, anyone could claim up to 160 acres (0.65 km^{2}) of public land. This resulted in additional pressure on Congress, and beginning with Rancho Suscol in 1863, it passed special acts that allowed certain claimants to pre-empt their land without regard to acreage. By 1866 this privilege was extended to all owners of rejected claims.

=== Border grants remaining in Mexico ===
A number of ranchos remained largely whole in the sliver of Alta California that Mexico retained under the Treaty of Guadalupe Hidalgo, which became part of Baja California. Rancho Tía Juana lost the title to its land in San Diego County but the balance of the rancho in Mexico was confirmed by the Mexican government in the 1880s. Rancho El Rosario, Rancho Cueros de Venado and Rancho Tecate were each granted to citizens of San Diego in the 1820s or 1830s and lay wholly in what is now Baja California as was the Rancho San Antonio Abad, whose origin and title is more obscure. Their titles were never subjected to dispute in U.S. courts.

Juana Briones, whose early life started with her selling milk in Yerba Buena (today San Francisco), became the owner of Rancho La Purísima Concepción in Santa Clara County. The rancho had been part of Mission Santa Clara and was granted to Gorgonio, a well-respected Indian of that mission. Juana was a friend of Gorgonio and his family bought the 4,400-acre rancho from Gorgonio in 1844. The rancho took in what is today Sunnyvale and Los Altos. Later, she was one of the founding members of Mayfield (today's Palo Alto), where she lived until she died in 1889.

=== California Indians ===
Although the commission was instructed and presumed to have made a report on the status of Native land claims in the region, no evidence suggests that reports were ever completed except for those at Pauma and Santa Ynez, which eventually became reservations. Other than those two settlements, the commission gathered no information about the settlements of Native people who had been on the land since time immemorial or who claimed title under Mexican or Spanish law which had recognized their prior, aboriginal claims. The 1851 Act gave two years for people to submit claims but most Native people were not made aware of the Act or its requirements, and therefore missed the opportunity to codify their title to the lands where they had always lived. The 1851 Act is therefore one of the major vehicles by which California Indians lost their ancestral lands and were made homeless when their territory passed into the public domain after the two-year deadline. The prevalence of public domain allotments in California is a direct result of these circumstances, since the government granted those allotments after realizing the problem it had created by its circumvention of Indian aboriginal title with the 1851 Act. A later court case, U.S. ex rel. Chunie v. Ringrose, held that the claims of California's Mission Indians (those removed from their ancestral homes and relocated, with other Tribes unknown to them and subject to forced labor, on California's missions) were held through the Mexican government and were therefore also subject to this Act.

=== Lengthy legal action ===
The Commission eventually confirmed 604 of the 813 claims received. John Bautista Rogers Cooper filed a claim for Rancho El Sur with the Public Land Commission in 1852 but he only received the legal land patent after years of litigation in 1866. While the majority (97%) of these cases were resolved by 1885, a few cases were litigated into the 1940s. Jose Castro filed a claim for Rancho San Jose y Sur Chiquito in 1853. He sold his land before his claim was decided. Before his case was decided, 32 others filed claims with the court that they owned a portion of his rancho. His successors litigated the claim for years. In 1882, Castro's original claim was finally validated by the court, and President Grover Cleveland signed the land patent on May 4, 1888, 35 years after Castro's initial filing.

=== Prior Land Grants ===
Article X of the Treaty of Guadalupe Hidalgo, drafted by Bernardo Couto, Miguel Aristáin, and Luis Cuevas, was intended to protect the land grants made during the Spanish and Mexican administrations in Alta California. This article established that "All grants of land, made by the Mexican Government... will be respected as valid, to the same extent as they were granted". However, the Congress of the United States eliminated this article on March 10, 1848. In its place, the Protocol of Querétaro agreement restored the validity of Mexican land grants, but only if grantees could prove their claims in U.S. courts. That requirement led to the California Land Act of 1851.

The state, however, did little to help grantees prove their claims. For example, the Act required that official proceedings in California be printed only in English, the first "English only" rule in the US that lasted until 1966. California had very few English speakers until the 1848 gold rush.

"Legal battles have continued into the 21st century over the ownership of the land grants" and many people claim their land was unfairly seized as a direct consequence of the Treaty of Guadalupe Hidalgo, which ended the Mexican-American War.

=== Restoration of Catholic missions ===
One of the more significant sets of claims was filed on February 19, 1853, on behalf of the Roman Catholic Church by Archbishop Joseph Sadoc Alemany, wherein he sought the return of all former mission lands in the State. Ownership of 1,051 acres (4.25 km^{2}) (for all practical intents being the exact area of land occupied by the original mission buildings, cemeteries, and gardens) was subsequently conveyed to the Church, along with the Cañada de los Pinos (or College Rancho) in Santa Barbara County comprising 35,500 acres (144 km^{2}), and La Laguna in San Luis Obispo County, consisting of 4,157 acres (16.82 km^{2}).

== See also ==
- Ranchos of California
- United States Court of Private Land Claims
