= Rancho San Antonio Abad =

- Land grant of Mexico
- 1828–1906
  - Type: Mexican land grant
- History
  - Established: 1828
  - Disestablished: 1906
- Today part of: Mexico

Rancho San Antonio Abad was a land grant in what is now the western part of Tijuana, in the Tijuana Municipality of Baja California, Mexico. The name of the rancho derives from Saint Anthony the Abbot.

== History ==
=== Origin ===
The origin of this rancho is obscure, but it was one of the earliest ranchos established around San Diego. It is mentioned in a report in 1828, with the various ranchos of the San Diego region, Pennasquitos, de la Nación (then the rancho of the Presidio of San Diego), San Ysidro, El Rosario and Temescal. Among them is also mentioned that of San Antonio Abad as a rancho with 300 cattle, 80 horses, 25 mules and some grain fields on it. It may have been a second rancho belonging to or used by the Presidio.

The property of the Rancho San Antonio Abad would have been bounded on the west by the Pacific Ocean, to the south by the 11 league Rancho El Rosario and from 1829, it would have been bounded on the east by the Rancho Tía Juana. It would later in 1833, be bounded on the north by the Rancho Melijo or Rancho de La Punta of Santiago E. Arguello, that lay from the line of hills south of the Tijuana River valley on the coast north to San Diego Bay. San Antonio Abad's location would put it below the modern Mexican border along where El Camino Real ran north along the coast to San Diego.

Later in 1836-37, during the time of the Kumeyaay warfare against the ranchos, this rancho was administered along with the Rancho Otay, by the same Santiago E. Arguello of Rancho Melijo, son of Santiago Arguello owner of the Rancho Tía Juana (that had been abandoned at that time due to the raids), indicating it may not yet have been in private hands at that time. Its title was never before the California Land Commission, further indicating its bounds were south of the border.

=== Post-Mexican American War ===
Following the Mexican American War, during the 1853-1854, invasion of Baja California by the filibuster William Walker his retreating force marching north along the El Camino Real to California, resting in ruined missions and abandoned ranchos along the way, finally encamped at the Rancho San Antonio Abad that lay just south of the border on the coast along the highway. There he negotiated his surrender to American officials in San Diego.

A map of the Rancho Melijo made by a county surveyor for its land commission case, indicates that the line of hills extending along the border south of the Tijuana River and down the coast into Mexico, were known as the San Antonio Hills, perhaps indicating the northern limit of the Abad rancho.

It would seem that sometime between Walker's occupation of the abandoned rancho in 1854 and 1856 Santiago Arguello had acquired the rancho. On January 2, 1856, Santiago Arguello signed a sworn statement about the legal validity of the Mexican title of the San Pascual Rancheria. At the end of the document he signed it with a statement that indicated that he was the owner and resided at the rancho San Antonio Abad:

"Given in my rancho of San Antonio Abad a Ti Juan. S. Arguello"

Rancho San Antonio Abad seems not to have been kept together under that name as it does not appear in a report of settlements and ranchos in Baja California Norte in 1906, although there are a number of ranchos named San Antonio in the area mentioned.
