= Rancho San Dieguito =

Mexican land grant in California

Coordinates: 33.030°N 117.200°W

- Land Grant
- Interactive map of Rancho San Dieguito
- Country: Mexico
- State: California
- County: San Diego
- Established: 1845
- Founder: Juan María Osuna

Rancho San Dieguito was a 8,824-acre (35.71 km^{2}) Mexican land grant in present-day San Diego County, California, given in 1845 by Governor Pío Pico to Juan María Osuna. The rancho property was renamed Rancho Santa Fe in 1922 by the Santa Fe Land Company.

== History ==
Juan Maria Osuna, son of one of the "leather-jacket soldiers", also became a soldier and for many years served at the Presidio of San Diego. Osuna played an important role in the establishment of the pueblo of San Diego (population 150) and was elected alcalde. In addition, Juan Osuna became a Justice of the Peace and was administrator of the San Diego Mission. As Mayor, one of Juan Maria Osuna's powers included the approval of petitions for land and he quite naturally approved his own application for the San Dieguito grant. In 1845, Governor Pio Pico awarded him full title to the two square league Rancho San Dieguito.

In 1806, Osuna married Maria Juliana Josepha Lopez (1791-1871). Osuna built an adobe home on the ranch for himself and his wife, and gave an existing adobe to his son, Leandro. Osuna was considered a fine alcalde but was also a gambling man and lost some of his land to pay off bad debts. Leandro Osuna took possession of the ranch in 1851 when his father died. A veteran of the Battle of San Pasqual in 1846, Leandro died in 1859; he was thirty-seven years old. The care of Rancho San Diequito fell to Juan Osuna's widow, Juliana Lopez de Osuna.

With the cession of California to the United States following the Mexican-American War, the 1848 Treaty of Guadalupe Hidalgo provided that the land grants would be honored. As required by the Land Act of 1851, a claim for Rancho San Dieguito was filed with the Public Land Commission in 1852, and the grant was patented to Juliana Lopez de Osuna in 1871.

=== Rancho Santa Fe ===
The Osuna heirs in 1906 sold the Rancho San Dieguito land grant to the Santa Fe Land Improvement Company, a subsidiary of the Atchison, Topeka and Santa Fe Railway Company. The railway acquired it for planting groves of blue gum eucalyptus (Eucalyptus globulus) trees to harvest for railroad ties. However, the eucalyptus wood was too soft for railroad spikes, splitting when hammered into. Looking to recoup their losses on the failed timber venture, the Santa Fe Land Improvement Company began the development of a planned community of country estates, renamed Rancho Santa Fe in 1922. It had a thematic unity from Spanish Colonial Revival and Mediterranean Revival architectural styles for original structures and landscape features, that created an ambiance evocative of the Spanish and Mexican Rancho era.

== Historic sites of the Rancho ==
- Juan María Osuna Adobe — the first home of Juan María Osuna, one of the oldest adobes in California.
- Leandro Osuna Adobe — in 1924 A.H. Barlow, a La Jolla businessman, purchased the historic adobe, saving it from destruction. Several years later Lilian Rice completed its rehabilitation. It remains on a knoll overlooking the San Dieguito River valley.

== See also ==
- Ranchos of San Diego County
- List of Ranchos of California
