= Tom Chino =

American businessman

Tom Chino is a farmer based in Rancho Santa Fe, California. He is a member of the Chino family which includes 8 brothers and sisters. Most well known are Koo, Kay, Fred, and Frank who live on the farm and work with Tom Chino. The family is known for revolutionizing the small farm business. Alice Waters of Chez Panisse helped the Chino family to rise to their elevated status in the food world. She began the slow food movement to use local farms and fresh produce to create organic and less commercial restaurants. Other patrons of the Chino farm include Wolfgang Puck. Locally, the most predominate patrons are Chef Martin Woesle from restaurant Mille Fleurs who has been followed by Market chef Carl Shroeder, George's California Modern led by chef Trey Foshee, and Arterra led by chef Jason Maitland.

Tom attended school at University of California, Berkeley, and majored in Biology. This career path was given up in 1990 when his parents became ill and he was forced to take over at the farm. Since then, he has worked on the farm. The farm has gained national acclaim with articles in publications Saveur and Vogue. There is also a piece on the family in the permanent exhibit on internment camps in the Smithsonian in Washington, D.C.
