= Santiago E. Argüello =

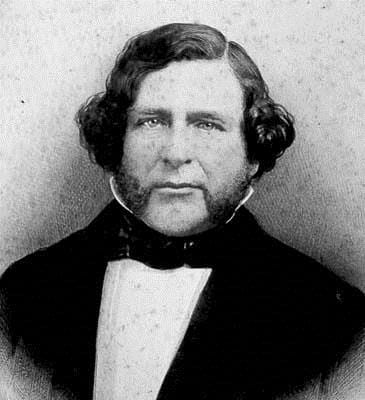
- Born: 1813; Santa Barbara, California
- Died: 1857 (aged 43–44); Rancho Melijo, San Diego, California
- Occupations: Ranchero, politician
- Spouse: Ysabel del Valle

Santiago Emigdio Argüello (1813–1857) was a Californio ranchero, civil servant, and military officer.

== Early life ==
The son of Santiago Argüello, he was born August 18, 1813, in Alta California.

Argüello was collector of revenue at the Mexican port of San Diego, in Alta California Territory.

== Rancho grants ==
He was granted the Rancho Melijo or Rancho de la Punta in 1833, located on the coast and extending from the Tijuana River Valley to San Diego Bay. He took part in the civil conflict against Alvarado in 1836–37 and was a deputy in the assembly in 1845–46. Arguello was in charge of the Rancho Otay and Rancho San Antonio Abad for a time and then majordomo and landowner at San Juan Capistrano in 1841.

He aided the Americans in the Mexican–American War serving as a captain of a company of Californio cavalry, suffering a leg wound in a skirmish with Mexican forces outside San Diego. Afterward he had a claim for $11,548 for damages to his property during the war.

== Personal life ==
Argüello was married to Guadalupe Estudillo, daughter of José María Estudillo and had two sons and number of daughters. One daughter, María Antonia, married to Alfred Henry Wilcox; and another, Refugia, married to William B. Couts.

Santiago E. Argüello died on October 20, 1857, at the Rancho Melijo.
