= Roger A. Sedjo =

American economist

Roger A. Sedjo (born 1939) is an economist and former senior fellow and director of the non-profit Resources for the Future (RFF). Forestry and land use were the major focuses of his career.

Sedjo has been a consultant for the World Bank, the Asian Development Bank, the U.S. Agency for International Development (USAID), the Food and Agricultural Organization of the United Nations (FAO), and the Organisation for Economic Co-operation and Development (OECD).

In 1991, Sedjo wrote a paper reporting that New England has much heavier forest cover than it did in the mid-19th century, which has since been widely cited by critics of environmentalism.

Sedjo and his wife Ruthy (née Glazer) currently live at the Carlsbad By The Sea retirement home in Carlsbad, California with their dog Fiona.

== Publications ==
- Surviving Global Warming: Why Eliminating Greenhouse Gases Isn't Enough (2019) The MIT Press
