= Palm Avenue station =

San Diego Trolley station

Palm Avenue
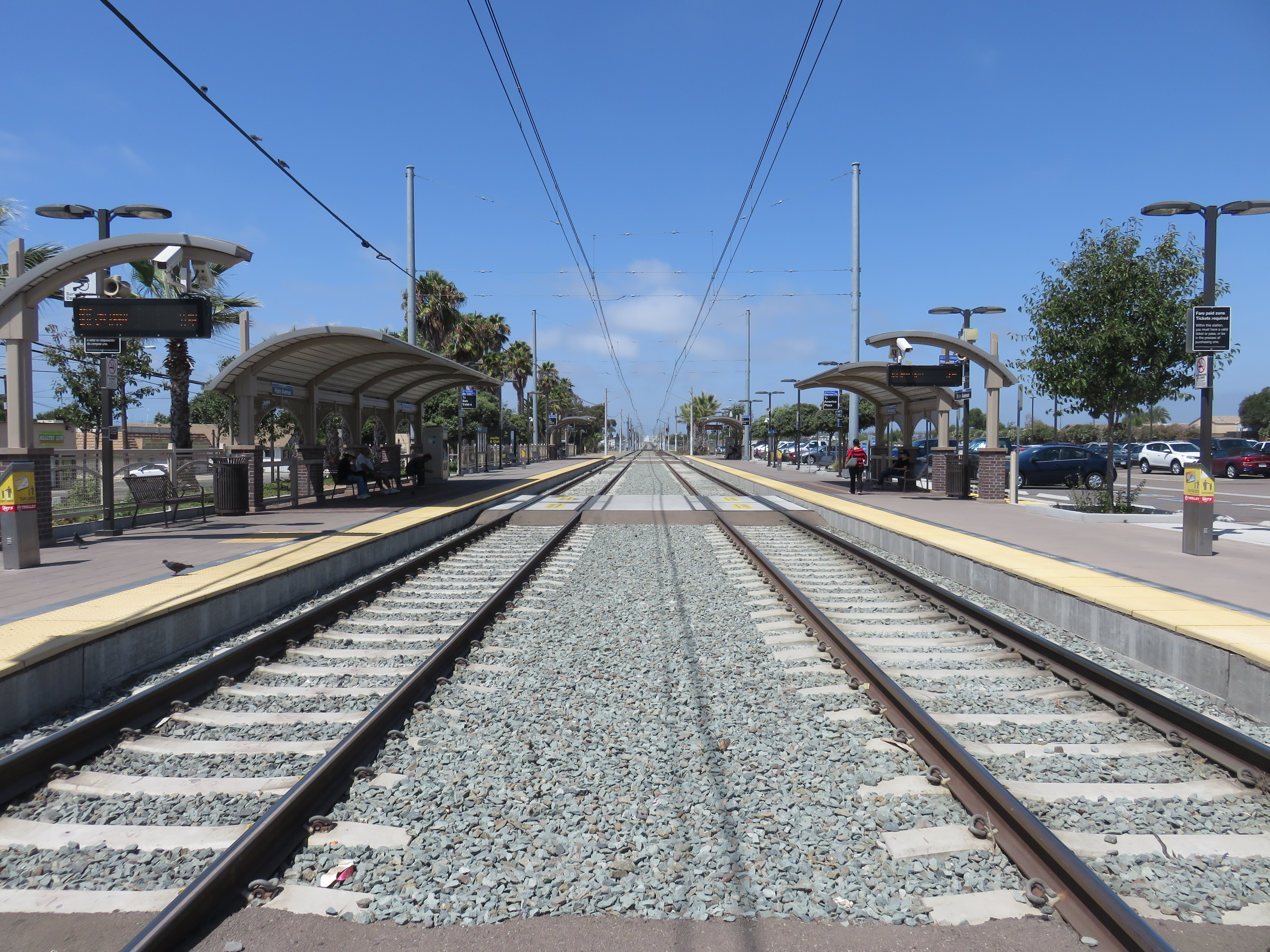
- Palm Avenue station in August 2019

General information
- Location: 2340 Palm Avenue; San Diego, California; United States
- Coordinates: 32°35′02″N 117°05′00″W
- Owner: San Diego Metropolitan Transit System
- Operator: San Diego Trolley
- Line: SD&AE Main Line
- Platforms: 2 side platforms
- Tracks: 2
- Connections: MTS: 932, 933, 934

Construction
- Structure type: At-grade
- Parking: 499 spaces
- Cycle facilities: 8 rack spaces, 2 lockers
- Accessible: Disabled access

Other information
- Station code: 75006, 75007

History
- Opened: July 26, 1981
- Rebuilt: 2015

Services
Preceding station	San Diego Trolley	Following station
Palomar Street toward UTC	Blue Line	Iris Avenue toward San Ysidro
Location

Palm Avenue station is a station on the Blue Line of the San Diego Trolley located near the intersection of Palm Avenue and Hollister Street in the Palm City neighborhood of San Diego. The stop serves a variety of purposes, holding the function of commuter center with a park and ride lot and providing access to the nearby commercial and residential areas.

== History ==
Palm Avenue opened as part of the initial 15.9-mile (25.6 km) "South Line" of the San Diego Trolley system on July 26, 1981, operating from San Ysidro north to downtown San Diego using the main line tracks of the San Diego and Arizona Eastern Railway.

This station was originally scheduled to undergo renovation starting September 2014, as part of the Trolley Renewal Project, though actual renovation construction didn't begin until October 2014; it reopened with a renovated station platform in March 2015. During 2024, a plan to take down the park and ride to build apartment buildings is being decided. This would be one of few stations in the San Diego Trolley that had a park and ride removed and replaced by apartment buildings.

== See also ==
- List of San Diego Trolley stations
