= Rancho Cueros de Venado =

19th-century land grant in Baja California, Mexico

- Land Grant
- Etymology: "Hides of Deer"
- Country: Mexico
- State: Baja California
- Municipality: Tijuana
- Established: 1835
- Founder: Juan María Marrón

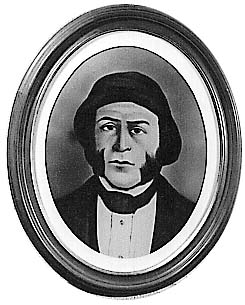
Rancho Cueros de Venado was granted to Juan María Marrón in 1835.

Rancho Cueros de Venado ("Hides of Deer") was an 1835 land grant in the vicinity of the Pueblo of San Diego in Alta California, and whose site is in present-day Tijuana in Baja California, Mexico.

An expediente was submitted on August 29, 1835. The rancho was owned and occupied by Juan María Marrón in 1836.

The rancho was already established in 1836 when it was attacked by the Kumeyaay people at the beginning of their hostilities against the ranchos of the San Diego region. Its defenders managed to kill several of the attackers and repelled the raid. The grant, being wholly in Mexican territory, was never presented before the Land Commission of the State of California.

The rancho was located in the mountains southeast of Rancho Tía Juana and northeast of Rancho El Rosario within the strip of Alta California left to Mexico by the 1848 Treaty of Guadalupe Hidalgo.

Rancho Curero de Venedo is noted as still being in existence in a report of settlements and ranchos in Baja California Norte in 1906, indicating that the grant was confirmed by the Mexican government like the Rancho Tía Juana in the 1880s.

The rancho's region in the southeast of Tijuana Municipality still bears the name "Cueros de Venedo".
