= John G. Cawelti =

American novelist (1929–2022)

John George Cawelti (December 31, 1929 – May 30, 2022) was an American scholar and critic who wrote The Spy Story as well as works about the genres of detective fiction and westerns. He was also interested in science fiction and taught the course on it at the University of Chicago while there. He received the Quantrell Award.

Cawelti was one of the pioneers in establishing an academic respectability to the study of popular culture. His 1971 book The Six Gun Mystique analyzes the messages contained in the western novels which were very popular for many decades with the public. His seminal Adventure, Mystery, and Romance: Formula Stories as Art and Popular Culture dissected the formulas used in these popular genres and argued for their importance alongside "high" literature.

He was born in Evanston, Illinois.

Cawelti died in Louisville, Kentucky on May 30, 2022, at the age of 92. The John G. Cawelti Award is annually presented in his honor by the Popular Culture Association to the author of a noteworthy textbook, primer, or scholarly book used in the classroom on popular culture and American Culture.

== Bibliography ==
Selected Works

- (1965) Apostles of the Self-Made Man. Chicago: University of Chicago Press.
- (1971) The Six-Gun Mystique. Bowling Green, OH: Bowling Green State University Popular Press.
- (1973) Why Pop? San Francisco: Chandler and Sharp.
- (1976) Adventure, Mystery, and Romance: Formula Stories as Art and Popular Culture. Chicago: University of Chicago Press.
- (2004) Mystery, Violence, and Popular Culture. Madison: University of Wisconsin Press.
