= Juan María Osuna =

Early settler of San Diego, California (1785–1851)

- Born: 1785; San Diego, California
- Died: March 5, 1851 (aged 65–66); San Diego, California
- Citizenship: Mexican
- Occupations: Soldier, alcalde, rancher
- Known for: First Alcalde of San Diego
- Spouse: María Juliana Josepha Lopez
- Children: Felipa, Luguarda, Leandro, Ramón
- Parent(s): Juan Hismerio Osuna and María Alvarado

Juan María Osuna (1785 – March 5, 1851) was an early settler of San Diego, California.

== Life ==
Juan María Osuna was born 1785 in California to Juan Hismerio Osuna and Maria Alvarado. He was a soldier and corporal of the San Diego Company and settled in San Diego. Juan María Osuna was District elector in 1830 and took part in the Mexican Revolution of 1831.

After retiring as a corporal, Osuna and his family were the first to build on the plain outside the Presidio of San Diego. He built a three-room adobe with his sons and a dispensary.

In 1833, with five other male citizens, Osuna urged the governor to establish a pueblo government for San Diego, to replace 60-some years of military rule. On January 1, 1835, this came to reality and Osuna was elected the first Alcade of San Diego pueblo. Lt. Santiago Argüello, the last Commandant of San Diego Presidio gave Osuna his staff of office, symbolizing the transfer of government from the military to civilian self-rule. He defeated Pío Pico by 13 votes. Pico later became the last Mexican governor of Alta California. Osuna also served as juez de pas (justice of the peace) 1839–40 and 1846.

Juan María Osuna was granted Rancho San Dieguito, 25 miles (40 km.) north of San Diego along the coast, during 1836–1845. He raised cattle and horses on the ranch. Osuna had a weakness in gambling and had to sell some of his land to pay off his debts. Today Rancho San Dieguito is known as Rancho Santa Fe, an exclusive residential area. Juan María Osuna's adobe, overlooking the San Dieguito River Valley, has been restored and is part of The Rancho Santa Fe Homeowners Association.

== Personal life ==
On February 15, 1806, Juan María Osuna married María Juliana Josepha Lopez, who was born March 16, 1791, to Juan Francisco Lopez, of the Portolà Expedition) and María Feliciana Arballo de Gutierrez. Their daughter Felipa married Juan María Marrón, their daughter Luguarda married José María Alvarado, and their two sons were Leandro and Ramon.

== Later life and death ==
During the Mexican–American War Juan María Osuna remained loyal to Mexico. In 1846, U.S. troops occupied his San Diego home and his youngest son Santiago was killed. His last years were difficult under U.S. rule, as he didn't speak English and was unfamiliar with U.S. law and customs.

Osuna died 1851, and is buried in El Campo Santo Catholic Cemetery in Old Town, San Diego. A modern headstone reads "Juan Maria Osuna Died 1851 First Alcalde Of San Diego". His wife died December 22, 1871, and was buried next to him.

== Sources ==
- "San Dieguito Rancho", Historic Ranchos of San Diego by Cecil C. Moyer, Richard F. Pourade, ed. (1960)
- Biography (San Diego Historical Society) from Smythe's History of San Diego (1907), p. 171.
- "A Political History of a Mexican Pueblo: San Diego from 1825 to 1845 Part I", The Journal of San Diego History 12:3 (Fall 1966) by Lucy Killea
- "Tradition and Today: The Osuna Story" The Journal of San Diego History 14:2 (1968)
- 1850 Census, San Diego, California, p. 278A
- Early California Population Project, www.huntington.org, Mission San Juan Capistrano baptismal record #03846 of daughter shows his parents' names.
