= José Manuel Machado =

Mexican politician (1781–1852)

José Manuel Machado (1781–1852) was a Spanish soldier, ranchero, early citizen and regiador on the ayuntamiento of the Pueblo of San Diego.

== Biography ==
José Manuel Machado was born in 1781, but details of his life before joining the Spanish army are unknown.

The elder Machado came as a corporal of the Leather Jacket Company to garrison the Presido of San Diego in 1782. During his many years of service the younger Machado advanced rapidly in rank, holding many military offices. He commanded the military guards at Mission San Luis Rey and Mission San Diego. He was involved in the founding of the mission stations at Las Flores, Pala and Temecula.

In 1808, Machado was married to María Serafina Valdez, the daughter of Eugenio Valdez, a fellow soldier from the garrison at Los Angeles. In the following years they would have 15 children.

Following Mexican independence from Spain, Machado was a loyal officer of the Mexican army and administered the garrison rancho of the San Diego Presidio, later the Rancho de la Nación. For loyal service, he was granted the Rancho El Rosario in 1827 on lands of Misión El Descanso in Baja California. During the early 1830s he became a citizen of the new Pueblo of San Diego where he built a one-story adobe house for his family below the presidio, on what became 2724 Congress Street. In 1836, he was a Regiador (city councilman) in the ayuntamiento of the San Diego Pueblo.

There is a conflation here of Juan Machado (1756-1810 - married Maria Carmen De la Luz y Valenzuela) and his son, Jose Manuel Machado (1781-1852 - married Maria Serafina Valdez) - The eldest Machado arrived in San Diego about 1781 and then continued to San Gabriel Mission where his son was born. His son followed in his father's footsteps and grew to also become a Spanish Leather Jacket soldier. The younger Machado then went back to San Diego as a young man, where he married Valdez and parented many children, including Juana De Dios Machado - considered the "mother" of San Diego.

José Manuel Machado died October 18, 1852.

== See also ==
Casa de Machado y Silvas
