= Rancho El Rosario =

Mexican land grant issued in 1827

Rancho El Rosario, subsequently renamed Rancho Rosarito, was a land grant made to José Manuel Machado, one of the first soldiers stationed at the Presidio of San Diego. The grant was made in 1827, by Governor José María de Echeandía. It covered 11 leagues or 19,311 hectares in what is now Rosarito Beach Municipality of Baja California, Mexico, including the city of Rosarito Beach and other towns and localities in the municipality.

The property of Rancho El Rosario was bounded on the north by Rancho Tía Juana and in the mountains to the northeast by Rancho Cueros de Venado.

The remaining ranch house, built in 1840, is located near the location of the Mission El Descanso south of Rosarito Beach.
