= Juan María Marrón =

American politician (1808–1853)

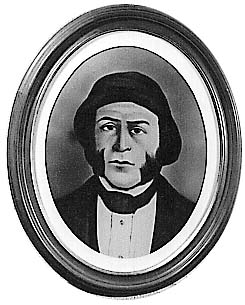
- Rancho Agua Hedionda was granted to Californio Juan María Marrón in 1842.

Alcalde of San Diego
- In office January 1, 1835 – 1836
- Succeeded by: Santiago Argüello

Personal details
- Born: February 8, 1808 San Diego, California
- Died: September 17, 1853 (aged 45) San Diego, California
- Spouse: Felipa Osuna
- Children: 4
- Occupation: Ship's Captain, Alcalde, Landowner
- Known for: Grant of Rancho Agua Hedionda; service as Alcalde of San Diego

Juan María Marrón (February 8, 1808 – September 17, 1853) was a Californio civil servant and ranchero in San Diego, California.

== Life ==
Marrón was a ship's captain before settling San Diego in the early 1820s. In 1834 Marrón, married Felipa Osuna (c. 1818 – December 21, 1871), the daughter of Juan María Osuna. They had three sons and one daughter.

Marrón served as the first alcade of the Pueblo de San Diego during 1 January 1835 – 1836. He also served as Regidor (Alderman) and Juez de Paz (Justice of the Peace). He is known to have owned Rancho Cueros de Venado, located southeast of what is now Tijuana, from sometime before 1836. Like many of the local ranchos near San Diego, that rancho was attacked by the Kumeyaay during the hostilities between 1836 and 1840.

Marrón was granted Rancho Agua Hedionda in 1842, which is in the southern coastal part of present-day Carlsbad. Agua Hedionda means "stinking water", named after decayed organic material in Agua Hedionda Lagoon.

During the Mexican–American War Marrón supported the Americans. This caused him hardship and embarrassment with his friends. Once incident was related by Richard F. Pourade in The Silver Dons:

One morning, along the road from the mission, came Alcalde Juan María Marrón, husband of Felipa Osuna, carrying a white flag. He wanted to visit his wife. Capt. Miguel de Pedrorena took him into custody, but Commodore Robert F. Stockton finally gave Felipa and her husband a pass through the lines, to go to their rancho. With their children they walked all the way to San Luis Rey Mission, where another band of Californios seized them and threatened to shoot Marrón for having collaborated with the Americans. They released him but stripped his Agua Hedionda Rancho of horses and cattle.

Later Rancho Agua Hedionda was acquired and held by the Kelly family for many years. The adobe home of Marrón still stands, although modernized in the 1960s.

Marrón died in 1853 and is buried in El Campo Santo Catholic Cemetery in Old Town San Diego.

== Sources ==
- "Agua Hedionda Rancho", Historic Ranchos of San Diego by Cecil C. Moyer, Richard F. Pourade, ed. (1960)
- "Rancho Agua Hedionda", (Carlsbad, California)
- 1850 Census, San Diego, California, p. 278B
