= Rancho Santa Fe, California =

Census-designated place in California, United States

Rancho Santa Fe
- Unincorporated community Census-designated place
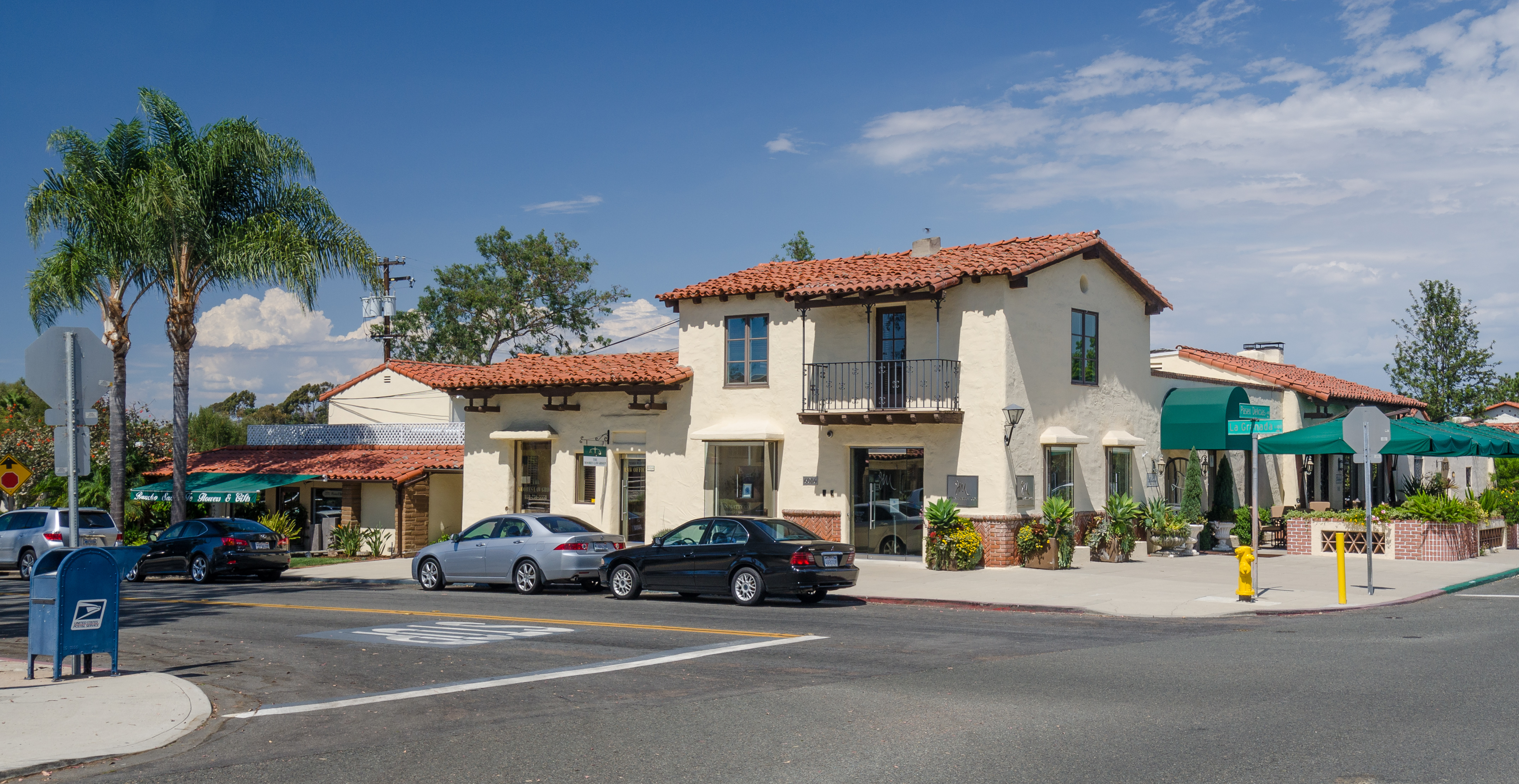
- Nickname: The Ranch
- Location in San Diego County, California

- Location in the United States Rancho Santa Fe (southern California) Rancho Santa Fe (California) Rancho Santa Fe (the United States)
- Coordinates: 33°1′26″N 117°12′0″W
- Country: United States
- State: California
- County: San Diego

Area
  - Total: 6.785 sq mi (17.573 km^{2})
  - Land: 6.712 sq mi (17.385 km^{2})
  - Water: 0.073 sq mi (0.189 km^{2}) 1.07%
- Elevation: 246 ft (75 m)

Population (April 1, 2020)
  - Total: 3,156
  - Density: 470.2/sq mi (181.5/km^{2})
- Time zone: UTC−8 (Pacific Time Zone)
  - Summer (DST): UTC−7 (PDT)
- ZIP codes: 92067, 92091
- Area code: 858
- FIPS code: 06-59584
- GNIS feature IDs: 247968, 2409138

California Historical Landmark
- Reference no.: 982

Rancho Santa Fe is a census-designated place (CDP) in San Diego County, California, United States, within the San Diego metropolitan area. The population was 3,156 at the 2020 census. The CDP is primarily residential with a few shopping blocks, a middle and elementary school, and several restaurants.

Rancho Santa Fe borders the Fairbanks Ranch gated community to the southeast, Solana Beach to the southwest, and Encinitas to the west.

== History ==
=== "Rancho San Dieguito" land grant ===
In 1841, Rancho San Dieguito, as it was originally named, was a Mexican land grant of 8,824 acres (35.71 km^{2}) from Governor Pío Pico of Alta California to Juan Maria Osuna, the first alcalde (mayor) of the Pueblo of San Diego.

=== Railway usage for lumber ===
In 1906, the Santa Fe Railway, a subsidiary of the Atchison, Topeka & Santa Fe Railway under Walter E. Hodges, purchased the entire land grant to plant 3.5 million blue gum eucalyptus (Eucalyptus globulus) trees for use as railroad ties, but the wood proved too soft to hold railroad spikes.

=== Pivot to real estate, "Rancho San Dieguito" renamed as Rancho Santa Fe" ===
Just weeks before they were to put the land grant on the market, Ed Fletcher (the prominent San Diego land and water developer) convinced the railroad that they could recoup their losses by developing the lands into an agricultural (horticultural and floricultural) district and sell ranch plots to the public.

=== Development of water resources for the planned community ===
The railroad then formed the Santa Fe Land Improvement Company to develop a planned community of country estates. In 1918, the Santa Fe Land & Improvement Co completed the Lake Hodges Dam and San Dieguito Dam thus complementing the Lower Otay Dam / Savage Dam and providing sufficient water for the agricultural vision of the Santa Fe Irrigation District (providing water for Rancho Santa Fe but also for Fletcher's downstream developments of the Del Mar and Solana Beach communities). At the time of the filing of the map in 1921, the 6,200 acres (25 km^{2}) developed from the original Rancho San Dieguito land grant were renamed "Rancho Santa Fe".

=== Master planning and construction ===
In 1921, architect Lilian Rice, working under Requa and Jackson, was chosen to develop the community's master plan. Rice worked through to 1927, designing, supervising, and constructing the village center, as well as several homes. The basics of the original Lilian Rice land plan are in effect to this day, and the resulting low density high green space community is unique in Southern California.

In 1923, the Santa Fe Land Company constructed a guest house called "La Morada" to house potential land purchasers. It was renamed in 1941, as "The Inn", when it was purchased by a private owner.

From 1937 to 1947, Bing Crosby hosted a golf tournament known as the "Bing Crosby Clambake" at the Rancho Santa Fe Country Club. Crosby's golf tournaments, which included Hollywood celebrities matched against professionals, drew great crowds to the area. After 1947, the tournament was moved to the Monterey Peninsula, not far from San Francisco.

In 1989, "The Covenant" of Rancho Santa Fe was registered as California Historical Landmark #982 for its status as a historic planned community.

In 1996, the religious cult Heaven's Gate began renting a mansion in Rancho Santa Fe which, in March 1997, became the site of the group's mass suicide.

In 2007, the Witch Fire caused significant damage to Rancho Santa Fe, damaging or destroying over 80 homes.

== In Autobiography ==
The experience of growing up in Rancho Santa Fe during the late 1940s and '50s is nostalgically evoked in Time Between, a 2020 memoir by Rock & Roll Hall of Famer Chris Hillman, of the Byrds. His father, David Hillman, was the editor/publisher of the weekly Rancho Santa Fe Times, and for many years the newspaper was an entirely family-run operation.

== Geography ==
Rancho Santa Fe is located at 33°1′26″N 117°12′0″W (33.023943, -117.200110).

According to the United States Census Bureau, the CDP has a total area of 6.8 square miles (18 km^{2}). 6.7 square miles (17 km^{2}) of it is land and 0.1 square miles (0.26 km^{2}) of it (1.07%) is water.

=== Climate ===
According to the Köppen climate classification system, Rancho Santa Fe has a warm-summer Mediterranean climate, abbreviated "Csa" on climate maps.

The climate of Rancho Santa Fe is, for the most part, typical of the San Diego metropolitan area though its higher elevation and inland location lends itself to larger temperature variations.

== Demographics ==
Historical population
Census	Pop.	Note	%±
2000	3,252		—
2010	3,117		−4.2%
2020	3,156		1.3%
U.S. Decennial Census; 1860–1870 1880-1890; 1900 1910 1920; 1930 1940 1950; 1960 1970 1980; 1990 2000 2010; 2020

Rancho Santa Fe first appeared as a census-designated place in the 2000 U.S. census.

=== Racial and ethnic composition ===
Rancho Santa Fe CDP, California – Racial and ethnic composition Note: the US Census treats Hispanic/Latino as an ethnic category. This table excludes Latinos from the racial categories and assigns them to a separate category. Hispanics/Latinos may be of any race.
Race / Ethnicity (NH = Non-Hispanic)	Pop 2000	Pop 2010	Pop 2020	% 2000	% 2010	% 2020
White alone (NH)	2,933	2,788	2,544	90.19%	89.44%	80.61%
Black or African American alone (NH)	11	10	28	0.34%	0.32%	0.89%
Native American or Alaska Native alone (NH)	5	0	5	0.15%	0.00%	0.16%
Asian alone (NH)	90	87	157	2.77%	2.79%	4.97%
Native Hawaiian or Pacific Islander alone (NH)	1	4	6	0.03%	0.13%	0.19%
Other race alone (NH)	6	8	24	0.18%	0.26%	0.76%
Mixed race or Multiracial (NH)	33	44	131	1.01%	1.41%	4.15%
Hispanic or Latino (any race)	173	176	261	5.32%	5.65%	8.27%
Total	3,252	3,117	3,156	100.00%	100.00%	100.00%

=== 2020 census ===
As of the 2020 census, Rancho Santa Fe had a population of 3,156 and a population density of 470.2 inhabitants per square mile (181.5/km^{2}). The racial makeup of Rancho Santa Fe was 83.4% White, 0.9% African American, 0.2% Native American, 5.0% Asian, 0.2% Pacific Islander, 2.1% from other races, and 8.3% from two or more races. Hispanic or Latino of any race were 8.3% of the population.

The whole population lived in households. There were 1,194 households, out of which 27.3% included children under the age of 18, 66.4% were married-couple households, 2.8% were cohabiting couple households, 19.8% had a female householder with no partner present, and 11.1% had a male householder with no partner present. 18.4% of households were one person, and 12.2% were one person aged 65 or older. The average household size was 2.64. There were 933 families (78.1% of all households).

The age distribution was 20.0% under the age of 18, 7.6% aged 18 to 24, 10.6% aged 25 to 44, 32.3% aged 45 to 64, and 29.6% who were 65 years of age or older. The median age was 52.8 years. For every 100 females, there were 94.0 males, and for every 100 females age 18 and over there were 95.4 males age 18 and over.

There were 1,390 housing units at an average density of 207.1 units per square mile (80.0 units/km^{2}), of which 1,194 (85.9%) were occupied. 14.1% of housing units were vacant. Of the occupied units, 88.4% were owner-occupied, and 11.6% were occupied by renters. The homeowner vacancy rate was 2.0%, and the rental vacancy rate was 12.0%.

100.0% of residents lived in urban areas, while 0.0% lived in rural areas.

=== Income and poverty ===
In 2023, the US Census Bureau estimated that the median household income was $236,429, and the per capita income was $117,279. About 0.0% of families and 2.4% of the population were below the poverty line.

=== 2010 census ===
At the 2010 census Rancho Santa Fe had a population of 3,117. The population density was 459.2 inhabitants per square mile (177.3/km^{2}). The racial makeup of Rancho Santa Fe was 2,910 (93.4%) White, 10 (0.3%) African American, 1 (0.0%) Native American, 87 (2.8%) Asian, 4 (0.1%) Pacific Islander, 45 (1.4%) from other races, and 60 (1.9%) from two or more races. Hispanic or Latino of any race were 176 people (5.6%).

The whole population lived in households, no one lived in non-institutionalized group quarters and no one was institutionalized.

There were 1,195 households, 364 (30.5%) had children under the age of 18 living in them, 848 (71.0%) were opposite-sex married couples living together, 62 (5.2%) had a female householder with no husband present, 33 (2.8%) had a male householder with no wife present. There were 23 (1.9%) unmarried opposite-sex partnerships, and 9 (0.8%) same-sex married couples or partnerships. 213 households (17.8%) were one person and 124 (10.4%) had someone living alone who was 65 or older. The average household size was 2.61. There were 943 families (78.9% of households); the average family size was 2.93.

The age distribution was 724 people (23.2%) under the age of 18, 142 people (4.6%) aged 18 to 24, 332 people (10.7%) aged 25 to 44, 1,178 people (37.8%) aged 45 to 64, and 741 people (23.8%) who were 65 or older. The median age was 51.3 years. For every 100 females, there were 96.4 males. For every 100 females age 18 and over, there were 93.5 males.

There were 1,391 housing units at an average density of 204.9 per square mile, of the occupied units 1,010 (84.5%) were owner-occupied and 185 (15.5%) were rented. The homeowner vacancy rate was 2.4%; the rental vacancy rate was 12.3%. 2,674 people (85.8% of the population) lived in owner-occupied housing units and 443 people (14.2%) lived in rental housing units.

The median household income was $188,859. Males had a median income of over $153,512 versus $71,667 for females. The per capita income for the CDP was $125,367. 3.2% of the population and 2.1% of families were below the poverty line. 2.3% under the age of 18 and 9.6% of those 65 and older were living below the poverty line.

== Politics ==
Rancho Santa Fe is a stronghold of the Republican Party in San Diego County. In the 2008 presidential election, its voters chose John McCain over Barack Obama with 66.61%, significantly higher than the county-wide average of 43.79%. The community approved of California Proposition 8 with 57.57%, while Proposition 4 passed with 53.06% of the vote.

In the California State Legislature, Rancho Santa Fe is in the 38th senatorial district, represented by Democrat Catherine Blakespear, and in the 76th Assembly district, represented by Democrat Darshana Patel.

In the United States House of Representatives, Rancho Santa Fe is located in California's 50th congressional district, which has a Cook PVI of D+14 and is represented by Democrat Scott Peters.

== Education ==
Rancho Santa Fe is serviced by the following school districts:

- Rancho Santa Fe Elementary School District
- Solana Beach School District (Pre-K through Grade 6)
- San Dieguito Union High School District (Grade 7 through Grade 12)

The public library in Rancho Santa Fe is a branch of the San Diego County Library system, and is open to all California residents. The Rancho Santa Fe Library Guild owns the building and land that house the Rancho Santa Fe Library, as well as providing the staff for the children's room.

== Notable residents ==
- Kirsten Bloom Allen, ballet dancer and actress
- Warren Barton, former English football player
- Bud Black, manager of Colorado Rockies, major league pitcher from 1981 to 1995, manager of San Diego Padres 2007–2015
- Drew Brees, NFL quarterback, lived in Rancho Santa Fe between 2003 and 2012
- Tom Chino, farmer
- John H. Cox, businessman and politician
- Jenny Craig, founder of Jenny Craig Inc.
- Steve Finley, former major league baseball player
- Taylor Fritz, professional tennis player
- Bill Gates, entrepreneur, software executive, philanthropist and former chairman of Microsoft
- Jonathan Goldsmith, actor
- Gordon Hayward, professional basketball player, lived in Rancho Santa Fe between 2015 and 2020
- Charley Hoffman, professional golfer, San Diego native
- Trevor Hoffman, former professional baseball player
- Robert Herring owner of Herring Networks
- Kyle Hurt, professional baseball player
- Travis Lee, former professional baseball player
- Quentin Jammer, former professional football player
- Jelena Janković, Serbian professional tennis player
- Kawhi Leonard, professional basketball player
- Mike Love, Beach Boys singer and songwriter
- Jamie Lovemark, professional golfer
- Phil Mickelson, professional golfer
- John Moores, philanthropist, former owner of San Diego Padres, former regent of University of California
- Bill Murray, actor
- Reza Pahlavi, Crown Prince of Iran
- Philip Rivers, professional football player
- Ace Frehley, former Kiss guitarist
- Andrew Viterbi, Communication engineer, Qualcomm founder
- CoCo Vandeweghe, women's tennis player
- Troy Polamalu, former professional football player
- Arnold Schwarzenegger, former professional body builder, actor and governor of California (vacation home)
- Richard Simmons, actor and weight loss guru
- Tiger Woods, professional golfer (vacation home)

== Notable former residents ==
- Jackson D. Arnold, retired Admiral, USN
- Shannon Storms Beador, cast member on The Real Housewives of Orange County
- Glen Bell, founder of Taco Bell
- Clair Burgener, former congressman
- Bing Crosby, actor, singer
- Sidney Frank, liquor promotions billionaire
- Ace Frehley, musician and co-founder of Kiss
- Chris Hillman, of The Hillmen, The Byrds, The Flying Burrito Brothers, Manassas, The Desert Rose Band, and many other projects and groups.
- Howard Hughes, business magnate, investor, aviator, aerospace engineer, film maker and philanthropist
- Joan Kroc, philanthropist and widow of McDonald's founder Ray Kroc
- George J. Lewis, actor, best known for playing Don Alejandro de la Vega in the 1950s television series Zorro
- Victor Mature, stage, film and television actor
- Patti Page, stage, film, television, recording artist
- Lilian Jennette Rice, early 20th-century architect, designed The Inn and civic center of Rancho Santa Fe, plus homes that hold a historic designation
- Pete Rozelle, former commissioner of the NFL
- Milburn Stone, actor, "Doc Adams" on the TV series Gunsmoke
- John Paxton, actor
- Bill Paxton, actor
- Preston M. Fleet, WD-40, Reuben H Fleet Science Center and Planetarium, IMAX/Omni Max Hearst Castle
