= Patricia Wentworth =

British crime fiction writer (1877–1961)

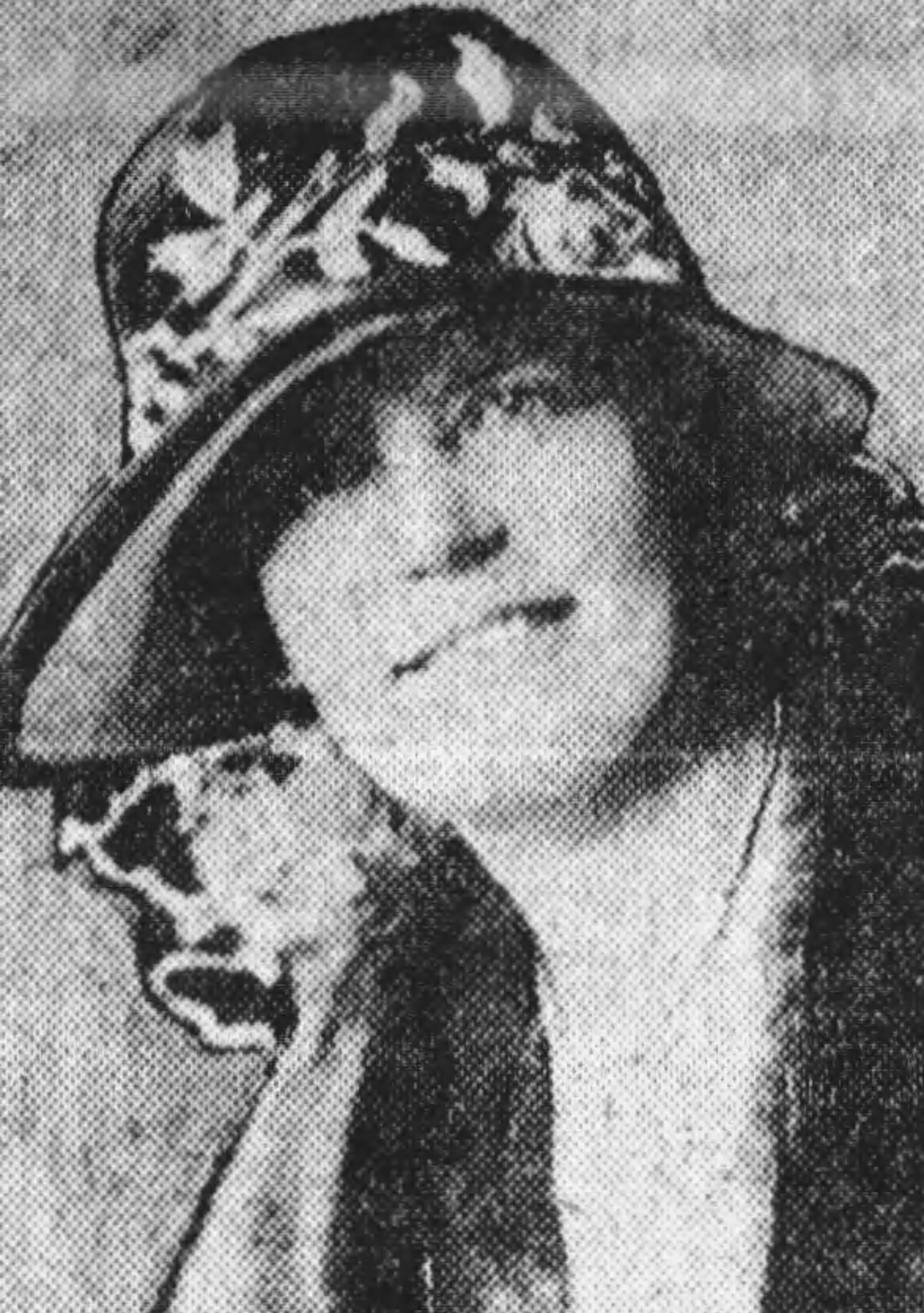
- Wentworth, c. 1928
- Born: Dora Amy Elles; 10 November 1877; Mussoorie, British India
- Died: 28 January 1961 (aged 83); Camberley, Surrey
- Occupation: Novelist
- Spouse(s): George F. Dillon; George Oliver Turnbull (1920)
- Children: 2
- Writing career
- Pen name: Patricia Wentworth
- Genres: Crime; Detective
- Notable awards: Melrose; 1910 A Marriage Under The Terror

Dora Amy Turnbull (formerly Dillon, née Elles; 15 October 1877 – 28 January 1961), known by the pen name Patricia Wentworth, was a British crime fiction writer.

== Early life and education ==
She was born in Mussoorie, then in British India, and was educated first privately, then at Blackheath High School for Girls in London. Her father was General Edmond Elles, and her mother was Clare, Lady Elles, nee Rothney.

== Personal life ==
She and her first husband, Lt. Col. George Frederick Horace Dillon, had one daughter. She also became stepmother to Dillon's three sons, two of whom died during the First World War. After Dillon's death, in 1906, she settled in Camberley, Surrey. In 1920, she married Lt. Col. George Oliver Turnbull. One of her stepsons who died in the war had Wentworth as a middle name, after Wentworth Dillon, 4th Earl of Roscommon, and she adopted Wentworth as her pen name.

Dora Amy Turnbull died on 28 January 1961, aged 83. Her estate was valued at £24 561.

== Career ==
Wentworth wrote a series of 32 crime novels in the classic whodunit style, featuring Miss Maud Silver, a retired governess and teacher who becomes a professional private detective, in London, England. Miss Silver works closely with Scotland Yard, especially Inspector Frank Abbott, and is fond of quoting the poet Tennyson. Miss Silver is sometimes compared to Jane Marple, the elderly detective created by Agatha Christie.

"Miss Silver is well known in the better circles of society, and she finds entree to the troubled households of the upper classes with little difficulty. In most of Miss Silver's cases there is a young couple whose romance seems ill fated because of the murder to be solved, but in Miss Silver's competent hands the case is solved, the young couple are exonerated, and all is right in this very traditional world."

Wentworth also wrote 34 books outside that series. She won the Melrose prize in 1910 for her first novel A Marriage Under The Terror, set in the French Revolution.

== Works ==
=== Miss Silver series ===
- Grey Mask, 1928
- The Case Is Closed, 1937
- Lonesome Road, 1939
- Danger Point (USA: In the Balance), 1941
- The Chinese Shawl, 1943
- Miss Silver Intervenes (USA: Miss Silver Deals with Death), 1943
- The Clock Strikes Twelve, 1944
- The Key, 1944
- The Traveller Returns (USA: She Came Back), 1945
- Pilgrim's Rest (or: Dark Threat), 1946
- Latter End, 1947
- Spotlight (USA: Wicked Uncle), 1947
- The Case of William Smith, 1948
- Eternity Ring, 1948
- The Catherine Wheel, 1949
- Miss Silver Comes to Stay, 1949
- The Brading Collection (or: Mr Brading's Collection), 1950
- The Ivory Dagger, 1951
- Through the Wall, 1950
- Anna, Where Are You? (or: Death At Deep End), 1951
- The Watersplash, 1951
- Ladies' Bane, 1952
- Out of the Past, 1953
- The Silent Pool, 1954
- Vanishing Point, 1953
- The Benevent Treasure, 1953
- The Gazebo (or: The Summerhouse), 1955
- The Listening Eye, 1955
- Poison in the Pen, 1955
- The Fingerprint, 1956
- The Alington Inheritance, 1958
- The Girl in the Cellar, 1961

=== Frank Garrett series ===
- Dead or Alive, 1936
- Rolling Stone, 1940

=== Ernest Lamb series ===
- The Blind Side, 1939
- Who Pays the Piper? (USA: Account Rendered), 1940
- Pursuit of a Parcel, 1942

=== Benbow Smith ===
- Fool Errant, 1929
- Danger Calling, 1931
- Walk with Care, 1933
- Down Under, 1937

=== Standalone ===
- A Marriage under the Terror, 1910
- A Child's Rhyme Book, 1910
- A Little More Than Kin (or: More Than Kin), 1911
- The Devil's Wind, 1912
- The Fire Within, 1913
- Simon Heriot, 1914
- Queen Anne Is Dead, 1915
- Earl or Chieftain?, 1919
- The Astonishing Adventure of Jane Smith, 1923. Serialised, Baltimore Evening Sun, 1925
- The Red Lacquer Case, 1924. Serialised, Leicester Mail, 1926
- The Annam Jewel, 1924
- The Black Cabinet, 1925
- The Dower House Mystery, 1925
- The Amazing Chance, 1926. Serialised, Dundee Evening Telegraph, 1927
- Hue and Cry, 1927
- Anne Belinda, 1927
- Will-o'-the-Wisp, 1928
- Beggar's Choice, 1930
- The Coldstone, 1930
- Kingdom Lost, 1931
- Nothing Venture, 1932. Serialised, Dundee Courier, 1932
- What Became of Anne, 1926. Serialised, Dundee Courier, 1932
- Red Danger (USA: Red Shadow), 1932
- Seven Green Stones (USA: Outrageous Fortune), 1933
- Devil-in-the-Dark (USA: Touch And Go), 1934
- Fear by Night, 1934
- Red Stefan, 1935
- Blindfold, 1935
- Hole and Corner, 1936
- Mr Zero, 1938
- Afraid to Love, 1938. Serialised, Dundee Courier, 1932
- Run!, 1938
- Unlawful Occasions (USA: Weekend with Death), 1941
- Beneath the Hunter's Moon, Poems, 1945
- Silence in Court, 1947
- The Pool of Dreams: Poems, 1953
