= Miss Silver =

Fictional female detective created by Patricia Wentworth

Miss Silver is a fictional detective featured in 32 novels by British novelist Patricia Wentworth.

== Character ==
Miss Maud Silver is a retired governess-turned-private detective. Like Miss Marple, Miss Silver's age and demeanor make her appear harmless. Some admire the character, believing that "while Miss Marple may receive ten times the attention as Miss Silver, […] the woefully neglected Miss Silver is the real deal – a professional investigator and stand-up woman, a true forerunner of all future female private eyes." Others disagree, claiming that the character "has none of the credibility of […] Miss Marple […]. Her spinsterish appearance is inconsistent with her sensational behavior and also with the far-fetched plots of the novels she features in."

Wentworth wrote a series of 32 crime novels in the classic whodunit style, featuring Miss Maud Silver, a retired governess and teacher who becomes a professional private detective, in London, England. Miss Silver works closely with Scotland Yard, especially Inspector Frank Abbott, is fond of quoting the poet Tennyson and has similarities to Miss Marple, the elderly detective created by Agatha Christie.

"Miss Silver is well known in the better circles of society, and she finds entree to the troubled households of the upper classes with little difficulty. In most of Miss Silver's cases there is a young couple whose romance seems ill fated because of the murder to be solved, but in Miss Silver's competent hands the case is solved, the young couple are exonerated, and all is right in this very traditional world."

Others have argued that Miss Silver's seemingly "passive" knitting in fact gives her "narrative presence" and "a legitimate voice."

== Novels ==
- Grey Mask, 1928
- The Case is Closed, 1937
- Lonesome Road, 1939
- Danger Point (U.S. title: In the Balance), 1941
- The Chinese Shawl, 1943
- Miss Silver Intervenes (U.S. title: Miss Silver Deals with Death), 1943
- The Clock Strikes Twelve, 1944
- The Key, 1944
- The Traveller Returns (U.S. title: She Came Back), 1945
- Pilgrim's Rest (also published as Dark Threat), 1946
- Latter End, 1947
- Spotlight (U.S. title: Wicked Uncle), 1947
- Eternity Ring, 1948
- The Case of William Smith, 1948
- Miss Silver Comes to Stay, 1949
- The Catherine Wheel, 1949
- Through the Wall, 1950
- The Brading Collection (also published as Mr. Brading's Collection), 1950
- The Ivory Dagger, 1951
- Anna, Where Are You? (also published as Death at Deep End), 1951
- The Watersplash, 1951
- Ladies' Bane, 1952
- Out of the Past, 1953
- Vanishing Point, 1953
- The Silent Pool, 1954
- The Benevent Treasure, 1953
- The Listening Eye, 1955
- Poison in the Pen, 1955
- The Gazebo (also published as The Summerhouse), 1956
- The Fingerprint, 1956
- The Alington Inheritance, 1958
- The Girl in the Cellar, 1961
