= Historical Marker Database =

- Website type: Database
- Available in: en-US
- Founded: 2006; 20 years ago
- Founder: J. J. Prats
- Website: www.hmdb.org
- Commercial: No
- Registration: Optional (Note: Registration is required for certain tasks, such as adding and editing markers)
- Current status: Active

The Historical Marker Database (HMdb.org) is an online database that documents locations of numerous historical markers and commemorative plaques in the United States as well as other countries.

== Content and format ==
HMdb displays historical event locations using Google Maps. The HMdb served as the basis for the database for the online augmented reality game Ingress, which was then later repurposed for Pokémon Go.

The HMdb has been described as "crowdsourced", and according to the site's self-description, "Anyone can add new markers to the database and update existing marker pages with new photographs, links, information and commentary." Dozens of Editors review entries from hundreds of Correspondents before they are accepted into the database.

== History ==
The HMdb was launched in 2006 by computer programmer J. J. Prats, with 179 markers that Prats had personally documented. By 2015 the site listed more than 74,000 markers. In addition to listing markers in the United States, the site also lists some markers from more than 40 other countries. By the start of 2018, the site documented more than 100,000 markers. By the start of 2025, more than 225,000 markers had been documented. The 250,000th marker was submitted on December 20th, 2025.

== Reception ==
Artist Paul Druecke described the HMdb as "a different sort of catalogue", one that "allows geeks like me to explore historical plaques throughout the United States." Druecke did a series of charcoal drawings depicting official state-sponsored plaques.

In 2011, Silvio Lacetti argued that the HMdb "offers a wonderful opportunity" for history teachers to instill interest in students by being "a Columbus leading his or her young crew on journeys of local historical discovery", enabling them "to search, discover and learn" through historical markers.
