= Lutheran Services in America =

United States nonprofit network

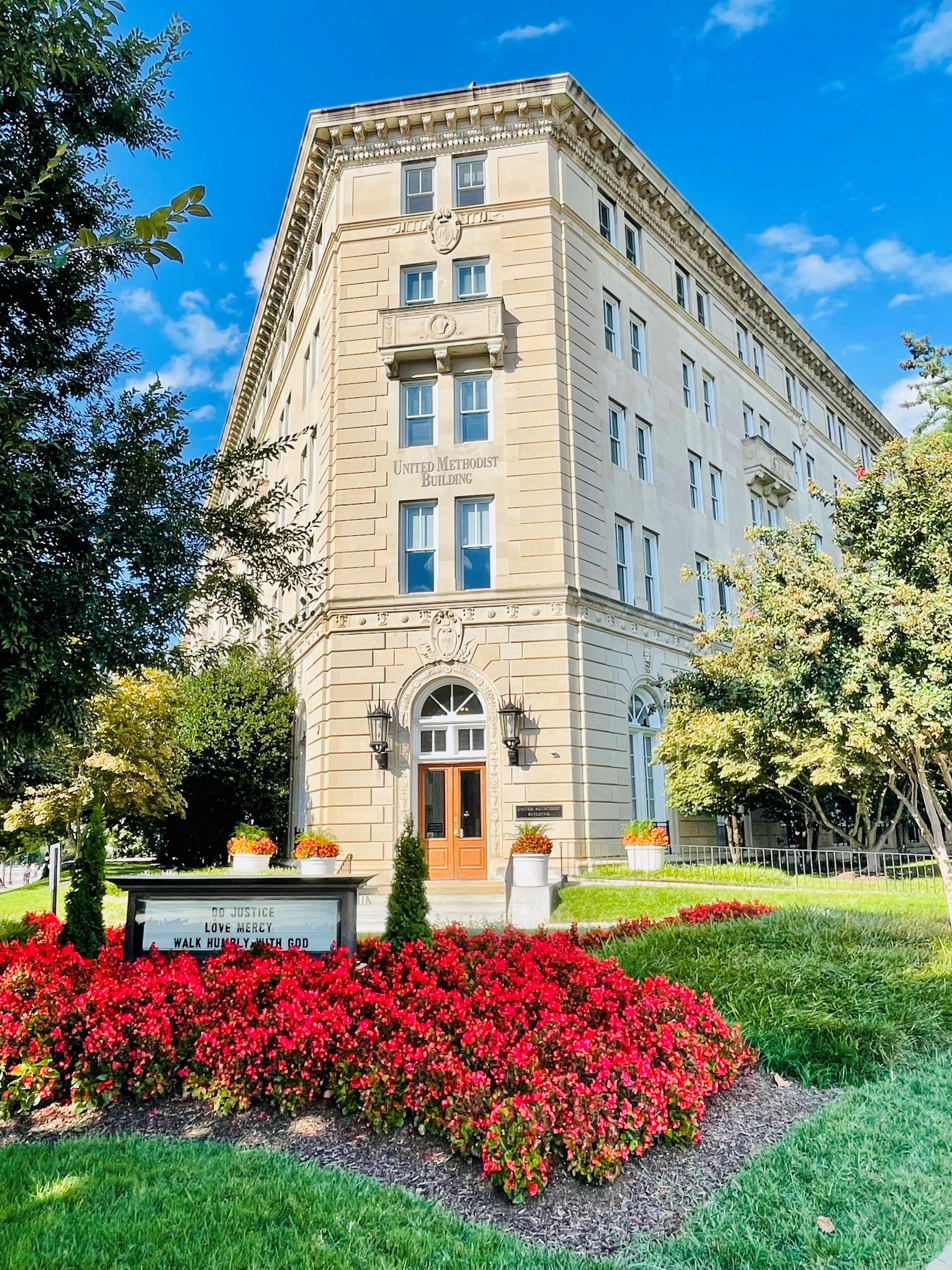
- The offices of Lutheran Services in America at the United Methodist Building in Washington, D.C.
- Abbreviation: LSA
- Formation: 1997; 29 years ago
- Headquarters: Washington, DC
- Region served: United States, Caribbean
- Fields: Healthcare & Human services
- Members: 300 organizations
- President & CEO: Alesia Frerichs
- Affiliations: ELCA; LCMS
- Website: lutheranservices.org

Lutheran Services in America is the national office of a network of 300 Lutheran health and human services organizations across the United States. Headquartered in Washington, DC, Lutheran Services in America amplifies the voice of its $23 billion network to aid community leaders and advance policies and practices that improve the lives of people and communities. It is recognized by the Chronicle of Philanthropy and Forbes as one of the nation’s top nonprofit organizations.

Lutheran Services in America leads collaborations with its member organizations and partners in philanthropy, academia, healthcare, and others to address the most critical challenges in communities and empower people to lead their best lives. It attempts to leverage the shared values, trust, and heritage of Lutheran social ministry to drive systemic change for children, older adults, families, people with disabilities, veterans, refugees, and others experiencing need in the United States.

Together with its member organizations and partners, Lutheran Services in America serves 6 million people in 1,400 communities across the United States each year.

== History ==
Lutheran Services in America was founded in 1997 by the Evangelical Lutheran Church in America (ELCA) and Lutheran Church–Missouri Synod (LCMS). While it leads a network of organizations rooted in five centuries of Lutheran theology, many of which were founded more than 150 years ago, the Lutheran Services in America network offers services to people of all backgrounds.

== Programs ==
Through partnerships and collaboration, Lutheran Services in America leads programs that address the policy and practice changes that

- advance equitable outcomes for children, youth, and families impacted by the child welfare system by expanding programs that reach families in crisis and prevent children from being removed from their homes;
- address gaps in care for older adults by leading collaborative projects to test and evaluate models of service that improve the quality and access to care so older adults can remain in their homes and communities;
- champion services and supports that empower individuals with intellectual and developmental disabilities to live and work in the community of their choice independently; and
- support nonprofit leaders in honing their leadership skills, developing strategies to adapt to the changing needs of their communities, and shaping new paths for low-income people and families.
