= Rancho Tía Juana =

Mexican land grant in California

Coordinates: 32°02′31″N 117°01′39″W

- Land grant of Mexico
- 1829
  - Type: Mexican land grant
- History
  - Established: 1829
  - Disestablished: 1829
- Today part of: Mexico

Rancho Tía Juana, or Ti Juan was a land grant made to Santiago Arguello on March 4, 1829, by Governor José María de Echeandía. It covered 26,019.53 acres in what is now Tijuana in Tijuana Municipality in Baja California, Mexico, and parts of San Ysidro and the Tijuana River Valley, San Diego, in South San Diego in San Diego County, California.

== Background ==
The property of Rancho Tía Juana was bounded on the south by the 11 league Rancho El Rosario, granted by José María de Echeandía in 1827 to Don José Manuel Machado, one of the first soldiers stationed at the Presidio of San Diego.

The original ranch house was located just south of the Mexican border near where current border crossing is today.

The name Tijuan derived from the Kumeyaay Tehuan, a word ascribed various meanings.
