= Sandra Adams =

Sandra Adams could refer to:

- Sandra E. Adams (born 1956), U.S. Navy admiral
- Sandy Adams (born 1956), American politician
