= U.S. Open Sandcastle competition =

Sandcastle competition

The U.S. Open Sandcastle Competition was the largest sandcastle competition in the United States and among the top 10 best sandcastle competitions, according to the Travel Channel. The U.S. Open Sandcastle Competition was an annual, free summer weekend event held in Imperial Beach, California and was open to the public.

The event began on Friday with a community breakfast and dance to kick off the events and was followed by a two-day public event on Saturday and Sunday that consisted of kids, amateur and professional sandcastle building contests. The builders vied for cash prizes. The event also included a street fair, which featured local and regional vendors, as well as entertainment.

The U.S. Open Sandcastle competition had its last year at Imperial Beach in 2011, due to lack of resources and volunteers. It was replaced in 2013 by Imperial Beach's Sun & Sea Festival, which included a sandcastle competition for kids.

== History ==
The competition originated in 1981 when a group of Imperial Beach residents formed the first Sandcastle Days Committee. The U.S. Open Sandcastle Competition Committee was a nonprofit group and part of the proceeds from the event went to benefit the Boys & Girls Clubs of America. Over the years, the event grew to attract more than 325,000 spectators.

== Events ==
The Kids-N-Kastles competition was held on Saturday and was open to children 12 years old and younger. The competition had three categories: castles, best sculpture and creatures of the sea. Teams were allowed to sculpt from 2-3:30 p.m. and then winners and raffle prize winners were announced from 4-5 p.m. on the main stage.

On Sunday, amateur and professional teams competed for over $21,000 in cash prizes. Professional teams competed in the Masters category, which was divided between three-person and 10-person teams. Within the 10-person category, $5,000 was awarded to the first place Master's Champion. Second place won $3,000 and third place $2,000. Within the three-person category, first place won $2,500 and second place $1,500. Amateur teams competed in an "open" competition divided into 5 categories: Castles of Your Mind, Best Sculpture, Best Replica, Creatures of the Sea and Executive Sand Box, which was a business sponsored team. First place won $1,000, second place $500, third place $200 and fourth place $100. All teams sculpted from 9 a.m. to 2 p.m. Due to tides, the sculptures could only be viewed until 4 p.m.

The street fair was held on both Saturday and Sunday and was located on Seacoast Drive. Entertainment included local bands performing on the main stage at Pier Plaza.

== Location ==
Imperial Beach, California is the most southwestern city in the continental United States and is located 12 miles south of downtown San Diego.

== See also ==
- Magdalen Islands sandcastle competition
