= Naval Outlying Landing Field Imperial Beach =

US Navy airfield in California, United States

- Ream Field
- Part of Naval Base Coronado
- Imperial Beach, California in the United States
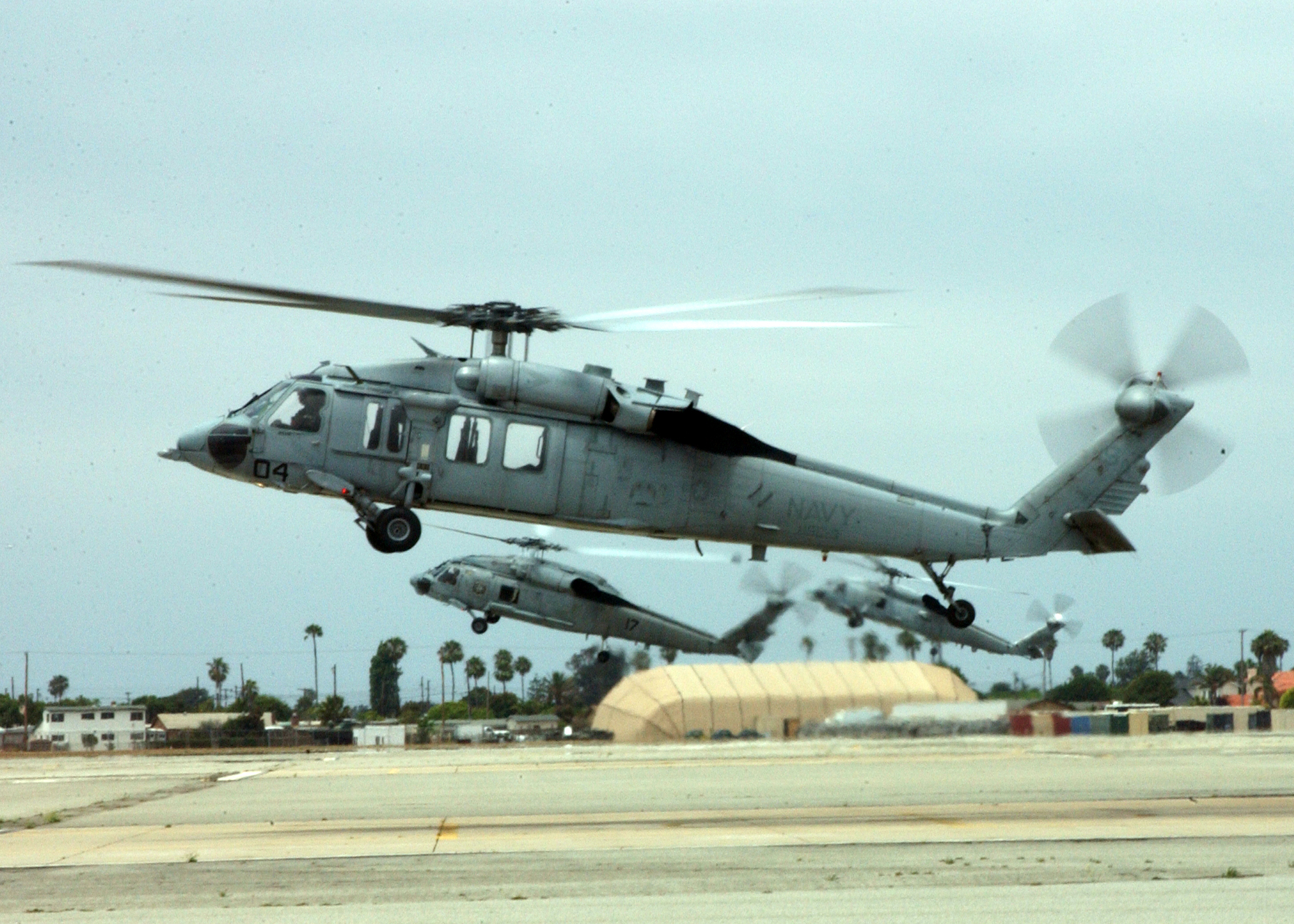
- An MH-60S Seahawk, assigned to HSC-3, along with two other Seahawk, practice landings at NOLF Imperial Beach

Site information
- Type: Naval Outlying Landing Field
- Owner: Department of Defense
- Operator: US Navy
- Controlled by: Navy Region Southwest
- Condition: Operational
- Website: Official website

Location
- Location in the United States
- Coordinates: 32°33′48″N 117°06′42″W

Site history
- Built: 1917 (as Aviation Field)
- In use: 1917 – present

Garrison information
- Current commander: Captain John DePree

Airfield information
- Identifiers: IATA: NRS, ICAO: KNRS, FAA LID: NRS, WMO: 722909
- Elevation: 7.3 metres (24 ft) AMSL
Runways
Direction	Length and surface
09/27	1,523 metres (4,997 ft) Concrete
08/26	682.7 metres (2,240 ft) Porous European Mix
- Other airfield facilities: Unimproved Landing Zone (Beach LZ)

Naval Outlying Landing Field (NOLF) Imperial Beach (IATA: NRS, ICAO: KNRS, FAA LID: NRS) is a United States Navy facility for helicopters, situated on 1,204 acres (5 km^{2}) approximately 14 miles (23 km) south of San Diego and within the city limits of Imperial Beach, California. It is known as "The Helicopter Capital of the World".

== Mission statement ==
The mission of NOLF Imperial Beach is to handle the overflow of helicopter squadron traffic (VFR and IFR) from NAS North Island. As a result, the helicopter squadrons at North Island perform 95% of their operations at Imperial Beach.

== History ==
In 1917, the United States Army established Aviation Field on the current site of OLF Imperial Beach. Aviation Field was used for air gunnery practices (among other activities) by the Army and was kept active throughout World War I. In 1918, it was renamed in honor of Army Major William Roy Ream, the first flying surgeon of the American Army and the first flight surgeon killed in an aircraft accident.

In the early 1920s the Navy began using Ream Field to practice carrier landings. The field was not as advantageous for expansion as was Brown Field, 8 miles (13 km) inland, and did not develop further until World War II.

In 1943, the present runways were built and construction on the buildings began. On 17 July 1943 Naval Auxiliary Air Station Ream Field was commissioned. By 12 April 1946 the station had 78 buildings and four airstrips consisting of runways, one oriented northwest by southeast and the other oriented northeast by southwest, both of which were 2500 by 500 feet (150 m). In addition to the four runways, 82,730 square yards of aircraft parking area were built.

Shortly after World War II, Ream Field was decommissioned. In 1951, it was recommissioned as an Auxiliary Landing Field, and in 1955 was re-designated as Naval Auxiliary Air Station Imperial Beach.

In 1951, Ream Field Imperial Beach became home to its first helicopter squadron when HU-1 moved aboard. HS-2 and HS-4 were also commissioned there in 1952. They were followed by many others, HS-6 and HS-8 in 1956, and HS-10 in 1960.

In 1967, the oldest of the helicopter squadrons, HC-1, commissioned in 1948 at NAS Lakehurst, was divided into five squadrons, HC-3, HC-5, HC-7, HA(L)-3 and HC-1 and brought aboard at Imperial Beach. (note: HC-1, HC-3 and HC-5 were home based at Imperial Beach, while HC-7 was home based at NAS Atsugi, Japan until March 1971, moving to NAS Imperial Beach and HA(L)-3 was home based at Binh Thuy Air Base, South Vietnam since 1 April 1967 and was never US based.

On January 1, 1968, NAAS Imperial Beach was raised to the status of Naval Air Station and renamed NAS Imperial Beach. The mission of NAS Imperial Beach was to support operations of Naval aviation activities and units. In this capacity it was home to seven helicopter squadrons, eventually to become home to ten squadrons, all of the Navy west coast helicopter squadrons. The station also supported a Naval Air Maintenance Training Detachment and a Fleet Airborne Electronics Training Unit. At that time NAS Imperial Beach had a total complement of approximately 3400 military personnel.

On August 1, 1974, NAS Imperial Beach was once again re-designated as a Naval Auxiliary Landing Field and in October 1975 was designated an Outlying Field (OLF Imperial Beach) and presently operates as a branch of Naval Base Coronado.

When Imperial Beach was re-designated as an Outlying Field, this put a halt to a master plan developed on 1967 to determine the facilities required to support units assigned by the Chief of Naval Operations. Under this plan, construction commenced on a new Enlisted Dining Hall and modern Bachelor Enlisted Quarters. In 1968, the control tower and operation building was completed, along with a new Enlisted Men's Club and a $1.2 million hangar was opened. Other building constructed under the plan were a new Bachelor Officer Quarters, a second hangar and a new Navy Exchange retail store with five times the floor space of the previous Navy Exchange.

Along with the halt of construction on base, the helicopter squadrons were moved to NAS North Island. Thus there was no further need for barracks, meal facilities, aircraft hangars and clubs. These new buildings were closed and all personnel associated with them were moved, and expected to use facilities at North Island. In 1977, the empty aircraft hangars were leased to Defense Property Disposal Office (DPDO), now the Defense Reutilization and Marketing Office (DRMO) of the Defense Logistics Agency for storage of excess and salvageable material. In 1978, almost half of the buildings on base (e.g., those east of Lexington Street) were leased to the US Department of Labor. The San Diego Job Corps Center was opened on this leased space in 1979.

In the early 2000s, naval activities external to Naval Aviation at OLF Imperial Beach were increased by the establishment and homeporting of Coastal Riverine Group ONE (CORIVGRU 1) and one of its subordinate squadrons, Coastal Riverine Squadron THREE (CORROVRON 3) at Imperial Beach.

Presently, OLF Imperial Beach encompasses 1,204 acres (5 km^{2}), with 270 of those acres leased out for agricultural purposes and 284 acres (1.1 km^{2}) leased to the State of California for a wildlife refuge at the southeast corner by the base.

== Tenant commands ==
- Maritime Security Group 1
- Explosive Ordnance Disposal Mobile Unit Eleven

== Border Naval Outlying Landing Field ==
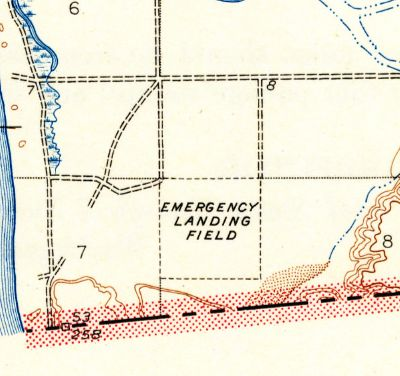
Border Naval Outlying Landing Field in 1943

Border Naval Outlying Landing Field - Border Field was built just south of Naval Outlying Landing Field Imperial Beach. Built and used during World War 2, it was used for dive bombing training, gunnery training with moving-targets and in dry weather for landing practice, also as an Emergency Landing pad. The base was also part of the US coastal defense system. On Bunker Hill on the east of Monument Mesa a 50 foot radar tower was built. There is no trace of the field remain and the land is not developed. The base was near the current Border Field State Park. Border Field was built in 1918 as a small airstrip.

== See also ==
- California during World War II
