= Wild Coast =

The Wild Coast can refer to:

- WildCoast is an international conservation non-profit organization based in California and Mexico. WILDCOAST conserves coastal and marine ecosystems and addresses climate change with natural solutions.
- The Wild Coast Region, Eastern Cape, a coastal region in Eastern Cape Province of South Africa
- The Wild Coast (Greyhawk), a fictional region located in the World of Greyhawk campaign setting for the Dungeons & Dragons role-playing game.
- The Guianas, a coastal region of the Caribbean in northern South America, historically called "The Wild Coast" (Dutch: De wilde kust).

== See also ==
- Wildcoast, an international conservation non-profit organization with offices in Del Mar, CA, Imperial Beach, California, Ensenada and Huatulco, Mexico. WILDCOAST is dedicated to protecting coastal and ocean habitat and the wildlife that lives there.
