= EXW =

EXW can stand for:

- Elite Xtreme Wrestling, now known as Future Stars of Wrestling. One of the tag team champions was Val Venus.
- Enlisted Expeditionary Warfare Specialist, a qualification badge of the U.S. Navy.
- Explosion welding, a solid state process where welding is accomplished by accelerating one of the components at extremely high velocity through the use of chemical explosives.
- EXW (commerce), an Incoterm describing a seller making goods available at its premises.
