= Sandra E. Adams =

American admiral

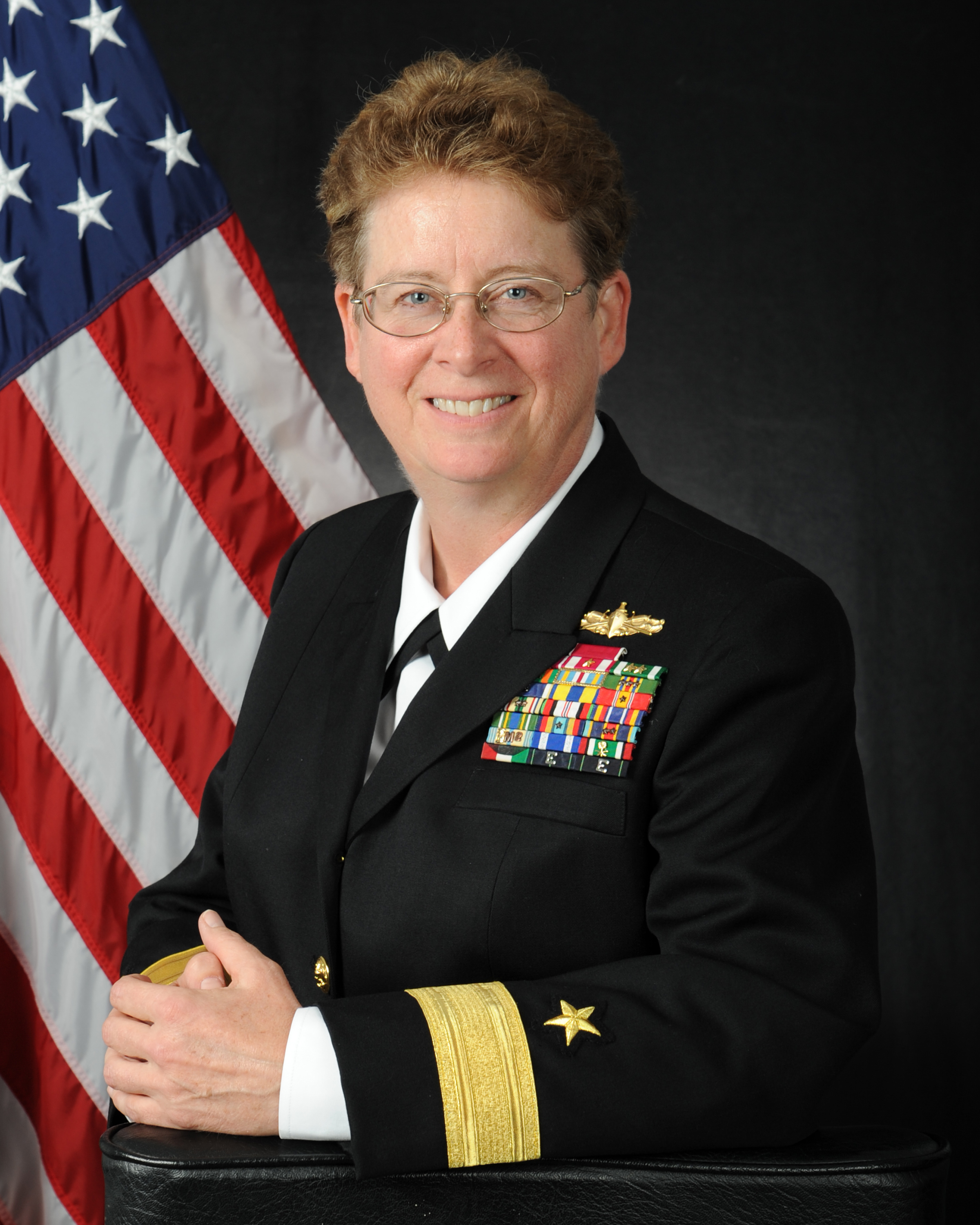
- Born: 1956 (age 69–70)
- Military career
- Allegiance: United States
- Branch: United States Navy
- Rank: Rear admiral (RDML)

Sandra Elizabeth Adams (born 1956) is a retired rear admiral in the United States Navy.

== Biography ==
She grew up in Okemos, Michigan, and graduated from Michigan State University in 1983. She received her commission in 1981 from Officer Candidate School and subsequently completed the Surface Warfare Officer School Basic course in Newport, Rhode Island.

Her first tour was aboard USS Puget Sound (AD-38) homeported in Italy as 6th Fleet flagship. She served as the 6th Fleet staff's Communications radio division officer, as the damage control assistant, and earned her Surface Warfare Officer designation. She also served as operations officer ashore at Readiness Support Group, Norfolk, Virginia.

Adams transitioned to the Naval Reserve (NR) in 1986 serving with NR Shore Intermediate Maintenance Activity Detachment 219, Long Beach, California. In 1990, she transferred to Mobile Inshore Undersea Warfare Unit 105 Long Beach, as vehicle maintenance officer. The unit was recalled to active duty and deployed to Saudi Arabia for Operations Desert Shield and Desert Storm where it provided harbor security for the U.S. Army's logistics seaport. After redeployment, she served as logistics officer and operations officer. She was selected as the Readiness Command 19 Reserve Officer Association Junior Officer of the Year in 1991 and 1992.

In 1992, she was selected for the first of five commands by serving as the Selected Reserve coordinator aboard USS Bolster (ARS-38). Adams also served as commanding officer of Mobile Inshore Undersea Warfare Unit 203, NR Naval Beach Group One Detachment 119, NR commander, Naval Forces Japan, and NR U.S. Pacific Command Detachment 120.

Adams has served on numerous operational staff positions including Naval Coastal Warfare Group One as N6; NR Navy Command Center Detachment 106 as a senior watch officer; NR Commander, Naval Forces Korea HQ as N3 operations officer and executive officer. She joined U.S. Joint Forces Command in 2008 as the J3 Senior Navy directorate leader.

In 2010, she mobilized in support of Operation Enduring Freedom to NATO Training Mission-Afghanistan. Based in Kabul, she served as the senior advisor to the Assistant Minister of Defense for Personnel and Education, a lieutenant general. She was selected to be the Reserve deputy commander, Navy Region Midwest, as her first flag assignment.

In 2013, Adams revealed her LGBT status and married her longtime girlfriend. After serving as an openly gay flag officer, she retired in 2015.

Adams earned her master's degree in national security and strategic studies from the Naval War College in 2003. She graduated from the Joint Forces Staff College Advanced Joint Professional Military Education 10-month course in 2009.

As a civilian, Adams is a director of supply chain for Raytheon Space and Airborne Systems.

Her personal decorations include the Legion of Merit, Defense Meritorious Service Medal (3 awards), Meritorious Service Medal (two awards), Navy and Marine Corps Commendation Medal (three awards), and Navy and Marine Corps Achievement Medal (3 awards).
