= Maritime Expeditionary Security Force =

U.S. Navy force protection unit

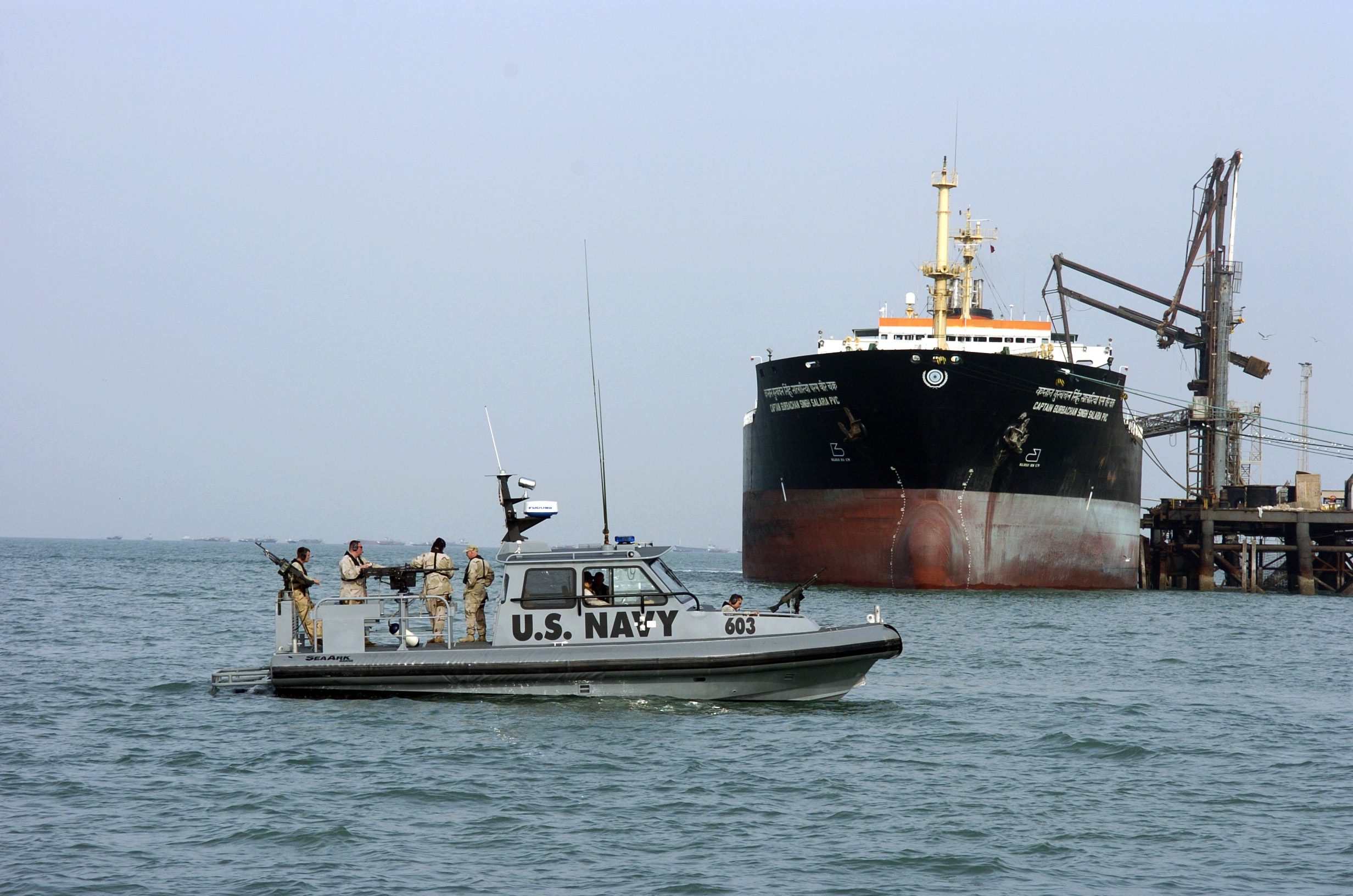
SeaArk patrol boat of Inshore Boat Unit (IBU) 22 in the Northern Persian Gulf in February 2008

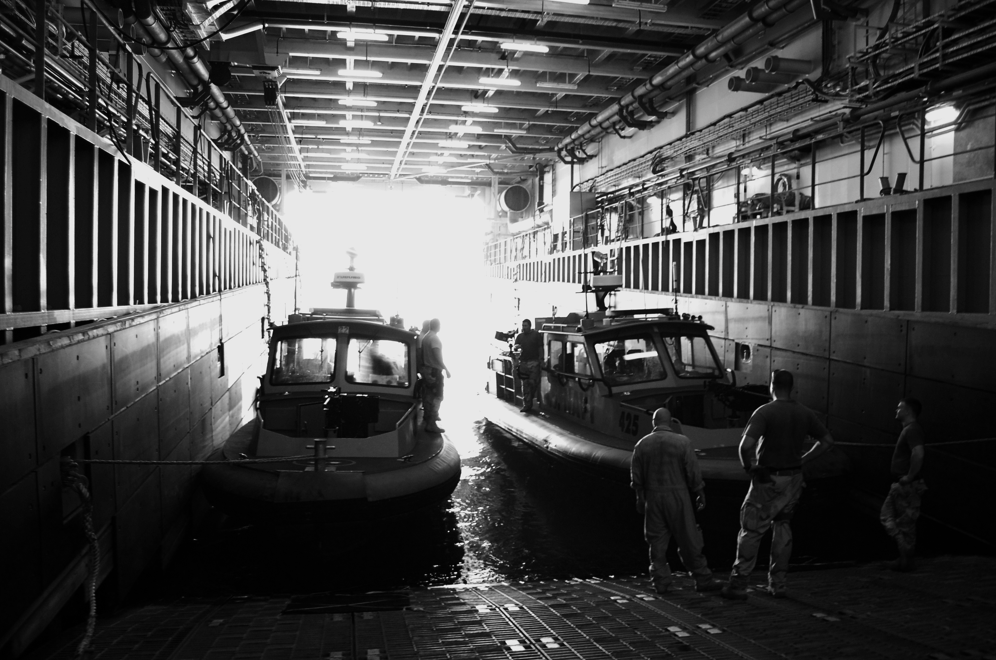
An Inshore Boat Units MESF boats docked onboard another vessel in the Northern Persian Gulf, July 2009

The Maritime Expeditionary Security Force (MESF) is a force within the United States Navy under the organizational structure of the Navy's Navy Expeditionary Combat Command. The MESF originated from the Naval Coastal Warfare community which transitioned to the MESF in 2020. The MESF's primary mission is force protection with deployed operations occurring around the world. Anti-terrorism and force protection missions include harbor and maritime infrastructure defense, coastal surveillance, and special missions. Specialized units work together with MESF squadron staffs providing intelligence and communications. MESF units deploy worldwide to detect, deter, and defend an area or unit. Recent locations include the United States, Panama, Korea, Saudi Arabia, Kuwait, Iraq, Afghanistan, Bahrain, United Arab Emirates, and Egypt.

MESF Sailor ratings range from Master-at-Arms, and Boatswain's Mates, to supporting rates like Engineman, Hospital Corpsmen,Information Technology Specialists and others. Units receive extensive training in small boat operations, combat medical and first responder care, small arms, crew-served weapons, and close quarters battle.

Two Maritime Expeditionary Security Groups in San Diego, California, and Virginia Beach, Virginia, provide centralized planning, control, training, coordination, equipping, and integration of deployable units trained to operate in high density, multi-threat environments. Units conduct force protection of strategic shipping and naval vessels operating in the inshore and coastal regions, anchorages and harbors, from bare beach to sophisticated port facilities. Members of this community are highly encouraged to earn their Expeditionary Warfare Specialist Designation.

== Organization ==
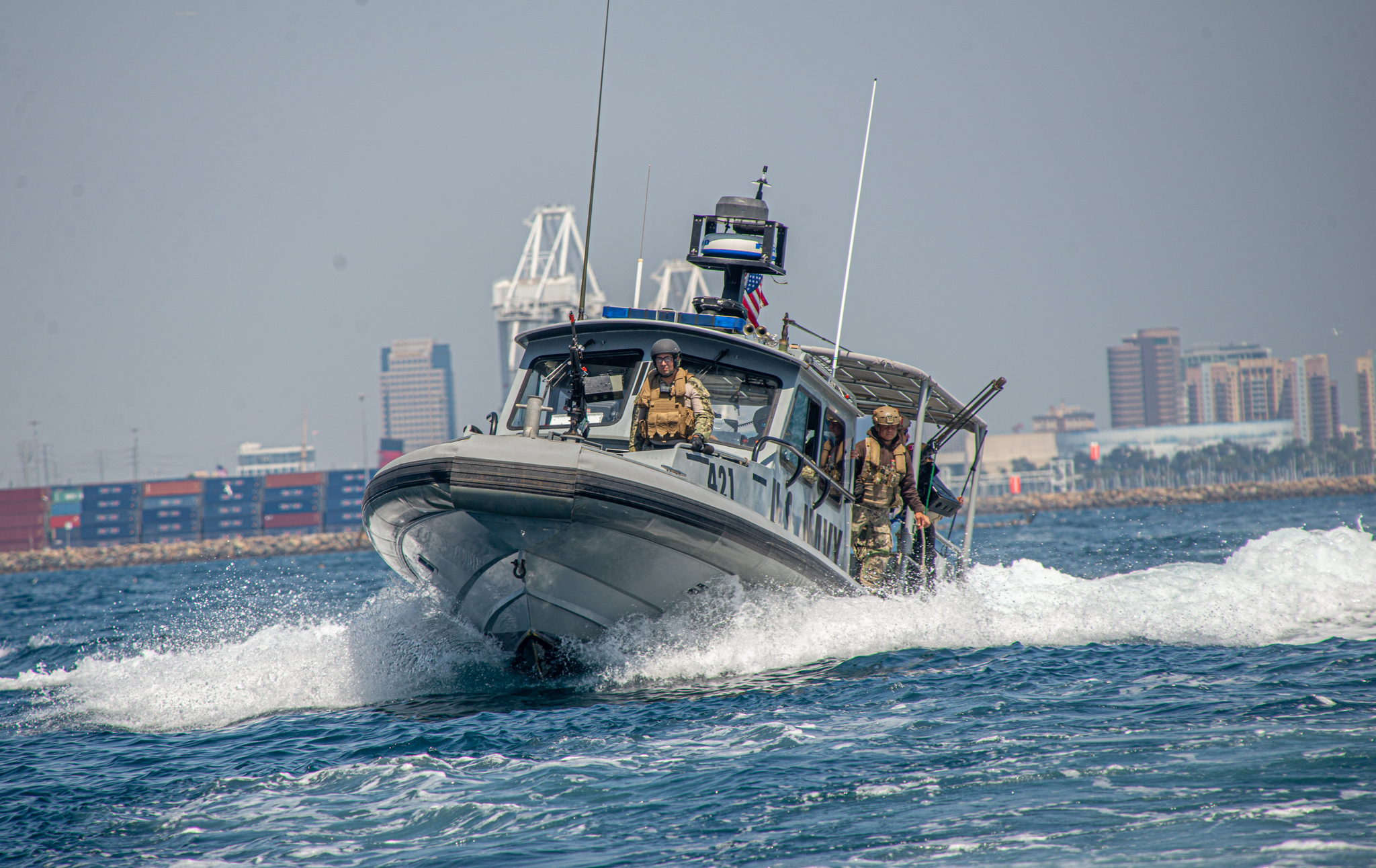
Sailors from MSRON 11 conduct training near Long Beach, California, in 2022

The MESF consists of two groups; one in San Diego and one in Virginia Beach. This includes two expeditionary security detachments in Guam and Bahrain; seven Maritime Expeditionary Security Squadrons (MSRON). Each MSRON has a HQ Company, three Boat Security Companies and a Security Platoon. The HQ company has a Command, Control, Communications, Computers and Intelligence, Surveillance and reconnaissance (C4ISR) platoon, an admirative platoon and a maintenance platoon. The Boat Security Companies have two platoons with four patrol boats per platoon and two crews per patrol boat. The Boat Security Companies conduct point defense, high value asset security and maritime interdiction operations. The Security Platoon has a Landward Security Team, Aircraft Security Team and Embark Security Team (EST). The EST conducts embarked security on military sealift vessels that do not have organic security embedded.

Maritime Expeditionary Security Group One (MESG 1), homeported in San Diego, California.

- Maritime Expeditionary Security Squadron One (MSRON 1)-- Naval Air Station North Island
- Maritime Expeditionary Security Squadron 11 (MSRON 11)-- Naval Weapons Station Seal Beach
- Maritime Expeditionary Security Squadron Three (MSRON 3) -- Naval Outlying Landing Field Imperial Beach
- Maritime Expeditionary Security Force Group One, Detachment Guam (MESF-1 DET Guam) in Naval Base Guam.

Maritime Expeditionary Security Group Two (MESG 2), homeported Joint Expeditionary Base Little Creek-Fort Story (JEBLC-FS) in Virginia Beach, Virginia.

- Maritime Expeditionary Security Squadron Two (MSRON-2) -- (Joint Expeditionary Base Little Creek-Fort Story)
- Maritime Expeditionary Security Squadron 4 (MSRON 4) -- (Joint Expeditionary Base Little Creek-Ft Story)
- Maritime Expeditionary Security Group Two, Detachment Bahrain (MESG 2 DET Bahrain)-- Naval Support Activity Bahrain

Reserve Squadrons:

- Maritime Expeditionary Security Squadron Eight (MSRON 8) -- Naval Station Newport Rhode Island
- Maritime Expeditionary Security Squadron Ten (MSRON 10) -- Naval Air Station Jacksonville

== See also ==
- Naval Coastal Warfare
- Coastal Riverine Force
- Mobile Inshore Undersea Warfare Unit
- Enlisted Expeditionary Warfare Specialist
- Expeditionary war
