= Naval Coastal Warfare (United States) =

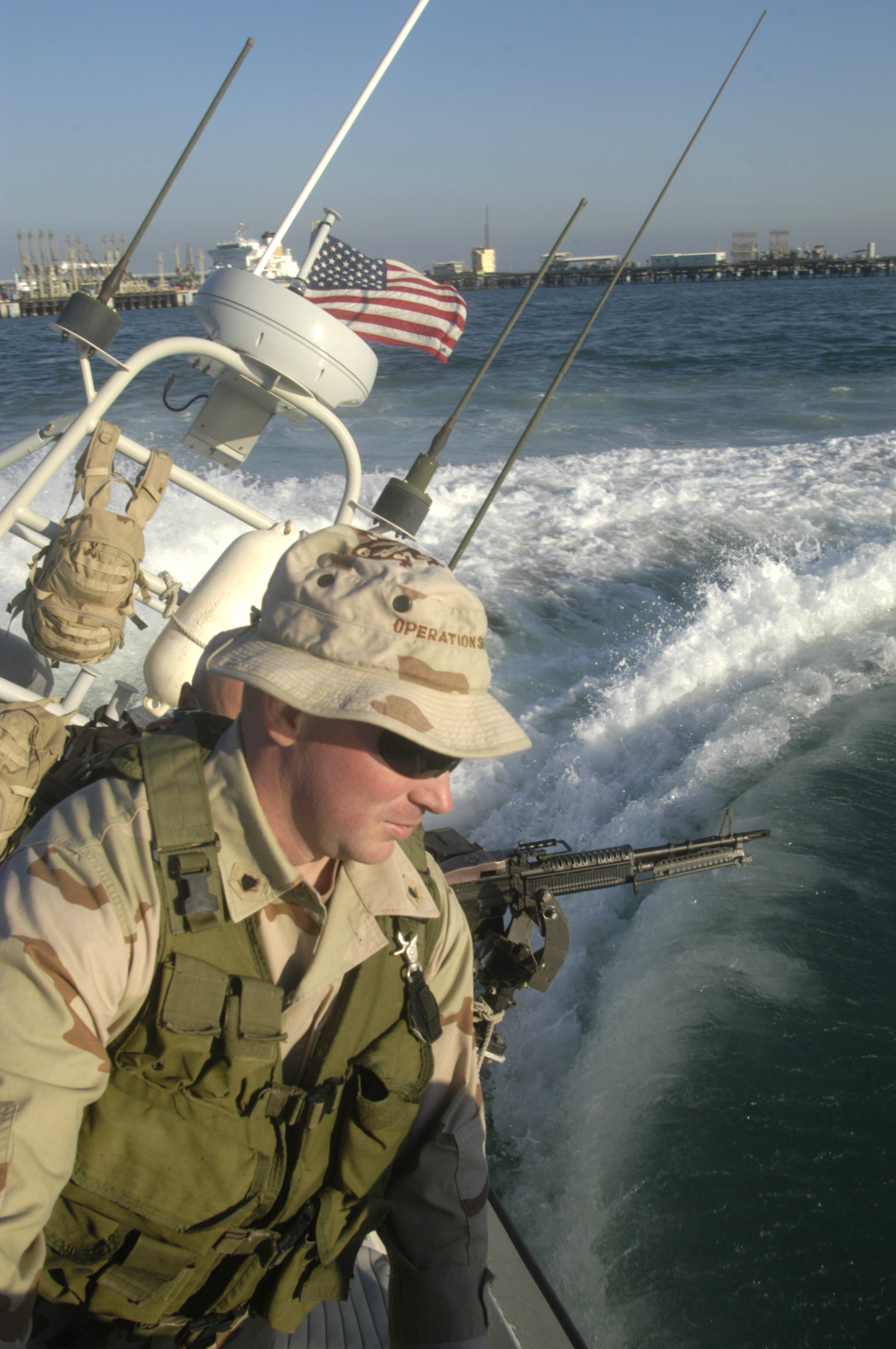
Naval Coastal Warfare Group One (NCWG 1) coastguardsman skillfully maneuvers a USCG inshore patrol boat while patrolling off the coast of Kuwait.

The Naval Coastal Warfare Community is a component of the United States Navy, part of the Navy Expeditionary Combat Command (NECC). The Navy's Maritime Expeditionary Security Force (MESF) is the main combat unit assigned to Naval Coastal Warfare (NCW).

The NCW mission is to protect strategic port facilities and strategic commercial shipping and naval ships in harbor approaches, at anchorages and in ports, from bare beach to sophisticated port facilities, in order to ensure the uninterrupted flow of cargo and personnel to the combatant commander. NCW operations protect these assets from waterborne threats. These operations occur in coastal areas outside the continental United States (OCONUS), in support of national policy, and are referred to as NCW expeditionary operations, and within the United States (US) as part of this nation's homeland security (HLS) and homeland defense (HLD).

The modern naval coastal warfare community was created in the early 2000s due to the bombing of the USS Cole and was under the Maritime Force Protection Command as Naval Coastal Warfare Groups. The Navy created the Navy Expeditionary Combat Command placing Naval Coastal Warfare Groups under it in 2006, also in 2006 the Navy stood up a Riverine Group. In 2012 the Navy merged Naval Coastal Warfare Groups and the Navy Riverine Group calling them the Coastal Riverine Force (CRF). In 2020 NCW underwent a major overhaul and transitioned units to the Maritime Expeditionary Security Force (MESF) as the Navy had dropped riverine operations, turning that mission over to the US Marine Corps. The units that were affected by this change ranged from Mobile Inshore Undersea Warfare Units to Inshore Boat Units.

== Description ==
NCW involves the employment of mobile sensor systems (e.g., radar, sonar, electronic warfare support (ES), and visual) and small, armed patrol craft to provide a surveillance and interdiction capability against waterborne threats in the inshore/coastal environment. NCW forces are linked with other naval surveillance assets and landside security and host nation (HN) forces to promote a seamless exchange of information and ensure deconfliction of friendly forces. The NCW organic command, control, communications, computers, and intelligence (C4I) capability provides a robust capability to coordinate surveillance and interdiction operations and develop a detailed near-real-time common tactical picture (CTP) of the coastal battlespace. NCW operations also support maritime pre-positioning force (MPF) and assault follow-on echelon (AFOE) offload operations, and submarine security missions.

The Chief of Naval Operations (CNO) established a new command, Commander Maritime Force Protection Command (COMARFPCOM) in 2005. This command is part of a realignment placing explosive ordnance disposal (EOD), expeditionary salvage, and NCW forces under one command with primary responsibility for Title 10 functions. COMARFPCOM centrally manages current and future readiness requirements for these three functional areas. NWP 3-10 defines core NCW forces as naval coastal warfare groups (NCWGRUs), naval coastal warfare squadrons (NCWRONs), mobile inshore undersea warfare units (MIUWUs), inshore boat units (IBUs), mobile security squadrons (MSSs), and mobile security detachments (MSDs). In some circumstances, the core NCW force may include USCG port security units (PSUs). In 2012 the Navy merged NCWGRUs with a Riverine Group that had been created in 2006 to form the Coastal Riverine Force (CRF).

Coastal Riverine Force (CRF) Squadrons (renamed in 2020 to MESF Squadrons) deploy worldwide to detect, deter, and defend an area, unit, or High Value Asset. Recent locations include the United States, Korea, Saudi Arabia, Kuwait, Bahrain, Iraq, Afghanistan, United Arab Emirates, Djibouti and Egypt.

Coastal Riverine Groups (CRG) One and Two (now MESG 1 & 2) provide centralized planning, control, training, coordination, equipping, and integration of coastal warfare assets trained to operate in high density, multi-threat environments. Units conduct force protection of strategic shipping and naval vessels operating in the inshore and coastal assets, anchorages and harbors, from bare beach to sophisticated port facilities.

Members of this community are highly encouraged to earn their Enlisted Expeditionary Warfare Specialist Designation.

== See also ==
- Mobile Inshore Undersea Warfare Unit
- Expeditionary war
