= Serge Dedina =

American politician

18th Mayor of Imperial Beach
- In office December 9, 2014 – December 2022
- Succeeded by: Paloma Aguirre

Personal details
- Born: 1964 (age 61–62) Los Angeles, California
- Party: Democratic
- Education: University of Wisconsin-Madison; University of Texas at Austin; University of California, San Diego
- Occupation: Conservationist
- Website: https://sergededina.com/

Serge Dedina is the Executive Director of Wildcoast, an international conservation team that conserves coastal and marine ecosystems and addresses climate change through natural solutions. He served as the Mayor of Imperial Beach, California from 2014 to 2022.

== Personal life ==
Dedina was born in 1964 in Los Angeles, California to a French father and a British mother. Dedina moved to Imperial Beach in 1971 and attended elementary, middle, and high school there. A 1982 graduate of Mar Vista High School, he was later inducted into the inaugural class of the Sweetwater Union High School District Hall of Fame in 2001. An avid surfer, Dedina worked as an Ocean Lifeguard for the City of Imperial Beach and the State of California from 1981 to 1993.

Dedina studied at the University of California, San Diego graduating with a B.A. in political science. Dedina also earned an M.S. in geography from the University of Wisconsin-Madison and a Ph.D. in geography from the University of Texas at Austin.

Dedina and his two brothers were raised as secular Jews; he now identifies as agnostic.

== Conservation ==
As a high school student in 1980 Dedina volunteered as part of a citizen's effort in Imperial Beach to halt the proposed development of the Tijuana Estuary as a marina. That year the estuary was declared a National Wildlife Refuge by the Reagan Administration under Interior Secretary James Watt. Dedina organized fellow surfers at Mar Vista High School in the early 1980s to oppose a proposed offshore breakwater for Imperial Beach. That campaign became the first victory of the fledgling Surfrider Foundation. Dedina later advocated for the creation of the South San Diego Wildlife Refuge at a time when a marina was proposed for the south end of San Diego Bay.

In 1996 after carrying out doctoral research on gray whale conservation in Baja California Sur, Mexico, Dedina was hired by The Nature Conservancy as Northwest Program Manager. In that position he supported the efforts of local conservation NGOs such as Pronature Noroeste, Isla A.C. and Mexico's National Protected Area Commission to develop stewardship programs for newly established Loreto Bay National Park, Isla Espiritu Santo, and Cabo Pulmo National Park.

Dedina co-founded WILDCOAST in 2000 with Wallace J. Nichols. One of the first projects WILDCOAST worked on was a successful campaign to halt the black market trade in sea turtle meat in northwest Mexico. The other focus of Dedina’s conservation efforts has been on coastal land protection in the Baja California peninsula. WILDCOAST has helped to protect more than 40 miles of the Valle de los Cirios coastline through private lands conservation as well as an additional 450,000 acres in Laguna San Ignacio, a UNESCO World Heritage Site. Dedina also helped develop the WILDCOAST conservation program in Oaxaca which is focused on the preservation of sea turtle nesting beaches such as Playa Morro Ayuta, recently established as a federal sea turtle sanctuary in Mexico.

Under Dedina’s leadership, WILDCOAST has emerged as a pioneer in the field of blue carbon based natural climate solutions work in California and Mexico. WILDCOAST is carrying out wetland restoration projects in San Diego County as well as mangrove restoration work in Baja California Sur and Oaxaca in Mexico.

Dedina received the SIMA Environmentalist of the Year Award, San Diego Zoological Society’s Conservation Medal as well as the California Coastal Commission’s “Coastal Hero” Award. He was also named a UC San Diego John Muir Fellow and honored as a Peter Benchley “Hero of the Seas.”

The author of Saving the Gray Whale, Wild Sea, and Surfing the Border, Dedina has been a commencement speaker at UC San Diego and a panelist and keynote speaker at the U.S. National Climate Adaptation Forum, UCLA Institute of the Environment, TEDx San Diego, California Coastal Resilience Conference and the International MPA Conference among others.

== Mayor of Imperial Beach ==
Dedina was elected Mayor of Imperial Beach, California, in November 2014. He served two terms until 2022, focusing on infrastructure, economic development, civic engagement and environmental protection.

Under his leadership Imperial Beach successfully sued the International Boundary and Water Commission for violations of the Clean Water Act in the Tijuana River. Additionally, Dedina helped make Imperial Beach the world’s first city to file a lawsuit against the fossil fuel industry for causing sea level rise.

However, it was his commitment to civic betterment and engagement that marked his tenure as Mayor.

"He hit the ground running on addressing basic city tasks such as paving alleys, removing graffiti and keeping streets clean. Thanks to support from his council colleagues and partnerships with community groups and regional boards, the city has literally turned more colorful.”
