= Wildcoast =

Non-profit organization in the United States

Wildcoast / Costasalvaje
- Founded: 2000
- Founder: Serge Dedina
- Type: 501(c)(3)
- Purpose: environmentalism, conservation
- Location: Imperial Beach, California
- Region served: California, Mexico
- Method: media campaigns, research, activism
- Website: Wildcoast.org

Wildcoast (stylized WILDCOAST) is an international non-profit environmental organization that conserves coastal and marine ecosystems and wildlife.

Headquartered in Del Mar, California, Wildcoast established a Mexican division in 2007, Costasalvaje A.C. in Ensenada to manage its conservation programs in Latin America.

Charity Navigator awarded Wildcoast its four-star charity ranking. The organization received the Excellence in Organizational Development Award from Nonprofit Management Solutions in 2006. It also received the San Diego Earthworks E.A.R.T.H. Award in 2007. In 2008, Wildcoast received the Green Wave Award from the Surfer's Path Magazine.

The "Don't Eat Sea Turtle" campaign featured model Dorismar

"Clean Water Now!" banners are frequently seen around Imperial Beach

The Lucha Libre El Hijo del Santo appears in many of Wildcoast's campaigns

== Campaigns ==
- Demanding an end to ocean pollution - Wildcoast's Clean Water Now! page
- Protecting sharks from exploitation - Wildcoast's Sharks... Killing Machines or Victims? page
- Defending the sea from toxic waste and overfishing - Wildcoast's Defiende el Mar page
- Saving endangered sea turtles - Wildcoast's Sea Turtles page
- Preserving the beautiful San Ignacio Lagoon - Wildcoast's Laguna San Ignacio page

== Conservation programs ==
=== Wildlands conservation ===
One of Wildcoast's primary missions is to preserve spectacular, undeveloped coastal areas throughout the peninsula of Baja California such as Bahía de los Ángeles, Bahía Concepción, Bahía Magdalena, Laguna San Ignacio and the North Central Pacific Coast. These are some of the most ecologically important coastal areas remaining on the planet and are teeming with wildlife including endangered species of sea turtles, whales and migratory birds. Inhabited by people who make their living from fishing, ranching, and ecotourism, these locations are threatened by megaresort construction, land speculation, energy development, and mining projects.

Working in partnership with local community-based organizations and landowners, Wildcoast provides support for land conservation projects such as easements, private reserves, concessions, and sustainable development projects. Many of Wildcoast conservation projects are carried out with members of ejidos, or communal agrarian cooperatives and private landowners to help them hold on to their ancestral land and receive financial incentives to protect the land from development. Wildcoast made history by working with the Laguna San Ignacio Conservation Alliance in the brokering of a deal to protect the entire 140,000-acre (570 km^{2}) territory of the Ejido Luis Echeverria in San Ignacio Lagoon. The legally binding deal is being praised as a model for conserving both the environment and the local way of life. San Ignacio is the world’s last undeveloped gray whale lagoon and a UNESCO World Heritage Site.

Along the North Central Coast of Baja California Wildcoast has protected more than 14 miles (23 km) of coastline through conservation easements. In addition, Wildcoast worked to halt a series of megaresort and marina projects slated for this region in Baja California that would have obliterated world-class coastal biodiversity sites..

=== Wildlife conservation ===
The focus of the Wildlife Conservation Program is to protect endangered marine species and their habitats. In 2006, Wildcoast carried out a wildly successful campaign "Defiende el Mar" (Defend the Sea) to support the creation of marine protected areas along the central coast of California and Mexico’s Gulf of California. The campaign took place at the 2006 Soccer World Cup in Germany involving partnerships with Mexican soccer stars, Jorge Campos and "Kikin" Fonseca, to promote marine protected areas. The campaign resulted in the establishment of a 1,200,000-acre (4,900 km^{2}) marine reserve in Bahía de los Ángeles in the Sea of Cortez and a network of marine reserves near the coast of Monterey and Santa Cruz in California. Jorge Campos, one of the world’s greatest goalies, received the Monterey Bay Aquarium's Environmental Hero award for his work with Wildcoast to defend the ocean. From 2007-2008 the Wildcoast pro-MPA campaign featured Mexican wrestler El Hijo del Santo who has ardently campaigned for new marine reserves in California and marine conservation in Mexico.

The Wildcoast "Don’t Eat Sea Turtle" campaign, an ongoing effort to reduce the demand for sea turtle eggs and meat throughout Mexico and Latin America received worldwide attention with its celebrity spokespeople, model Dorismar, and musicians Maná and Los Tigres del Norte. The campaign featured public service announcements, posters, post cards, advertisements on bus stops, and a conference and press event in Acapulco – a center for the black market trade in sea turtle eggs. Randy Olson of Shifting Baselines called the campaign the "best ocean campaign in human history".

Wildcoast has launched a new initiative to protect sharks. This campaign resulted in the cessation of a shark massacre in the Mexican state of Guerrero after an American surfer was killed in a shark attack in May 2008.

Recently, Wildcoast has also focused on the establishment of Marine Protected Areas in California. A science-based network of Marine Protected Areas is critical to ensure the survival of marine wildlife into the future as well as maintaining Southern California’s greatest resource.

=== Coastal conservation ===
Every year thousands of Californians are exposed to hazardous waste, viruses, and bacteria contained in the millions of gallons of untreated water that flows daily into our ocean. Recreational ocean users and people fishing along the US-Mexico border are those most affected. The Coastal Conservation Program was developed to raise awareness of the public and environmental health risks associated with the pollution, to create a dialogue among stakeholders – residents, businesses, government agencies and to promote national media attention on a problem that threatens our communities and is often dismissed as an insurmountable problem.

Wildcoast proposes solutions to the pollution associated with increasing levels of urban and industrial development in the Californias. In 2006, Wildcoast launched the "Clean Water Now!" campaign along the U.S.-Mexico border to reduce the exposure of children to toxic sewage and to reduce beach closures in the region. As part of the campaign, they helped to pressure a contractor into cleaning up collector systems along the U.S.-Mexico border for renegade sewage flows.

In the ongoing effort to promote community involvement in clean water solutions along the US-Mexico Border, Wildcoast held three community forums for residents to discuss the issues and solicit involvement. More than 100 people attended the forums and pledge support for the campaign. In addition, Wildcoast sponsored the 2nd Annual Kids for Clean Water Surf Contest and the 4th Annual Dempsey Holder Memorial Expression Session and Ocean Festival. More than 600 people from all walks of life gathered to learn more about ocean pollution and ways to clean it up. In 2008, Senator Dianne Feinstein with the support of the White House appropriated more than $66 million to upgrade the sewage treatment facility along the U.S.-Mexico border.

Wildcoast is a member of the Save San Onofre. A coalition to halt the development of a toll road that would seriously impact the fabled Trestles surf break and San Onofre State Park in Orange County, California. The campaign included a trip to Sacramento to ask that legislators stop the toll road project as well as participation in the massive "Big Wednesday" protest at the Del Mar Fairgrounds against the Toll Road in February 2008.

== Media ==
Wildcoast is noted for its ability to work with the media in English and Spanish to bring attention to pressing coastal and marine conservation issues of global concern. The New York Times, The Wall Street Journal, Associated Press, BBC News, National Public Radio, NBC Nightly News, The Today Show, CBS News, Good Magazine, and Newsweek have reported on the work of Wildcoast. In addition, the organization is a frequent guest on television networks Televisa, TV Azteca, Azteca America, Univision, and Telemundo to promote ocean and marine conservation.

== Popular culture ==
Wildcoast worked with the cast and crew of the HBO series John from Cincinnati while filming took place in Imperial Beach. Wildcoast's "Clean Water Now" signs are displayed prominently in the Yost surf shop and Wildcoast T-shirts, staff members and events also make appearances. The opening credits feature Wildcoast "eco-lucha libre" stars in the ring.
