= Magdalen Islands sandcastle competition =

Annual sandcastle competition in Magdalen Islands

The Magdalen Islands sandcastle competition is an annual tourist event held at the Sandy Hook beach on L'Île-du-Havre-Aubert in the Magdalen Islands. It is claimed to be the biggest sandcastle building competition in the world.

== History ==
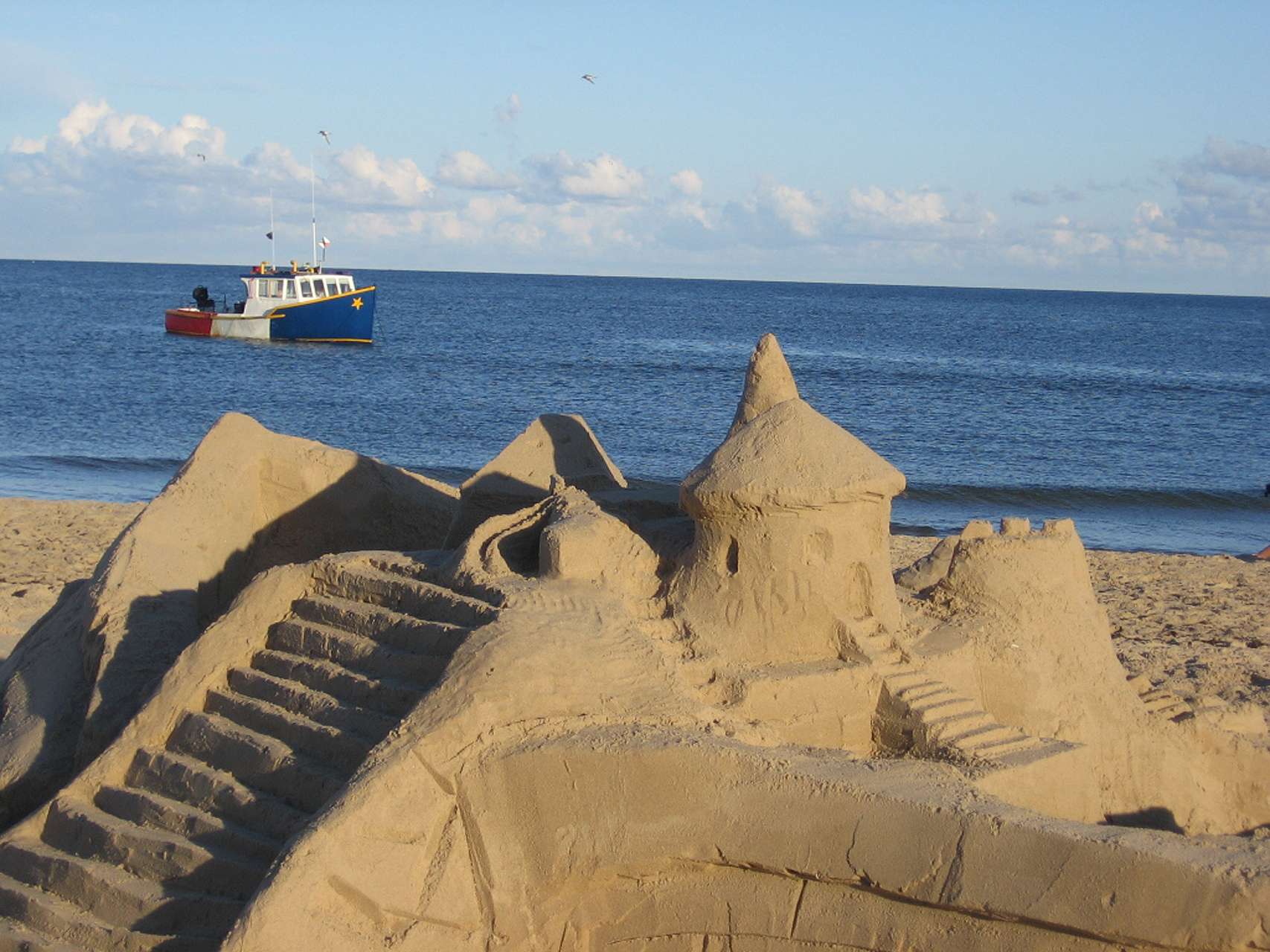
In 2007, there were over 17,000 visitors and more than 50 teams competed.

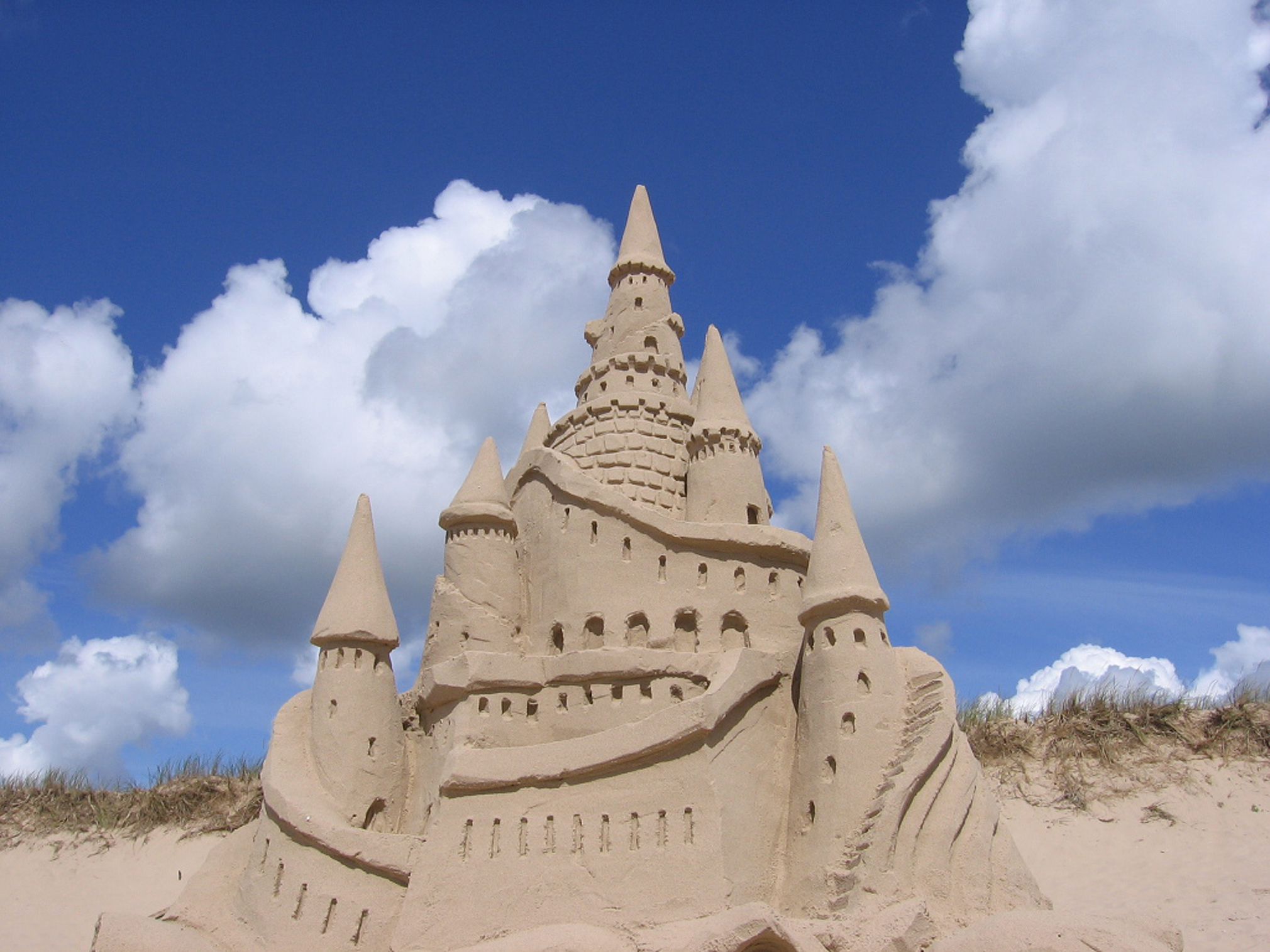
The castle of the winning team, 2005.

The first competition took place on August 15, 1987, and attracted over 1000 visitors. Started by Nicole Grégoire, Albert Cummings and Claude Bourque, who wanted to have a free family event in the Magdalen Islands. The initial budget was only $17,000, and had 21 different teams totaling 400 participants.

In 1989, only 2 years after the first competition, the number of visitors had surpassed 10,000. That same year, the founders gave the Corporation Châteaux de Sable des Iles the mandate to continue the event and since then the event takes place on the last weekend of the Acadian Festival.

In 2020, a virtual competition was held instead due to COVID-19.

== Procedure ==
The competition is held on the second weekend of August, from Friday to Saturday. A sandcastle construction workshop and tips for making a good sandcastle are given by a specialist on Friday afternoon. Teams then use the rest of Friday to sculpt the mound of sand the castle or structure is built upon, and Saturday is used for sculpting the structure. The awards ceremony takes place at around 4:30 pm the same day.

There are three categories of participants: Family, Adult and Freestyle, the latter not having to build a castle. Participants of the adult class must make their castle at least 1 meter high. All awards given out are chosen by the public. There is also a prize for the team with the best animation, such as music and costumes. Finally, there are participation awards given by the sponsors.
