= Allen Holder =

Early 20th century American surfer

Personal information
- Nickname: Allen Dempsey Holder
- Born: Allen Holder; 1920 Lubbock, Texas
- Died: 1997 (aged 76–77)

Surfing career
- Sport: Surfing

Allen "Dempsey" Holder (1920–1997) was one of the earliest surfers in San Diego, California's south county. He was one of the first surfers to ride the big surf off the coast of the Tijuana sloughs in 1937. Dempsey was also head of the Imperial Beach lifeguard services for many years. The public safety building that houses sheriff and lifeguard services is now named after Dempsey for his important contributions to surfing and public safety.
