= Enlisted Expeditionary Warfare Specialist =

Warfare qualification awarded to enlisted personnel in the U.S. Navy

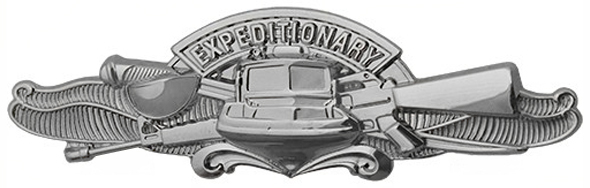
Enlisted Expeditionary Warfare Specialist

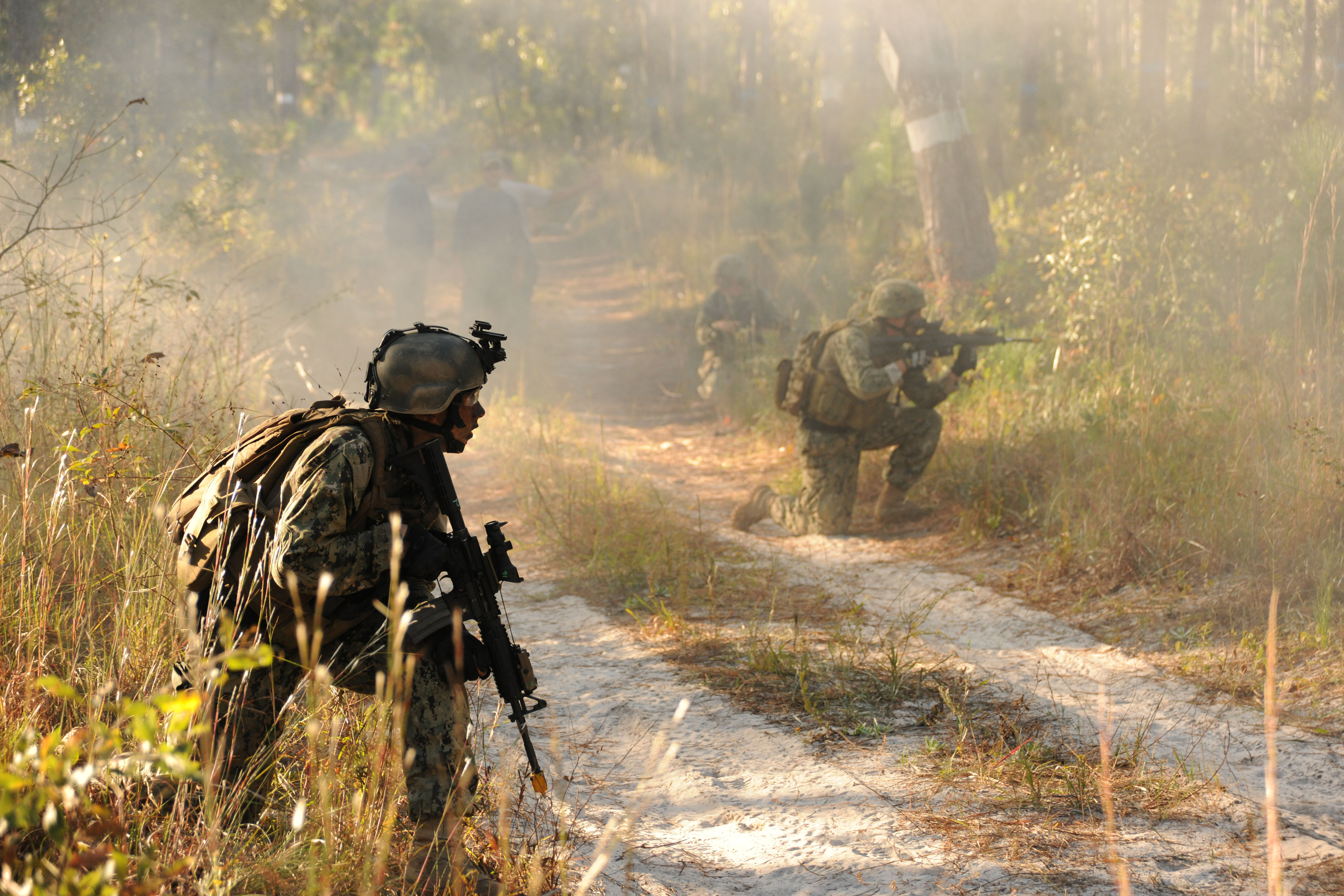
Sailors train at Camp Lejeune for RCS for combat skills, offensive and defensive patrolling, and communications.

The EXW qualification (referred to as Expeditionary Warfare Specialist) is a warfare qualification awarded to enlisted United States Navy, and United States Coast Guard personnel assigned to U.S. Navy expeditionary combat units, who satisfactorily complete the required qualification course and pass a qualification board hearing. The program was approved July 31, 2006 by then-Chief of Naval Operations Adm. Michael Mullen.

The qualification was developed to provide a chance for enlisted sailors in the naval service's Expeditionary Combat community (those serving in a maritime security or combat related role) to earn a warfare qualification. Core qualification skills will include weapons qualification and maintenance, marksmanship, land navigation, patrolling, field communications, and expeditionary camp deployment.

The first awardee was Petty Officer 2nd Class (EXW/SW) Carl P. Hurtt, Jr, assigned to Mobile Security Squadron Seven (MSS-7).

== Types of Expeditionary Warfare Specialist Qualification Platforms ==
Navy Expeditionary Combat Command (NECC) units, including:

- Maritime Expeditionary Security Groups / Squadrons
- Navy Expeditionary Intelligence Command (NEIC)
- Explosive Ordnance Disposal Mobile Units
- Naval Mobile Construction Battalions
- Mobile Diving and Salvage Units
- Navy Expeditionary Logistics units (includes Navy Cargo Handling Battalions, Navy Expeditionary Logistic Regiments, NAVELSG, and Expeditionary Communications Detachments)

Naval Special Warfare units.

== Breast insignia ==
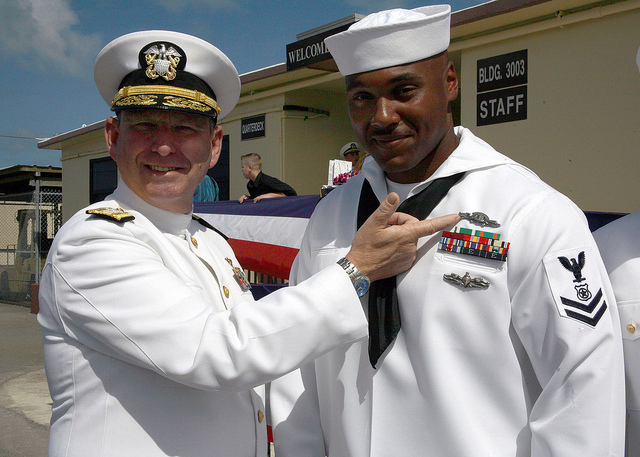
Rear Adm. Donald Bullard, Commander, Navy Expeditionary Combat Command (NECC), displays the Expeditionary Warfare pin, during a ceremony on board U.S. Naval Base Guam.

The design of the new pin encompasses the essence of enlisted expeditionary sailors, presenting the bow and superstructure of a Sea Ark 34' patrol boat from Inshore Boat Units superimposed upon a crossed cutlass and M16A1 rifle. The waves represent the Navy's heritage, the cutlass represents the enlisted force, the M16A1 represents an NECC mission area and the boat, another NECC mission area. The background is the traditional ocean swells of the Enlisted Surface Warfare Specialist badge.

== See also ==
- List of United States Navy enlisted warfare designations
- Badges of the United States Navy
- Badges of the United States Coast Guard
- Port Security Unit
- Uniforms of the United States Navy
- Military badges of the United States
- Naval Coastal Warfare
- Mobile Inshore Undersea Warfare Unit
- Maritime Expeditionary Security Force
- Expeditionary warfare
