= Mobile Inshore Undersea Warfare Unit =

Component of the US Navy's Force Protection Package

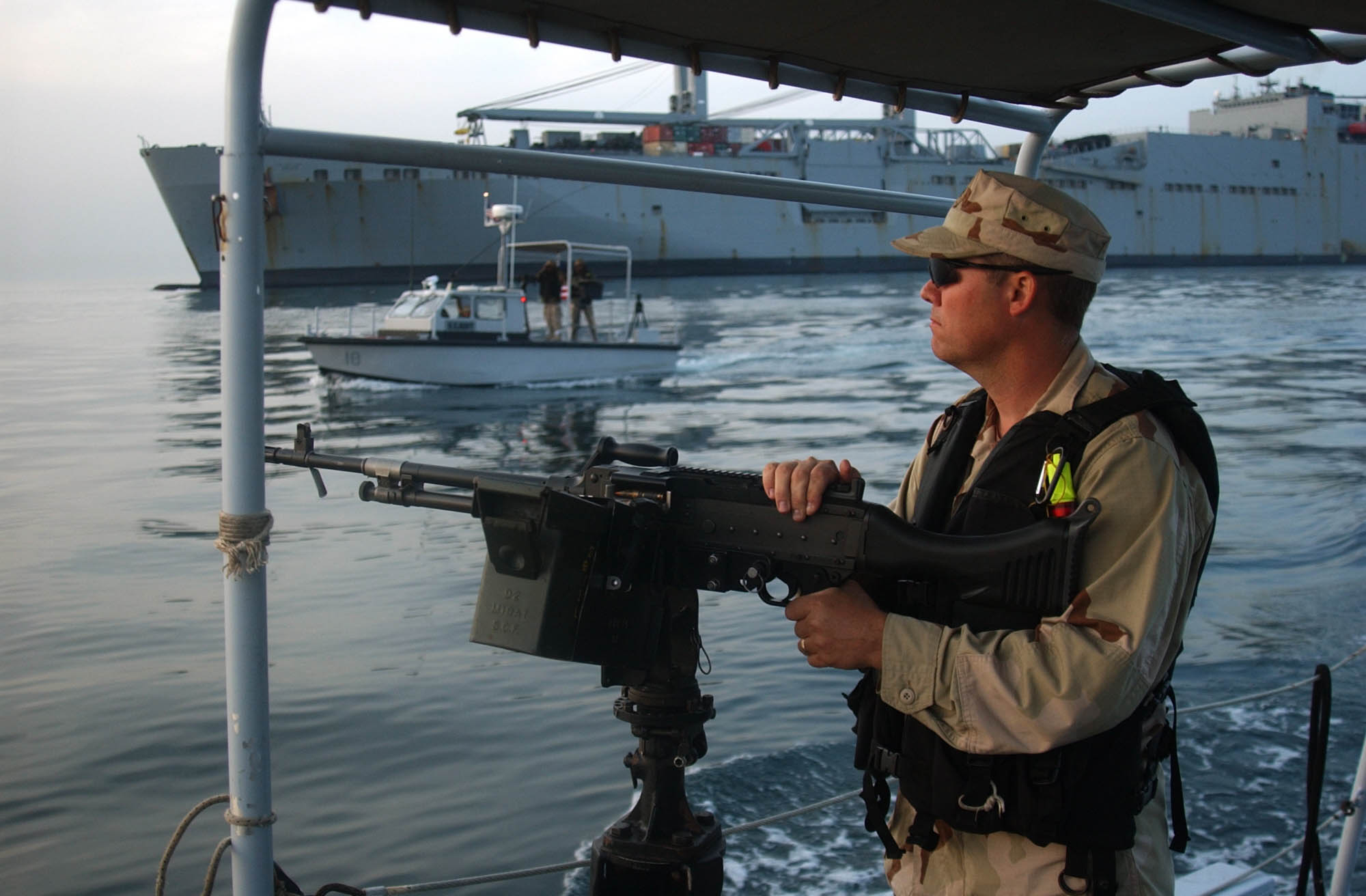
Mobile Inshore Undersea Warfare Unit One Zero Eight (MIUWU_108) providing seaboard anti-terrorism security

A Mobile Inshore Undersea Warfare Unit (MIUWU) was a component of the United States Navy's Force Protection Package tasked with providing seaward security to joint logistics over-the-shore operations from either a port or harbor complex or unimproved beach sites. The mobile inshore undersea warfare unit often made up of all USN and USNR rates including Seabees are equipped with mobile logistics, radar, sonar, and communications equipment located within mobile elements, such as a tent, specially modified HMMWV, or truck-mountable container. Once deployed the unit is stationed until the security issue is resolved.

== Units ==
- Group One (West)
  - MIUWU 101 - Seattle WA
  - MIUWU 102 - Spokane WA
  - MIUWU 103 - San Francisco CA
  - MIUWU 104 - San Jose CA
  - MIUW Unit 11 - San Diego CA
  - MIUWS Unit 11 - Long Beach CA
  - MIUWS Unit 12 - Long Beach CA
  - MIUWS Unit 13 - Long Beach CA
  - MIUWU 106 - San Diego CA
  - MIUWU 107 - San Diego CA
  - MIUWU 108 - Corpus Christi TX
  - MIUWU 109 - Dallas TX
  - MIUWU 110 - Portland OR
  - MIUWU 112 - St. Louis MO
  - MIUWU 113 - Oklahoma City OK
  - MIUWU 114 - Whiteman AFB MO
- Group Two (East)
  - MIUWU 201 - Perrysburg OH
  - MIUWU 202 - Newport RI
  - MIUWU 203 - Bronx NY
  - MIUWU 204 - Fort Dix NJ
  - MIUWU 205 - Charleston SC
  - MIUWU 206 - Norfolk VA
  - MIUWU 207 - Jacksonville FL
  - MIUWU 208 - Hialeah FL
  - MIUWU 209 - Mobile Ala.
  - MIUWU 210 - Fort McHenry MD
  - MIUWU 211 - Charlotte NC
  - MIUWU 212 - Gulfport MS
  - MIUWU 213 - Milwaukee, WI
  - MIUWU 214 - Buffalo NY

== See also ==
- United States Navy
- Naval Coastal Warfare
- Enlisted Expeditionary Warfare Specialist
- Maritime Expeditionary Security Force
- Expeditionary war
