= Imperial Beach, California =

City in California, United States

- City
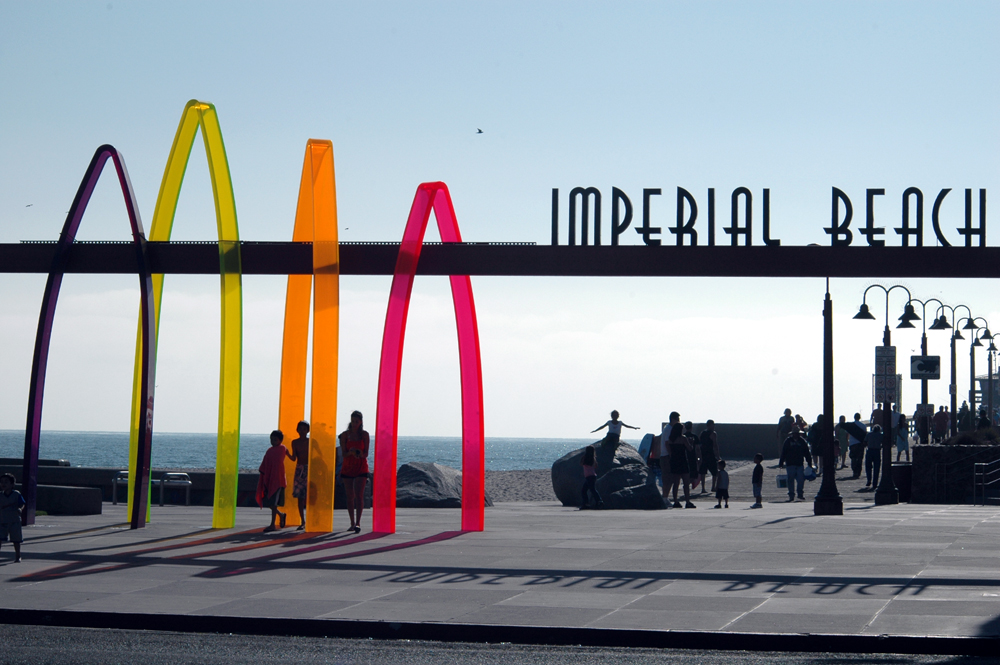
- "Surfhenge" in Imperial Beach, 2008

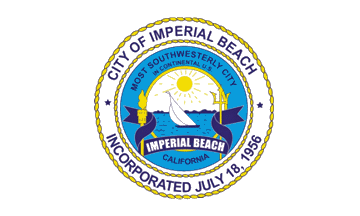
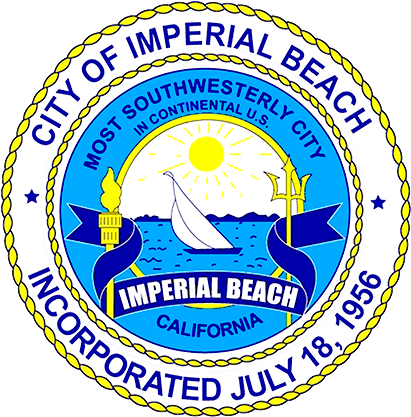
- Flag Seal
- Motto: "Classic Southern California"
- Interactive map of Imperial Beach, California
- Location within California Location within the United States
- Coordinates: 32°34′42″N 117°7′2″W
- Country: United States
- State: California
- County: San Diego
- Founded: June 1, 1887
- Incorporated: July 18, 1956

Government
  - Type: Council-Manager
  - Mayor: Mitch McKay (Unelected)
  - City council: Matthew Leyba-Gonzalez; Mariko Nakawatase (Unelected); Carol Seabury; Jack Fisher

Area
  - City: 4.41 sq mi (11.42 km^{2})
  - Land: 4.29 sq mi (11.11 km^{2})
  - Water: 0.12 sq mi (0.30 km^{2}) 2.67%
- Elevation: 20 ft (6 m)

Population (2020)
  - City: 26,137
  - Density: 6,093/sq mi (2,353/km^{2})
  - Metro: SD-TJ: 5,105,768
- Time zone: UTC-08:00 (PST)
  - Summer (DST): UTC-07:00 (PDT)
- ZIP code: 91932
- Area code: 619
- FIPS code: 06-36294
- GNIS feature IDs: 1660788, 2410098
- Website: imperialbeachca.gov

Imperial Beach is a beach city in San Diego County, California, United States, with a population of 26,137 as of the 2020 census. It is in the South Bay area of San Diego County, 14.1 miles (22.7 km) south of downtown San Diego and 5 miles (8 km) northwest of downtown Tijuana, Mexico. Imperial Beach is the southernmost city in California and the West Coast of the United States.

== History ==
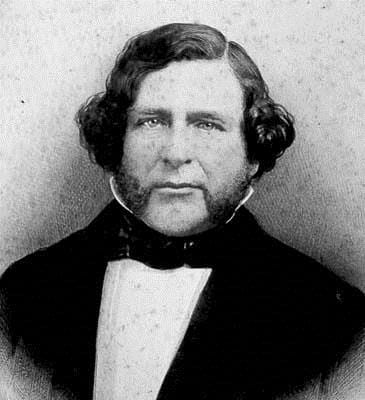
Rancho Melijo, which encompassed all of modern-day Imperial Beach, was granted to Californio ranchero Santiago E. Argüello in 1833.

Imperial Beach sits on the traditional territory of the Kumeyaay people, who had established the village of Alyshuwii. Founded in June 1887, the city takes its name from Imperial County, California, a desert climate 100 miles (161 km) east. Farmers and land owners from the Imperial Valley came to the area in the late 1880s seeking cooler weather during summer months. In March 1887, over 2,000 laborers descended upon nearby Coronado, California to construct the Hotel del Coronado, the largest resort in the world at the time. A large number of the workers stayed in Imperial Beach and some would later make it their permanent homestead. The city would incorporate in 1956, operating its own mayor–council government providing city fire department service and policing by the formation of its own police department but eventually, years later, through the contracting of services through the San Diego County Sheriff's Department.

Imperial Beach has undergone a makeover to become more visitor-friendly and commercially viable. In 2004, the city began implementing a community redevelopment plan to improve the commercial corridor along Palm Avenue and Seacoast Drive. Aside from a few smaller hotels, Imperial Beach remains a highly residential city with little hotel or motel accommodation for visitors. On September 13, 2010, after many years of planning, demolition officially began on the old Seacoast Inn located off Seacoast Drive. Construction of a $22 million hotel called Pier South Resort was completed in the former Seacoast Inn's place in December 2013.

== Geography ==
Imperial Beach is the most southwesterly located city in the continental United States. According to the United States Census Bureau, the city has a total area of 4.4 square miles (11.4 km^{2}). 4.3 square miles (11.1 km^{2}) of it is land and 0.12 square miles (0.3 km^{2}) of it (2.67%) is water. The city occupies the extreme southwest corner of the continental United States: bordered by Playas de Tijuana and Tijuana to the south, Coronado, California, and San Diego Bay to the north, San Diego to the east, and the Pacific Ocean to the west.

Imperial Beach is located in San Diego County, the fifth most-populous county in the United States and part of the San Diego metropolitan area, the 17th largest metropolitan area in the United States with over 3 million people. It is also part of the San Diego–Tijuana region, the largest bi-national metropolitan area shared between the United States and Mexico with over 5 million people.

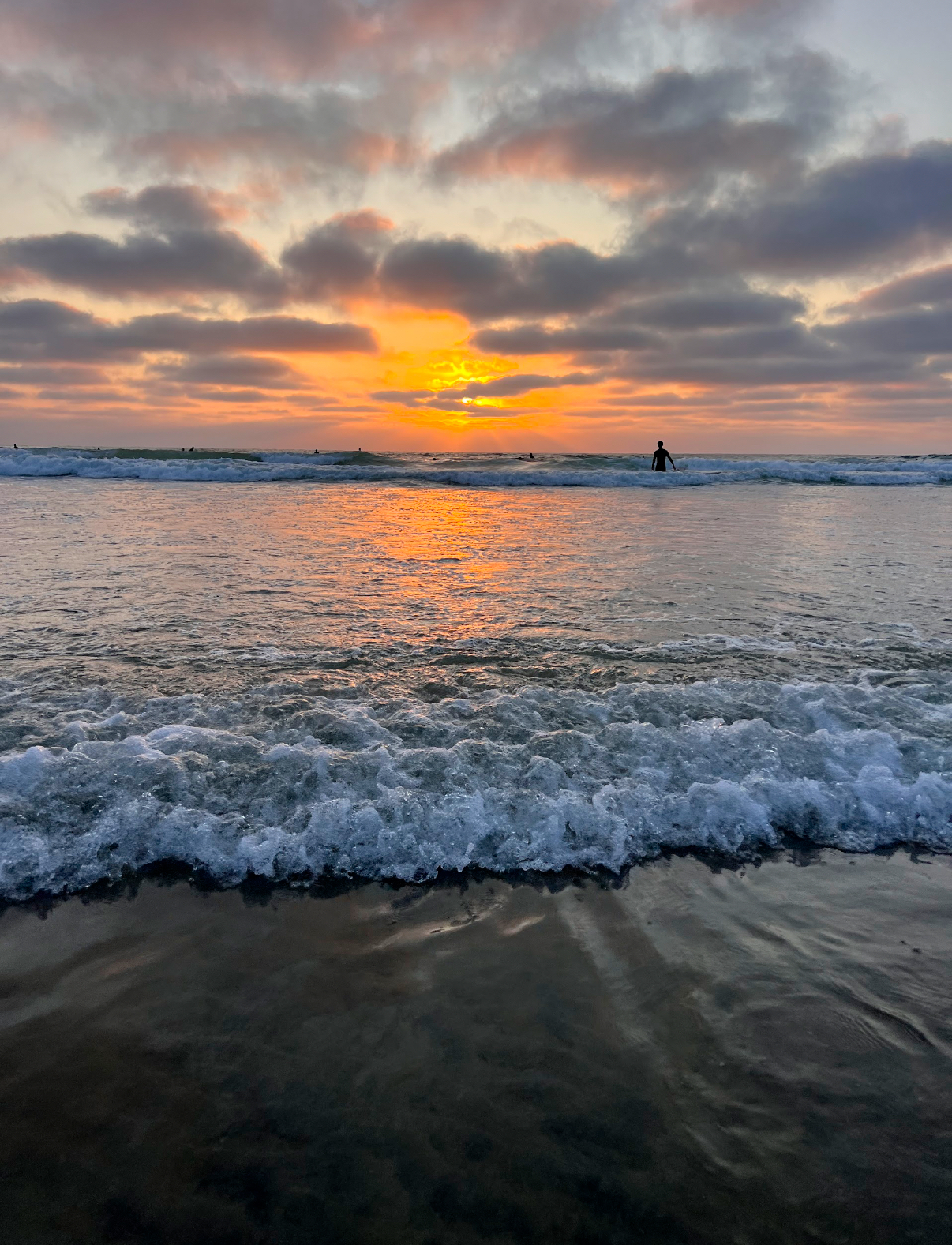
Sunset at Imperial Beach, CA, 2024

=== Climate ===
The city has a cool semi-arid climate (BSk), with summer temperatures often in the upper 70s °F (mid-20s °C) and winter temperatures in the 60s °F (15 to 20 °C). Because of the comfortable year-round temperatures, many homes in Imperial Beach are built without air conditioning. Imperial Beach often remains 10 degrees °F (5 degrees °C) cooler than inland areas of San Diego County in the summer, and 5 degrees warmer in the winter. The city is mostly or partly sunny 323 days of the year, with the wettest months in winter. As of 2006, the Farmers' Almanac consistently ranked the area within the Top 10 Best Weather Cities in America. Scripps Institution of Oceanography operates a weather reporting station at the middle of the Imperial Beach Pier for sky condition, temperature, humidity, pressure, wind and water temperature data.

Climate data for Imperial Beach, California, 1991–2020 normals, extremes 1945–present
Month	Jan	Feb	Mar	Apr	May	Jun	Jul	Aug	Sep	Oct	Nov	Dec	Year
Record high °F (°C)	86 (30)	93 (34)	86 (30)	86 (30)	85 (29)	90 (32)	92 (33)	92 (33)	96 (36)	98 (37)	99 (37)	87 (31)	99 (37)
Mean daily maximum °F (°C)	67.1 (19.5)	65.4 (18.6)	65.9 (18.8)	66.6 (19.2)	68.1 (20.1)	70.2 (21.2)	73.2 (22.9)	75.2 (24.0)	75.0 (23.9)	73.3 (22.9)	69.9 (21.1)	66.2 (19.0)	69.7 (20.9)
Daily mean °F (°C)	57.2 (14.0)	56.5 (13.6)	58.6 (14.8)	59.6 (15.3)	62.4 (16.9)	65.2 (18.4)	68.5 (20.3)	70.1 (21.2)	68.7 (20.4)	64.8 (18.2)	60.2 (15.7)	56.3 (13.5)	62.3 (16.9)
Mean daily minimum °F (°C)	47.4 (8.6)	47.6 (8.7)	51.3 (10.7)	52.5 (11.4)	56.6 (13.7)	60.2 (15.7)	63.8 (17.7)	65.0 (18.3)	62.4 (16.9)	56.3 (13.5)	50.4 (10.2)	46.3 (7.9)	55.0 (12.8)
Record low °F (°C)	26 (−3)	32 (0)	33 (1)	34 (1)	43 (6)	46 (8)	52 (11)	49 (9)	48 (9)	35 (2)	30 (−1)	30 (−1)	26 (−3)
Average precipitation inches (mm)	1.69 (43)	2.10 (53)	1.85 (47)	0.59 (15)	0.10 (2.5)	0.08 (2.0)	0.33 (8.4)	0.03 (0.76)	0.14 (3.6)	0.42 (11)	0.80 (20)	0.45 (11)	8.58 (217.26)
Source 1: NOAA
Source 2: National Weather Service

=== Environment ===
Imperial Beach marks the terminus of the Tijuana River watershed and is subject to changes that occur upriver. There have been numerous instances of beach closures and pollutant aerosolization within Imperial Beach as caused by untreated sewage or spills. Beaches have been closed since December 8, 2021.

According to Sumya Karamangla, writing in The New York Times (May 26, 2025): "Every day, 50 million gallons of untreated sewage, industrial chemicals and trash flow from Tijuana, Mexico, into southern San Diego County." The problem "has significantly worsened in recent years as the population of Tijuana has exploded and sewage treatment plants in both countries have fallen into disrepair." This has been causing businesses to lose money and negatively affecting inhabitants' health. Mexico is doing a poor job maintaining sewage treatment from the Tijuana River valley. Residents have been pleading for action but fear proposed solutions, which require binational cooperation to implement, will take far too long.

Negotiations have been taking place to accommodate both communities with the sewage crisis. To prove commitment, Mexico has invested 34$ million into a new water treatment plant. This plant can effectively process 800 liters of water per second. The Consulate General of Mexico in San Diego hosted the first meeting between Mexico and the United States delegates to negotiate. Currently the sewage waste has contaminated the air quality. Imperial Beach has taken action and began distributing air purifiers to their community.

== Demographics ==
Historical population
Census	Pop.	Note	%±
1960	17,773		—
1970	20,244		13.9%
1980	22,689		12.1%
1990	26,512		16.8%
2000	26,992		1.8%
2010	26,324		−2.5%
2020	26,137		−0.7%
U.S. Decennial Census; 1860–1870 1880-1890; 1900 1910 1920; 1930 1940 1950; 1960 1970 1980; 1990 2000 2010; 2020

=== Racial and ethnic composition ===
Imperial Beach city, California – Racial and ethnic composition Note: the US Census treats Hispanic/Latino as an ethnic category. This table excludes Latinos from the racial categories and assigns them to a separate category. Hispanics/Latinos may be of any race.
Race / Ethnicity (NH = Non-Hispanic)	Pop 2000	Pop 2010	Pop 2020	% 2000	% 2010	% 2020
White alone (NH)	11,737	9,487	8,712	43.48%	36.04%	33.33%
Black or African American alone (NH)	1,343	1,063	873	4.98%	4.04%	3.34%
Native American or Alaska Native alone (NH)	187	136	97	0.69%	0.52%	0.37%
Asian alone (NH)	1,677	1,624	1,500	6.21%	6.17%	5.74%
Native Hawaiian or Pacific Islander alone (NH)	153	156	118	0.57%	0.59%	0.45%
Other race alone (NH)	45	53	119	0.17%	0.20%	0.46%
Mixed race or Multiracial (NH)	1,032	912	1,349	3.82%	3.46%	5.16%
Hispanic or Latino (any race)	10,818	12,893	13,369	40.08%	48.98%	51.15%
Total	26,992	26,324	26,137	100.00%	100.00%	100.00%

=== 2020 census ===
As of the 2020 census, Imperial Beach had a population of 26,137 and a population density of 6,091.1 inhabitants per square mile (2,351.8/km^{2}). The age distribution was 22.6% under the age of 18, 9.7% aged 18 to 24, 31.7% aged 25 to 44, 23.5% aged 45 to 64, and 12.4% who were 65 years of age or older. The median age was 34.7 years. For every 100 females, there were 100.8 males, and for every 100 females age 18 and over, there were 99.1 males age 18 and over.

The census reported that 99.9% of the population lived in households, 33 people (0.1%) lived in non-institutionalized group quarters, and no one was institutionalized. 100.0% of residents lived in urban areas, while 0.0% lived in rural areas.

There were 9,405 households, out of which 36.3% included children under the age of 18, 41.5% were married-couple households, 8.4% were cohabiting couple households, 28.2% had a female householder with no spouse or partner present, and 21.9% had a male householder with no spouse or partner present. 22.4% of households were one person, and 7.4% had someone living alone who was 65 years of age or older. The average household size was 2.78. There were 6,390 families (67.9% of all households).

There were 10,105 housing units at an average density of 2,354.9 units per square mile (909.2 units/km^{2}). Of these, 9,405 (93.1%) were occupied, 31.7% were owner-occupied, and 68.3% were occupied by renters. The vacancy rate was 6.9%, including a homeowner vacancy rate of 1.4% and a rental vacancy rate of 4.1%.

=== 2023 estimates ===
In 2023, the US Census Bureau estimated that 17.7% of the population were foreign-born. Of all people aged 5 or older, 58.2% spoke only English at home, 37.2% spoke Spanish, 1.0% spoke other Indo-European languages, 3.3% spoke Asian or Pacific Islander languages, and 0.2% spoke other languages. Of those aged 25 or older, 85.3% were high school graduates and 23.7% had a bachelor's degree.

The median household income in 2023 was $79,071, and the per capita income was $38,709. About 8.8% of families and 15.2% of the population were below the poverty line.

== Culture ==
=== Coastal and beach areas ===
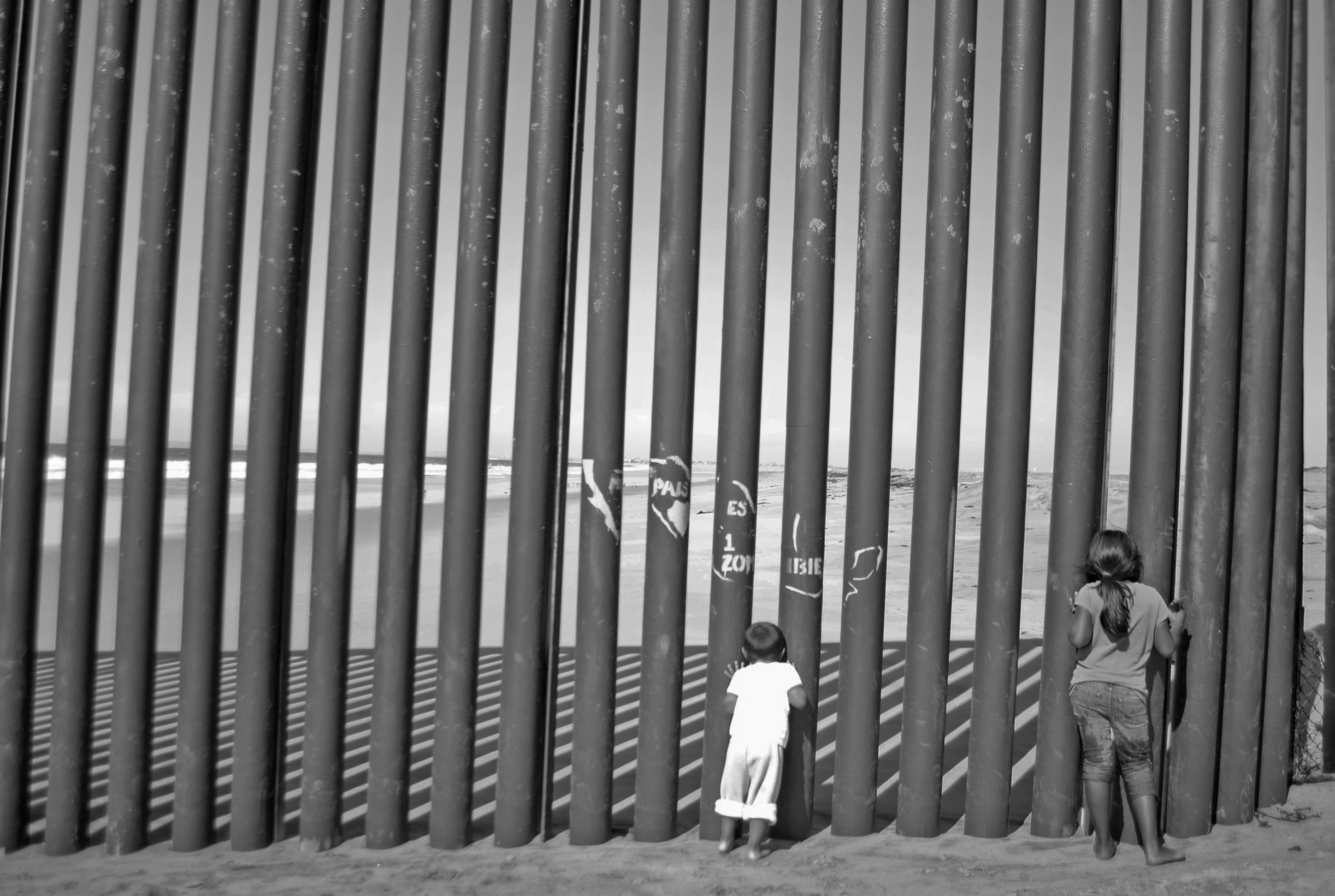
Children looking through the border fence on the Mexican side of Imperial Beach

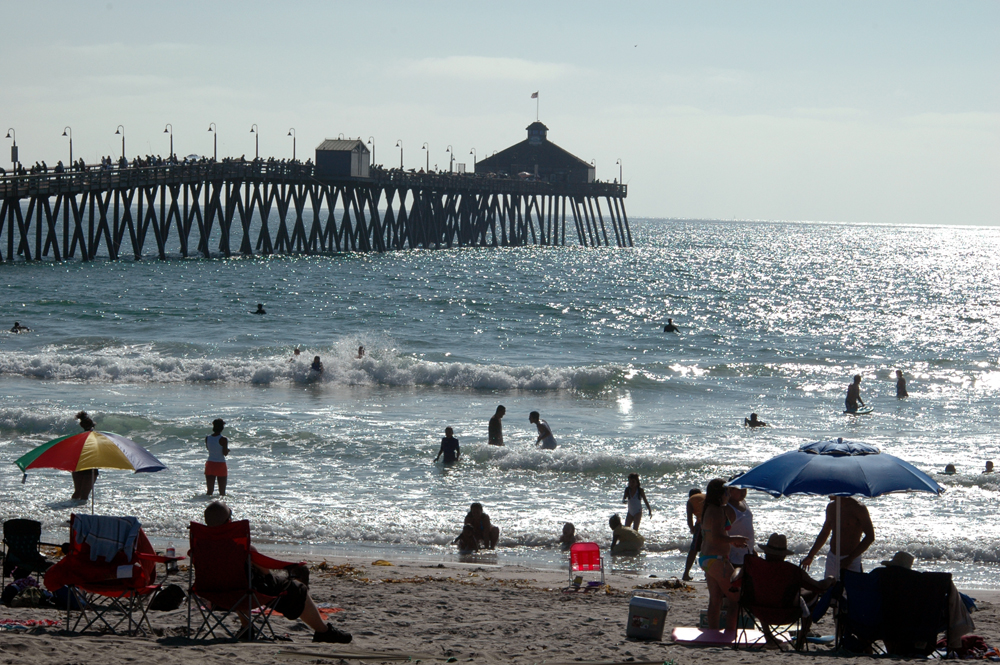
The pier of Imperial Beach

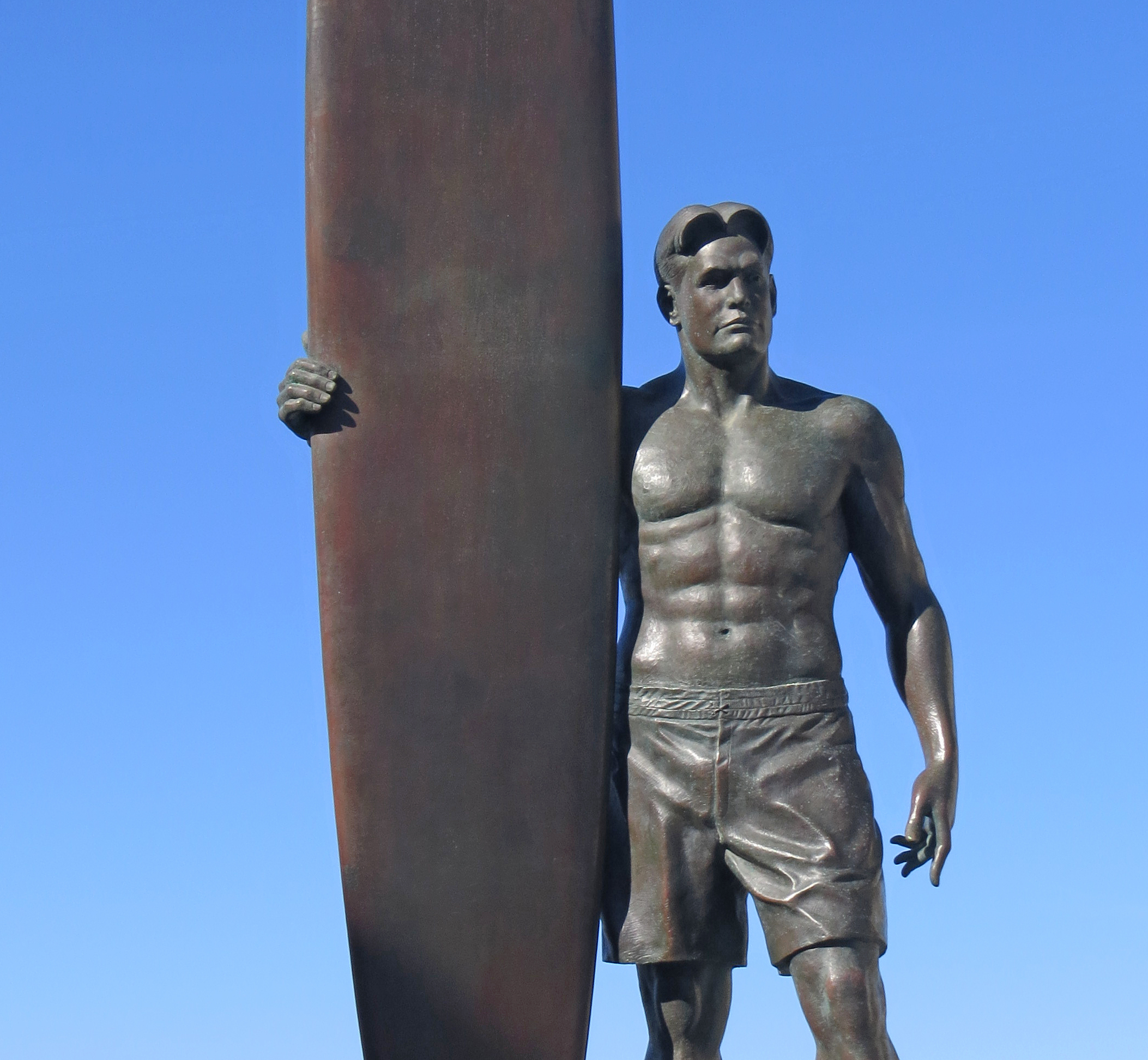
Surfer statue

Imperial Beach includes nearly four miles (6.4 km) of beaches and employs a year-round lifeguard staff. Beach volleyball, surfing and body boarding are popular in Imperial Beach with activities concentrated north and south of the Imperial Beach Pier and the Boca Rio beach break, one of San Diego County's best surf spots. San Diego Magazine identifies the Boca Rio beach break as the second best surfing location in the county, second only to Black's Beach and the Scripps Canyon area near La Jolla. The area around Imperial Beach Pier known as Pier Plaza showcases plaques placed on surfboard benches that tell the story of how the city's big waves influenced surfing from 1937 to the 1950s. Nearby Border Field State Park signifies the southernmost beach on the west coast of the United States and allows beachgoers in America to speak through the fence with beachgoers in Mexico, where the beach is called Playas de Tijuana (Tijuana Beach). The city connects to nearby Coronado, California, by way of the Silver Strand, a narrow, 7-mile-long (11-kilometer) isthmus. Silver Strand State Beach, a popular beach for camping, bird watching, and bicycling, is located in the middle of the isthmus and includes both bay and ocean beaches.

The San Diego County summer tourist season brings many visitors to the city's beaches each year. For 31 years, Imperial Beach played home to the U.S. Open Sandcastle competition, the largest sand castle competition in the United States, drawing in approximately 325,000 people. The city held the final sand castle competition in August 2011, bringing an end to the annual event and tradition. The city also holds the beach front classic car show every summer and an annual dog-surfing contest. The South Bay Drive-in, one of the few remaining drive-in movie theaters in San Diego County, is located just outside Imperial Beach off Coronado Avenue.

Imperial Beach is home to Tijuana River National Estuarine Research Reserve, a National Estuarine Research Reserve, and Border Field State Park. The estuary, located off Seacoast Drive and Imperial Beach Boulevard, is home to many endangered birds and wildlife. This estuary marks the place where the fresh water Tijuana River enters the salt water Pacific Ocean. It is the largest salt water marsh in Southern California.

=== Military presence ===
Imperial Beach has a large military population and is home to the US Navy's Naval Outlying Landing Field Imperial Beach also known as NOLF Imperial Beach. It is bordered on its northern extreme by Silver Strand Training Complex.

=== Crime ===
The San Diego County Sheriff's Department 2008 crime statistics rank Imperial Beach below the national average in all areas reported.

== Government ==
In the California State Legislature, Imperial Beach is in the 18th senatorial district, represented by Democrat Steve Padilla, and in the 80th Assembly district, represented by Democrat David Alvarez.

In the United States House of Representatives, Imperial Beach is in California's 52nd congressional district, represented by Democrat Juan Vargas.

== Transportation ==
The San Diego Metropolitan Transit System (MTS) provides bus and paratransit services to the city from throughout San Diego County.

The city is one of five Port member cities making up the Port of San Diego, one of America's top 30 U.S. container ship ports.

== In popular culture ==
Kem Nunn's novel, Tijuana Straits, provides insight into the culture of the border and surfing in Imperial Beach and the Tijuana River Valley, and the environmental problems that affect residents of Tijuana, Imperial Beach and Coronado.

Portions of the 2005 film Lords of Dogtown were shot in Imperial Beach, including use of the Imperial Beach Pier in exterior establishing shots.

The HBO television series John from Cincinnati was about a dysfunctional surfing family in Imperial Beach set against the backdrop of the U.S.-Mexico border. The series (from Executive Producer David Milch, writer Kem Nunn, and director Mark Tinker) was filmed at a variety of locations in Imperial Beach and in the Tijuana River Valley.

On February 21, 2019, Vice News Tonight on HBO broadcast a segment from Imperial Beach about how an extreme tidal surge, known as king tide, affects the local population living along the Pacific coast.

== Notable people ==
- California Congressman Brian Bilbray grew up in Imperial Beach. Bilbray graduated from Mar Vista High School in 1970.
- Billy Lee Chadd, serial killer who lived in Imperial Beach during most of his crimes.
- Aaron Chang, award-winning American photographer specializing in surfing and ocean photography for Surfing Magazine
- Serge Dedina is the director of environmental organization Wildcoast. He was the mayor of Imperial Beach.
- Allen "Dempsey" Holder, was a pioneering surfer in the San Diego, California South County area. He is noted for riding the large surf of the Tijuana Sloughs and he headed up the Imperial Beach lifeguard services for many years. The local public safety/lifeguard facility is named in his honor.
- Software entrepreneur Charlie Jackson grew up in Imperial Beach and graduated Mar Vista High in 1967.
- Actor and screenwriter Jordan Jacobo lives in Imperial Beach.
- Eleanor Mariano, retired USN Rear Admiral and physician to the President of the United States at the White House for 9 years.
- Marco Minnemann, drummer
- Film actor Matthew Modine attended high school in Imperial Beach.
- Travis Ryan, vocalist of Deathgrind band Cattle Decapitation and Grindcore band Murder Construct.

== See also ==
- List of beaches in San Diego County
- List of California state parks

To the North: Silver Strand (San Diego)	California State Beaches	To the South; Border Field State Park
