= Coastal Riverine Force =

Unit of the United States Navy

The Coastal Riverine Force (CORIVFOR) was a unit of the United States Navy within the organizational structure of the Navy's Navy Expeditionary Combat Command (NECC). The Coastal Riverine Force (CRF) was established following the merger of Riverine Group 1 and Naval Coastal Warfare Groups 1 and 2 on June 1, 2012. Its express purpose was littoral warfare, naval boarding (VBSS), offshore protection for maritime infrastructure and Military Sealift Command ships operating in coastal waterways, ports and harbor security, and riverine warfare.

The Coastal Riverine Force (CRF) operates in harbors, rivers, bays, across the littorals and ashore. The primary mission of the CRF is to conduct maritime security operations across all phases of military operations by defending high value assets, critical maritime infrastructure, ports and harbors both inland and on coastal waterways against enemies and when commanded conduct offensive combat operations. In support of Navy Fleet operations, the CRF is able to operate in the green water to shore areas in conjunction with Amphibious Readiness Groups, Expeditionary Strike Groups, Carrier Strike Groups, Global Partnership Stations, and Military Sealift Command ships. In addition to afloat security, CRF units also operate ashore in support of ground operations, protection of critical maritime infrastructure, and Theater Security Cooperation missions. The CRF is composed of units manned, trained, and equipped to conduct, port and harbor security, high-value unit security and escort, surveillance and reconnaissance, insertion and extraction of small units, and command and control for supporting and assigned units. The CRF is capable of conducting 24 hour operations in all weather conditions and climates. The CRF has both the Active and Reserve Components trained to operate in ambiguous anti-terrorism and force protection threat environments. These units employ both non-lethal and lethal escalation of force measures in order to provide a layer of force protection. CRFs may also be task-organized to provide tailored force packages to meet unique operational requirements and contingencies such as force protection, protection of vital waterways, establishment of local military superiority in areas of naval operations and Humanitarian Assistance and Disaster Relief.

The US Navy disbanded the Coastal Riverine Force in 2020 creating the Maritime Expeditionary Security Force to focus on expeditionary coastal warfare and security operations but dropping the riverine forces.

== Groups ==
- The CRF consists of two headquarters staffs, Coastal Riverine Group (CORIVGRU) 1 in San Diego (Navy Outlying Landing Field, Imperial Beach) and CORIVGRU 2 in Virginia Beach (Joint Expeditionary Base Little Creek – Fort Story). CORIVGRU's primary mission is to man, train, and equip subordinate forces for tasking as assigned in the required operational capability and projected operating environment.
- Coastal Riverine Group One (CORIVGRU 1), homeported in Imperial Beach, California, with squadrons at Naval Air Station North Island (CORIVRON 1) and Naval Weapons Station Seal Beach (NWS Seal Beach) (CORIVRON 11); Imperial Beach, California (CORIVRON 3); and Coastal Riverine Group Detachment Guam (CRG-1 DET Guam) in Guam. Only the elite of the CORIVGRU sailors will be deployed to CRGDET units.
- Coastal Riverine Group Two (CORIVGRU 2), homeported on Joint Expeditionary Base Little Creek-Fort Story (JEBLC-FS) in Virginia Beach, Virginia, with squadrons located at Joint Expeditionary Base Little Creek-Fort Story (JEBLC-FS), a forward deployed detachment in Bahrain, and reserve squadrons in Norfolk Naval Shipyard, Newport, Rhode Island and Jacksonville, Florida.
- The Coastal Riverine Squadron (CORIVRON) is responsible for maintaining unit-level readiness of its assigned companies to include the requirement to train individuals to deploy in support of mission tasking. There are two Active Component (AC) squadrons (CRS 2 and 4), and two Reserve Component (RC) squadrons (CORIVRON 8 and 10) assigned to the East Coast and one AC squadron (CORIVRON 3) and two RC squadrons (CORIVRON 1 and 11) assigned to the West Coast.
- The Coastal Riverine Company (CRC) is the standard unit of action for the CRF. Companies are deployable self-sustaining units that may operate independently or in coordination with other forces. Each company has two platoons with personnel assigned for boat operations, a security team capable of conducting VBSS missions, and an Intelligence Surveillance Recon (ISR) team capable of operating unmanned vehicles and squadron-level communications equipment. Each company is equipped with four green-water capable patrol boats and four riverine/harbor security boats.
- Each platoon provides one boat crew per boat assigned, a 12-person security team trained and equipped to conduct Level I and Level II boardings, and an ISR team to act as an integrated tactical operations center. Platoons may be divided into smaller units such as embarked security teams to support military sealift transits, aircraft security missions, or other missions as directed.

== History ==
The modern naval coastal warfare community was created in the early 2000s due to the bombing of the USS Cole and was under the Maritime Force Protection Command as Naval Coastal Warfare Groups. The Navy created the Navy Expeditionary Combat Command placing Naval Coastal Warfare Groups under it in 2006, also in 2006 the Navy stood up a Riverine Group. In 2012 the Navy merged Naval Coastal Warfare Groups and the Navy Riverine Group calling them the Coastal Riverine Force (CRF). In 2020 NCW underwent a major overhaul and transitioned units to the Maritime Expeditionary Security Force (MESF) as the Navy had dropped riverine operations, turning that mission over to the US Marine Corps.

The US Navy has completed port, waterway and coastal security (PWCS) since the start of the US Navy. The Yangtze River Patrol Force patrolled the Yangtze River in China from the mid-1850s to World War two in river gun boats. During the Civil War Union Navy river gun boats fought for control of the Mississippi.

Patrol Boat teams fought in coastal areas during World War II. Motor Torpedo Boat Squadron Three rescued General Douglas MacArthur (and later the Filipino president Manuel L. Quezon) from the Philippines after the Japanese invasion and then participated in guerilla actions until American resistance ended with the fall of Corregidor. PT boats subsequently participated in most of the campaigns in the Southwest Pacific by conducting and supporting joint/combined reconnaissance, blockade, sabotage, and raiding missions as well as attacking Japanese shore facilities, shipping, and combatants. PT boats were used in the European Theater beginning in April 1944 to support the Office of Strategic Services in the insertion of espionage and French Resistance personnel and for amphibious landing deception.

The development of a robust riverine warfare capability during the Vietnam War produced the forerunner of the modern special warfare combatant-craft crewman. In 1966 River Patrol Force (Task Force 116) operated River Patrol Boats (PBR) conducting counterinsurgency operations in the Mekong Delta region of Vietnam. A SEAL Platoon was assigned to each of the five River Squadrons inserted and extracted from their patrol area by PBRs. Game Warden forces lost 200 Sailors in the boats from its inception to its discontinuation, however Task Force 116's kill ratio (approximately 40 enemy KIA to every 1 American KIA) was one of the highest of U.S. forces during the Vietnam War. In total, two sailors of Task Force 116 were awarded the Medal of Honor: Petty Officer First Class James Williams and Seaman David George Ouettet. Nevertheless, the VC did not cease operations in the Mekong Delta but instead began focusing on disrupting traffic on the rivers and ultimately redirected their sampans and other watercraft to smaller rivers and canals to avoid combat with the more powerful PBRs.

== Personnel and equipment ==
As of October 2012, the unit had 113 boats, ranging from rubber combat raiding craft to 53-foot command boats. It also had 2,657 active and 2,507 reserve personnel.
