= José Figueroa (disambiguation) =

José Figueroa may refer to:

== Sports ==
- José Manuel Figueroa (weightlifter) (born 1939), Puerto Rican weightlifter
- José Figueroa (footballer) (born 1958), Honduran footballer
- José Figueroa (judoka) (born 1970), Puerto Rican judoka
- Jose Ricardo Figueroa (born 1991), Cuban modern pentathlete
- Tito Figueroa (José Antonio Figueroa, born 1914), Puerto Rican baseball player
- José Figueroa (sprinter) (born 2004), Puerto Rican athlete

== Others ==
- José Figueroa (1792–1835), Mexican general and territorial governor of Alta California
- José Angel Figueroa (born 1946), Puerto Rican poet
- José Rubén Figueroa Smutny (born 1967), Mexican politician
- José Manuel Figueroa (born 1975), American musician
- José Figueroa, surviving passenger of Avianca Flight 052 in 1990

== Other uses ==
- Jose Figueroa deportation case
