= Border Angels =

U.S. nonprofit organization

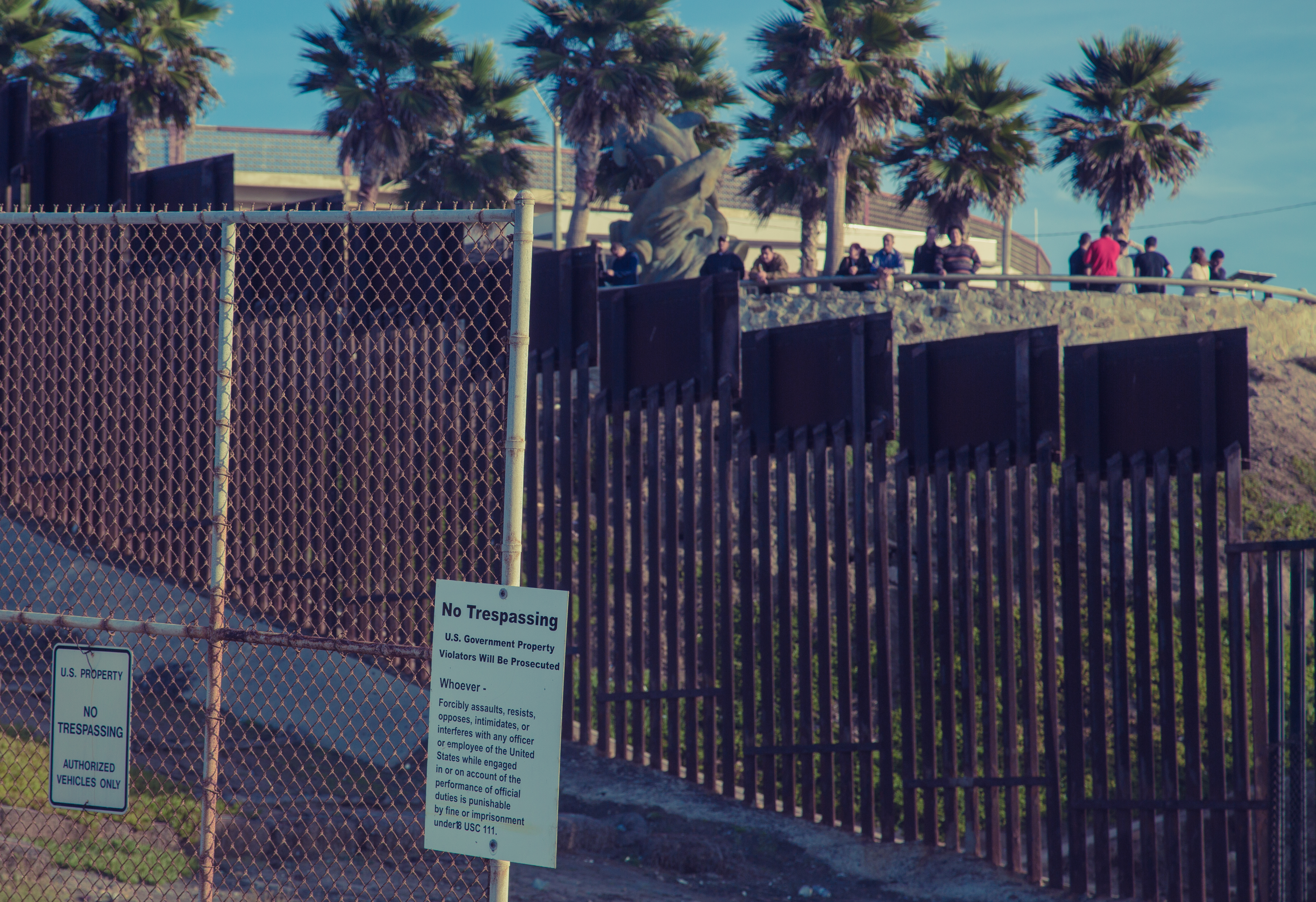
- Founded: 1986 by Enrique Morones in San Diego, California
- Type: Non-profit; NGO; Faith Based
- Headquarters: San Diego, California
- Location: San Diego
- Services: Protecting Migrant Rights
- Fields: Legal advocacy, Media attention, direct-appeal campaigns, research, lobbying
- Founder & Director: Enrique Morones
- Website: www.borderangels.org

Border Angels (also known as Angeles De La Frontera) is a San Diego–based 501(c)(3) tax-exempt nonprofit charitable organization that is focused on migrant rights, immigration reform, and the prevention of immigrant deaths along the border. Border Angels, along with its more than 2000 volunteers serves San Diego County's immigrant population through various migrant outreach programs such as day laborer outreach and legal assistance, and provides life-saving assistance for migrants by placing bottled water in remote mountain and desert border regions of the San Diego and Imperial counties, California.

== History ==
Border Angels was begun in 1986 by founder and director Enrique Morones (grandson of Luis N. Morones) initially to provide humanitarian assistance to migrants living in the canyons of San Diego's North County region. The group's focus later expanded to humanitarian efforts aimed at saving the lives of migrants by depositing bottled water at remote spots in the desert and mountains along the U.S.–Mexico border where migrants are known to travel on foot. Morones has said the "spark" that started the Border Angels work was a trip he took with members of a Catholic Church parish in Carlsbad to canyons in northern San Diego County where children, women and families were living in difficult conditions. (source: Border Angels Annual Awards Dinner Celebration program publication, 11-1-2015). He continued visits bringing water, food and other supplies to the canyon residents. After living in Los Angeles for several years, in 1993 Morones met and discussed his work with Ethel Kennedy, widow of Sen. Robert F. Kennedy and a campaigner for human rights, who encouraged him to expand the work and to use the media to draw attention to the struggles of migrants and the need for humanitarian assistance. Since that meeting, Border Angels has grown to provide human services throughout the US-Mexico border region, collaborating with hundreds of universities and human rights groups, as well as partnering with multiple shelters and community organizations on both sides of the US–Mexico border.

Morones' inspirational talk with Mrs. Kennedy came during an encounter at a dinner in remembrance of César Chávez, the late labor leader, civil rights activist, and farm worker. "Ethel Kennedy told me, 'You have to let people know so they can help you,'" Morones said.

On the occasion of the group's 25th anniversary, Morones elaborated on that meeting with Mrs. Kennedy: "At an event we organized in Los Angeles after the Rodney King disturbances of 1993, Ethel Kennedy, wife of the assassinated politician Robert Kennedy, spoke to me about the importance of the media in raising consciousness, and that's when I decided to become a full-time activist and take on a more visible leadership role.''

Among its other activities, Border Angels supports and maintains a pauper's cemetery in Holtville, California, in the Imperial Valley, where hundreds of migrants who died crossing the border are buried. Many of the graves are without names, marked only with a simple stone or brick. The group places crosses by graves inscribed with words in Spanish that translate as: "Never Forgotten" and "You Are Not Alone". Morones has stated that his Catholic faith, education and upbringing inform, shape and motivate his work. He sometimes wears a shirt bearing the image of Jesus Christ with the words, "Who would Jesus deport?" He told the San Diego Union-Tribune in 2011: "All of my work and life is based on my faith—that only love overcomes hate and light overcomes darkness,'' Morones said. "My faith in God is the light that guides my life.''

Border Angels helps provide job skills, such as hair, skin and beauty care, to women recently deported from the United States to Mexico. In April 2016, 20 deported women graduated from a hair stylist course supported by Border Angels at the Desayunador Salesiano "Padre Chava" food hall for indigents in Tijuana, B.C., Mexico.

In his autobiography, Morones writes that Border Angels "came into existence in 1986, but did not have a name until 2001," when the name was coined by Univision TV host Don Francisco. [Source: Morones, Enrique (2012). The Power of One: The Story of the Border Angels. San Diego State University Press. p. 46.] During an interview with Morones on his TV show Sabado Gigante, Francisco called him a "border angel", which led Morones to adopt the name for his organization.

Over the years, Border Angels has provided a public counterpoint to various Minutemen and other border vigilante groups that have protested against immigration along the border and against the hiring of undocumented workers. Morones has accused the Minutemen and other groups of racism.

In early 2016, Border Angels was able to help identify and locate the family of a young man who spent 16 years living on life support in nursing care, unconscious and with an unknown identity following a 1999 automobile crash near the border. Morones worked with representatives from the Border Patrol agents' union, state legislators, the University of California, San Diego and the Mexican consulate. As a result of those efforts, the Mexican consulate in San Diego reported that the man's identity was confirmed as a result of a DNA test, and that the family requested his name not be revealed.

Morones is the founder of San Diego's House of Mexico, composed of individuals and community partners who seek to foster an awareness, appreciation, and understanding of Mexico by utilizing a goodwill ambassador approach with a message of inclusion.

== Operation Gatekeeper ==
Operation Gatekeeper was a 1994 federal government crackdown on unauthorized border crossing by migrants. Morones has said the program, which fortified border fences and established militarized areas along some sections of the U.S.-Mexico border, is responsible for hundreds of deaths of migrants who tried to enter the United States through difficult terrain, often perishing in extreme weather conditions. Gatekeeper has forced border crossers to move to more dangerous terrain, resulting in increased deaths. "They are forced to cross in harsher areas," Morones said. "It's inhumane."

When Gatekeeper was begun under the Clinton administration, 14 miles of corrugated-steel panels were welded into sections of fence dividing the United States and Mexico between the Pacific Ocean and Otay Mesa, and additional bollard fencing, which consists of thick poles placed inches apart, and a high steel fence. Bright lights were erected and motion-detection sensors were placed in the ground so Border Patrol officers could monitor and detect unauthorized border crossings. The number of Border Patrol agents was increased dramatically between 1994 and 1998.

More than 10,000 people are believed to have died trying to cross the border from Mexico into the United States since Gatekeeper began in 1994.

== 2006 Immigrant Spring and the Marcha Migrante ==
Every year Border Angels holds what it calls Marcha Migrantes, which are caravans of people who travel across the country meeting with local community groups to support them in their struggles and to educate people about migrant deaths, the need for immigration reform and Border Angels' life-saving work. [Source: Morones, Enrique (2012). The Power of One: The Story of the Border Angels. San Diego State University Press. pp. 33, 56.]

=== Marcha Migrante I ===
2006 – The journey began February 2, 2006, during the 2006 United States immigration reform protests. A caravan of 25 cars first went to Holtville, California, to the cemetery where many who died crossing the border are buried in simple, often unmarked graves. Next, Dolores Huerta, co-founder of the United Farm Workers, arranged a meeting at the Placita Olvera in Los Angeles. Efforts focused on opposition to Border Protection, Anti-terrorism, and Illegal Immigration Control Act of 2005, which passed the U.S. House of Representatives in December 2005 and would have made it a federal crime to assist people in the country without documentation. Border Angels and other Latino groups organized massive marches in cities around the country in opposition, and the Catholic Church in Los Angeles issued a statement opposing the bill. It did not pass the U.S. Senate. The group drove on to Washington, D.C., and back to San Diego, holding meetings in 40 cities in 27 days. [Source: Morones, Enrique (2012). The Power of One: The Story of the Border Angels. San Diego State University Press. pp. 44–60.]

=== Marcha Migrante II ===
2007 – The two-week journey began February 2. The caravan traveled along the entire U.S.–Mexico border from San Diego to Brownsville, Texas, and back.

=== Marcha Migrante III: Tu voto es tu voz ===
2008 – The journey in February 2008 went to the Canada–United States border, starting at Friendship Park and passing through six western states with the message, "Tu voto es tu voz," or Your vote is your voice. [Source: Morones, Enrique (2012). The Power of One: The Story of the Border Angels. San Diego State University Press. pp. 92–93.]

=== Marcha Migrante IV: We marched, we voted, now it's time to deliver ===
2009 – The group traveled from San Diego to Florida and then to Washington, D.C., where they met with human rights organizations on immigration reform.

=== Marcha Migrante V: American Dream or American Nightmare ===
2010 – The journey began February 2, 2010, in Sasabe, Sonora, Mexico, and continued by caravan through Tucson, Phoenix, and Yuma, as well as Coachella and Calexico. The journey ended in Holtville, California.

=== Marcha Migrante VI: Trail of Tears ===
2011 – The journey began February 2 in Friendship Park with a press conference and vigil, and the next day headed to Tecate, Mexico, for migrant outreach and water drops in the desert on the U.S. side. After a stop in Holtville, California, the group walked 20 miles into Calexico and concluded with a 13-mile walk through the desert.

The sixth annual Marcha Migrante was called the "Trail of Tears" because it covered territory where migrants have perished. The march, February 2–7 began at Tijuana's Monumento de la Playa, at the Pacific Ocean, and ended at Mexicali's Hotel Migrante, a shelter for people deported from the U.S. The journey traveled through roads and trails on both sides of the border. Micaela Saucedo, who participated in numerous annual marches, said: "We do this to make people aware that we really need immigration reform in both countries and we don't want more deaths on the border."

=== Marcha Migrante VII: Walking with Cesar ===
2012 – The march began at Cesar Chavez Park in San Diego and was in commemoration of the principles of the legendary farm workers' leader. The activists traveled from Holtville, California, to Yuma, Arizona, Los Angeles, Bakersfield, Stockton, Modesto and Sacramento.

=== Marcha Migrante X: All Lives Matter ===
2015 – The group began at Friendship Park and then spent the week in Tijuana visiting migrant shelters and non-governmental organizations working with migrants and the deported.

== 2014 Murietta immigration protests and resettlement of Central American children ==
Border Angels was active during the 2014 American immigration crisis, which produced a surge in unaccompanied children from Central America seeking entrance to the United States.

Border Angels distributed more than 45 tons of donated toys, books, food, and clothing for the migrants, and its volunteers provided a counterpoint to anti-immigration protesters who demonstrated and tried to block the arrival of busloads of migrants arriving for processing in Murietta, California, in Riverside County.

On July 4, 2014, Morones and Border Angels volunteers witnessed as anti-immigration protesters assembled at the U.S. Border Patrol station in Murrieta and physically blocked a bus attempting to drop off immigrants from Central America. Members of the Murrieta police force were among those who initially blocked the bus' entry path, and Morones witnessed about 25 anti-immigrant protesters banging their flags against the bus while shouting at the immigrants inside. Morones called the display, "the worst of the American spirit," and added that "most of the country isn't like that."

The undocumented immigrants were flown to California from Texas in an attempt to relieve overcrowded conditions in U.S. Customs and Border Protection housing from an influx of unaccompanied minors. The situation was described as a "humanitarian crisis" by the Obama administration.

== Children's Day (Día del Niño) ==
Between 2012 and 2016 Border Angels has been involved in the annual binational Children's Day event that has involved the opening of the emergency gate on the border at Friendship Park between Border State Park on the United States side and Friendship Park (San Diego–Tijuana) in Playas de Tijuana. Working alongside United States Border Patrol, mixed status families often including children on the US side who hold Deferred Action for Childhood Arrivals were given the opportunity to briefly hug their families between both countries for a period of three minutes.

=== 2013 ===
The emergency door was opened for the first time after negotiations between Border Patrol and Enrique Morones. This however caused issues when a young girl crossed the border and jumped into the arms of her father, resulting in the event being postponed in 2014.

=== 2015 ===
The door was once again opened in 2015, where four families were given the opportunity to briefly hug.

=== 2016: Opening the Door of Hope ===
The 2016 event was organised as a joint event between United States Border Patrol Agent Frank Alvarado and Border Angels. After speeches from Enrique Morones, Congressman Juan Vargas and Tijuana Council Member Martha Leticia Castaneda, the Emergency Door was opened for five families to embrace for up to three minutes.

Participants included:

Family #	USA Side	Mexico Side
Family 1	Jannet Vargas & Yvette Castanon	Rosario Flores
Family 2	Gabriela & Leonel Martinez Esparaza	Maria Del Carmen Flores & Susanna Carmen Esparaza Flores
Family 3	Sergio Paredes & Adrian Perez	Sergio Estrada
Family 4	Isela Michel Zavala & Brian Montes	Yudridia Guadalupe Zavala
Family 5	Ruth Angelica Ochoa Munoz	Jaccob Rayas
Family 6	Perla & Samantha Martinez	Maria Granadoz & Salvador Hernandez
Alternate Family	Salvador Martinez	Salvador Martinez Sr

== Timeline ==
- 1986: Enrique Morones starts trips to the canyons of Carlsbad with North County church to provide assistance to migrant families who were living there
- 1996: REENCUENTRO is formed in response to the Rodney King riots to promote the concept that "We are one race, the human race"
- 1998: First trips to the desert to distribute water begin
- 2001: During an episode of Sábado Gigante host Don Francisco refers to Enrique as "el angel de la frontera" - Border Angels gains its official name and 501(c)(3) status
- 2003: Radio talkshow Morones por la Tarde is launched to discuss human rights and migrant outreach. Enrique Morones becomes founder and director of the Border Commission
- 2005: Gente Unida is founded to combat hate groups such as the Minuteman Civil Defense Corps
- 2006: Immigrant Spring and Marcha Migrante I is launched, with 111 vehicles joining a national caravan to protest Border Protection, Anti-terrorism and Illegal Immigration Control Act of 2005 and promote humane immigration reform. Over 27 days the caravan visits 40 cities in 20 states and covers over 10,000 miles.
- 2007: Ten border states join Marcha Migrante II from Friendship Park in San Diego to Hope Park in Brownsville, Texas. Border Angels collects 500 carloads of emergency supplies for victims of the 2007 California wildfires
- 2008: Marcha Migrante III from Friendship Park in San Diego to the Canada–United States border to promote "Tu voto es tu voz" campaign to get minority communities to register and vote in the elections.
- 2009: Marcha Migrante IV "We marched, we vote, now it's time to deliver" from Florida to Washington, D.C., this caravan delivers over 25,000 letters to the White House demanding humane immigration reform. Founder Enrique Morones awarded Mexico National Human Rights Award and Ohtli Award.
- 2010: Marcha Migrante V: "American Dream or American Nightmare". Marchers cross the desert from Mexico to the United States, continue with vigils to remember Luis Ramirez, Esiquiel Hernandez, Marcelo Lucero, and the hundreds of unidentified, but not forgotten migrants buried at Holtville Cemetery. Fifteen tons of food and supplies are also delivered to Mexicali earthquake victims.
- 2011: Marcha Migrante VI: "Trail of Tears" from Friendship Park (on the 40th Anniversary) to Calexico. Marchers mirror on Mexican side in solidarity with migrants that cross the border every day.
- 2012: Marcha Migrante VII: "Walking with Cesar". Publishing of the first book The Power of One, the Border Angels Story by Ricardo Griswold del Castillo as told by Enrique Morones. Caravan for Marcha Migrante VII with Javier Sicilia. Participation in three feature films: Detained in the Desert by Josefina Lopez; Harvest of Empire by Juan Gonzalez and Wendy Thompson, and Border Run featuring actress Sharon Stone.
- 2013: During Children's Day celebrations a father is able to hug his five-year-old daughter in the emergency gate of the border wall at Friendship Park.
- 2014: Central American children and families arrive in the San Diego area during the 2014 American Immigration Crisis. Their arrival in the Murrieta, California, area prompted anti-immigrant protests. Border Angels provided support to the immigrants, distributed more than 50 tons of donated supplies, and placed hundreds of families and children in housing. (Source: Border Angels annual awards dinner celebration program, 11-7-2-15.)
- 2016: Third Children's day celebrations where 5 families are able to hug inside of the emergency gate on the Border wall at Friendship Park.
- 2017: Enrique Morones arranges cross-border wedding for convicted drug smuggler Brian Houston at "Gate of Hope". At the time of the wedding, Houston was awaiting sentencing for smuggling 120 pounds of hard drugs across the border.
- 2019: Enrique Morones was separated from Border Angels after an internal investigation into sexual harassment charges by two young women who worked with the Border Angels as volunteers. He then revived an older, inactive nonprofit, "Gente Unidos", to continue his humanitarian work.

== Outreach activities ==
Volunteers are active in the community and participate in:

- Advocacy for humane immigration reform locally, statewide and nationally.
- Providing outreach and assistance to day laborers in the form of food, water and clothing.
- Providing free legal assistance to migrants in need.

=== Desert water drops ===
Border Angels is best known for engaging in desert water drops, where volunteers venture out into the desert along the US/Mexico border and distribute plastic bottles containing water in areas that are thought to be migrant pathways. These trips are used to educate the public about immigration as well as prevent migrant deaths through dehydration.

=== Day labor outreach ===
Border Angels volunteers and activists frequently visit day labor sites around San Diego county such as Home Depot where migrant workers congregate, and distribute food, water, clothing and advice regarding immigration services, legal rights and offer support.

=== Immigration advice and aAdvocacy ===
Founder Enrique Morones is a regular guest on TV and radio talk shows to discuss immigration and human rights.

=== Education ===
Border Angels founder Enrique Morones is a frequent speaker at high schools and universities around the United States on issues such as migrant rights, migrant deaths, and immigration reform. He has conducted numerous public debates with immigration critics including talk-show hosts Bill O'Reilly and Lou Dobbs, Sheriff Joe Arpaio of Maricopa County, Arizona, and Dan Stein, president of the Federation for American Immigration Reform Washington, D.C., which advocates for reduced levels of immigration. He has appeared as a commentator and interview subject on numerous TV shows including the Today Show, Larry King and Spanish-language media, discussing immigration and migrant issues.

In April 2011 he debated Maricopa County Sheriff Joe Arpaio. Morones urged humane treatment of immigrants regardless of their documentation and federal policy that would allow many of the undocumented to obtain a path to citizenship or resident status. Arpaio urged enforcement of existing laws.

== Criticisms ==
Founder Enrique Morones has received several death threats from those who disagree with Border Angels and its stance on undocumented migrants. Critics argue that Border Angels provides assistance to migrants who break U.S. immigration laws. Border Angels, however, provides only life-saving, humanitarian aid and notifies the U.S. Border Patrol before each desert water drop. It maintains a cordial working relationship with Border Patrol officers, as evidenced by the annual Children's Day celebrations and weekly events held in coordination with the Border Patrol at Border Field State Park, which is maintained by Border Patrol.

While critics complain of "illegal immigration," Morones maintains current U.S. immigration laws make it impossible for most people from Mexico and Central America to enter the United States with documentation through a port of entry. "The biggest myth out there is that these people should 'get in line' and come here legally," Morones said. "There is no line. These people do not qualify for visas. There is no legal way for these people to come into the country." Morones also notes that rather than being a financial burden, immigrants contribute greatly to the U.S. economy through work and taxes.

Morones has spoken of Border Angels' work in numerous debates and appearances on campuses and on television and radio. Dan Stein, president of the Federation for American Immigration Reform Washington, D.C., which advocates for reduced levels of immigration, has called Morones a stubborn extremist. "I do not dislike Morones. I think he is somebody who adds a lot to this issue. He brings force, he brings passion, he brings a strong sense of his own moral virtue," Stein said. But he added: "I see Enrique as more or less a professional advocate who isn't deferential to alternative points of view and doesn't approach the issue with respect for those who might oppose his point of view. ... He makes it clear he is morally superior to those who don't agree with him."

== Support ==
Border Angels has drawn support from public figures engaged in the immigration debate. Los Angeles City Councilman and former California Assemblyman Gil Cedillo and playwright Josefina López are among those who have voiced strong support.

"I have a special connection to the Border Angels, who are helping immigrants. We are in this together and support each other in our efforts," said Cedillo, a Democrat who successfully sponsored legislation permitting undocumented immigrants to apply for college aid and was honored by the group in 2011. In 2006, Cedillo said of Morones and Border Angels: "He's the moral authority of our community. Thousands are dying, and he's the only one who links us all together."

David Shirk, director of the Trans-Border Institute at the University of San Diego, said Border Angels is "a pretty consistent voice on the issue of dangers facing migrants coming into the United States as a result of hyper-securitized border policies. I think they play a very critical role in doing things that academics can't and shouldn't do, which is to take strong policy positions and lobby the U.S. government for policy change."

Paul F. Chavez, president of the Cesar Chavez Foundation and son of the late farmworkers' leader, said: "Today, courageous members of Border Angeles are honoring the legacy of my father by making a powerful statement against inhumanity and oppression endured on our border by innocent immigrants. [Source: Morones, Enrique (2012). The Power of One: The Story of the Border Angels. San Diego State University Press. p. 7.]

== See also ==
- No More Deaths
- Humane Borders
