= Friendship Park (San Diego–Tijuana) =

Public park on the US-Mexico border

Coordinates: 32.534576°N 117.122353°W

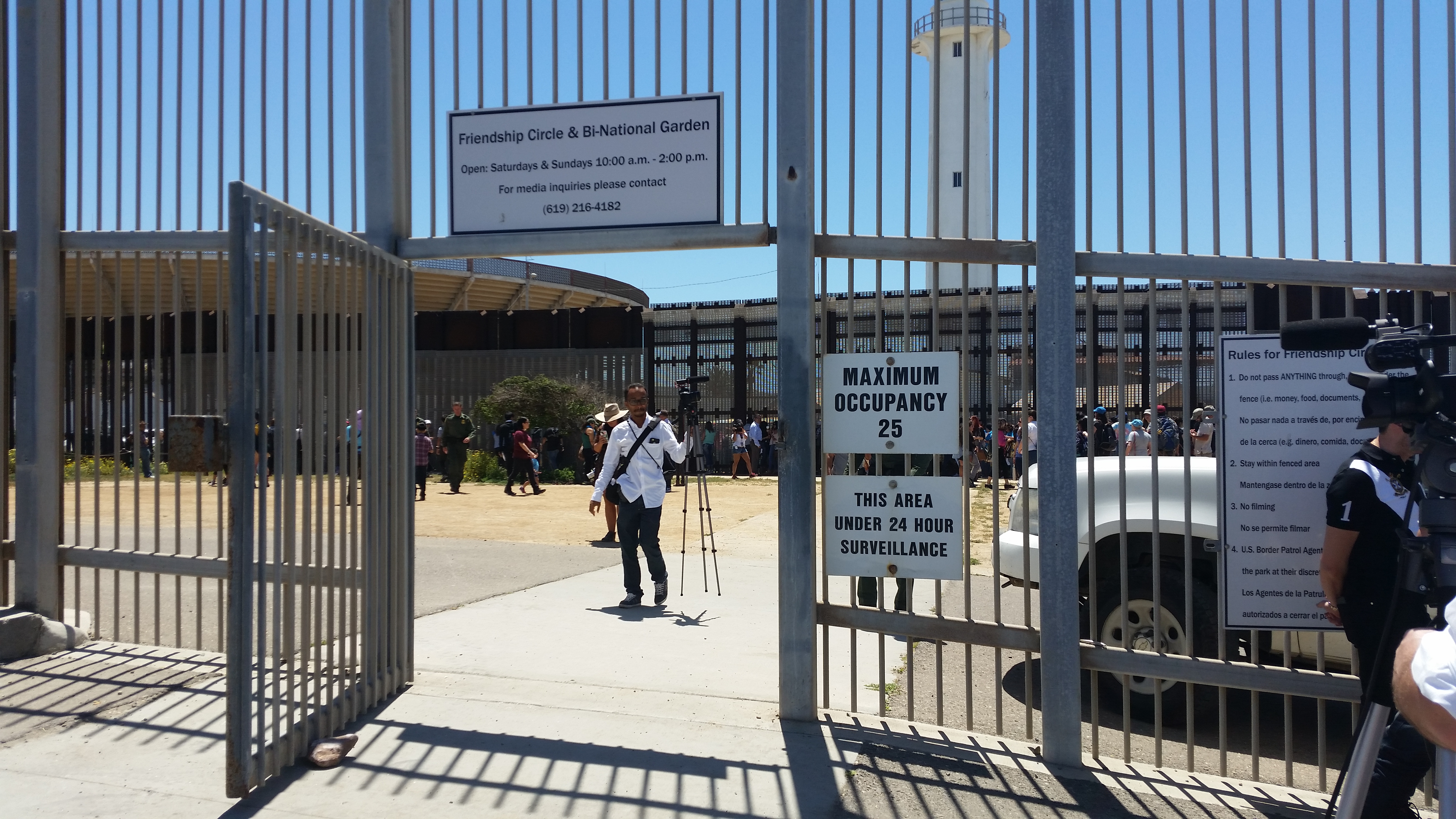
Old entrance to the park through the second fence in the 2010s. In the 2020s the pandemic and fence reconstruction project have left the park closed

Friendship Park is a binational park located along the Mexico–United States border in the San Diego–Tijuana region. Located within the larger Border Field State Park in California's San Diego County, the half-acre (0.20 ha) park includes the border fence dividing the two countries, where residents of both countries can meet in person. The park is the only place along the border that is operated by the US and Mexico as a meeting area.

To the south is Playas de Tijuana, Baja California, Mexico, and to the north is the Tijuana River Estuary and Imperial Beach, California, United States; the west side opens to the beach and the Pacific Ocean. On the U.S. side, the park used to be part of the Monument Mesa picnic area but is now wholly located on federal property under the Department of Homeland Security and is heavily monitored by the U.S. Border Patrol 24 hours a day.

== History ==
The park was inaugurated in 1971 by Pat Nixon (the then first lady of the United States), and originally people from both nations celebrated the concept and it became a community hub for bi-national activities. In the 1990s and 2000s the casual nature of the border deteriorated, and the park became more tightly controlled fenced in area where people enter the park under supervision. It remained an important binational meetup area, the only one along the entire border. By the 2010s it was open for short times and limited to finger touches through a mesh fence, but it was possible to have face-to-face conversations through the fence. In the late 2010s and 2020s, access was further restricted due to the COVID-19 pandemic and construction work.

It was home to binational garden for many years, but this was lost during the wall renovation in the early 2020s. Periodic security and maintenance issues have led to park closures, and the park is currently closed while the renovation work is completed.

In 2022, the U.S. approved the construction of replacement walls, but announced soon after plans for the construction had been put on hold. In January 2023, it was announced that construction would proceed and much of the work was completed by 2024, but it has not reopened yet.

== History ==
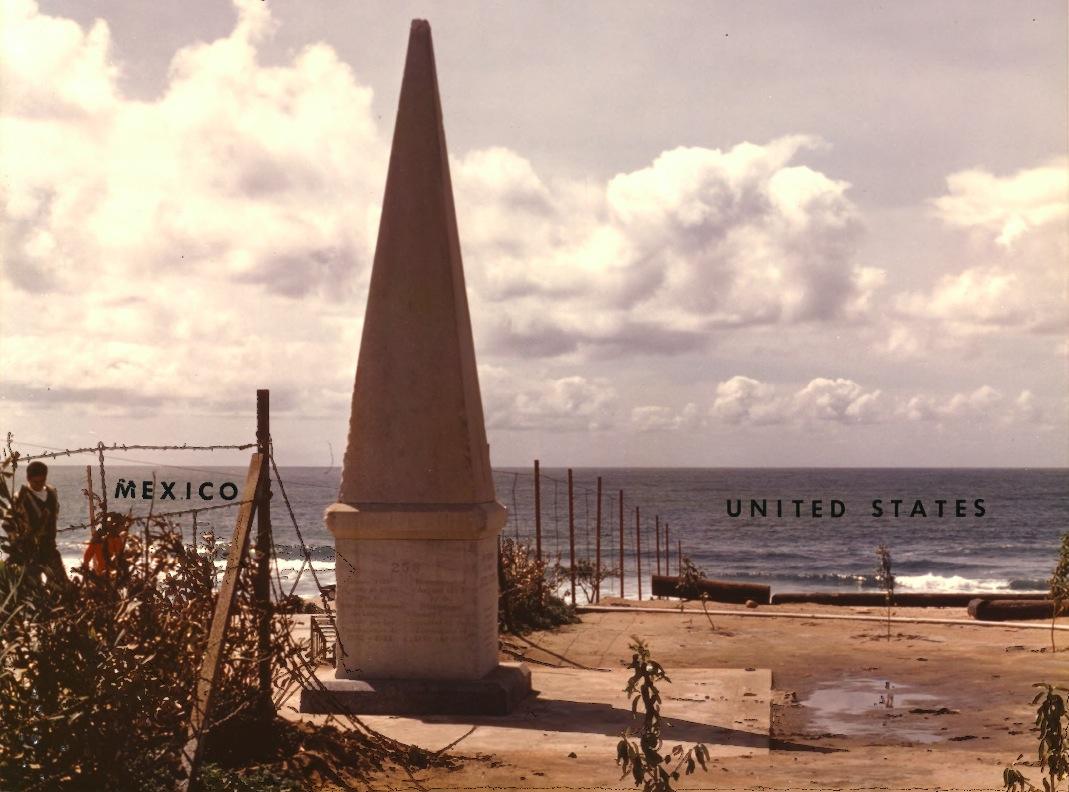
Friendship Park in 1974 near the border marker

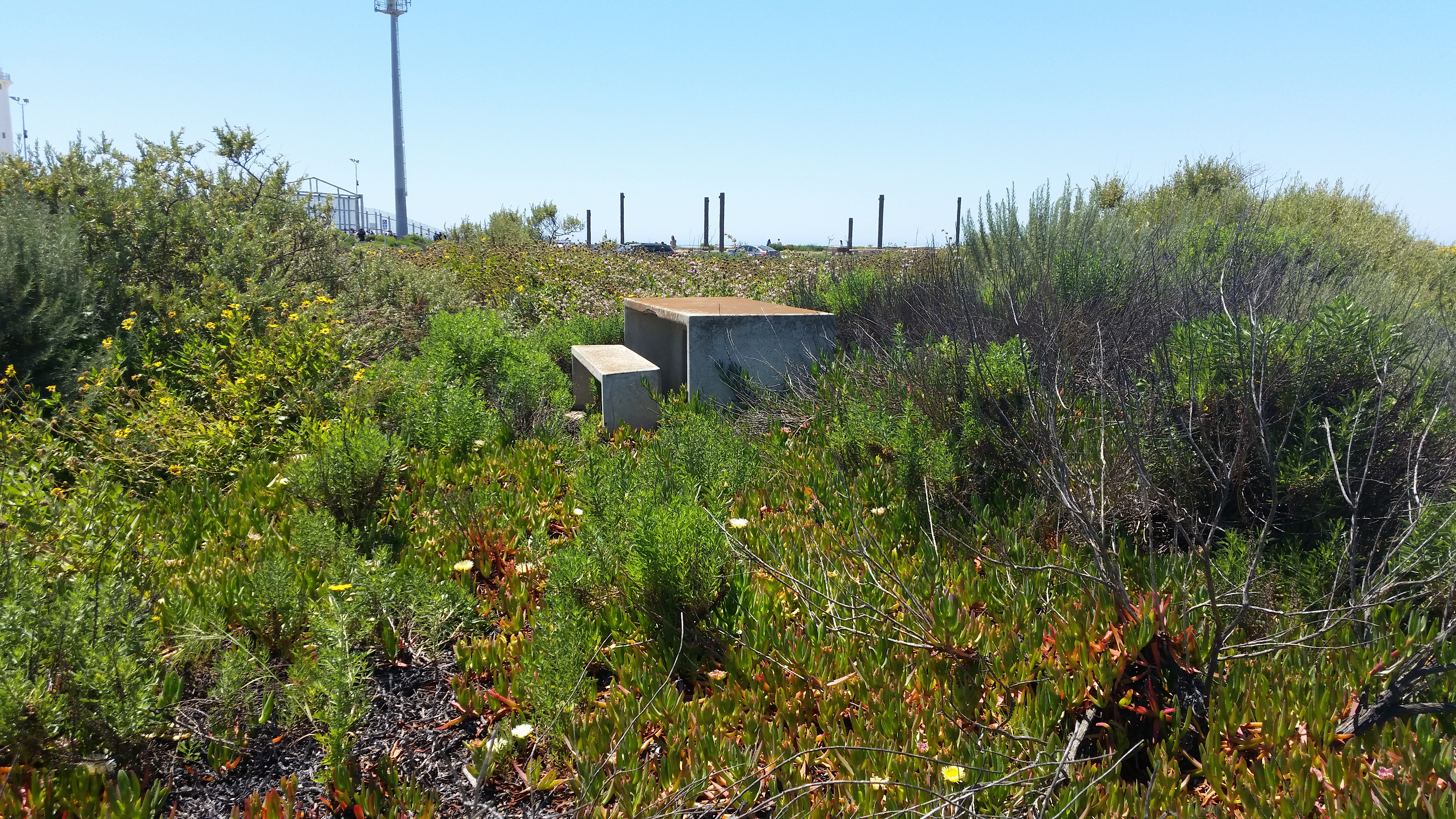
A table and bench, surrounded by plants which grew unchecked from the bi-national plant garden in the park, 2017

In the 1850s, in the aftermath of the Mexican–American War, a joint commission from the United States and Mexico erected a pyramidal statue on a beachside bluff south of what is today Imperial Beach, California to mark the initial boundary point between Mexico and the United States.

Inauguration

On August 18, 1971, the surrounding area in the United States was inaugurated as a California State Park by First Lady Pat Nixon. Celebrating the first phase of what was envisioned as "International Friendship Park," Mrs. Nixon declared, "I hope there won't be a fence too long here."

For the inauguration of the park, Nixon had the wire fence removed and people from both sides could hang out and they greeted each other and exchanged autographs.

For decades friendship park was the epicenter of binational friendships and community, with a retrospective article in the Colombia Political Review noting, "In its early decades, the spirit of community was omnipresent. Families from both sides of the border filled Friendship Park, picnicking, surfing, and enjoying the park’s ocean views. Visitors from Mexico would venture to Imperial Beach, San Diego, for soccer matches, and beachgoers would wander from San Diego to Playas de Tijuana for tacos."

Until 1994, there was only a simple barbed wire fence, and Americans and Mexicans could meet on the border under the supervision of the U.S. Border Patrol. Various social events have taken place in this park, including yoga classes, religious services, weddings, dances and baptisms.

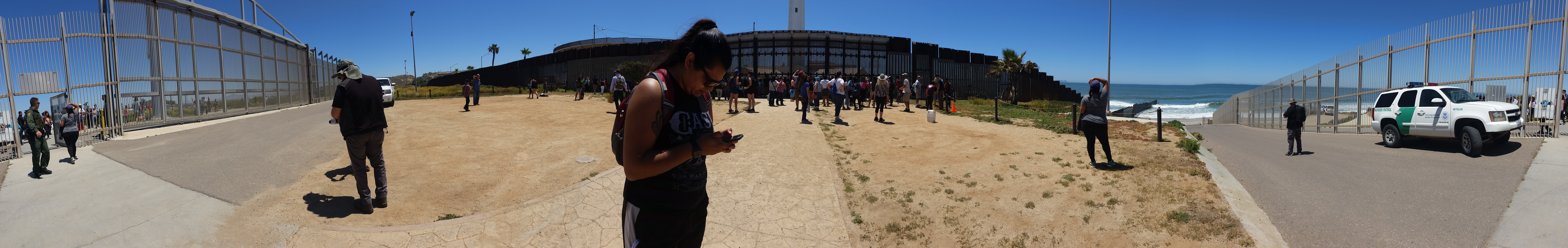
Panorama from within Friendship Park while open bounded by the Mexico–United States barrier, 2017

Operation Gatekeeper wall

In 1994, amidst widespread fear of illegal immigration in the area, a 14-mile fence (23 km) was constructed on the border between San Diego and Tijuana as part of Operation Gatekeeper, including one in Friendship Park. Border security was tightened in the 1990s and again after the September 11 terrorism attacks in 2001. During that time, people on opposite sides of the border were still able to touch and pass objects through the barrier.

In 2009, the U.S. Department of Homeland Security closed down Friendship Park and a second parallel fence was created which stretches into the Pacific Ocean that includes barbed wires, sensors, and surveillance cameras. A 20-foot wide (6.1 m) border patrol access road was also created, along with a third 20-foot wall (6.1 m) of steel bars. In late 2011 and early 2012, the "Surf Fence" Project replaced the old bars that form a barrier on the beach and extended it 300 feet (91 m) into the ocean.

In 2011, mesh was added to the wall, limiting contact to finger tip touches. The fence dividing the two countries had a thick, dense steel mesh that is difficult to see through and only allowed the touching of fingertips.

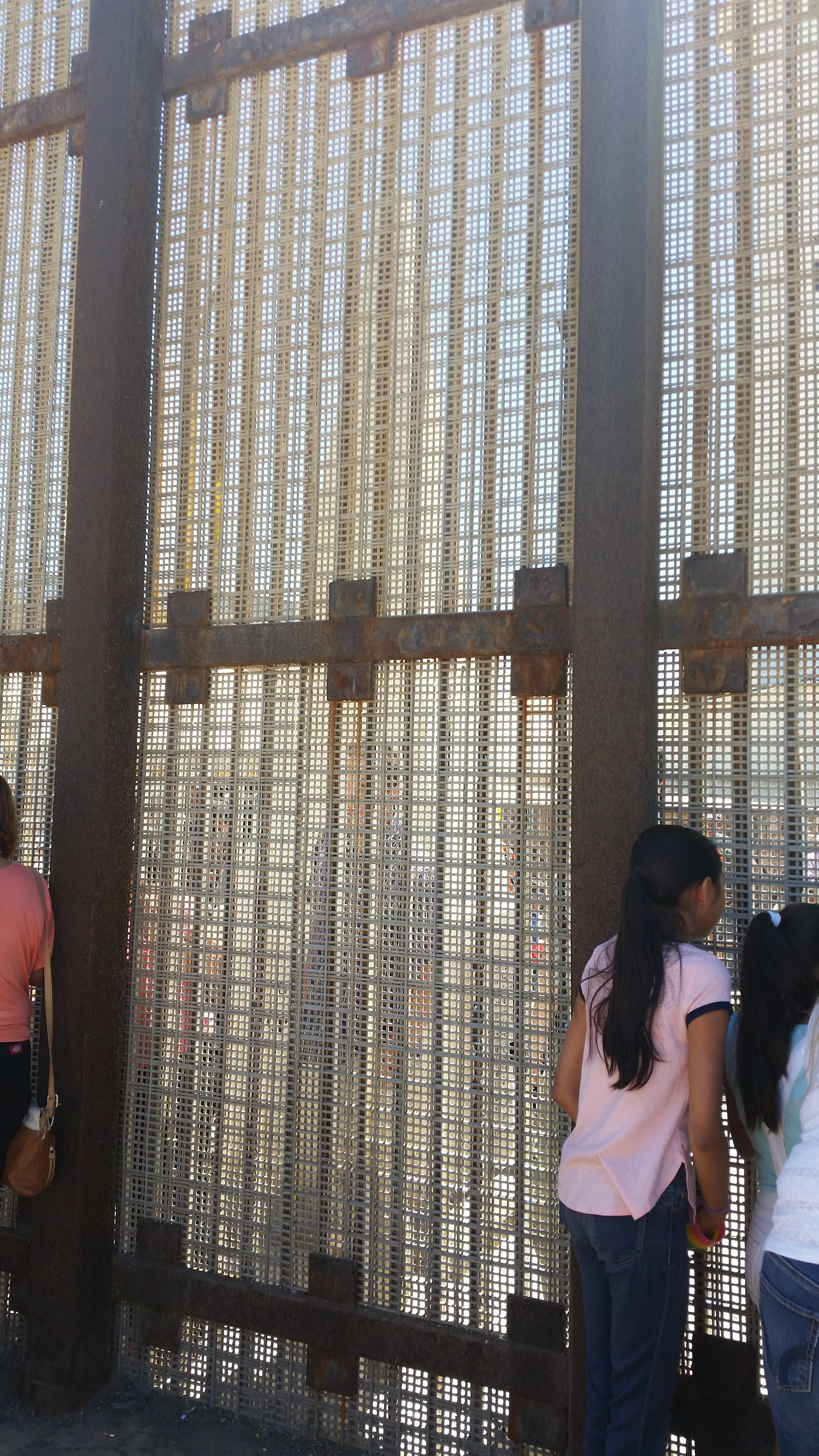
Looking south at the boundary Monument as seen from Friendship Park in the 2010s (old fence)

In 2012, under pressure from the public and activist groups, the federal government agreed to reopen the park with an outer perimeter fence blocking access to the public except when permitted by the U.S. Border Patrol, which controls access to the park.

Children's Day events 2013–2017

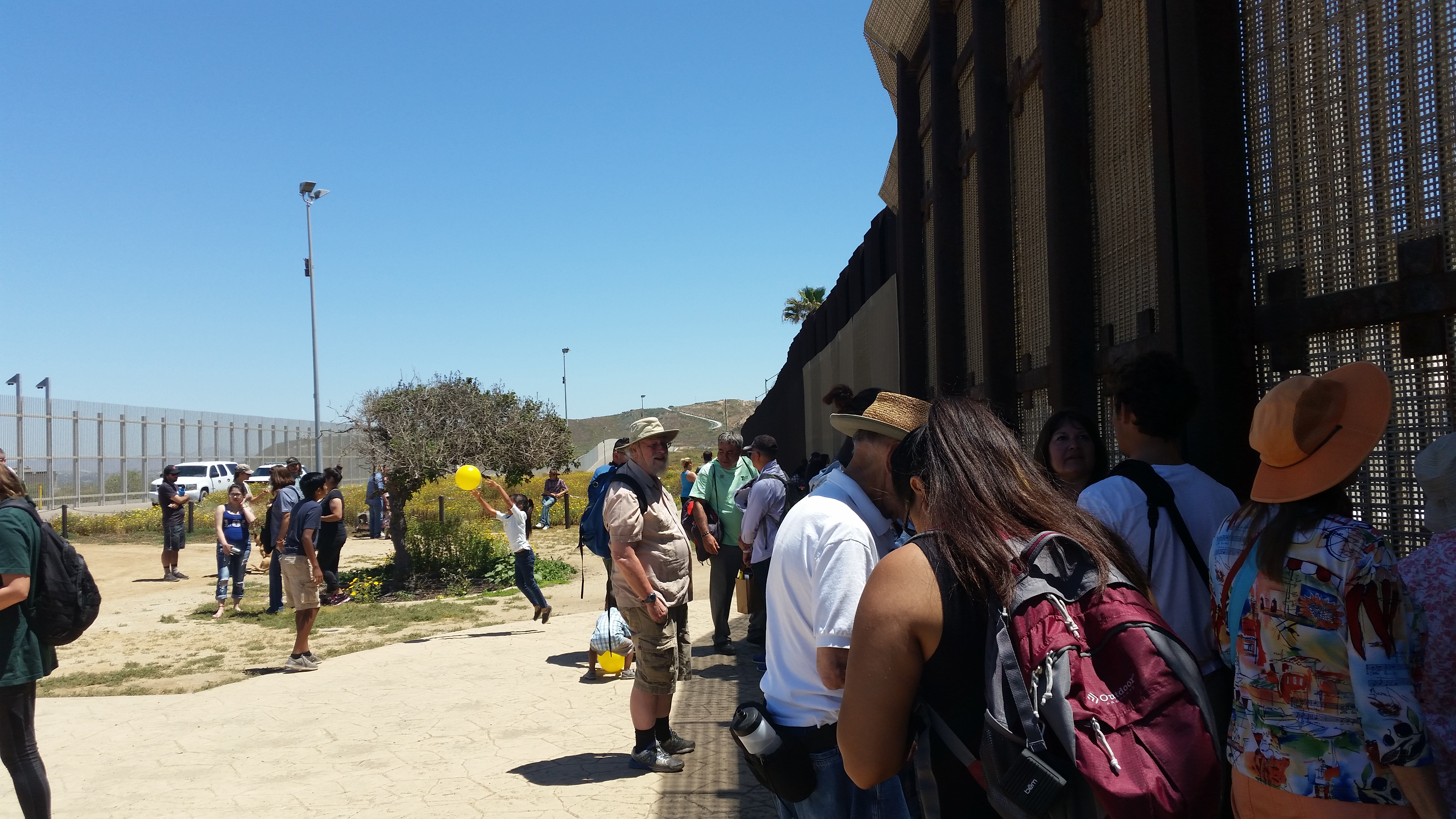
People gather on Children's day 2017 on the American side in the Park to greet people in Mexico

At the private request of the humanitarian organization Border Angels, the U.S. government allowed a gate in the fence at Friendship Park to be opened briefly on Children's Day, a holiday celebrated in April in Mexico. The first such event took place in 2013, and it was repeated in 2015 and 2016. Border Patrol officers lifted a steel girder that locks a solitary gate in the fence from the U.S. side. Children and adults from a small number of pre-selected families divided by the border were allowed to meet and embrace briefly. San Diego Customs Border Protection (CBP) Sector chief Rodney Scott announced in April 2018 that the door opening event would no longer be allowed to take place. The reason for this decision was that Border Angels founder Enrique Morones had arranged for a wedding to take place, and the groom was a convicted, major drug smuggler. Border Patrol agents attended the wedding, which received widespread local, national and international media coverage. This was a great embarrassment for the San Diego CBP sector command. The Children's Day event is no longer being allowed, and it did not change the terms of access for the thousands of families who visit Friendship Park each year for the purpose of reuniting with their families.

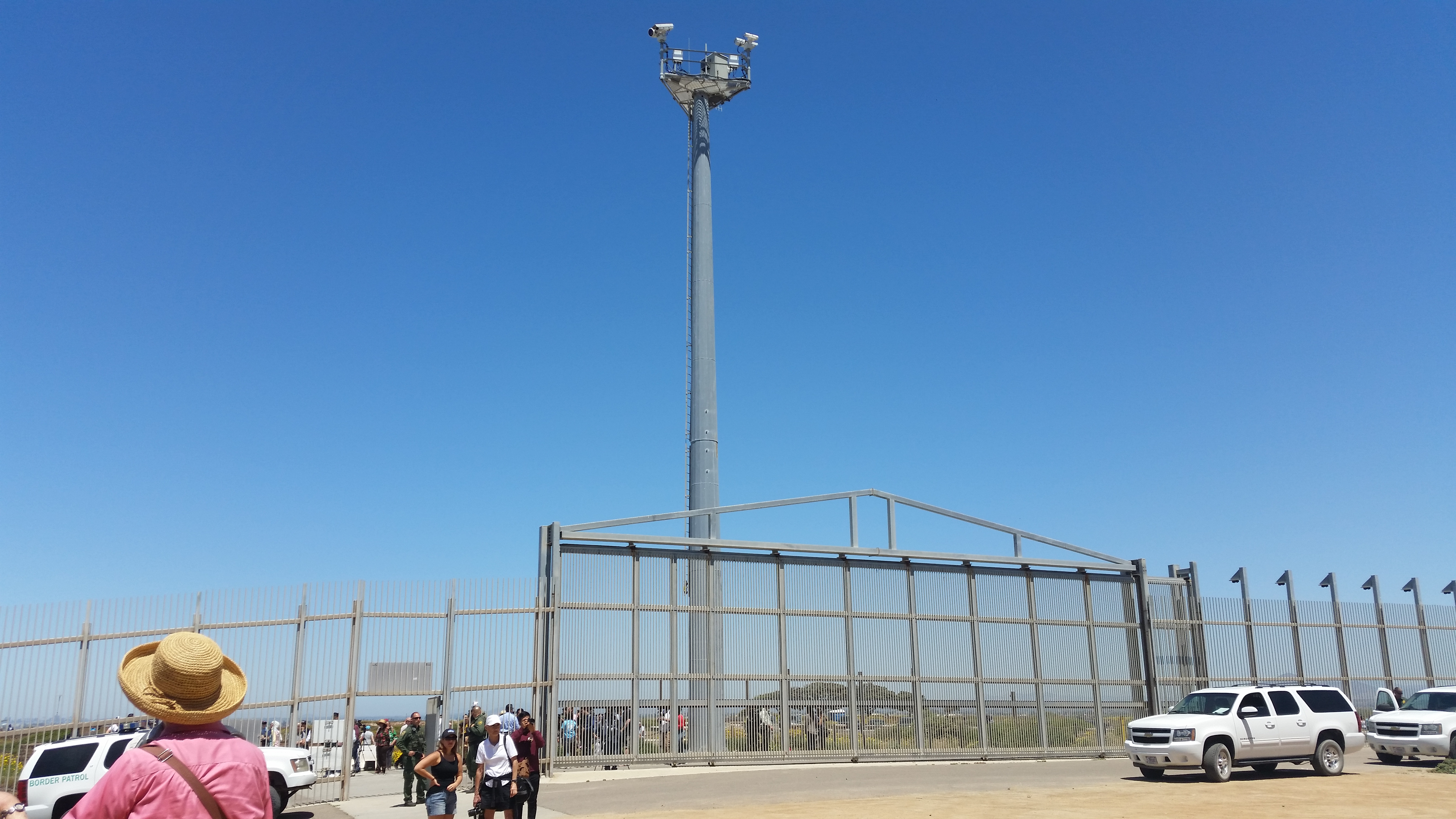
Looking north through the Friendship Park gate

Covid and wall replacement project

The Park was closed completely when the COVID-19 pandemic struck, before that the park would open on weekends on a regular schedule.

In 2021, the 50th anniversary of the opening of the friendship park was remembered, and there was overall a push to make the area a nicer area. One idea was to expand the park to 40 acres on the USA side to make it more inviting, and enable people to have international hugs again.

In 2022, the Biden administration approved a Trump-era project to complete a section of the border wall. In August, U.S. Customs and Border Protection agreed to pause plans for a double border wall that critics say would effectively destroy the park. In response to concerns, they announced in January 2023 that the 30-foot tall tightly spaced steel bollards (9.1 m), which are more difficult to see through than current material, would dip to 18 feet (5.5 m) for a small section. The Mexican Navy guarded the gap between old and new walls during construction on the Mexican side.

The old wall had colorful murals on the Mexican side, and many of these sections were preserved during the wall renovation by a collaboration between a museum and art activists. The overall design of the new wall integrated local feedback and border security standards. One loss was the binational garden was destroyed during the construction process, but there is plans for a new landscaped in the park for the area that may include walkway down to the ocean, landscaped plants, seating, and touch areas although the final design is not decided.

By mid-2024, much of the work on the new walls was completed, but there was still work to do on the park, and it remains closed. Artists have already started to add new murals on replacement wall in 2024 on the south.

== Access and locality ==
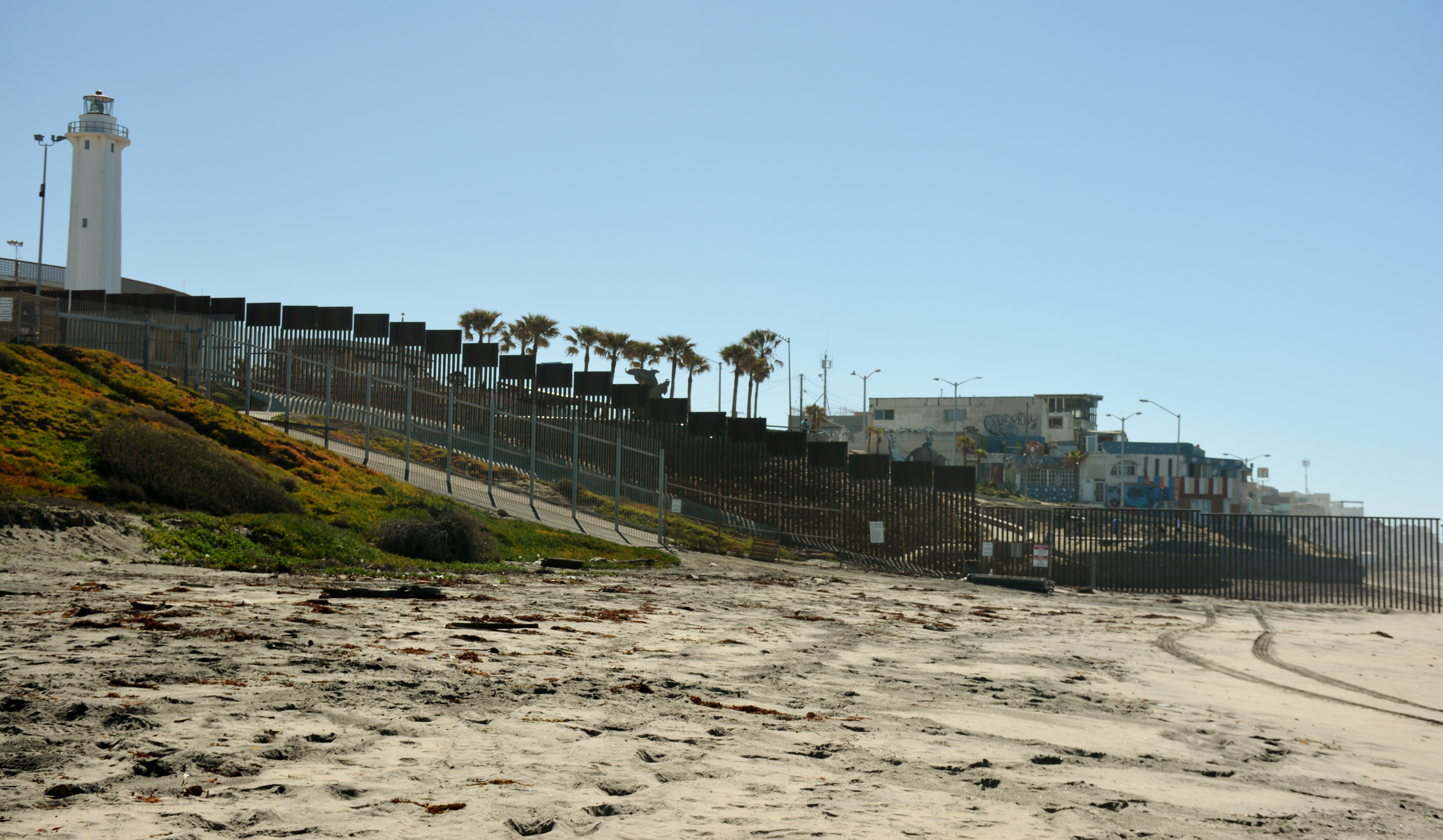
Looking from Imperial Beach, USA at the west end of Park. On the left is Tijuana lighthouse south of the border. Taken in 2016 these fences have since been demolished.

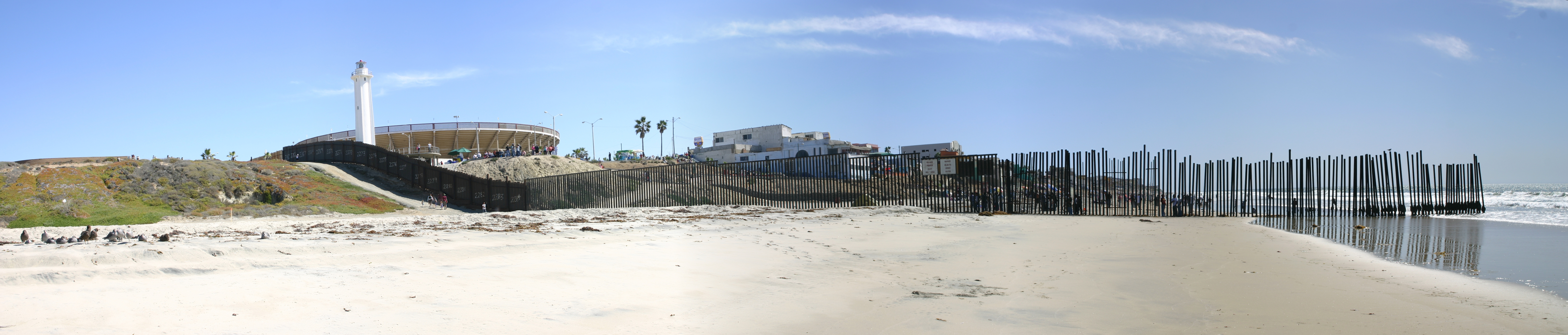
Looking south, the bullring and lighthouse (faro) in Mexico can be seen on the opposite site of the fence. Whereas the US side is mostly a nature reserve (Tijuana river estuary), the Mexican side is the northwest corner of an urban area

The Park is on the U.S. side of the border, and is fenced on both sides and east, but on the west side it opens to the Pacific Ocean. On the USA side is Border Field State Park, and on the Mexican Side is Playas de Tijuana. However, because the US side is more of nature reserve and on the opposite side of the Tijuana river estuary, which has its outflow on the USA side, the Mexican side of the park has more people as its northwest corner of Mexican city of Tijuana.

The binational garden included landscaped plant beds on both sides of border and inside Friendship park. The beds were in circles, and each bed had a theme; plant beds included the Mirror Garden, the Yellow Flower Garden, and Cactus Garden. The beds were linked by a flowing bed of White Sage River (Salvia Apiana). The gardens were lost on the U.S. side during the wall replacement in the early 2020s.

=== U.S. side ===
To access the USA side, entry is through the Border Field State Park, and then there is a pedestrian trail or road. The walk is about 1.8 miles, but in both cases travel can be disrupted if the Tijuana river floods, which can damage the trail or make the road impassable.

In the 2010s, the U.S. Border Patrol allowed public access to the park on Saturdays and Sundays between 10:00 a.m. and 2:00 p.m. Visitors to the park must first enter Border Field State Park on Monument Road either by vehicle or, if vehicle access is closed, by foot for 1.8 miles (2.9 km) to reach the park at Monument Mesa. Border Patrol may limit access to the number of visitors allowed in the park and may check IDs. No item can be passed through the fence and doing so is a customs violation. The access was stopped in 2020 because of the COVID-19 pandemic.

Access to the park may be discontinued according to the 2022-approved project to build a new wall that would not include gates for pedestrian access. The replacement wall does have gates for access as of 2024.

As of 2024, the park is still closed; there are concerns about its reopening date.

=== Mexico side ===
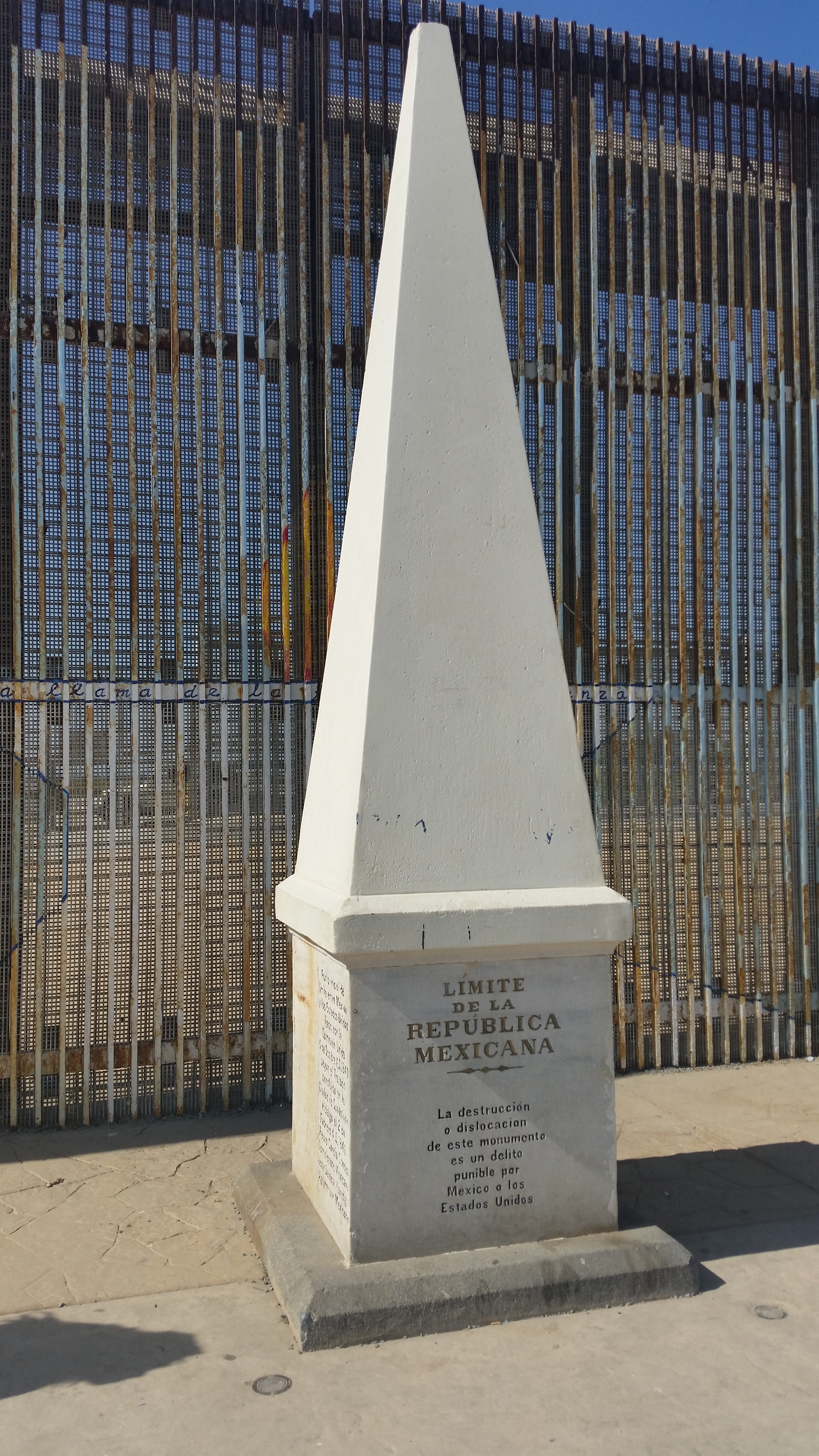
The 19th century stone border marker, Mexican side looking north

South of the border is Playas de Tijuana, which is on the northwest corner of the city of Tijuana. The wall is open to public access and is painted with colorful murals.

Playas de Tijuana includes the Mexican landmarks including the Tijuana Lighthouse and Bullring, but also the U.S.-Mexican border monument is now only accessible on the Mexican side. U.S. Border Marker 258 is popular attraction on the Mexican side, and is white marble stone with inscriptions dating to the 19th century. (see Border marker #258)

In 2023, a preserved section of the Berlin wall was put on display at the border on the Mexican side.

== Advocacy ==
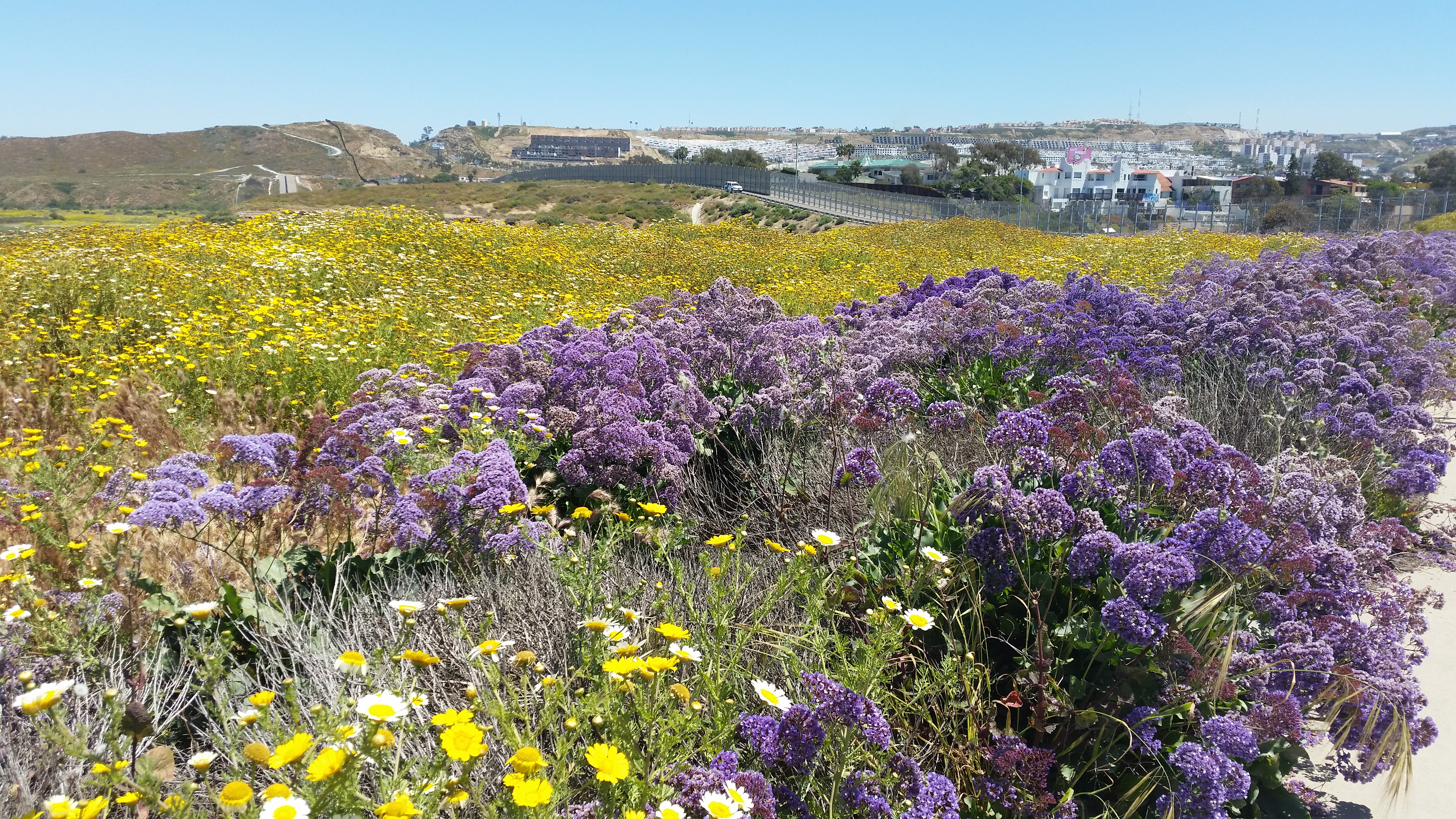
Wildflowers growing near Friendship park. The US side in nature park, while across is the urban outskirts of Tijuana. The Tijuana river cross the border south of San Diego into a swampy estuary, which then empties into the Pacific

Former First Lady Mrs. Nixon was one of the original advocates of the park, believing in the friendship between the two nations, and hoped the park would be a place people from the two countries could make friends with each other.

Friends of Friendship Park is an organization of community members working for unrestricted access to this historic border site. The organization works on behalf of many families who depend on the park to see their families and friends.

Via International is a San Diego organization that supports social and environmental goals of the park area, and used to organize tours of the site before the pandemic.

== See also ==
- Initial Point of Boundary Between U.S. and Mexico
- Bullring by the Sea (south of the Friendship park in Mexico)
