= Harvest of Empire: The Untold Story of Latinos in America =

- Theatrical release poster
- Directed by: Peter Getzels; Eduardo López
- Written by: Juan González
- Produced by: Wendy Thompson-Marquez; Eduardo López
- Narrated by: Juan Gonzalez
- Cinematography: James M. Felter
- Edited by: Peter Getzels; Catherine Shields
- Music by: Chris Biondo; Lenny Williams
- Production companies: Onyx Films; EVS Communications; Loquito Productions
- Release date: September 2012
- Running time: 90 minutes
- Country: United States
- Language: English

Harvest of Empire: The Untold Story of Latinos in America is a 2012 feature-length documentary film based on the book Harvest of Empire: A History of Latinos in America, written by journalist Juan González. The film was directed by Peter Getzels and Eduardo López, and premiered in New York and Los Angeles on September 28.

== Cast ==
- Junot Díaz
- Luis Enrique
- Juan González
- Maria Hinojosa
- Jesse Jackson
- Rigoberta Menchú
- Geraldo Rivera
- Anthony Romero

== Production ==
The film examines the role of the United States military and economic interests in Latin American countries. It documents the relationship between United States' intervention in the Dominican Republic, Guatemala, Nicaragua, and El Salvador, and the surge of migration from those nations. It links this exodus to the present massive Latino population in the United States. Also discussed are the wars fought by United States resulting in colonial expansion into Puerto Rico, Cuba, and over half of Mexico. It documents the covert actions by the United States to install dictatorships in the Dominican Republic, Guatemala, Nicaragua, and El Salvador.

The film features interviews with Nobel Prize winner Rigoberta Menchú, Jesse Jackson, executive director of the ACLU Anthony Romero, Junot Díaz, Lorenzo Meyer, Maria Hinojosa, Geraldo Rivera, musician Luis Enrique, Border Angels founder Enrique Morones, and poet Martin Espada.

== Reception ==
On Rotten Tomatoes, the film has an approval rating of 86% based on 7 reviews. On Metacritic, which assigns a weighted average rating, the film has received an average score of 66 out of 100, based on 7 critics, indicating "generally favorable" reviews.

Stephanie Merry of The Washington Post gave the film 3 out of 4 stars, writing, "While the documentary connects some dots more effectively than others, the overall feeling is effective; the film complicates an already complex debate." Rachel Saltz of The New York Times commented that "while the abuses of American power are demonstrated and the American embrace of Latinos shown to be less than open-armed, the filmmakers retain a touching faith that most Americans won't tolerate injustice when they know about it." Peter Hartlaub of San Francisco Chronicle stated that "The biggest strength is in the pacing and editing." He added, "A lot of ground is covered, but the focus is always clear, and the ample use of historical film helps to fight off the potential for audience boredom."
