= José Angel Figueroa =

Puerto Rican poet (born 1946)

- Born: November 28, 1946 (age 79); Mayagüez, Puerto Rico
- Education: New York University (B.A.); SUNY Buffalo (M.A.); Fordham University (P.D.)
- Occupations: professor, poet, author, actor
- Writing career
- Language: English; Spanish

José Angel Figueroa (born November 28, 1946) is a Puerto Rican poet, actor, author, editor, and a professor in the Humanities who has published poetry, fiction, and drama in the United States. He is best known for his poetry and is considered one of the first Neorican poets and contributed to the rise of the Nuyorican Literary movement. He was an early contributor to the Nuyorican Poets Café and has influenced the scene of Latino literature in New York through education, writing, and outreach.

== Early life and education ==
Born in Mayagüez, Puerto Rico on November 28, 1946, Figueroa moved back and forth with his family between the mainland and the island when he was nine years old. His family were migrant workers until they achieved financial stability and settled down in the Southeast Bronx, New York], where he graduated from Morris High School. He went on to attend New York University's Steinhardt School of Culture, Education, and Human Development where he received a full scholarship and earned a bachelor's degree in English Literature and Education. He also earned a master's writing fellowship at SUNY Buffalounder the tutelage of Robert Bly, John Logan, and Robert Creeley; and a professional degree in Educational Administration and Supervision from Fordham University's Graduate School of Education.

== Career ==
José Angel Figueroa has dedicated his life to bringing awareness to the Latino American, Neorican, and Nuyorican experience. His work is concerned with various Latino American diaspora and finds its focus within the Puerto Rican community in New York. He is best known for his poetry but has written books of poetry and prose and has also written dramas and jazz operas. He has dedicated most of his adult life to educating both adults and children in public schools, colleges and universities, and communities venues and prisons. He has also become an important Children's literature specialist who contributed to the production, Spoken Word performance, and publication of over 68 anthologies of children and youth original writings and oral stories, sponsored by NYS Boards of Education, Poets in the Schools, Teachers & Writers Collaborative, Inc., and statewide Arts Commissions. Figueroa is a professor of Puerto Rican, Latin American & Caribbean Literature, English Composition, and Creative Writing at Boricua College in the Bronx.JAF

Name of Work	Type	Year
A Mirror In My Own Backstage	Prose/Poetry	2013
Un Espejo En Mi Propio Bastidor (Spanish)	Prose	2013
Hypocrisy Held Hostage	Prose	2007
King of the Crabs	Opera	1986
Noo Jork	Prose	1981
Transnightification	Drama	1979
East 110th Street	Poetry	1973

José Angel Figueroa has also made important contributions to anthologies, literary journals and magazines such as The Norton Anthology of Latino Literature, Harvest of Empire: A History of Latinos in America, Hispanic Condition: Reflections on Culture & Identity, Harvard Educational Review, Revista Chicano-Riqueña, Black Creation, Latin NY, From the Belly of the Shark, Latin American Voices, For Chile, For Neruda, Nuyorican Poetry: An Anthology of Puerto Rican Words and Feelings, Puerto Rican Writers at Home in the USA, Papiros De Babel: Antología de la poesía puertorriqueña en Nueva York, Aloud: Voices from the Nuyorican Poets Cafe, Bum Rush the Page: A Def Poetry Jam, Red, White, and Blues: Poets On The Promise of America, Caribbean Erotic, and Amanecida: Antología Homenaje a Julia De Burgos.

== Literary style and criticism ==
José Angel Figueroa's poetry is best known for its commentary on the immigrant experience. He speaks from a point of experience and expresses the hardship that occurs for those who leave their home countries before, during, and after migration. East 110th Street, his best known work, is a book of poetry that uses English, Spanish, and Spanglish to express emotions of the everyday. The poems' subject matter ranges from tributes to other important Latino American writers to scenes of East Harlem. Many of his poems use wordplay in conjunction with mixed language and Spanglish, which creates a sense of confusion for the reader and demonstrates the complexity and layers of the lifestyle that many in the community live. He also makes use of pattern poems which forces the reader to visualize and read the poem in the intended tone and with the intended timing. He uses his pattern poems to emphasize the space that cannot necessarily be filled between English and Spanish: the words that don't translate and the experiences that are unique to immigrants and especially, Puerto Ricans in New York.
