= Initial Point of Boundary Between U.S. and Mexico =

International border marker

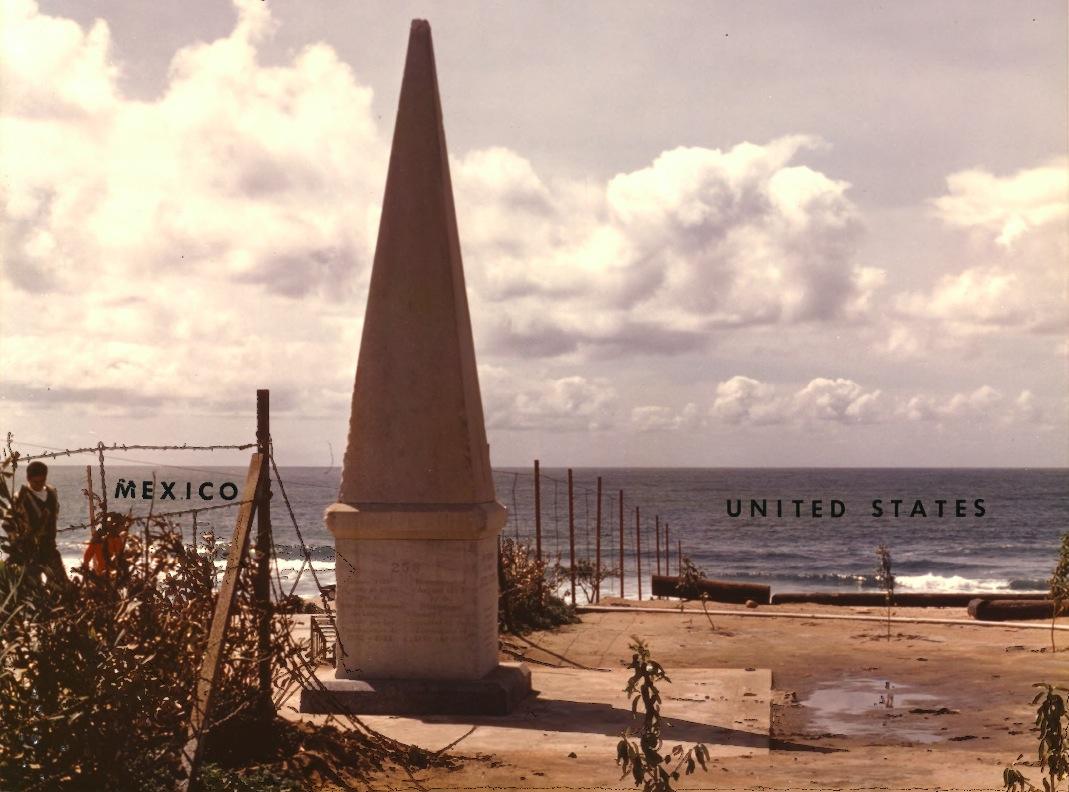
- The monument in a 1974 photo

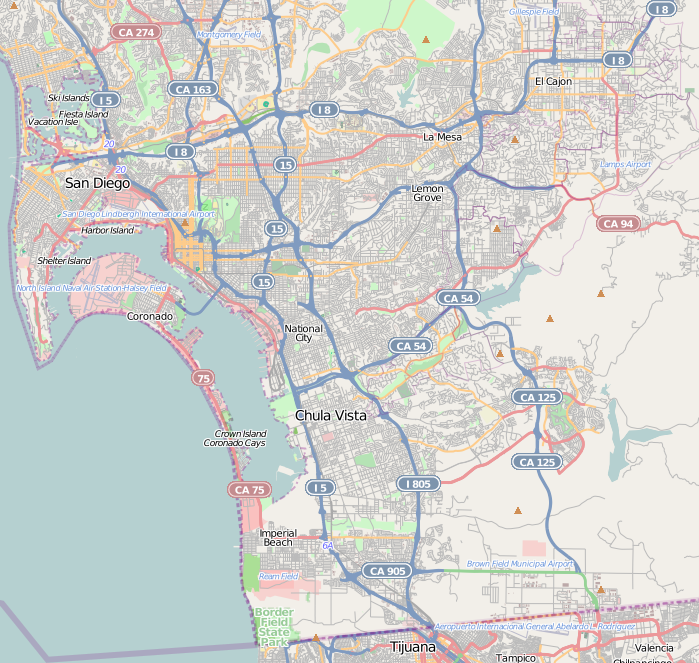
- location in Imperial Beach, California
- 32°32′4″N 117°7′19″W
- Location: S of Imperial Beach off Monument Rd., Imperial Beach, California

History
- Built: 1851

Site notes
- Area: 0.1 acres (0.040 ha)
- Governing body: Federal

U.S. National Register of Historic Places
- Designated: September 6, 1974
- Reference no.: 74000550

The Initial Point of Boundary Between U.S. and Mexico (Monument No. 258) is the westernmost boundary marker on the international boundary between the United States and Mexico and as such has since its erection marked the southwestern corner of the Continental United States. According to the 1848 Treaty of Guadalupe Hidalgo, the initial border point is set as one marine league (three nautical miles) south of the southernmost point of San Diego Bay, and the border proceeds in a straight line towards the confluence of the Colorado River and the Gila River.

The significance of the monument is stated in the inscription on the west side of the original marble shaft:

"Initial point of Boundary between the United States and Mexico, established by the Joint Commission, 10 October, A.D. 1849, Agreeably to the Treaty dated at the City of Guadalupe, Hidalgo, February 2, A.D. 1848. John B. Weller, U.S. Commissioner. Andrew B. Gray, U.S. Surveyor."

== History ==
The boundary marker was first established as a cairn of rocks in 1849 following the signing of the Treaty of Guadalupe Hidalgo. A white marble shaft was manufactured in New York, transported around Cape Horn on the USS Supply to San Diego, and erected and dedicated at the site in Imperial Beach in June, 1851. The marble monument was an obelisk about 20 feet (6 metres) in height, resting on a marble pedestal. On its top was an inverted acorn to symbolize the strength and stature of the California live oak tree.

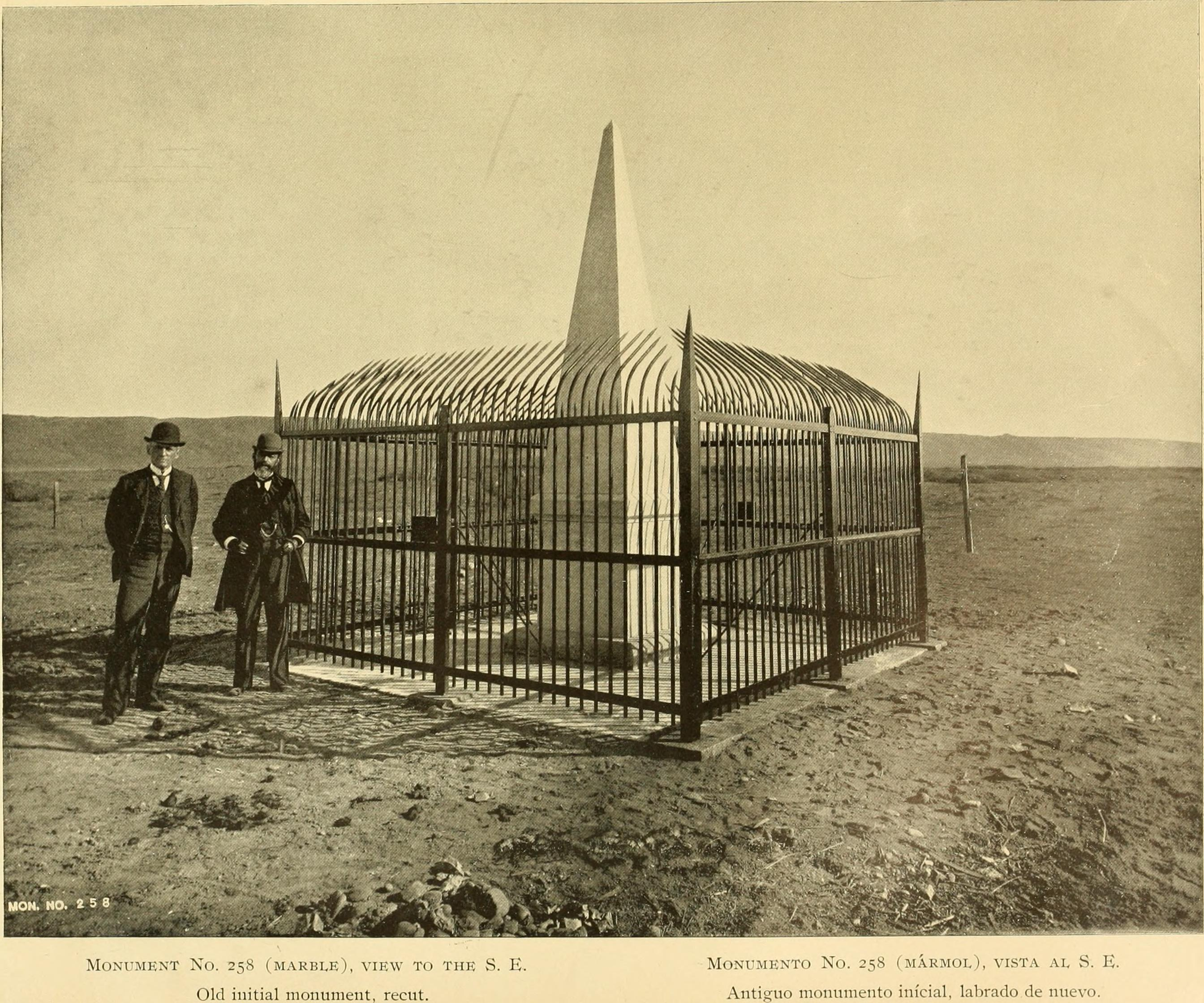
The monument in the 1890s

In 1894 it was found that the initial monument had become so mutilated by visitors that its outlines were nearly destroyed, and its inscriptions partly obliterated. The Barlow-Blanco Commission had the monument renovated in San Diego, reconstructed at the site, and protected with an enclosure in 1894. Excepting for normal wear and tear and some slight vandalism, as of 1974 the marble monument as reconstructed in 1894 still stood at its original site.

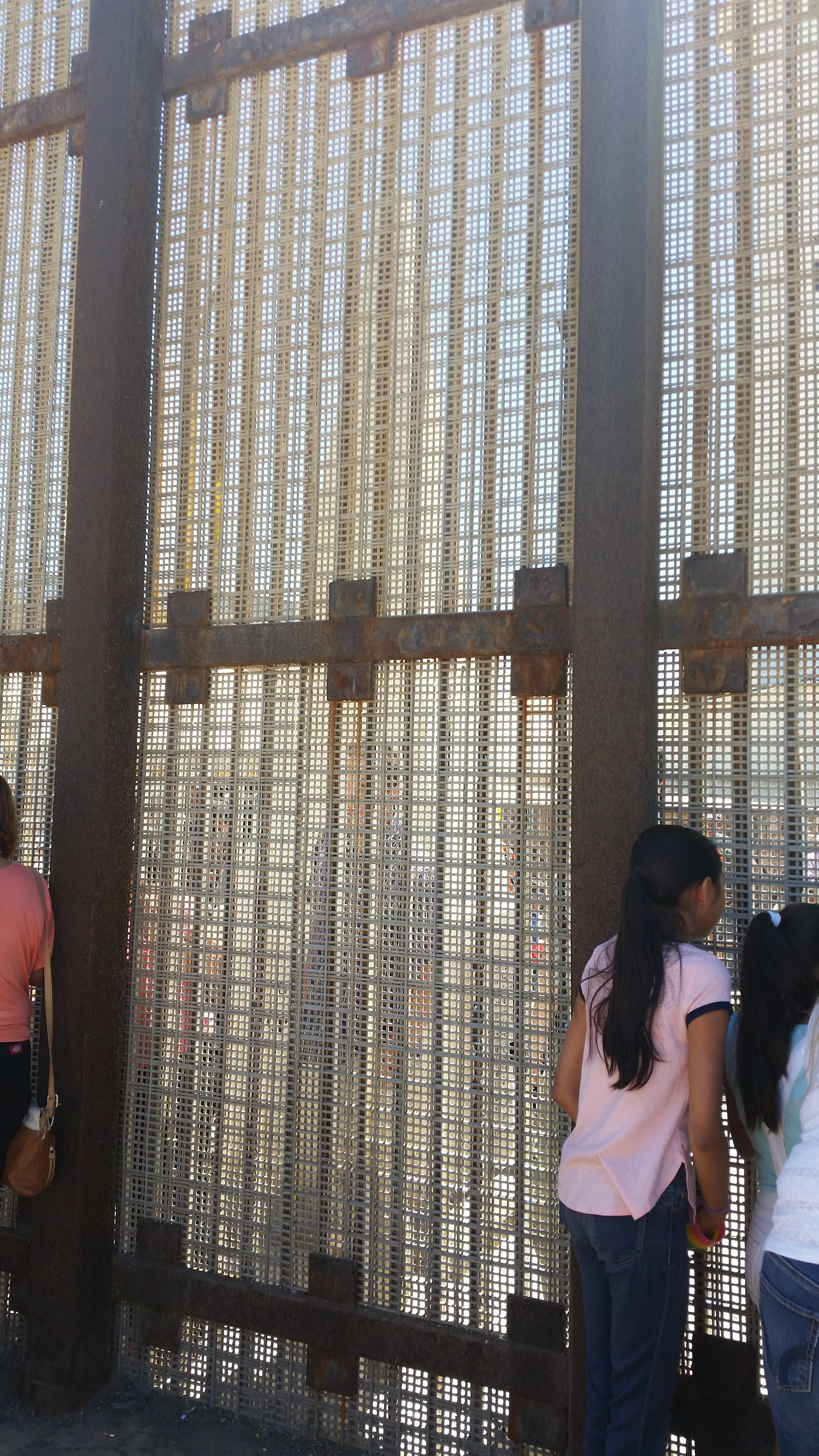
Monument in 2017 seen from Friendship Park.

Pursuant to President Richard Nixon's "Legacy of Parks", Mrs. Pat Nixon in August 1971 turned over 372 acres (151 ha) of surplus Navy land, formerly known as Border Field, to the people of California as a beach park. The area is now known as Border Field State Park.

Prior to 1994, the US-Mexico border fence bisected the marker. In 1994, access to the marker was inhibited from the United States side by Operation Gatekeeper. The current border fence passes several feet to the north of the marker, and it is possible to fully circumambulate the monument from Playas de Tijuana in Mexico, where it remains a popular attraction.

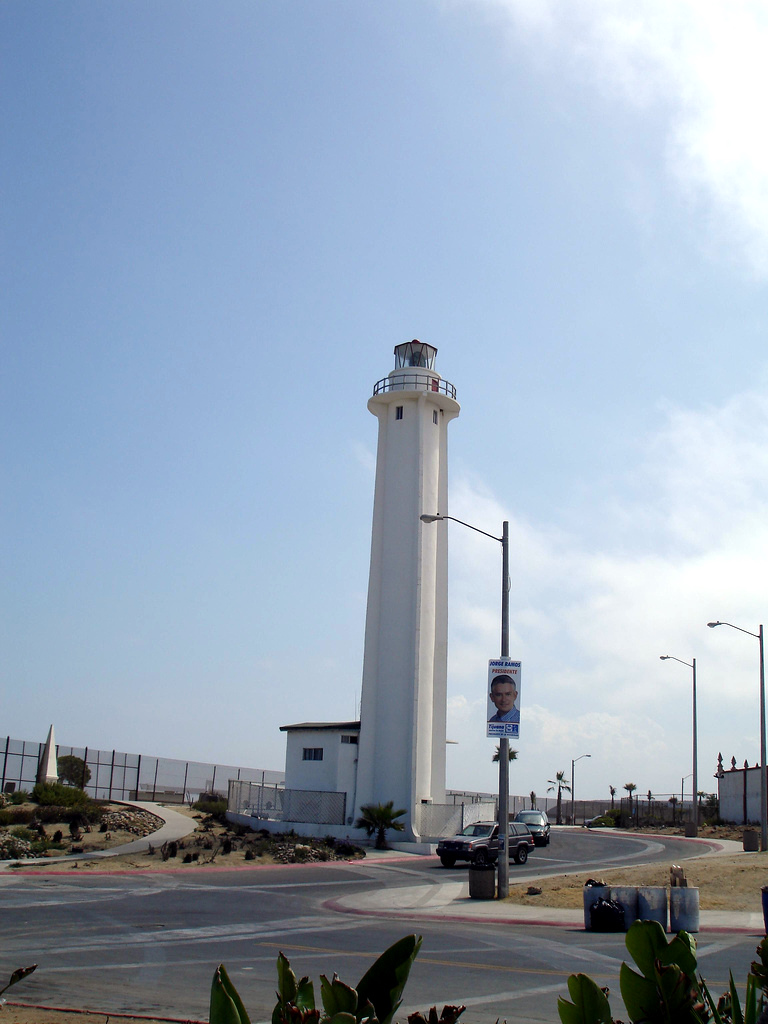
The border site in 2011 facing northeast from Mexico. The monument, now completely south of the border fence, can be seen in the background to the left of the Tijuana Lighthouse.

== See also ==
- Friendship Park (San Diego–Tijuana)
