= Juan González (journalist) =

Puerto Rican journalist (born 1947)

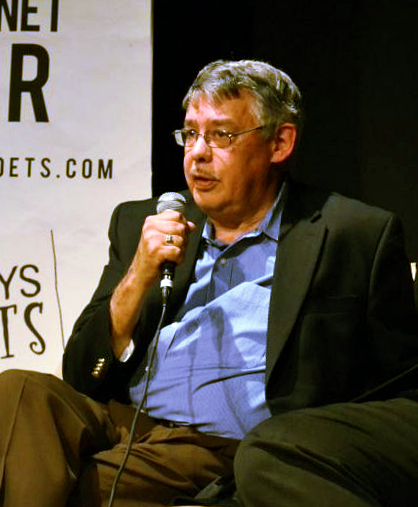
- González in 2011
- Born: October 15, 1947 (age 79); Ponce, Puerto Rico, U.S.
- Education: Columbia University (BA)
- Presenting career
- Show: Democracy Now!
- Station: Over 1000
- Network: Pacifica Radio
- Style: Investigative journalism

Juan González (born October 15, 1947) is a Puerto Rican progressive broadcast journalist and investigative reporter. He was also a columnist for the New York Daily News from 1987 to 2016. He frequently co-hosts the radio and television program Democracy Now! with Amy Goodman.

== Early life ==
González was born on October 15, 1947, in Ponce, Puerto Rico to Juan González, who was a veteran of the Puerto Rican 65th Infantry during World War II, and Florinda Rivera de González. González was raised in East Harlem and Brooklyn. After a period as editor of his high school newspaper, the Lane Reporter, González attended Columbia College and graduated in 1968.

At Columbia College he was active in the anti-Vietnam War movement and played a leading role in the 1968 Columbia University protests as one of three "Strike Central" representatives on the strike coordinating committee. In the student strike that followed the police action that ended the occupation he continued in this role and in negotiations at the apartment of Eugene Galanter. He was a member of Students for a Democratic Society and a founding member of the New York City branch of the Young Lords, serving on its first central committee as its Minister of Education.

In 1981, he was elected president of the National Congress for Puerto Rican Rights, a political organization that concentrated on registering Latino voters.

== Journalism career ==
After just a couple of weeks into studying journalism at Temple University, González's instructor encouraged him to apply for a post at the instructor's other workplace the Philadelphia Daily News. González application led him to become a clerk in 1978; however, within months he quickly was employed as a full-time reporter.

In 1987, González landed a job as a reporter for The Village Voice. However, soon after returning to New York González was offered his own column and better salary at the New York Daily News and so he chose to work there instead. While working for the New York Daily News, González won his first George Polk Award in 1998 for "unflinching" investigative reporting.

González is former president of the National Association of Hispanic Journalists, for which he created the Parity Project, an innovative program designed to help news organizations recruit and retain Hispanic reporters and managers. In 2008, The National Association of Hispanic Journalists inducted González into the organization's Hall of Fame. In addition, he has been named by Hispanic Business Magazine as one of America's most influential Hispanics, as well as earning a Lifetime Achievement Award from the Hispanic Academy of Media Arts and Sciences. For two years, González was the Belle Zeller Visiting Professor in Public Policy and Administration at Brooklyn College/CUNY, with an appointment in both the Department of Puerto Rican and Latino Studies, as well as the Political Science Department.

In December 2006, he reported the results of an exclusive interview with the purported "fourth man" who was present at the scene on November 25 when plainclothes NYPD officers shot and killed Sean Bell.

González has written extensively on the health effects arising from the September 11 attacks and the cover-up of Ground Zero air hazards in columns in the New York Daily News. He was the first reporter in New York City to write on the health effects arising from the September 11, 2001 attacks.

González was awarded the 2010 Justice in Action Award from the Asian American Legal Defense and Education Fund, and, in 2011, won the George Polk Award a second time for a series of columns in the New York Daily News which exposed criminal acts connected with then-Mayor Michael Bloomberg’s CityTime project, a new computerized payroll system, leading to the federal indictment of four consultancies for fraud.

The voices of González and Amy Goodman, from an episode of "Democracy Now", were used (uncredited) over news footage concerning Hurricane Katrina in the opening montage of New Orleans at the beginning of the action-drama film Streets of Blood (2009). He has said that a prime motivating force in his work has been, "a sense about the unjust treatment of people".

In 2015, the New York City chapter of the Society of Professional Journalists inducted González into its New York Journalism Hall of Fame, along with Max Frankel, Charlie Rose, Lesley Stahl, Paul Steiger, and Richard Stolley.

Since 2018, he has held the post of Professor of Professional Practice at Rutgers University-New Brunswick's School of Communication and Information.

=== Books ===
González has written four books:

- Fallout: The Environmental Consequences of the World Trade Center Collapse (2002; ISBN 1-56584-845-4), documents cover-ups by Environmental Protection Agency and government officials with regard to health hazards at Ground Zero in New York.
- Harvest of Empire: A History of Latinos in America (2009, 2011, 2022) excerpt
- Roll Down Your Window: Stories of a Forgotten America
- Reclaiming Gotham: Bill de Blasio and the Movement to End America’s Tale of Two Cities (2017)

González is also the co-author, with Joseph Torres, of News for All the People: The Epic Story of Race and the American Media (2011; ISBN 978-1-84467-687-3), a history of the American media with special focus on media outlets owned and controlled by people of color, and how they were suppressed—sometimes violently—by mainstream political, corporate and media leaders.

=== Film ===
- Harvest of Empire: A History of Latinos in America, a film adaptation from the book of the same name.

== See also ==
- Giuliani Time
- New Yorkers in journalism
