= Enrique Morones =

Immigration activist

Personal details
- Born: San Diego, California
- Relations: Luis Napoleón Morones
- Education: San Diego State University, University of San Diego
- Occupation: Director, Gente Unida
- Profession: Activist, Marketer
- Website: www.GenteUnidasd.net

Enrique Morones is the founder and former executive director of San Diego–based human rights organization Border Angels from 1986 to 2019. After retiring from the Border Angels in 2019, he is currently the executive director of Gente Unida, a human rights border coalition.

He also is founder of House of Mexico, established ”to share, celebrate, educate and promote the rich art, culture, and history of Mexico to San Diego and its visitors.”

== Early life ==
He was born in San Diego and is the son of Luis Morones and Laura Carega, and grandson of Mexican Union leader Luis N. Morones He grew up in the area of Barrio Logan in a Catholic Mexican-American family. His father Luis Morones worked for the Mexico Fish and Game Department in San Diego before becoming the head of Aeroméxico's operations in San Diego. Morones says the major influences in his life were his parents and grandfather, Luis N. Morones.

Enrique graduated from Saint Augustine High School in 1974 and was awarded a four-year scholarship to the University of San Diego where he studied a wide variety of subjects including psychology, oceanography, French and karate. He later transferred to San Diego State University first to run track, and later to study marketing, graduating with a degree in International Marketing. He would later return to the University of San Diego to complete a Masters in Executive Leadership. [Source: Morones, Enrique (2012). The Power of One: The Story of the Border Angels. San Diego State University Press. p. 7.]

== San Diego Padres ==
Enrique Morones was the Vice President of Latino Marketing for the professional baseball team, the San Diego Padres, which he joined in 1995 and worked for until 2001. While working for the Padres, Enrique became the first person to receive dual US–Mexican nationality, and received his documents from Mexican President Ernesto Zedillo in 1998. [Source: Morones, Enrique (2012). The Power of One: The Story of the Border Angels. San Diego State University Press. p. 7.] Morones was released by the Padres in 2001 when his job was eliminated by new management.

== Border Angels ==
Enrique Morones founded San Diego–based human rights organisation Border Angels in 1986 after a meeting with Ethel Kennedy. Morones describes himself as a "proud American, and even prouder Mexican". On several occasions Morones has represented the Border Angels on television, including an interview by Tucker Carlson on the Fox News Network in January 2016. Morones is also credited as the first person to hold dual US-Mexico citizenship since 1998.

Morones retired from Border Angels in 2019 after an internal investigation for sexual harassment of two women. He is now Executive Director of Gente Unida, a coalition that supports refugee children and migrant families.

== Gente Unida ==
As founder of Gente Unida (a human rights border coalition) in April 2005, he led a national effort against the vigilante minutemen. Gente Unida (GU), is a California based non-profit 501c3, focused on providing services and arts and culture programs in response to the challenges of immigrants along the US and Mexican border. GU is called to highlight those working for social justice and to find collective means to feed, protect, clothe, comfort and engage those in our community that have limited access to resources due to their nationality and undocumented immigration status.

In 2020 Enrique Morones launched the "Buen Hombre/Magnificent Mujer" podcast. In April 2020 he joined veteran Chicano Park artists and activists to celebrate 50 years of Chicano Park Day with a series of video interviews.

== Books ==
Enrique Morones is the co-author of "The Power of One: The Story of the Border Angels" with Richard Griswold del Castillo, published by San Diego State University Press.
