= Diane Takvorian =

Diane Takvorian is an environmental justice organizer based in San Diego, California. She was the executive director of the Environmental Health Coalition (EHC), which she co-founded in 1981 following reports of toxic chemical dumping in Barrio Logan. Since the early 1980s, Takvorian has used a community-centered organizing approach that focuses on residents taking the lead in identifying environmental risks, informing their neighbors, and pushing for environmental and public health improvements in low-income communities. Biographical accounts of Takvorian's work note that her grandparents survived the Armenian Genocide in 1915 and immigrated to the United States two years later, an experience that has helped shape her commitment to activism and social justice.

== Campaigns and organizing ==
Through her work with EHC, Takvorian participated in campaigns addressing toxic exposure, industrial land use, and public health. Accounts of the organization's early years describe it as one of California's early environmental justice groups, promoting healthier neighborhoods, toxic disclosure policies and environmental improvements in San Diego Bay. EHC also documented local health disparities and areas of concentrated pollution and advanced an approach to environmentalism that included urban communities.

Some of her work has included support for early right to know policies in San Diego, efforts to address industrial pollution and reduce diesel truck traffic in Barrio Logan and National City and campaigns that led to a California law banning lead in candy. EHC also applied its resident-focused approach through the SALTA leadership program, which has trained more than 2,000 residents from affected communities in San Diego to advocate for environmental justice. In later years, Takvorian and EHC were in campaigns on freight and port pollution. She publicly supported clear-air policies pushed by the Biden administration, while also arguing for stronger local measures.

== Public service and recognitions ==
In 2008, she received the James Irvine Foundation Leadership Award for community-based efforts to improve environmental health in low-income neighborhoods. In 2009, President Barack Obama appointed her to the Joint Public Advisory Committee of the NAFTA Commission for the Environmental Cooperation.

At the state level, she was reappointed by Governor Gavin Newsom to serve as member of the California Air Resource Board (CARB), in 2023. In that role, she supported regulations requiring manufacturers to gradually increase their sales of electric trucks and other zero-emission vehicles over time. She has also criticized proposals that relied on voluntary "environmental justice allowances" arguing that equity measures in zero.emission vehicle policy should be mandatory to not leave low-income Californians behind in the energy transition.

== Transborder activism ==
Takvorian's environmental justice work has also included crossborder organizing between San Diego and Tijuana. Histories of EHC describe the organization as building collaborations with residents of Colonia Chilpancingo in Tijuana and participating in a binational cleanup agreement in 2004. Another source states that Takvorian worked with counterparts in Mexico to address contamination from an abandoned lead-smelting maquiladora.

EHC also participated in the analysis of waste and socio-environmental vulnerability in Arroyo Alamar. This as part of a binational environmental action plan where they collaborated with Mexican organizations such as Costa Salvaje, CICEA Papalotzin, Colectivo Salud and Justicia Ambiental AC as well as local authorities in Mexico.
