= Environmental Health Coalition =

Non-profit organisation in the USA

The Environmental Health Coalition (EHC) is a San Diego-based environmental justice organization founded in 1980 by Diane Takvorian and Tony Pettina. It works with low income communities and communities of color in the San Diego region and along the U.S.-Mexico border to address environmental health risks related to excessive amounts of pollution and other environmental hazards such as hazardous air pollutants, toxic waste disposal facilities, and superfund sites. The coalition also addresses risks related to land-use planning, transportation access, and community development. EHC has participated in community research, environmental health advocacy, and policy initiatives addressing disproportionate environmental impacts in affected neighborhoods, as part of its mission statement.

== History ==
The Environmental Health Coalition was founded in 1980, originally under the name "Coalition Against Cancer". Reports of waste haulers that were dumping toxic chemicals in Barrio Logan helped catalyze the organization's change. These incidents reflected a broader conflict between industrial land use and residential neighborhoods in Barrio Logan, which became an early point for environmental justice organization in San Diego. The initial focus of the EHC was to clean up toxic waste sites like the 38th and Alpha street dumps.

In 1983, EHC launched the Household Toxics Project, which focuses on identifying and removing environmental contaminants in local houses. The organization also helped develop one of California's earliest programs to separate household hazardous waste from municipal garbage streams. In 1986, the EHC co-sponsored the Tijuana Toxics Conference, and in the same year, launched the Toxic Free Neighborhoods and Clean Bay Campaigns. EHC also documented hazardous waste shipments from the United States to facilities in Tijuana and helped bring attention to boarder environmental health risks affecting nearby communities. In 1994, the EHC launched SALTA (Salud Ambiental Lideres Tomando Accion or Environmental Health Leaders Taking Actions), which aimed to train locals in environmental health and justice. In 1996, the EHC protested the housing of nuclear aircraft carriers in San Diego Bay. In 2000, the EHC worked to draft the Military Responsibilities Act, and in 2002, it formed the Tijuana affiliate. In 2005, the coalition supported efforts to restrict diesel truck traffic on residential streets in Barrio Logan, a policy that intended to reduce residents' exposure to air pollution from nearby industrial-related transportation. In 2010, the EHC got the West Side National City Specific Plan approved, and oversaw energy stimulus money going towards San Diego residents of low income.

== Leadership ==
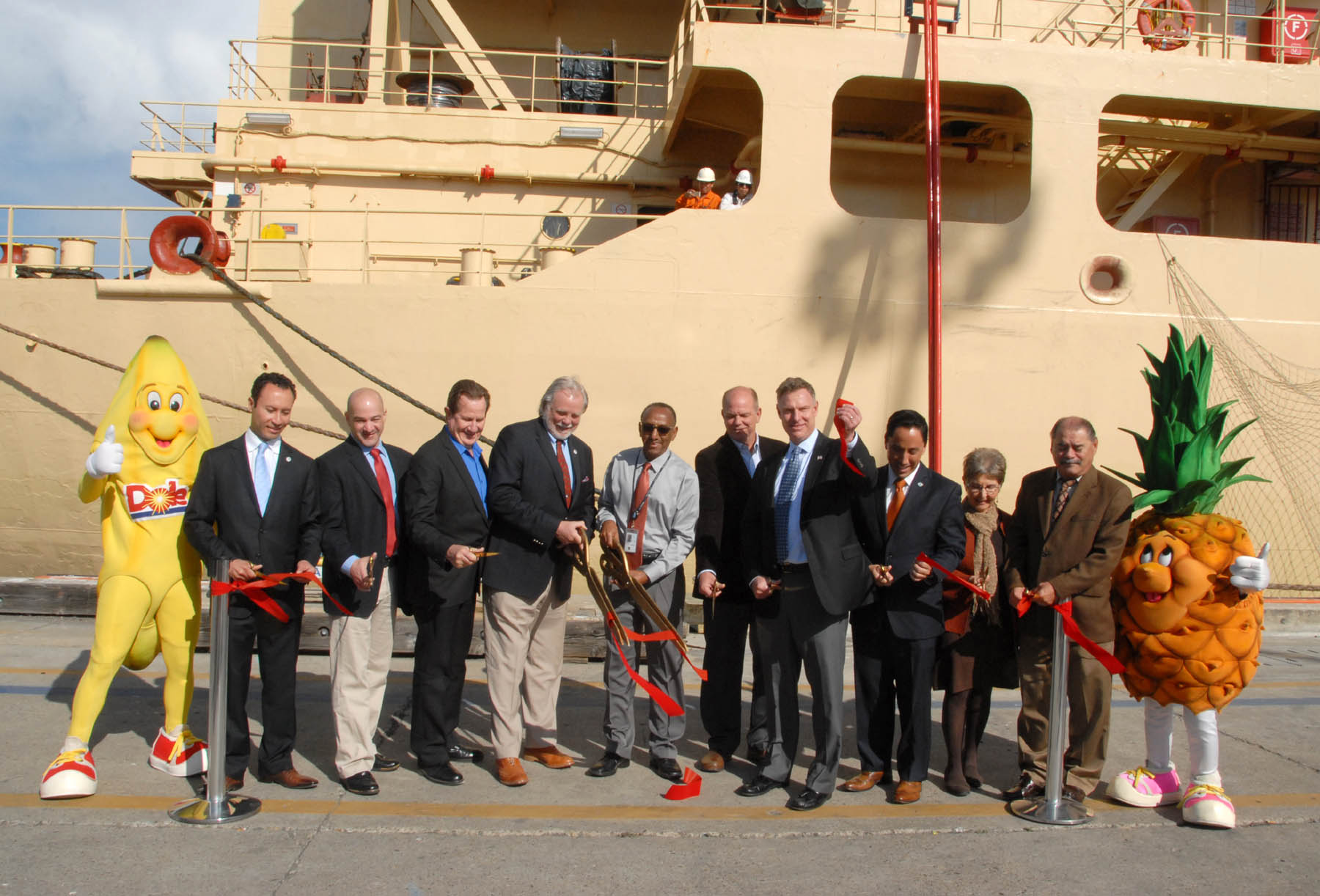
Diane Takvorian at Port of San Diego Shore Power installation

Diane Takvorian is one of the founders of the EHC. She has been the executive director since 1982, and holds a master's degree in Social Work with a focus in public policy. She has served on advisory boards at the state, national, and international level. She was appointed to the Joint Public Advisory Committee for the NAFTA Commission for Environmental Cooperation in 2009 by former president Barack Obama.

In 2008, she was awarded the James Irvine Foundation Leadership Award for her work in environmental justice issues in California. In 2016 she joined the California Air Resources Board, a statewide board responsible for creating programs that manage air pollution and aims to fight climate change.

Tony Pettina, a co-founder of the EHC, served as the treasurer of the board of directors from 1980 to 2006.

Joy Williams served as the organization's research director from 1987 to 2020, and received the Haagen-Smit Award by the California Air Resources Board in 2019 for contributions to air quality research.

== Mission and approach ==
For more than four decades, EHC has developed campaigns and initiatives that reflect its longstanding focus on social justice and against environmental racism, while also showing how their work has expanded across multiple issues such as toxic pollution, land use planning, policy advocacy, and environmental health research. The historian Andrew Wiese describes EHC as an important actor in San Diego's environmental justice movement and notes that the organization developed a broad understanding of "the environment", that went beyond conservation-oriented environmental groups, that included the urban places where residents lived, worked, and played.

A central part of EHC'S approach is community-driven planning, in which resident participate in identifying environmental health concerns, sharing information within their communities and pushing for policy changes related to pollution, land use and public health. SALTA (Salud Ambiental Líderes Tomando Acción) is one example of this approach, being a training program that teaches community leaders about organizing, policy advocacy, environmental health and public communication. Relatedly, EHC's Community Action Teams are groups of local residents who receive leadership training and may also serve on boards, commissions, planning groups, and school-related committees.

EHC has also used community-based participatory research as part of work. A study about the Toxic Free Neighborhoods Campaign in Old Town National City, explains that EHC combined internal research with the training of "promotoras de salud" (lay health promoters) who participated as both community researchers and advocates in local environmental health and land-use policy efforts.

Another important aspect of ECH's work involves building partnerships with other organizations that share EHC's ideology. In this way, the EHC aims to work on a local, state, national and international levels to address social and environmental issues.

=== Community-based participatory research ===
The Environmental Health Coalition participated in a community-based participatory research study that examined the effects of industrial activity in Old Town National City, California. The study observed links between community conditions and policy development, and supported efforts to increase the public awareness of environmental health risks in the specific area.

=== Work on National City ===
EHC has worked with residents of National City since at least 2005, especially in Old Town, on the city's west side. An important part of their efforts in this community have focused on improving food security in the area. According to EHC, the area is established as a food desert, which is defined as "part of the country vapid of fresh fruit, vegetables, and other healthy whole foods". Limited access to fresh food has been associated with increased risks of diet related health conditions. In all of San Diego, National City has the highest rate of heart attacks. Together with the EHC, the community has reached out to officials to establish a city garden to combat food insecurity within the city. The EHC intends to continue working with Old Town with the goal that they longer have food desert status.

Through community-based planning, EHC and Old Town residents developed a land-use plan that reflected residents' priorities for a healthier neighborhood. EHC's work in National City has also addressed the relationship between residential areas and industrial land uses. In 2025, KPBS and Voice of San Diego reported that the National City City Council unanimously rejected a proposed biofuel transfer station on the city's west side after opposition from residents and environmental groups, including EHC. The proposed project would have added truck and rail activity to an industrial area already affected by air pollution and heavy industry.

=== Barrio Logan ===
Barrio Logan is a neighborhood in San Diego that is concentrated with waste and recycling facilities, an interstate running through it, and an outdated city plan. Industrial land use conflicts in Barrio Logan played a large role in the emergence of environmental justice activism in San Diego. The EHC has worked with underserved communities such as Barrio Logan on environmental health and pollution issues. The community of Barrio Logan is in the process of notifying the local government of these issues with the help of the EHC. The Office of Environmental Health Hazard Assessment and the EPA developed a method of screening called CalEnviroScreen 3.0, and determined that Barrio Logan contains a disproportionate number of pollution sources. City planners and local government drafted a new plan, disregarding the community's ideas and inputs. The neighborhood voted against the city planners' version, so no resolution was reached, and the city plan from 1978 remains. They are still making an effort to gain momentum for their 2013 plan, and are still trying to reach a resolution.

=== Truck ordinance for Barrio Logan ===
In 2018, the EHC achieved its goal of cleaner air and public health in Barrio Logan by reducing the frequent heavy duty truck activity on local streets. Before the ordinance was unanimously passed, the residents of Barrio Logan dealt with excessive air and noise pollution. The residents of Boston Avenue in Barrio Logan participated in a traffic survey, which showed that up to 59 heavy duty vehicles drive down Boston Avenue in any given two-hour period.

The effort to reduce the effects caused by diesel-powered machines was led by David Alvarez, chair of the San Diego Environment Committee. Though the policy has been in effect for some time, it currently does not prohibit the use of diesel trucks on all streets. Some schools, retirement homes, and residential areas remain exposed to diesel related air pollutants such as ultrafine particulate matter. The EHC has advocated for the implementation of stricter penalties and enforcement of policy. They recommend a truck route as a solution to combat this issue.

=== Arroyo Alamar Preservation Initiative ===
The Arroyo Alamar river is a binational body of water that originates from Eastern San Diego County, and is one of Tijuana's last native wildlife hotspots. Human emissions have led to a decline in biodiversity, including the loss of habitats for waterfowl, mammals, marine life, amphibians, and crustaceans. The EHC has worked to preserve the land and prevent further construction and habitat destruction by hosting educational tours for the community in order to generate public awareness. The initiative also involves cross-border coordination with organizations in Tijuana and Mexican authorities in order to protect the Alamar riparian forest.

=== Transit for All ===
San Diego's transit system plays an important role for families, economy, health, and environment. However, many working families in San Diego County struggle to access job opportunities, visit doctors, and get groceries, due to the lack of accessibility in the current transit system. In the San Diego region, passenger and light-duty vehicles are the largest contributor of greenhouse gas emissions. Adding more transit systems can reduce this. The EHC and the San Diego Transportation Equity Working Group are working toward a more reliable and accessible transit system, while reducing greenhouse gas emission and lung-damaging air pollution. Along with these goals, it should meet the needs of individuals of any race and class, especially the low-income communities of color in Barrio Logan, City Heights, and National City. The MTS Board of Directors approved a plan to transition to 100% bus electrification by 2040. They are starting this plan by prioritizing having pollution-free buses in communities that have experienced the most impacts of greenhouses emissions.

=== 10 Transit Lifelines ===
The 10 Transit Lifelines is a San Diego County regional plan created by the EHC, with help from local residents of San Diego who organized and advocated for environmental justice to ensure healthier and more sustainable communities. The 10 Transit Lifelines describes the county's goals of reducing greenhouse gas emissions, decreasing lung-damaging air pollution, and meeting the needs of low-income communities of color. The plan is separated into ten categories.

- Transit Lifeline 1 focuses on environmental justice, promoting unlimited public transit access to all residents of San Diego.
- Transit Lifeline 2 describes investing in young people by implementing more youth programs that allow them to have better access to transportation.
- Transit Lifeline 3 focuses on improving bus frequency by having bus services every 10 minutes.
- Transit lifeline 4 introduces the Blue Line Express, a transit system that will operate 24 hours, allowing more access to the trolley and ensuring people arrive to their destinations on time.
- Transit lifeline 5 introduces 24-hour service for all public transit systems.
- Transit lifeline 6 describes a "purple line transit system" that connects from City Heights to Sorrento Valley, allowing communities to connect and helping to boost economic prosperity.
- Transit lifeline 7 introduces the goal of having an all-electric fleet by 2030 to help prevent further air pollution.
- Transit lifeline 8 focuses on anti-displacement strategies where rent is not regularly increased and more transit options are implemented.
- Transit Lifeline 9 focuses on having restroom access at San Diego's major transit stations.
- Transit lifeline 10 has a goal of establishing an emergency transit system, protecting residents living near hazardous sites. This would allow for easier evacuation in the event of a disaster.

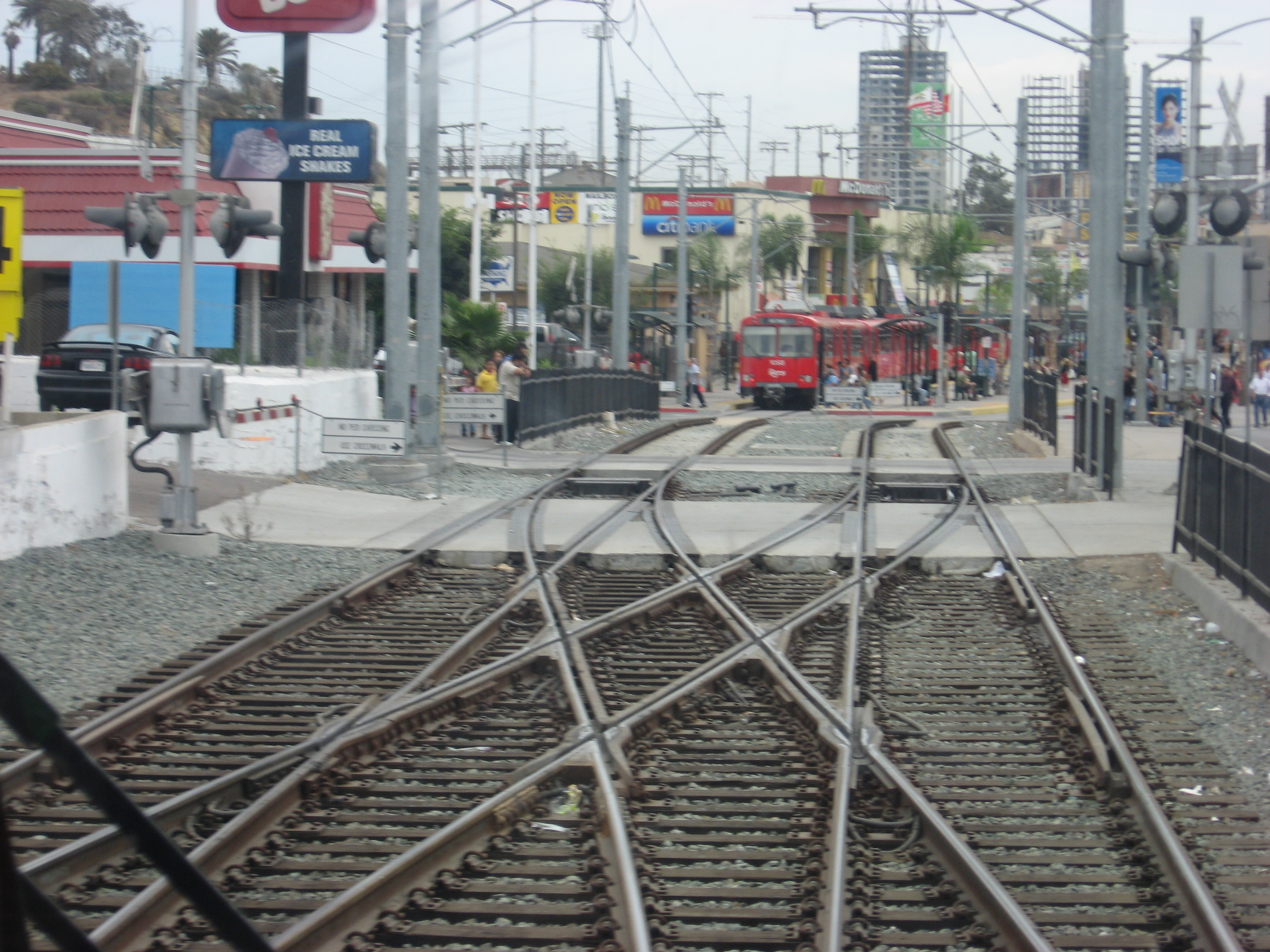
The Blue Line, a 26.3 mile trolley route connecting San Ysidro (border) to UTC via downtown San Diego

=== Microparticles in landscaping tool fumes ===
Many landscaping workers in California experience migraines that they accredit to exhaust from gas powered leaf blowers, lawn mowers, etc. While the state of California is strict about air quality regulations, some gas-powered machines remain unregulated. There appears to be little push from the government to strictly enforce clean air policies. There is little research on the subject. Some machines claim to be updated with more safety precautions, but still emit particles and gases that lead to health risks. The EPA states that pollution levels from these machines have the same risk risk to health as some sedans, and could be as detrimental as cars by 2020. Some of these machines emit particles smaller than 0.1 micron. Particles like these can cause cancer and lung disease, and are unregulated by the government. Masks for these particles and fumes are available but may not be accessible for workers in poor communities. In addition, some masks cannot filter out some contaninants like benzene. The EHC is currently assisting landscaping workers in bringing legislation to their local governments.

=== Lead pollution cleanup in San Diego schools ===
Lead pollution in schools is a common problem in San Diego County. Lead contamination has been identified in drinking water systems in some schools in San Diego City, especially in older facilities. Exposure to lead can result in long-term health risks, particularly in children. Individuals exposed to elevated levels of lead are at an increased risk for neurological and developmental problems, including learning and behavioral difficulties. Lead exposure sources in older houses can include paint, plumbing, and consumer products. The EHC and residents know lead to be prevalent, as most of the neighborhood's buildings were built before 1978. The EHC works with residents to investigate lead exposure concerns and provide information about potential health risks and testing options. They notify residents of medical risks, and inform recommended methods for lead detection.

=== Community-based home lead inspection project ===
San Diego County has a high emissions history. Most of the pollution comes from physical plants and cars. The city reported on its decreased emissions from the 1980s to the present. The tracked emissions do not include diesel because of monitoring differences, but the county still oversees over 3,000 facilities that emit some sort of air pollution. These include engine factories, auto body shops, dry cleaners, and gas stations. Higher-emitting facilities are required to send out reports on their emissions every two years to keep track of any changes. The State Office for Environmental Health Hazard Assessment also changed its standards to include women and young children. The county sends out notifications to residents in the case of emission changes, even if they are not currently detrimental.
