= Barrett Dam =

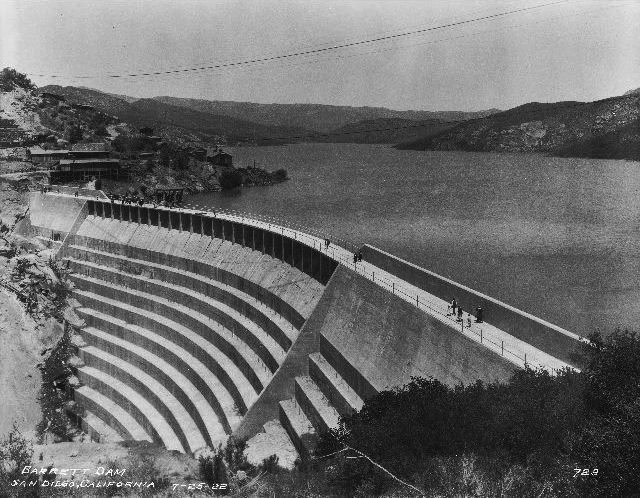
- Barrett Dam, seen nearly complete in 1922

- Location of Barrett Dam in California Barrett Dam (California) Barrett Dam (the United States)
- Country: United States
- Location: San Diego County, California
- Coordinates: 32°40′44″N 116°40′14″W
- Purpose: Water supply
- Construction began: 1921; 105 years ago
- Opening date: 1923; 103 years ago
- Owner: City of San Diego

Dam and spillways
- Type of dam: Concrete gravity arch
- Impounds: Cottonwood Creek
- Height: 171 ft (52 m)
- Length: 746 ft (227 m)

Reservoir
- Creates: Barrett Lake
- Total capacity: 34,206 acre⋅ft (42,192,000 m^{3})
- Catchment area: 252 mi^{2} (650 km^{2})
- Surface area: 891 acres (361 ha)

Barrett Dam is a concrete arch-gravity dam in southern San Diego County, California, United States, forming Barrett Lake on Cottonwood Creek. The dam is part of the city of San Diego's local water supply system.

== Overview and operations ==
Barrett Dam is located in a narrow canyon just below the confluence of Cottonwood Creek and Pine Valley Creek, about 35 miles (56 km) east of downtown San Diego. The dam is 171 feet (52 m) high above the riverbed and 746 feet (227 m) long, forming a reservoir with 34,206 acre-feet (42,192,000 m^{3}) of usable capacity. The dam contains 139,569 cubic yards (106,708 m^{3}) of concrete. The spillway is located on the face of the dam and is a stepped overflow structure controlled by gates. At maximum water levels the spillway capacity is approximately 87,500 cubic feet per second (2,480 m^{3}/s). To prevent flash floods from overtopping the dam, the gates are left open during the rainy season from November 1 to April 1.

The dam's primary purpose is to store water for diversion through the Dulzura Conduit, a 14-mile (23 km) long concrete aqueduct which transfers water from the Cottonwood Creek basin to Lower Otay Reservoir. Water is released into the Dulzura Conduit via an outlet tower and a 30-inch (76 cm) diameter pipe with a capacity of 271 cubic feet per second (7.7 m^{3}/s). Water stored at Lower Otay passes through the Otay Water Treatment Plant before entering the municipal system. Barrett is one of two dams on Cottonwood Creek, the other being Morena Dam 8 miles (13 km) upstream. Because Barrett is a deeper and narrower lake than Morena and experiences less evaporation, the city prioritizes water storage in Barrett. Water is moved downstream from Morena as long as storage space is available in Barrett. Resultantly, Barrett Lake is usually at a high level except during periods of extended drought.

== History ==
Before there was a reservoir, the area was a valley that has been homesteaded by George Barrett in the 1870s. The first dam at the Barrett site was a 20-foot (6.1 m) high concrete diversion dam built in the 1890s as part of the Cottonwood-Otay System by the Southern California Mountain Water Company. This dam's sole purpose was to feed the first Dulzura Conduit, a wooden flume that extended along the mountainside to the Lower Otay reservoir 12 miles (19 km) west. In 1913, the city of San Diego purchased this development for $2.5 million. Flooding in 1916 (ostensibly the work of the "rainmaker" Charles Hatfield) broke the dam at Lower Otay and overflowed the upstream Morena Dam, demonstrating the need for additional water storage capacity.

The city began construction on Barrett Dam in 1919, under the direction of engineer Hiram N. Savage. In December of that year, unusually heavy rainfall filled the reservoir behind the incomplete dam, very nearly causing its failure. Over the following few months, construction was hurried in order to keep up with the rising lake, which was only held back by wooden flashboards as the water level actually exceeded the height of the poured concrete for most of the construction period. Temporary sluiceways had to be maintained in order to drain excess water from the lake, which consistently threatened to overtop the dam. By the time the dam was completed in 1923 it was said that "the value of the water stored behind Barrett Dam by the time the structure was completed exceeded the entire cost of the dam".

== Recreation ==
In order to protect water quality, recreational access to Barrett Lake is extremely limited. The lake is open only Wednesdays, Saturdays and Sundays, and visitors are required to take reservations. Fishing is allowed on a strict catch-and-release basis.
