= Morena Dam =

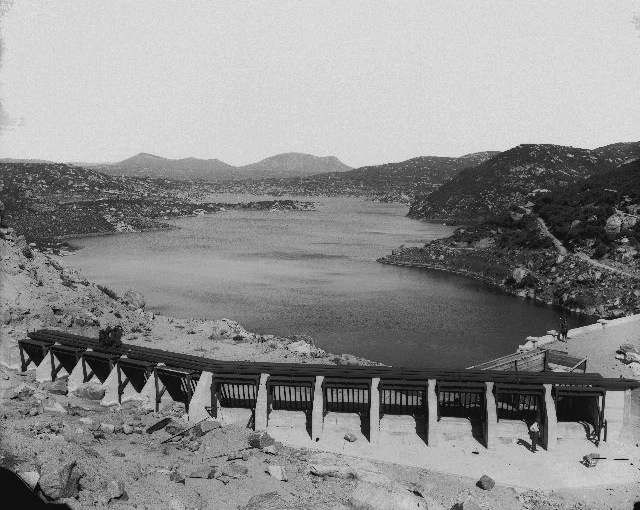
- View of Morena Reservoir from near the dam, looking upstream, c. 1918

- Location of Morena Dam in California
- Country: United States
- Location: San Diego County, California
- Coordinates: 32°41′07″N 116°32′51″W
- Purpose: Water supply
- Construction began: 1896; 130 years ago
- Opening date: 1912; 114 years ago
- Owner: City of San Diego

Dam and spillways
- Type of dam: Rockfill
- Impounds: Cottonwood Creek
- Height: 177 ft (54 m)
- Length: 550 ft (170 m)

Reservoir
- Creates: Morena Reservoir
- Total capacity: 50,694 acre⋅ft (62,530,000 m^{3})
- Catchment area: 114 mi^{2} (300 km^{2})
- Surface area: 1,475 acres (597 ha)
- Normal elevation: 3,039 ft (926 m) (spillway)

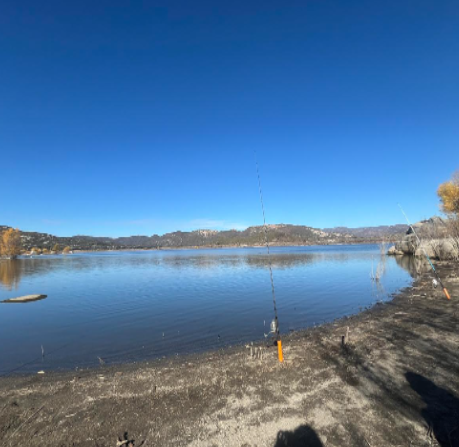
View of Lake Morena, California, December 2024.

Morena Dam is a rockfill dam across Cottonwood Creek, a tributary of the Tijuana River in southern San Diego County, California. Originally completed in 1912 and raised several times afterward, the dam is one of the oldest components of the city of San Diego's municipal water system, providing between 1,600 to 15,000 acre-feet (2,000,000 to 18,500,000 m^{3}) of water per year. It is one of the few facilities in the San Diego water supply system that relies entirely on local runoff.

There is a small lakeside settlement just east of Morena Reservoir called Morena Village. It makes up part of the census-designated place (CDP) of Campo.

== Dimensions ==
Morena Dam is located in the Cleveland National Forest at the headwaters of Cottonwood Creek, about 40 miles (64 km) east of downtown San Diego. The dam is 167 feet (51 m) high from the riverbed and 550 feet (170 m) long, with a height of 177 feet (54 m) from the foundations. Altogether the dam contains 335,300 cubic yards (256,400 m^{3}) of earth and rock fill. At its full height, the reservoir can hold 50,694 acre-feet (62,530,000 m^{3}) of water, covering 1,475 acres (597 ha). The drainage area above the dam is 114 square miles (300 km^{2}) and includes the tributary Morena Creek, for which the dam and reservoir are named.

Water is released via a 387-foot (118 m) long tunnel, fed by an intake tower that can draw up to 595 cubic feet per second (16.8 m^{3}/s) water from different elevations of the reservoir. The spillway is located on the north side of the dam and has a crest 310 feet (94 m) long, topping out at 3,039 feet (926 m) above sea level. Flood flows through the spillway are controlled by steel flash gates 7.5 feet (2.3 m) high. The spillway has a capacity of approximately 25,000 cubic feet per second (710 m^{3}/s).

== Usage ==
Morena Reservoir, also known as Lake Morena, serves primarily for long-term storage of winter flood flows in Cottonwood Creek, and is the uppermost of a chain of three reservoirs – Lower Otay, Barrett and Morena – that provide water to the city of San Diego. Water released from Morena Dam travels several miles down Cottonwood Creek to Barrett Lake, where it is diverted to Lower Otay via the 14-mile (23 km) long Dulzura Conduit. From Lower Otay Reservoir the water enters the Otay Water Treatment Plant, before flowing into the municipal water network. The entire project is known as the Cottonwood-Otay Water System.

Originally providing the city's main water supply, it was relegated to a secondary role after the city began importing water from the Colorado River in 1939. The reservoir now provides a backup water supply that is drawn down during dry years, when stored local water provides a much cheaper alternative than imported water – costing $240 per acre-foot whereas Colorado River water typically costs about $800 per acre-foot. On average, Morena provides only about 3 percent of the city's total supply.

As Morena Reservoir has a larger surface area and thus greater evaporative losses than Barrett Lake, the city generally prioritizes storage in Barrett. Water is moved downstream from Morena as often as possible, if storage space is available in the lower reservoir. In addition, the watershed above Morena generally does not produce enough runoff to fill the reservoir, except in very wet years. Inflows average 10,218 acre-feet (12,604,000 m^{3}) per year, or barely a fifth of the storage capacity. As a result, Morena only reaches spillway level about once per decade.

== History ==
The dam was first proposed in the 1880s by the Southern California Mountain Water Company, which envisioned a system of reservoirs and connecting pipelines to transport water from the Tijuana and Otay river basins to San Diego. A bond issue was approved in 1896 for construction of Morena Dam, which would form the highest and most remote of the reservoirs. Construction began in fall 1896, directed by San Diego city engineer Edwin Capps. The initial construction was fraught with problems caused by leakage and poor engineering, and work stopped in April 1898. It was not until May 1909 when construction resumed, under engineer Michael O'Shaughnessy. The job was finally finished in 1912, at a cost of about $1.5 million.

The city of San Diego purchased the dam from Mountain Water Company in 1914. Since then, it has been raised several times to increase its capacity – 5 feet (1.5 m) in 1917, 10 feet (3.0 m) in 1923, 4 feet (1.2 m) in 1930 and 2 feet (0.61 m) in 1946. The spillway was rebuilt and widened in 1946 to increase its safety margin in floods.

Because the dam was built in a high mountain area with some of the highest annual rainfall in San Diego County, it was anticipated that its reservoir would fill every year. However, the early 1900s saw continuous drought conditions in Southern California, and the reservoir did not fill to more than a third of its capacity in the first few years of operations. It was not until 1916 (see below) when Morena reached capacity for the first time.

=== The "Rainmaker" ===
In 1916, the city of San Diego hired Charles Hatfield, a man known as the "Rainmaker", who had offered to fill Morena Reservoir at a cost of $10,000. Although the city council doubted his ability, Hatfield was hired and set to work "rainmaking" on January 1. By January 10, flooding rains began to fall throughout San Diego County. Rising at a peak rate of two feet (0.6 m) per hour, Morena Reservoir filled and spilled on January 26, a mere 5 inches (13 cm) from the top of the dam. In the rest of the county, flooding washed out bridges, inundated neighborhoods and killed over 50 people. The city subsequently deemed the rains an "act of God" and determined that if Hatfield were to collect the fee for filling Morena reservoir he would also have to pay for the damages caused by the rains. Hatfield never took the money.
