= Tecate Creek =

Creek in California and Baja California

Coordinates: 32°34′01″N 116°45′57″W

Tecate Creek is a stream in northern Baja California, Mexico, with its headwaters in southern San Diego County, California, United States. It begins along the Tecate Divide in the In-Ko-Pah Mountains, near Live Oak Springs. The upper reaches of the stream in the US are known as Campo Creek. It flows southwest, crossing the Mexico–United States border at Canyon City, before flowing through the city of Tecate, Baja California. West of Tecate it flows through a gorge and briefly re-enters the US where it combines with Cottonwood Creek to form the Rio Alamar, a tributary of the Tijuana River which it joins in central Tijuana.

The portion of Tecate Creek in Mexico is about 29.9 kilometres (18.6 mi) long. Combined with Campo Creek in the US, it is 57.5 kilometres (35.7 mi), making it one of the longest tributaries of the Tijuana River.

The Tecate brewery is built on the banks of the stream.

== See also ==
- List of rivers of Mexico
