= Cottonwood Creek (San Diego County) =

Tijuana River tributary in southern California

- Location of Cottonwood Creek in California

Location
- Country: United States
- State: California

Physical characteristics
- Source: Laguna Mountains
  - location: Cleveland National Forest
  - coordinates: 32°49′56″N 116°27′57″W
  - elevation: 5,406 ft (1,648 m)
- Mouth: Rio Alamar
  - location: About 15 mi (24 km) east of Tijuana
  - coordinates: 32°34′02″N 116°45′55″W
  - elevation: 558 ft (170 m)
- Length: 36 mi (58 km)
- Basin size: 310 sq mi (800 km^{2})
- Discharge
  - location: near Dulzura
  - average: 15.2 cu ft/s (0.43 m^{3}/s)
  - minimum: 0 cu ft/s (0 m^{3}/s)
  - maximum: 11,700 cu ft/s (330 m^{3}/s)

Cottonwood Creek is a major stream, about 36 miles (58 km) long, in southern San Diego County, California. It is part of the Tijuana River drainage basin.

The creek begins in the Laguna Mountains, in the Cleveland National Forest near Pine Valley. It flows south through the Cottonwood Valley into Lake Morena, which is formed by Morena Dam. Below the dam it turns west, flowing through a narrow gorge to Barrett Lake, created by Barrett Dam. From there it turns south, passing Barrett Junction, before joining with Tecate Creek to form the Rio Alamar, a tributary of the Tijuana River. The confluence of the two streams is located only about 200 yards (180 m) north of the United States–Mexico border. Both Tecate Creek and the Alamar are located mostly in Mexico.

Both Morena and Barrett Reservoirs are part of the San Diego, California, municipal water supply system. Water travels from Cottonwood Creek via the Dulzura Conduit to Lower Otay Reservoir. Cottonwood Creek provides only a small fraction of San Diego's water supply, which mainly depends on imported Colorado River water.

== See also ==
- List of rivers of California
