= Charles Hatfield =

American cloud seeder (1875–1958)

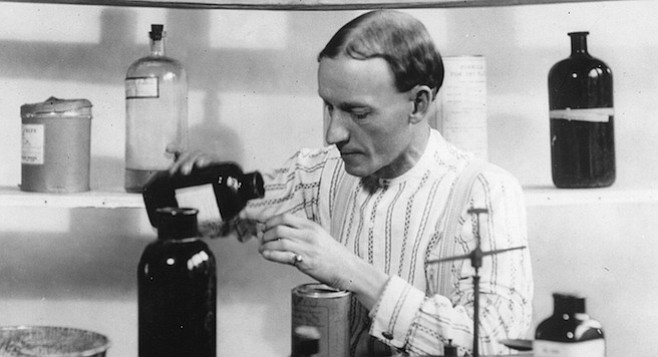
- Hatfield in 1922.
- Born: 15 July 1875; Fort Scott
- Died: 12 January 1958
- Occupations: "Rainmaker", sewing machine salesman

Charles Mallory Hatfield (July 15, 1875 – January 12, 1958) was an American "rainmaker".

== Early life ==
Hatfield was born in Fort Scott, Kansas, on July 15, 1875. His father, Stephen, a property speculator, moved the family to Southern California in 1886, settling first in San Diego, where Hatfield Sr built three houses. He later built a home on a forty-acre ranch and olive grove at Gopher Canyon near Bonsall, forty miles north of the city. As an adult, Charles became a salesman for the New Home Sewing Machine Company. In 1904, he moved to Glendale, California.

== Career ==
As a young man growing up in Bonsall, Hatfield studied pluviculture and began to develop his own methods for producing rain, inspired by the way a boiling kettle attracted the water vapour rising from an adjacent, steaming pan on his mother's stove. By 1902 he had created a secret mixture of 23 chemicals in large galvanized evaporating tanks that, he claimed, attracted rain. Hatfield called himself a "moisture accelerator".

In 1904, promoter Fred Binney began a public relations campaign for Hatfield. A number of Los Angeles ranchers saw his ads in newspapers and promised Hatfield $50 to produce rain. In February, Hatfield and his brother Paul built an evaporating tower at La Crescenta where Hatfield released his mixture into the air. Hatfield's attempt was apparently successful, so the ranchers paid him $100. Contemporary weather bureau reports described the rain as a small part of a storm that was already coming, but Hatfield's supporters disregarded this.

Hatfield began to receive more job offers. He promised Los Angeles 18 inches (46 cm) of rain, apparently succeeded, and collected a fee of $1000. For this effort, Hatfield had built his tower on the grounds of the Esperanza Sanitarium in Altadena, near Rubio Canyon.

In 1906, Hatfield was invited to the Yukon Territory, where he agreed to create rain for the water-dependent mines of the Klondike goldfields. The Klondike contract was for $10,000, but after unsuccessful efforts, Hatfield slipped away, collecting only $1,100 for expenses. This failure did not deter his supporters.

In 1915, the San Diego City Council, pressured by the San Diego Wide Awake Improvement Club, approached Hatfield to produce rain to fill the reservoir of Morena Dam. Hatfield offered to produce rain for free, then charge $1,000 per inch ($393.7 per centimetre) for between forty and fifty inches (1.0 and 1.3 m) and free again over fifty inches (1.3 m). The council voted four to one for a $10,000 fee, payable when the reservoir was filled. A formal agreement was never drawn up, though Hatfield continued based on verbal understanding. Hatfield, with his brother, built a tower beside Lake Morena and was ready early in the New Year.

On January 5, 1916, heavy rain began—and grew gradually heavier day by day. Dry riverbeds filled to the point of flooding. Worsening floods destroyed bridges, marooned trains and cut phone cables - not to mention flooding homes and farms. Two dams, Sweetwater Dam and one at Lower Otay Lake, overflowed. Rain stopped on 20 January but resumed two days later. On January 27 Lower Otay Dam broke, increasing the devastation and reportedly causing about 20 deaths (accounts vary on the exact number).

Hatfield talked to the press on February 4 and said that the damage was not his fault and that the city should have taken adequate precautions. Hatfield had fulfilled the requirements of his contract—filling the reservoir—but the city council refused to pay the money unless Hatfield would accept liability for damages; there were already claims worth $3.5 million. Besides, there was no written contract. Hatfield tried to settle for $4000 and then sued the council. The suit continued until 1938 when two courts decided that the rain was an act of God, which absolved him of any wrongdoing, but also meant Hatfield did not get his fee.

Hatfield's fame only grew and he received more contracts for rainmaking. Among other things, in 1929 he was hired by the Standard Steamship and Fruit Company of New Orleans to stop a fire on a 100,000 acre banana plantation in Honduras Later the Bear Valley Mutual Water Company wanted to fill Big Bear Lake. However, during the Great Depression he had to return to his work as a sewing machine salesman. His wife Mable divorced him in 1931, claiming in the divorce settlement that Hatfield had hidden some of his earnings from her.

Charles Hatfield died January 12, 1958, and took his chemical formula with him to his grave in Forest Lawn Memorial Park in Glendale, California.

Hatfield claimed at least 500 successes. According to later commentators and those who encountered him, Hatfield's successes were mainly due to his meteorological skill, detailed study of rainfall statistics and innate sense of timing, selecting periods where there was a high probability of rain anyway. John L. Bacon, a mayor of San Diego who studied Hatfield's so-called successes, regarded him as nothing more than "a darned good weather prophet."

== References in popular culture ==
Charles Hatfield and the 1916 flooding at Lake Morena is the subject of the song "Hatfield" by the band Widespread Panic. Singer/guitarist John Bell wrote the song after reading the story of the rainmaker in a Farmers' Almanac. The song was released on the album Everyday in 1993.

Charles Hatfield and the San Diego flood is credited as the inspiration for the instrumental musical piece "The Rainmaker" from the album Innovators released in 1993 by Sam Cordon and Kurt Bestor.

Hatfield's story inspired the 1956 Burt Lancaster film The Rainmaker, based on the play of the same name. Hollywood invited Hatfield to the premiere. The play also became the basis of a Broadway Musical, 110 in the Shade.

In T. Jefferson Parker's 2007 novel Storm Runners, Charles Hatfield's fictional great-great-granddaughter takes up his research.

Charles Hatfield and the San Diego flood was featured in a 2016 episode of the White Rabbit Project on Netflix.

Charles Hatfield and his rainmaking endeavors are mentioned in Chapter One of Mark Arax's 2019 book, "The Dreamt Land."

Charles Hatfield and the San Diego flood is the subject of The Wizard of Sun City: The Strange, True Story of Charles Hatfield, The Rainmaker Who Drowned a City's Dreams by Garry Jenkins.

== See also ==
- Cloud seeding
