= Rio Alamar =

River in Baja California, Mexico

Coordinates: 32°30′56″N 116°58′22″W

The Tijuana River Basin showing the basin of the Rio Alamar

The Rio Alamar or the Arroyo de Alamar is a river mainly in northern Baja California, Mexico, with a small portion in California, United States. The riparian corridor that is the Alamar has a wooded area home to: riparian, aquatic and migratory birds, abundant species of fish, and amphibians. The wildlife and natural vegetation in the Arroyo Alamar was historically a vital resource for fishing, bathing, and even drinking. The stream is formed by the confluence of Cottonwood Creek and Tecate Creek a short distance north of the Mexico–United States border. It flows generally west for about 25 kilometres (16 mi) through the San Ysidro Mountains and the Tijuana urban area before joining with the Arroyo de las Palmas in central Tijuana, to form the Tijuana River. The Rio Alamar tributary makes up almost one third of the larger bi-national Tijuana River Watershed that spans approximately 1,750 square miles and impacts the lives of more than 1.4 million people. The major tributary as part of the Tijuana River Estuary has been deemed one of the 21 wetlands of international importance by the RAMSAR Convention.

The Rio Alamar and the Tijuana River's Watershed is threatened by pollution and is the site of active rehabilitation and environmental justice efforts that are combined with urban planning in this region. The lack of proper planning and regulation that contaminated the flood plain has also induced binational collaborations due to the close proximity of the Arroyo to the United States. The pollution and the environmental injustices that threaten the Rio Alamar are a result of many long-standing and deep-rooted factors including: transnational and national policies, prioritizing profit-based land use processes, industrial pollution, underdeveloped urban infrastructure in Tijuana, exponential population growth and migration, and stark division created by the U.S.-Mexico border.The stream is formed by the confluence of Cottonwood Creek and Tecate Creek a short distance north of the Mexico–United States border. It flows generally west for about 25 kilometres (16 mi) through the San Ysidro Mountains and the Tijuana urban area before joining with the Arroyo de las Palmas in central Tijuana, to form the Tijuana River.

== Environmental impacts of land use development ==
The environment of the Arroyo Alamar and surrounding regions has been impacted by its transformation into a North American Free Trade Agreement (NAFTA)-inspired export processing zone. The significant tax breaks, lack of environmental regulations, and the inexpensive Mexican workforce allured maquiladoras to the river's region by the end of the 20th century. Rapid development made the site one of the largest NAFTA-established industrial parks along the U.S.-Mexico border. The river's benefits to community health and empowerment were ignored by maquiladoras which perceived the resource as a "pollution haven". Illegally dumped waste, raw sewage, trash, and dirty runoff in addition to air contamination ensued in the context of Tijuana's inadequate urban infrastructure and absence of enforcing environmental policy. Many of the 45,000 residents in the wooded area between the Arroyo Alamar and the Otay industrial park still work at the maquiladoras and report runoff contamination crossing the streets. Along with ecological damage, the population of this region suffers from environmental health risks and inadequate infrastructure and social services. Industrial outputs of wastewater and air smog that jeopardized the river and its watershed also prompted a lack of clean water access, deteriorating water quality, soil contamination, and health hazards.

Prioritizing the siting of maquiladoras over critical basic facilities in Tijuana's land use development has led to the environmental degradation for both ecosystems and residents. Besides maquiladoras, other constructions include: recycling centers, manufacturing plants, traffic routes, and other polluting industries. The affluent household and industrial waste that runs downhill disproportionately exposes the Arroyo community. Inequitable waves of construction and zoning have created access gaps in amenities, parks, walkable sidewalks, and other green spaces in the Arroyo region. 37 abandoned lots without garbage pickup are current trash dumping sites where discarded tires, auto-body panels, scraps, junk, and trash surround Alamar Zone. The industrial activity hotspot and its population of 39, 217 are serviced by only 8 parks and no libraries. The families that inhabit the Alamar had also benefited from the riparian habitat of the river floodplain before its biodiversity, water supply, and water quality became damaged.

The hydrologic conditions and flooding behaviors of the Alamar stream were analyzed by the Mexican federal agency Comisión Nacional del Agua (CONAGUA) for the first time in 1993. Supported on the bases of such studies the hydroecological channelization of the Arroyo Alamar was proposed by the XVI Tijuana City Council through the city's urban planning agency IMPLAN. IMPLAN prepared the "Alamar Rehabilitation Project" based on the proposal, which laid the foundation for planning a linear park. The preliminary land-use plan included the preservation and conservation of the waterbody's hydroecological functions, natural characteristics, and flora and fauna. The maintenance of aquifer recharge, replenishment of groundwater, improvement of water quality, recreation, landscaping, a green corridor, and flood prevention and mitigation were urban-planning needs also included. These environmental services are crucial for sustaining water consumption of the settled communities within their 10.5 km section.

Binational hydrological and hydrecological studies were conducted to analyze the importance of preservation and conservation of the Arroyo. High toxicity testing costs in the context of inadequate social service allocations made such transborder collaborations critical. Some studies include: “Flood Hydrology of the Binational Cottonwood Creek-Arroyo Alamar, California and Baja California” (2001) and "Hydroecological Characterization of Arroyo Alamar, Tijuana, Baja California, Mexico" (2004) carried out by the Southwest Consortium for Environmental Research and Policy (SCERP) and “The Alamar River Corridor; an Urban River Park Oasis in Tijuana, Baja California, México”(2001) carried out by the Institute for Regional Studies of the Californias. They determined design flood magnitudes, applicable stream zoning restrictions, and other eco-friendly channel properties.

The state of Baja California published general guidelines for land use in the Alamar area within the population of the city in 2002. The needs for land use control and administration in the Arroyo in the absence of an approved partial development program was supported in the government guidelines. The municipality of Tijuana became further alert about the Arroyo due to the recorded heavy rainfall in February 2004 . Civil protection authorities have now classified the Alamar as susceptible to flooding due to mud flow and fast avenues. Inter-institutional coordination of Civil Protection was necessary for evicting the more than 250 threatened families residing within the channel of the Arroyo stream. Civil protection authorities have now classified the Alamar as susceptible to flooding due to mud flow and fast avenues.

CONAGUA proceeded to request an agreement with the municipality that granted the federal agency the custody, conservation and maintenance over the administration of the channel and federal zone of the Arroyo Alamar. The state government would later monitor urban infrastructure work related to the area when the agreement was annulled.

Supported on such events the project "Sustainable Architecture of Arroyo Alamar, Tijuana, Baja California, Mexico'" (2005) proposed a conceptual design of a linear park. The SCERP linear park proposal sought to mitigate flooding risks, protect the stream's aquifer recharge processes, and reduce environmental impacts to the riparian and inhabited landscape. By the fall of 2007 the Otay Mesa Binational Corridor Strategic Plan was drawn up and approved by the San Diego Association Board of Directors and the XVIII City Council of the City of Tijuana. Uniting the ''"Binational Vision of the Basin of the Tijuana River" and the Border 2012 programs for the creation of conservation areas particularly in the Arroyo Alamar were established recommendations within the environmental category of the identified strategies. MPLAN was then charged to carry out an Environmental Impact Study for the nearly ratified eco-friendly channelization design.The Arroyo restoration project with sustainable river architecture was finally signed off by municipal subcommittees in 2009. The project had planned restoration, recreation spaces, and permeable side walls and bottoms well-suited for natural filtration. Such sustainable urban development process in the Arroyo aimed to rehabilitate flood plains and preserve riparian-habitat functions while in tune with primary flood-mitigation and aquifer-replenishment.

A sudden change of direction from an ecologically sound channelization approach occurred when the state of Baja California released a new environmental report that opted for no restoration and concrete channelization. The greenbelts, trees, parks, and basketball court included in the more expensive eco-friendly Arroyo project were also removed. Concrete channelization alone risks habitat destruction, species endangerment, loss of surface and groundwater, increased erosion, magnified pollution concentrations, and aggravated local flood events. The concrete channelization approach for developing urban planning in the Arroyo instead made more money for the city and state. Against environmental, binational, and community wishes eco-channelization was abandoned and concrete construction began in 2011.

CONAGUA tendered 550 million pesos [over $4.1 million] to a consortium of construction companies for the concrete channelization with full consent of the Baja California governments. The choice of contractor in the deal was met with protest since the Baja-based company called Ark of the Pacific had pending lawsuits in regards to work quality and defects. CONAGUA has also been criticized for obscuring local resident and concerns and restricting local and state influence on federal policy. Two-thirds of the concrete channelization has ensued under the claims of reduced flooding and deterring illegal development along the river.

The Arroyo Alamar experienced additional money-oriented land access struggles when concrete channelization replaced the prior eco-channelization plan. Government land in the Arroyo became invaded and resold under the claim of viable real estate development when the riverbed was filled with trash. Investors and developers dumped and paid for trash load dumping since it sanctioned the land ownership claims. The profitable business further contaminated the environment and made city-approved rehabilitation efforts more difficult. A superhighway along the channel with alleged economic opportunity and improved infrastructure is also expected to increase land value by 20-fold when developed.

=== Environmental justice efforts and benefits ===
The Alamar Zone has been the site of active environmental justice, conservation, and land use community development planning efforts for nearly two decades. Various neighborhoods located within the Arroyo Alamar united with representatives from Tijuana's Human Rights office in November 2005 to advocate for the health risks of inhabitants associated with environmental contamination of the stream. The citizen movement brought attention to the recorded cases of lupus, anencephaly, and gastrointestinal disorders in the Arroyo region that resulted from industrial contamination and a lack of basic services. Alleviating the environmental and social grievances of affected communities in the Arroyo requires community participation and procedural justice in the region's environmental governance. As such, having a 'place at the table' of the decision-making processes of IMPLAN's management plan for the Arroyo became the center of environmental justice efforts. Addressing environmental and health risks along the Arroyo through inclusive environmental governance fostered both local and binational collaborations. Given the background of hydrological and hydroecological studies of the Arroyo Alamar the concept of sustainable river architecture in the urban planning project has also been especially significant.

A sociopolitical perspective on the urban and environmental management in the Arroyo and beyond characterizes three elements: participation of citizens and organized society, coordination between three levels of government, and sectors that impact the project. The implementation of free-trade agreements within NAFTA created a new strained the intricate dynamics of environmental governance that influence the Arroyo, exerted additional pressure on the resources of the nation-state, and exacerbated socio-economic disparities. As a result, the overburdened structures of environmental and social governance of the region did not have the mechanisms for enforcing sufficient outreach to its disadvantaged communities. The programmatic scope of Tijuana's municipality has frequently been unable to create meaningful relationships with marginalized populations. Minimal participation from a lack of capacity-building efforts meant key missing community members went unrecognized as needed stakeholders in Arroyo decision-making process. Key impediments to community participation in governance have been: lack of time, knowledge, funding, political influence, and impact perceptions. Another structural barrier is the high opportunity costs faced by marginalized groups from the time-space constraints of meeting everyday needs.

Environmental capacity building for local communities requires taking into consideration participation barriers and ensuring outreach strategies consult even those lacking cultural, social, and political capital. Meaningful consultation under bottom-up and procedurally just governance values local knowledge in the deliberation processes that impact their environment. Actively promoting authentic and inclusive dialogue ensures the material and ideological foundations of a project, such as direction, scope, or operations, can be traced back to the influence of community input. The built-in accountability process of procedural just approaches to governance closes participation gaps and recognizes local concerns and priorities. Creating policy solutions with a greater diversity of stakeholders also leads to better informed and shared agreements, actions, and outcomes. Increasing community participation in decision-making can also support effective policy implementation that leads to better environmental outcomes.

A procedurally just approach for the region's urban and environmental governance has been at the forefront of environmental justice efforts. This is because materializing urban and environmental actions in the area with an inclusive governance framework strives to harmonize hydroecological law, societal benefit, and financial interests. Civil society organizations such as the Environmental Health Coalition, Chilpancingo Collective for Environmental Justice, Tijuana Quality of Life, RECIMEC, the Border Environmental Education Project and others requested an injunction for the suspension of the works of channeling the Alamar stream in 2012. This request, in joint with inhabitants of the area, was a search of a more environmentally friendly and sustainable alternative. Condition failures led to the suspension of the Third Stage modification work of the concrete channelization of the Arroyo that same year. From that point onward, binational and local collaborations developed an integrated approach to governance in IMPLAN's resource management plan for the Arroyo.

Work meetings between dependencies of the three levels governments and such civil societies were regularly held to reach agreements regarding a hydroecological approach for continuing the Third Stage. The opinions and proposals put forth by various stakeholders throughout the process carried out during the Arroyo Alamar Technical Board's (MTAA) work established a strong foundation of citizen participation in defining the area for environmental protection and restoration. This highlighted the sense of ownership among citizens and shed light on the necessity and significance of preserving spaces and ecosystems.

On November 23, 2014, as a follow-up to the collaborative meetings between the government and society, the formal establishment of the "Mesa Técnica del Arroyo Alamar (MTAA)" took place. This platform served as a space for participation, analysis of information, and coordination among the actors involved. Its objective was to reach a consensus on the project for the completion of the Arroyo el Alamar channeling, bringing together the efforts of all stakeholders. On December 10 the MTAA formally collaborated with CONAGUA and the Government of the State of Baja California. CONAGUA committed to providing 160 million pesos, while the State Government pledged 40 million pesos for this purpose. Subsequently, on July 6, 2015, an Eco-hydrological Project proposal for the Third Stage of the "Arroyo Alamar" was submitted to CONAGUA's offices in Tijuana.

Another mechanism for community participation in the urban planning process for the Arroyo were collaborative and community-based mapping projects. One significant case was the 'Mapping Project for the Alamar Zone' (Mapeo Comunitario de la Zona Alamar) in initiative between the Colectivo Salud y Justicia Ambiental and Red de Ciudadanos por el Mejoramiento de las Comunidades (RECIMEC) in 2015. Its purpose was to facilitate community engagement in the urban planning process of the Arroyo in Tijuana. The project data had a profound influence on the land use planning process as it pinpointed crucial environmental risks and valuable assets to prioritize in the zoning decisions. Connections between residents and IMPLAN government representatives were also established with the normative and epistemological contributions of local concerns and priorities. In such case the fusing of government-citizen relationships and knowledge exchange proved to empower community confidence, favorable land use decisions, and the protection of health and nature.

Community participation in the urban planning processes of the Arroyo has demonstrated to be a valuable contribution to the domains of environmental justice. An increase of citizen support and political will additionally promotes reconciling the socioeconomic role and relationship of the Arroyo Alamar to urban society. This is significant for creating short and long term environmental justice solutions to protect community health, enhance quality of life, upgrade urban infrastructure, and mitigate impacts from industrial processes in the Arroyo.

The Civil Association Collective Chilpancingo Pro-Justicia Ambiental, supported by the Environmental Health Coalition and other civil society organizations in MTAA initiated negotiations again in 2016. The necessary work for the development of a technical study for the Arroyo was undertaken by both actors involved. The study served as the first step towards formally managing the declaration of the recognized area in the stream for riparian forest conservation purposes.Throughout 2018 and early 2019, the Colectivo Salud y Justicia Civil Association Environmental A.C. (formerly known as the Chilpancingo pro Justicia Ambiental collective) continued their efforts from previous work and studies. They held meetings with the Directors of IMPLAN to secure the required support for the preparation of the declaration of the conservation area of the Alamar stream.

During 2020, the Colectivo Salud y Justicia Ambiental A.C. organized meetings and conducted field trips in the stream area, engaging with Councilors and directors from IMPLAN and the Municipal Directorate for Environmental Protection. In October 2020, a working technical group was established through IMPLAN to advance the declaration process and ensure its completion, approval, and subsequent publication following the applicable procedures. A total of twenty meetings, both online and in-person, were conducted throughout 2020–2021. Civil society organizations, members from the H.XVIII Tijuana City Council, the Environmental Protection Department, and IMPLAN were involved to coordinate and facilitate the management of various aspects related to the declaration.

== See also ==
- List of rivers of Mexico
