= OHS =

OHS may refer to:

== Medicine ==
- Obesity hypoventilation syndrome
- Occipital horn syndrome

== Other ==
- Occupational health and safety
- Occupational Health Science, a scholarly journal published by the Society for Occupational Health Psychology
- Oh's, a brand of cereals
- Oracle HTTP Server
- Over head system, a power supply scheme for bumper cars

== Organizations ==
- Ochsner Health System
- Office of Homeland Security, Office of the Executive Branch of the United States, precursor to the Department of Homeland Security
- Ohio Historical Society
- Oklahoma Historical Society
- Ontario Handweavers & Spinners
- Oregon Historical Society
- Oregon Humane, formerly known as the Oregon Humane Society
- Organ Historical Society, in Villanova, Pennsylvania, United States
- Ottawa Humane Society
- Oxford Harmonic Society

== High schools ==
Various countries

- Orange High School (disambiguation), various schools of this name
- Olympic High School (disambiguation), various schools of this name

Canada

- Oromocto High School, in Oromocto, New Brunswick

New Zealand

- Onehunga High School, in Auckland

United Kingdom

- Oriel High School, in Crawley, West Sussex, England
- Oxford High School, in Oxford, Oxfordshire, England

United States

- Oakland High School, in Oakland, California
- Oakmont High School, in Antelope, California
- Oakton High School, in Vienna, Virginia
- Oceanside High School, in Oceanside, California
- Odessa High School (New York), in Odessa, New York
- Odessa High School, in Odessa, Texas
- Odessa High School (Washington), in Odessa, Washington
- Ogden High School (Utah), in Ogden, Utah
- Olympian High School, in San Diego County, California
- Olympic High School, in Charlotte, North Carolina
- Opelika High School, in Opelika, Alabama
- Orem High School, in Orem, Utah
- Orion High School, in Orion, Illinois
- Osborne High School, in Marietta, Georgia
- Ottawa Senior High School, in Ottawa, Kansas
- Ottumwa High School, in Ottumwa, Iowa
- Stanford Online High School, online school based in Redwood City, California
- Oswego High School, in Oswego Illinois
- Oswego High School, in Oswego, New York
- Overland High School, in Aurora, Colorado
