= Isalys Quiñones =

Puerto Rican basketball player (born 1997)

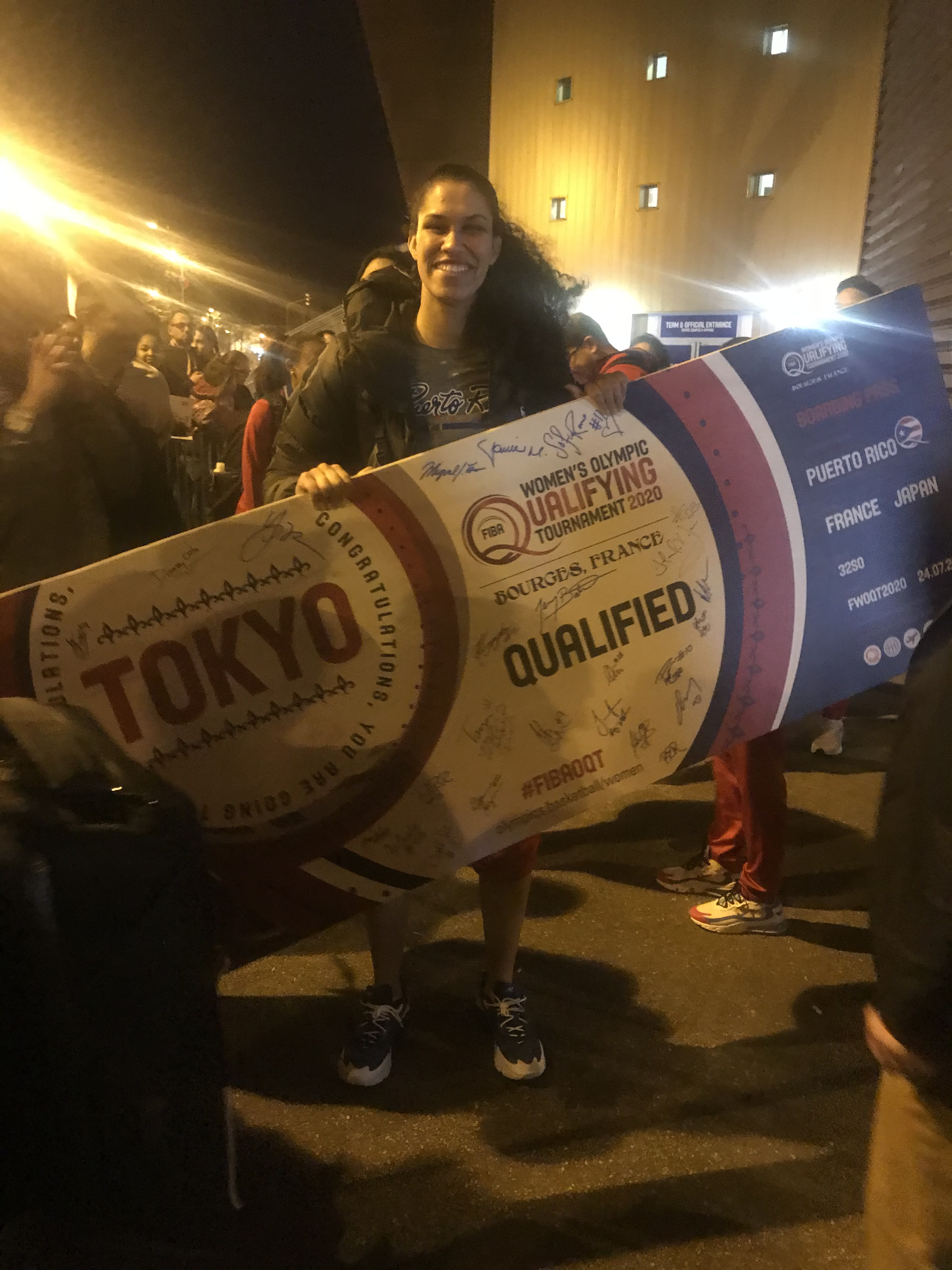

No. 25 – PAOK
- Position: Center

Personal information
- Born: October 23, 1997 (age 29) Monterey, California, U.S.
- Listed height: 6 ft 3 in (1.91 m)

Career information
- High school: Otay Ranch (Chula Vista, California)
- College: Dartmouth (2015–2019)
- Playing career: 2020–present

Career history
- 2020–2021: Dafni Agiou Dimitriou
- 2021: Tarbes GB
- 2021–: PAOK
Medals
Women's basketball
Representing Puerto Rico
FIBA Women's AmeriCup
Silver medal – second place	2021 San Juan
Bronze medal – third place	2017 Buenos Aires
Pan American Games
Bronze medal – third place	2019 Lima	Team
Central American and Caribbean Games
Bronze medal – third place	2018 Barranquilla	Team
Centrobasket
Gold medal – first place	2021 San Salvador
Gold medal – first place	2018 Manatí
Bronze medal – third place	2017 St. Thomas

Isalys Briana Quiñones (born October 23, 1997) is a Puerto Rican basketball player. She played college basketball for Dartmouth from 2015 to 2019. She represents the senior Puerto Rican national team in international national team competitions.

She participated in the 2018 FIBA Women's Basketball World Cup and the Tokyo 2020 Olympics.

== Early life ==
The daughter of a county employee and a retired Naval officer, Quiñones inherited her height from her father who is 6 ft 3 in (1.91 m). She started playing basketball at the age of five at the South Bay YMCA. By the time she was in sixth grade, she was the tallest in her class, contributing to unwelcome bullying. Nonetheless, her height was key to Joseph Casillas Elementary Lady Comets basketball team winning the first ever championship in 2007. As captain, she led the team to three championships in a row. On June 9, 2009, Joseph Casillas Elementary School retired her number 25 jersey in all sports.

== High school career ==
Quiñones attended Otay Ranch High School in Chula Vista, California, where she was a four-year starter on the girls' varsity basketball team. She recorded 1,289 total points (11.7 PPG), 930 rebounds (8.5 RPG), 45% in 2-pt Field Goals, 23% in 3-pt Field Goals, 70% free throws, 246 steals, 207 blocks, 176 assists, 32 Double-Doubles and one Triple-Double (11 points, 17 rebounds and 11 blocks). As a freshman (2011–2012), she started every game averaging 7.6 points and 5.9 rebounds per game.

As a sophomore (2012–2013), Quiñones averaged 12.2 points and 8.2 rebounds per game, recorded five double-doubles and helped the team to a 19–9 record while elevating the team to the first playoffs appearance in school history. In December 2013, she was highlighted by The San Diego Union Tribune as 2012-2013 girls basketball players to watch.

Quiñones flourished by her junior year (2013–2014). As team co-captain, she averaged 17.9 points and 11.7 rebounds per game and recorded 18 double-doubles. On December 21, 2013, she recorded 27 points, 14 rebounds, and 3 blocks against Morse High School. On January 21, 2014, Quiñones tallied 18 points and 18 rebounds against San Diego High School. On January 25, she put up 25 points, 17 rebounds, and six blocks in a rivalry game against Olympian High School. Otay Ranch defeated Olympian for the first time in school history in overtime, by a score of 66–63. On February 5, she recorded 37 points and 25 rebounds against Bonita Vista High School. She was recognized by The Mighty 1090 as Female Athlete of the Week. On February 11, she was named The San Diego Union Tribune Athlete of the Week. On February 15, she put up 31 points, 15 rebounds, and 6 blocks against Montgomery High School. With a 17–13 record, the Lady Mustangs earned their first home playoff game and the first playoff win in school history against Patrick Henry High School. She was named to the 2013-2014 First Team All-League for the Metro Mesa Conference.

As a senior (2014–2015), Quiñones averaged 11.4 points and 10.3 rebounds per game. She led the Lady Mustangs to the first road playoff victory against higher ranked Imperial High School. On December 7, 2014, the Lady Mustangs defeated Castle Park Trojans with a final score of 40–25. Quiñones was identified as a key varsity player. On December 8, against Castle Park High School, she recorded her first Double-Double. On December 30, she recorded 26 points, 14 rebounds, and two blocks in the game against Castle Park High School. On February 12, 2015, she tallied 11 points, 21 rebounds, and 11 blocks in the game against Bonita Vista High School. She graduated with a 4.3 GPA.

She also played Amateur Athletic Union (AAU) ball with the San Diego Sol Fire and San Diego Sol Elite.

== College career ==
Quiñones enrolled at Dartmouth College as a member of the class of 2019 to play basketball under coach Belle Koclanes, who recognized Quiñones as "naturally gifted, 6-3 presence on the floor with skill sets that are really just scratching the surface. She has the ability to score from the perimeter as well as in the paint and defensively has the length to majorly disrupt opponents. Most importantly, Ice is a consummate teammate who takes great pride in taking care of her family."

As a freshman (2015–2016), she played in nine games, averaging 0.4 points and 0.6 rebounds while averaging three minutes per game.

As a sophomore (2016–2017), she started 21 of 27 games played, was second on the team with 22 blocks, averaged 9.1 points per game, scored a career-high 23 points in Dartmouth's 4OT thriller vs. Columbia (1/27), grabbed a career-high 13 rebounds and five steals vs. Albany (12/29), scored 18 points and grabbed 11 rebounds and dished three assists vs. Harvard (1/21), shot 41.8 percent from the field and made 74 of 94 free throw attempts.

As a junior (2017–2018), she started 19 of 25 games played, led the team in total rebounds with 163 and offensive boards with 48, averaged 6.5 per game, was first on the team with 18 blocks, third on the team in scoring, averaged 10.5 points per game and had the most rebounds in nine different games, including wins over Vermont (11/10), NJIT (11/26) and Yale (1/27 and 2/16). She scored a season-high 22 points against Princeton (2/23), one point away from matching her career-high, second on the team in steals with 23, recorded double-doubles against Vermont, NJIT and in both Yale games, posted the team-best blocked shots in a single game against Columbia (2/3) with three, one of two players to play all 45 minutes at Yale (2/16) and played all 40 minutes in three other games. She helped set team records for most points scored in a quarter against Columbia (35 pts; 2/3) and for single-season three-point field goals made and attempted (187–473). In the first Big Green's home victory over the Harvard (63–58) since January 2013, Quiñones had 10 points and five rebounds.

As a senior (2018–2019), Quiñones was named second team All-Ivy League. She started all 27 games that season for the Big Green, led the team with 14.0 points per game, first on the team with 18 blocked shots, second with 6.3 rebounds per game, and third on the team with 34 steals per game. She led team in rebounding in 11 different games, tied career high in points with 23 against Brown (2/23), and scored in double figures in 20 different games. In the first road season game against Vermont, Quiñones had 22 points, seven rebounds and three steals for the win. On November 9, 2018, against Loyola University Maryland, Quiñones led on the offensive end with a double-double of ten points and 12 rebounds. On November 11, 2018, she once again led the way, scoring 22 points on 9 of 17 shooting and adding seven rebounds and three steals. In November 2018, against UC Santa Barbara, she led Dartmouth with 20 points and six rebounds. On December 9, 2018, she led the way for Dartmouth with 18 points, four rebounds and two steals. Dartmouth went to beat Cornell (63–56) on the road with Quiñones scoring 19 points and nine rebounds. She was 5 for 7 from the arc. Dartmouth beat Columbia 70-69 on the road with Quiñones hitting a pair of free throws with 4 seconds left to give the Big Green the win. She had a game-high 21 points. On February 22, 2019, Dartmouth beat Yale at home in a buzzer-beating put-back from Paula Lenart, when Quiñones attempted a three-pointer with six seconds to go for the win (56–54). She led the team with 18 points. The next day against Brown, Quiñones led the Big Green with 23 points for the 78–43 win.

Upon graduation, she was awarded the Gail Koziara '82 Most Valuable Player Award.

She earned a Dartmouth College Bachelor of Arts in Environmental Engineering on June 9, 2019, and will earned a Bachelor of Science in engineering in March 2020 from Dartmouth College - Thayer School of Engineering. She also received the John C. Woodhouse Environmental Engineering Prize which is awarded annually for the best work in the field of environmental study of research.

=== Dartmouth statistics ===
Legend
GP	Games played	GS	Games started	MPG	Minutes per game
FG%	Field goal percentage	3P%	3-point field goal percentage	FT%	Free throw percentage
RPG	Rebounds per game	APG	Assists per game	SPG	Steals per game
BPG	Blocks per game	PPG	Points per game	**Bold**	Career high

Year	Team	GP	Points	FG%	3P%	FT%	RPG	APG	SPG	BPG	PPG
2015-16	Dartmouth	9	4	14.3	0.0	50.0	0.6	-	0.2	-	0.4
2016-17	Dartmouth	**27**	246	41.8	25.0	**78.7**	5.9	1.7	**1.6**	**0.8**	9.1
2017-18	Dartmouth	25	263	**46.3**	20.9	71.4	**6.5**	1.6	0.9	0.7	10.5
2018-19	Dartmouth	**27**	**378**	45.3	**39.2**	75.0	6.3	**1.8**	1.3	0.7	**14.0**
Career		88	891	44.4%	32.9%	75.2%	5.7	1.5	1.1	0.7	10.1

== National team career ==
In 2017, Quiñones' parents reached out to Puerto Rico's National Team management to understand the process for consideration into the program. In preparation for the Centrobasket and Pre-World Cup 2017 Tournament, Quiñones was one of several players invited to tryouts. The Centrobasket would grant three teams the opportunity to compete in the Pre-World Cup 2017 Tournament. Several new players were invited to the tryouts as Puerto Rican Basketball Federation (FBPUR) President Yum Ramos expressed this was an opportunity for a generational turnover. On June 26, 2017, Quiñones was listed on the official roster for Centrobasket 2017. The intent of the new roster was to rejuvenate the team. They brought energy and speed commented Jerry Batista, the National team coach. He also touted the group as "hungry, athletic, and quick". The Centrobasket 2017 was held in St. Thomas Virgin Island. In the game against Jamaica, Quiñones scored 12 points to secure a win 90–44. In the game against Bahamas, Quiñones scored eight points for the 69–42 win. Puerto Rico earned the bronze medal.

Shortly after 2017 Centrobasket, Quiñones made the roster for the 2017 FIBA Women's AmeriCup. Puerto Rico was part of Group B which included Paraguay, Canada, Cuba and Mexico. The youngest player in the team, Quiñones was recognized by Coach Batista as a player with great expectations and the future of the National team. The Americup 2017 tournament was held in Argentina from August 6 to 13, 2017. Puerto Rico went on to win the bronze medal with historic win (75–68) against Brazil, earning their World Cup ticket.

In July 2018, Quiñones made the roster for the 2018 Central American Games held in Barranquilla, Colombia. Coach Batista identified Quiñones as a key player in the team. In the game against Guatemala, she contributed 11 points in the 112–36 win. The team won the bronze medal.

In August 2018, Quiñones made the roster for the 2018 Centrobasket in Manati, Puerto Rico. Puerto Rico faced Bahamas, Costa Rica and Mexico in group B. Puerto Rico secured the ticket to Americup 2019, earning the gold medal.

In September 2018, Quiñones made the roster for the 2018 World Cup held in Tenerife, Spain. Puerto Rico played against Japan, Belgium and Spain in Group B. After the tournament, she returned to Dartmouth College to complete her studies.

From July 26 to August 11, 2019, Quiñones participated in the 2019 Pan American Games in Lima, Peru. She was a big factor in the success of team Puerto Rico earning the bronze medal. She averaged 7.4 points and 4.2 rebounds in just over 22 minutes per game. Her best performance was in the bronze medal game; she had 12 points, five rebounds and a steal. She had 11 points, four rebounds and a block against Canada and eight points, five boards, one steal and a block against the U.S.

In September 2019, Quiñones took part of the 2019 FIBA Women's AmeriCup held in Puerto Rico. Puerto Rico was part of Group A which included Dominican Republic, Cuba, Canada and Mexico. Quiñones had key 3-pointers that contributed to the win against Cuba (80–55). Puerto Rico came in fourth place.

Quiñones was the top performer at FIBA's Women's Olympic pre-qualifying tournament 2019 in Edmonton, Canada in the game between Puerto Rico and the Dominican Republic and FIBA's Olympic pre-qualifying tournament 2020 in Bourges, France in the game between Puerto Rico and France. She represented Puerto Rico at the Tokyo 2020 Olympics.
