= John Joseph Montgomery =

American inventor, engineer and professor

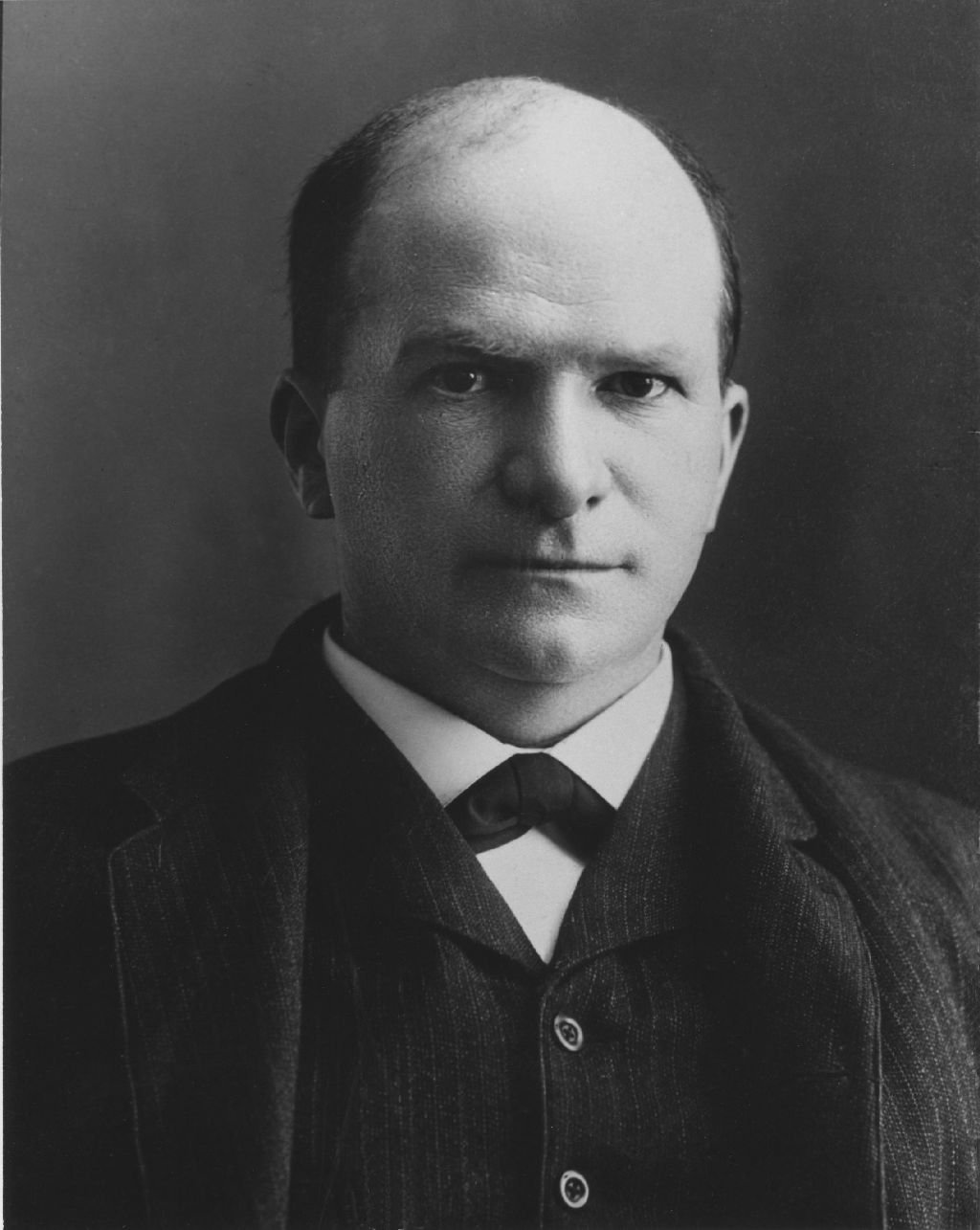
- Born: February 15, 1858; Yuba City, California, U.S.
- Died: October 31, 1911 (aged 53); Evergreen, San Jose, California, U.S.
- Cause of death: Gliding accident
- Resting place: Colma, California; 37.671155°N 122.445191°W
- Education: St. Ignatius College (BA, MS)
- Occupations: Aviation pioneer, inventor, professor of physics, physicist
- Spouse: Regina Cleary (m. 1910)

Signature
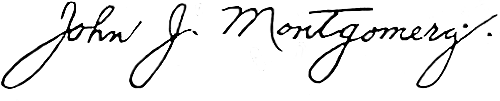

John Joseph Montgomery (February 15, 1858 – October 31, 1911) was an American inventor, physicist, engineer, and professor at Santa Clara University in Santa Clara, California, who is best known for his invention of controlled heavier-than-air flying machines.

In the 1880s Montgomery, a native of Yuba City, California, made manned flight experiments in a series of gliders in the United States in Otay Mesa in San Diego, California. Although not publicized in the 1880s, these early flights were first described by Montgomery as part of a lecture delivered at the International Conference on Aerial Navigation at Chicago, 1893. These independent advances came after gliding flights by European pioneers such as George Cayley's coachman in England (1853) and Jean-Marie Le Bris in France (1856). Although Montgomery never claimed firsts, his gliding experiments of the 1880s are considered by some historians and organizations to have been the first controlled flights of a heavier-than-air flying machine in America or in the Western Hemisphere, depending on the source.

Montgomery devised different control methods for his gliders, including weight shifting for roll and an elevator for pitch (1884). Subsequent designs used hinged, pilot-operated trailing edge flaps on the wings (1885–1886) for roll control, and later, full wing warping systems for roll (1903–1905) and for both pitch and roll (1911).

== Education ==
Montgomery attended St. Ignatius High School, graduating in 1873. At age 16 he attended the preparatory division at Santa Clara College from 1874 to 1876 to prepare for college.

Montgomery attended St. Ignatius College, now known as the University of San Francisco. Here, he studied under Fathers Joseph Bayma, S.J., and Joseph Neri, S.J., two gifted and influential educators. As a student in San Francisco, Montgomery must have mentioned his desire to build a flying machine, according to Fogel and Harwood. They include an observation in their book, made by Montgomery's contemporary, Rev. Fred Morrison, S.J.: “In those days anyone who even mentioned ‘man being able to fly’ was considered a little bit off. So, when John was in the vicinity, there was a general tapping of heads, which in our present day would be the sign that the party was crazy.” At St. Ignatius College, Montgomery received a Bachelor of Arts in physics in 1879 and a master's degree in physics in 1880. He also received an honorary PhD in physics from Santa Clara University in 1901.

== Ornithology ==
In the early 1880s Montgomery began studying the anatomy of a variety of large soaring birds to determine their basic characteristics like wing area, weight and curved surfaces. He made detailed observations of birds in flight, especially large soaring birds such as eagles, hawks, vultures and pelicans which soared on thermals near San Diego Bay.

He initially attempted to achieve manned flight with ornithopters. In 1883, he built and experimented with a series of three ornithopters but found that human strength was insufficient to generate the necessary lift. He abandoned flapping-wing flight, preferring instead to emulate soaring birds with fixed-wing craft. He reasoned that it would be possible to solve the physics of gliding and soaring flight and then add a motor.

== Fixed-wing gliders ==
Montgomery first tested his concepts for the design, construction and control of gliders with small-scale, free flight models. His first glider in 1883-84 had a cambered airfoil based on the curve of the seagull wing. Pitch was controlled by an operable elevator and roll was controlled by pilot weight shift. Yaw was uncontrolled. This aircraft design served as the basis for three gliders over the period 1883–1886. In the spring of 1884, Montgomery made flights of up to 600 feet (180 m) from the rim of Otay Mesa. During experiments with this craft, Montgomery found that the glider would not respond well to side gusts. He returned to ornithology and noted how turkey vultures had significant dihedral and twisted their wings as a form of lateral balance.

Emulating these control methods, in 1884-1885 he incorporated hinged flaps into the trailing edge of a second glider. These were held under spring tension for automatic balance in gusts, but were also connected through cables to the pilot's seat so they could be operated mechanically by the pilot for roll control. In essence these flaps were early ailerons. The second glider had a flat plate airfoil, considerable dihedral for stability and an operable elevator for pitch control. Montgomery devised an inclined rail system so the piloted glider could roll from the top of a hill and attain flight speed.

In the winter of 1885–86, Montgomery constructed a third glider. It had a cambered airfoil modeled after the wings of a vulture, though the leading and trailing edges were turned upward slightly. The wing, spanwise, was "gull" shaped. Controls allowed the pilot to vary the angle of incidence of the left and right wing either in unison or independently. Dihedral and an operable elevator were also included. Montgomery concluded that a better understanding of aerodynamics was needed for the design of a proper airfoil.

In an 1893 speech, Montgomery said that flights were made in these three craft during the period 1884–1886, with the occasional assistance of at least three friends and two younger brothers. Of the flight trials with the second craft (of 1885) Octave Chanute's account in 1893 noted "several trials were made, but no effective lift could be obtained." Of the third craft (of 1886) Chanute wrote "this last apparatus proved an entire failure, as no effective lifting effect could be obtained from the wind sufficient to carry the 180 lbs. it was designed to bear.""

Montgomery's own account made clear that he considered the technology of the second and third gliders of 1885 and 1886 as effective, but the airfoil designs were a disappointment in terms of lift-generation as they produced much shorter gliding flights in comparison to the first craft of 1884. He realized he was getting increasingly farther from understanding the mechanism of lift and began controlled laboratory experiments to investigate airfoils. In 1886, he briefly considered filing a patent caveat for lateral balancing, but did not.

== Aerodynamics ==
About 1885 Montgomery began a long series of experiments with a whirling arm device, a smoke chamber, a water current table and large wooden surfaces angled into the wind in order to understand the physics of flow around curved surfaces. He also used dried bird wings placed in wind currents to observe the effect. His work in the 1880s confirmed that mechanical systems used by a pilot could preserve lateral balance and some degree of equilibrium in gliding flight. His experiments also confirmed the value of a cambered surface for obtaining lift.

In 1893 Montgomery visited the World's Columbian Exposition in Chicago, intending initially to attend a lecture by electrical expert Nikola Tesla. Upon arrival, he heard of the International Conference on Aerial Navigation to take place the first week of August. He introduced himself to Octave Chanute and Albert F. Zahm, who were collaborating in chairing the conference. He did not present a paper, but was subsequently invited by Chanute and Zahm to participate in the conference by giving two lectures of his own. His first focused on his experiments with surfaces in air and water currents. This talk was revised into an article and included in the conference proceedings. The article was later published in the July 1894 edition of Aeronautics. With encouragement from Chanute, Montgomery decided to give a second lecture. Although he refrained from providing enough detail that might be useful to designers, he did discuss use of hinged wing sections for lateral control. His second lecture was not published as part of the conference proceedings, because Chanute thought Montgomery wanted to seek patent protection. Instead, Chanute presented his own comments on Montgomery's flight experiments in his article series Progress in Flying Machines, which was published serially in the American Engineer and Railroad Journal in 1893, and in the following year as a book of the same name. Montgomery reprised his second lecture in a talk to the Aeronautical Society of New York in 1910, and the contents were later published in several journals and books.

From 1893 to 1895, while teaching at Mount St. Joseph's College in Rohnerville, California, Montgomery conducted further experiments into the physics of flow over a wing and lift generation using a smoke chamber and water table. From these experiments he developed a theory of lift based on vorticity, or what modern aerodynamicists refer to as a "circulation theory" or "lifting-line theory". Montgomery compiled his results into a 131-page manuscript titled Soaring Flight and attempted to have it published by Matthias N. Forney and the editors of Scientific American with the help of Octave Chanute. Chanute was reluctant to endorse it due to his disagreements with some of its theoretical content and suggested that it be edited to distinguish between experimental results and theoretical inferences. Scientific American rejected the manuscript, but later published an abstract. Chanute also directed one of his collaborators, Augustus Herring, to study the manuscript, as he considered it instructive in understanding "ground effect."

== Invention ==
In 1884 Montgomery received a patent for a process to vulcanize and de-vulcanize India rubber. In 1895 and again in the period 1901 to 1904, Montgomery occasionally supplemented his aeronautical research with work in other branches of science, including electricity, communication, astronomy and mining. In 1895 he received four patents (American, German, British, and Canadian) for improvements in the efficiency of petroleum burning furnaces. In 1897 he took a teaching position at Santa Clara College and directed study of wireless telegraphy with Father Richard Bell. They were first to successfully transmit messages from Santa Clara College to San Francisco. Montgomery also patented two gold concentrator devices to assist miners in extracting gold from beach sands (see patent list).

== Tandem-wing gliders ==
In early 1903, veteran balloonist Thomas Scott Baldwin sought Montgomery's knowledge of aeronautics. Baldwin had also been assisting August Greth in constructing and experimenting with an airship (dubbed the California Eagle) at San Jose, California. Baldwin wanted improved propeller designs for dirigibles. He stopped working with Greth and came to Santa Clara College for an extended period to learn aeronautics from Montgomery. Their work together included wind tunnel tests at the college. At Baldwin's suggestion, they entered into a business arrangement in 1904 to make public exhibitions with manned Montgomery gliders launched at high altitudes from unmanned Baldwin balloons. By late May 1904, Montgomery made test flights with a new glider. However, Baldwin abandoned their collaboration and instead constructed his own airship (the California Arrow) at San Jose incorporating Montgomery's propeller design and a 7-horsepower motorcycle engine (the Hercules of G.H. Curtiss Mfg Co.). The California Arrow would be first in America to make repeated circuits under control. During a protracted period of acrimony between Montgomery and Baldwin, Baldwin entered the California Arrow in the aeronautic competition at the St. Louis World's Fair in November, 1904 and took first place.

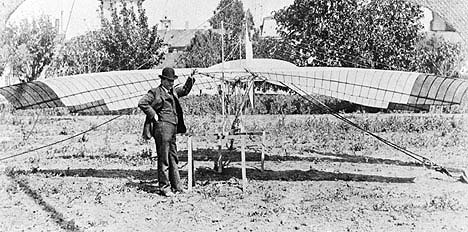
John J. Montgomery and his tandem-wing glider The Santa Clara on 29 April 1905

In the fall of 1904 Montgomery conducted tests of his tandem-wing glider, the Montgomery Aeroplane, with associates Frank Hamilton and Daniel J. Maloney. On March 16, 17 and 20, 1905, in Aptos, California, Daniel Maloney made several successful flights in the glider at Leonard's ranch (Rancho San Antonio, now known as Seascape), after releasing from a hot-air balloon at high altitude. The resulting glides were well-controlled, and flights lasted up to 13 minutes. News of these flights received attention in both the U.S. and Europe. After this success, Montgomery gave a press conference to provide for the first time a history of his efforts in aeronautics and announced a patent application for his aeroplane and methods of wing warping. On April 29, 1905, Montgomery, Maloney, and Hamilton provided a public demonstration of the Montgomery Aeroplane, rechristened that day as The Santa Clara in honor of Santa Clara College. In view of hundreds of spectators and members of the press, Maloney released from the balloon at an approximate altitude of 4,000 feet above Santa Clara College. Maloney performed a series of pre-determined maneuvers and made a soft landing near the college grounds. This exhibition brought widespread recognition for Montgomery and was generally accepted as a milestone in aviation. In the following months Montgomery and Maloney made many exhibitions with The Santa Clara and another tandem wing glider The California in the San Francisco bay area. On July 18, 1905, Maloney was killed when a rope from the balloon damaged the glider during the ascent, causing structural failure after release. Despite this, Montgomery continued experiments with other tandem-wing gliders and pilots for some time.

== Evergreen ==
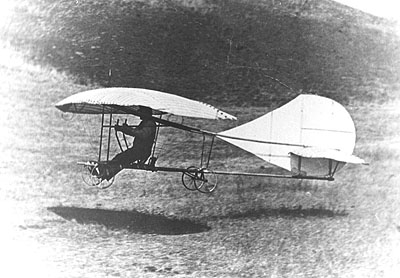
John J. Montgomery landing The Evergreen monoplane glider in October, 1911.

Following the catastrophic 1906 San Francisco earthquake, Montgomery's gliding experiments were curtailed until 1911. Montgomery began experimenting with a new control system in which pitch and roll of the glider were managed by wing warping, while the tail assembly was fixed. Montgomery intended to add a motor and apply for a patent. This glider, The Evergreen (named after the Evergreen district of San Jose, California where flight tests occurred), was flown by Montgomery as well as another aeronaut, Reinhardt, more than 50 times in October 1911.

== Death ==
On October 31, 1911, Montgomery was attempting to land Evergreen at low speed and encountered turbulence, which caused a stall. He crashed and died from his injuries at the site. The hillside (now known as "Montgomery Hill") is just behind Evergreen Valley College. John J. Montgomery was buried at Holy Cross Cemetery in Colma, California on November 3, 1911.

== Organizational memberships ==
- The Pacific Aero Club (1909), founding member.
- The Aero Club of Illinois (1910).
- The Aeronautical Society of New York (1910), elected honorary member "in recognition of his manifold labors to advance the art of aviation."
- The Aeronautical Society (1911), as invited member of the Research Committee of the Technical Board and Organization and Convention Committee.
- The Santa Clara Valley Aero Club (1911), first Vice President.

== Gallant Journey ==
In 1946, Columbia Pictures released Gallant Journey, a full-length movie based on John J. Montgomery's life and work. The film was directed by William A. Wellman, and starred Glenn Ford as Montgomery, Janet Blair as his wife Regina (née Cleary), whom he had married in 1910, and Charles Ruggles. The stunt pilots for the film were Paul Mantz, Paul Tuntland and Don Stevens. The film included several different historical reenactments of Montgomery's glider flights. Gallant Journey premiered in San Diego, California on September 2, 1946, and had its full national release September 24, 1946. As part of the publicity for the movie, Columbia Pictures sponsored a cross-country Boston to Los Angeles tour featuring a 1911 vintage auto, the same vintage as Montgomery's last flight. William Wellman had served previously in the U.S. Army Air Corps and was stationed as an officer at Rockwell Field, San Diego, California and Glenn Ford had also served in San Diego during World War II.

== Recognition ==
=== Historical landmarks ===
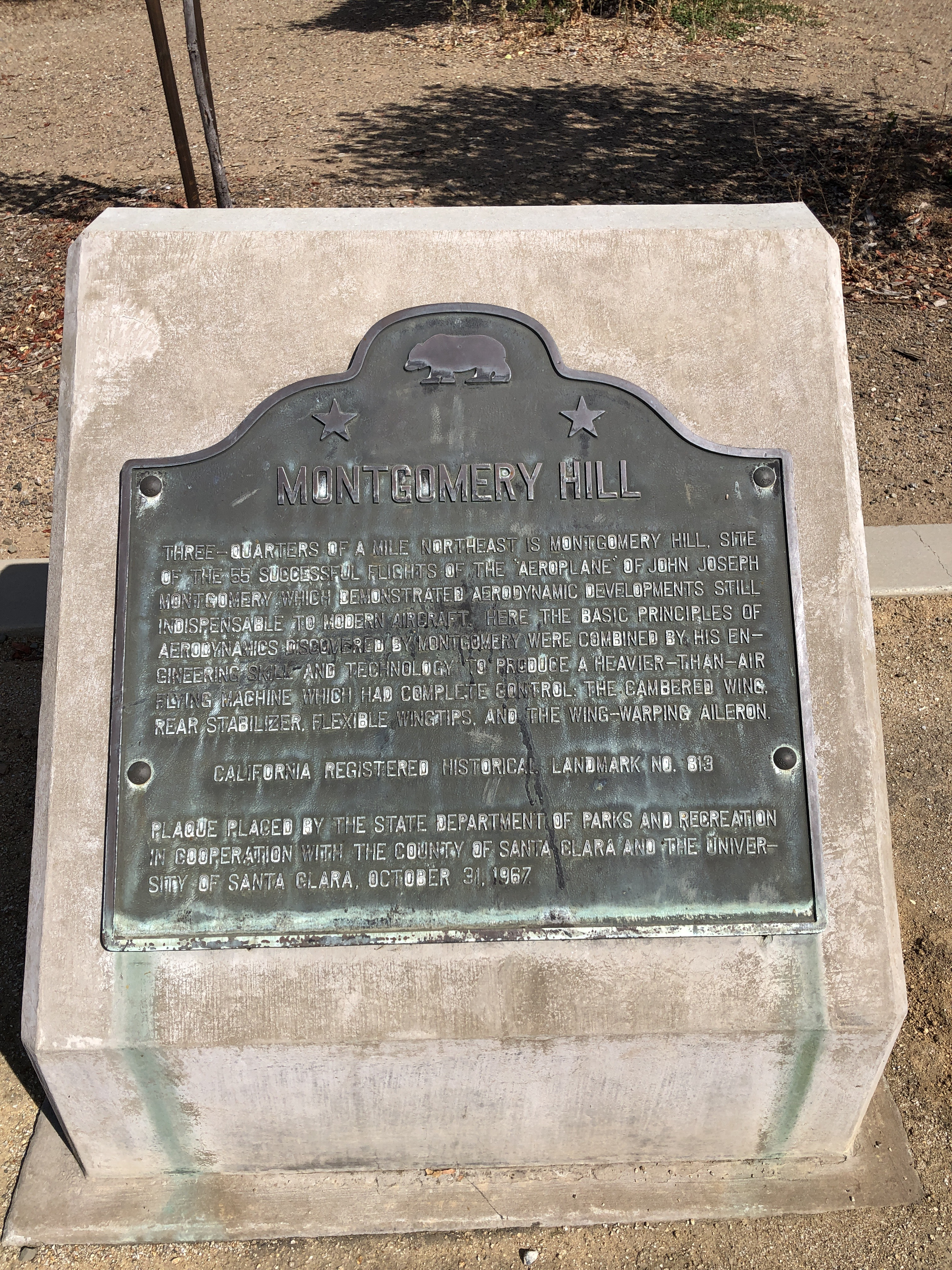
The plaque placed at Montgomery Grove. It was relocated from Evergreen Valley College's campus to the current site.

Two California Historical Landmarks are associated with Montgomery:

- Montgomery Memorial, Otay Mesa. The Montgomery Memorial was dedicated on May 21, 1950, and features a silver static test wing panel for the Consolidated B-32 Dominator mounted upright that is visible for miles. It is also associated with a recreation center near the location of his first glides (Montgomery-Waller Recreation Center, San Diego, California). The memorial was designed by pioneering modernist Lloyd Ruocco.
- Montgomery Hill, San Jose near Evergreen Valley College. Evergreen Valley College also honors his memory with a green space (Montgomery Grove), a lecture hall (Montgomery Hall), and an observatory (Montgomery Hill Observatory). On March 15, 2008, a sculpture was unveiled at San Felipe and Yerba Buena roads in San Jose, California as a tribute to Montgomery. The 30-foot-tall steel structure of a glider wing was placed on a 32-foot-diameter plaza (later designated Montgomery Plaza) designed by San Francisco artist Kent Roberts.

=== Airports and aviation clubs ===
In 1919, the San Francisco Board of Supervisors changed the name of the Marina Flying Field just east of Crissy Field to "Montgomery Field." From 1920 to 1944 Montgomery Field served as an airmail facility. This field still exists along the Embarcadero as Marina Green.

On May 20, 1950, Montgomery Field (KMYF) in San Diego, California, one of the busiest general aviation airports in the world, was named in his honor.

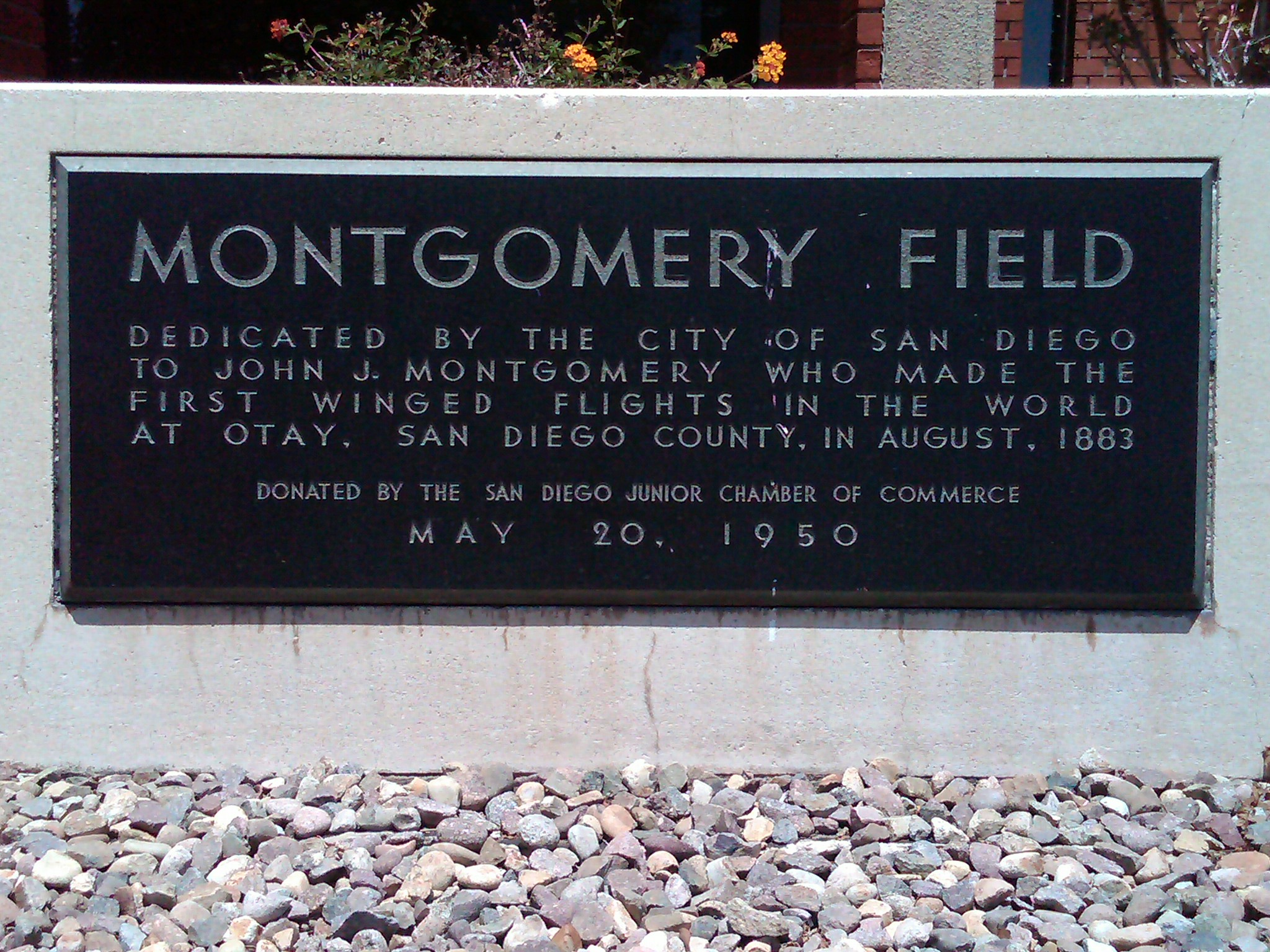
Dedication plaque for Montgomery Field, San Diego

Civil Air Patrol Squadron 36 in San Jose, California is named the "John J. Montgomery Memorial Cadet Squadron 36" in his honor. Their motto is "Exceed the Challenge." Experimental Aircraft Association Chapter 338 in San Jose, California is also named in honor of Montgomery.

=== Schools ===
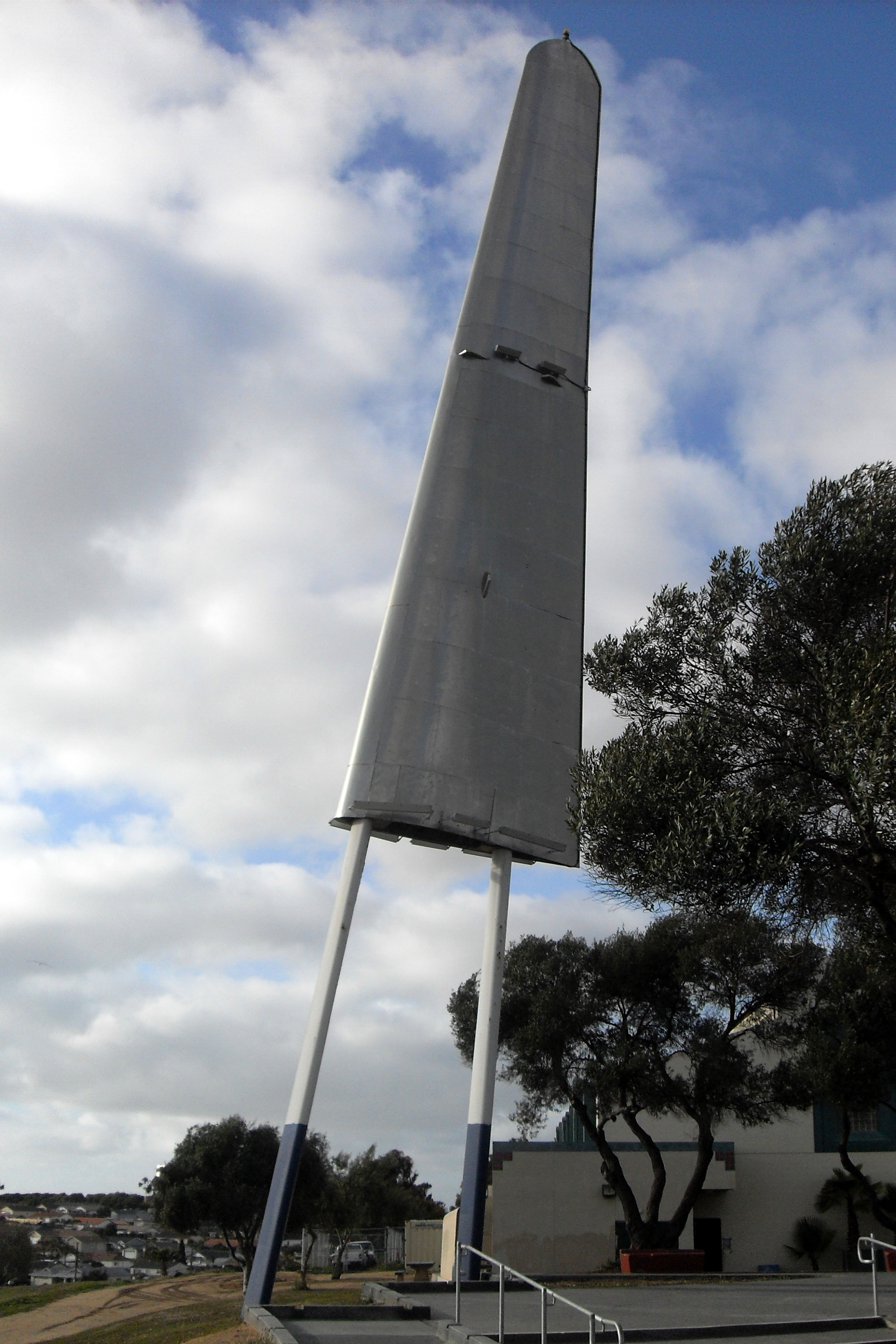
Silver Wing monument at Montgomery-Waller Recreation Center in Otay Mesa, San Diego, California

- Chula Vista Elementary School District
  - John J. Montgomery Elementary School, Chula Vista, California
- Evergreen Elementary School District
  - John J. Montgomery Elementary School, San Jose, California
- San Diego Unified School District
  - Montgomery Middle School, San Diego, California
- Sweetwater Union High School District
  - Montgomery High School, San Diego, California
  - Montgomery Middle School, San Diego, California

=== Other recognition ===
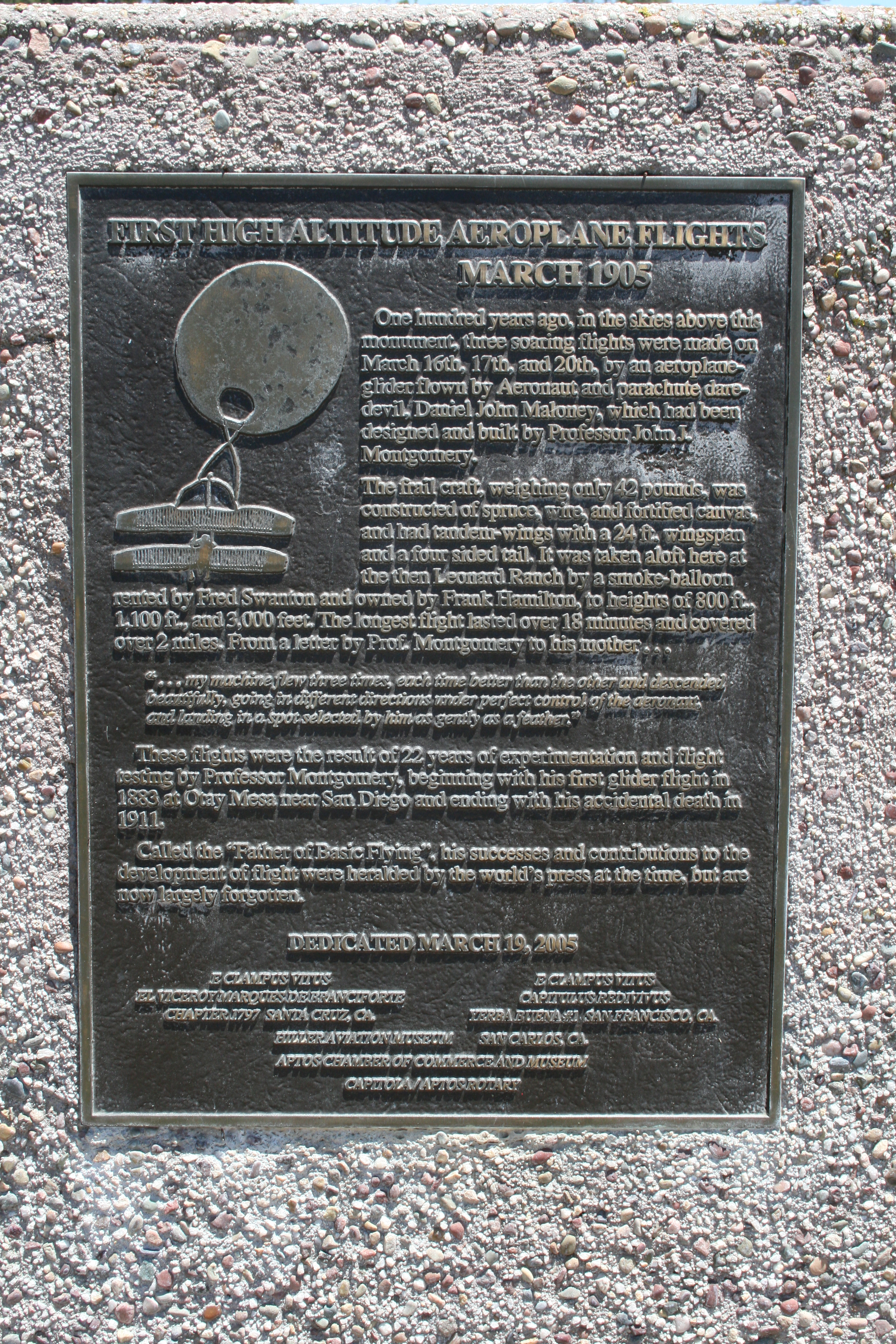
A marker placed at Aptos, California where Montgomery's tandem-wing glider was flown in March 1905 for the first high-altitude flights in the world.

John J. Montgomery was inducted into the National Aviation Hall of Fame in 1964, U.S. Soaring Hall of Fame in 2001, California Aviation Hall of Fame in 2015., and International Aerospace Hall of Fame in 2017.

In 1924, a new engineering building was dedicated as the Montgomery Laboratories on the campus of Santa Clara University. This laboratory was located where Mayer Theatre is today. A celebration was held March 18, 1934 at Santa Clara University to mark the 50th anniversary of Montgomery's first glider flight. Also on the campus of Santa Clara University, an obelisk was dedicated by the citizens of Santa Clara, California to Montgomery on April 29, 1946, at the location of Maloney's 1905 glider flights.

In 1949, a section of what is now part of the Interstate 5 freeway that passes through the former site of the Montgomery 1880s Fruitland Ranch and goes from the Mexican border to downtown San Diego, California was named the John J. Montgomery Freeway.

In the 1960s, the National Society of Aerospace Professionals and the San Diego Aerospace Museum established a John J. Montgomery Award for aerospace excellence. Members of the X-15, Mercury, and Polaris programs received the award, including astronauts such as Neil Armstrong. In 1968, the City of Santa Clara dedicated October 31, 1968 as "John J. Montgomery Day" in his honor.

On May 11, 1996, Montgomery's 1883 glider was recognized as an International Historic Mechanical Engineering Landmark by the American Society of Mechanical Engineers.

On March 19, 2005, John J. Montgomery was the focus of a Centennial Celebration of Soaring Flight, held in Aptos, California at the location of some of his early glider experiments. At this celebration, a marker was placed in Aptos in honor of the first manned high−altitude flights.

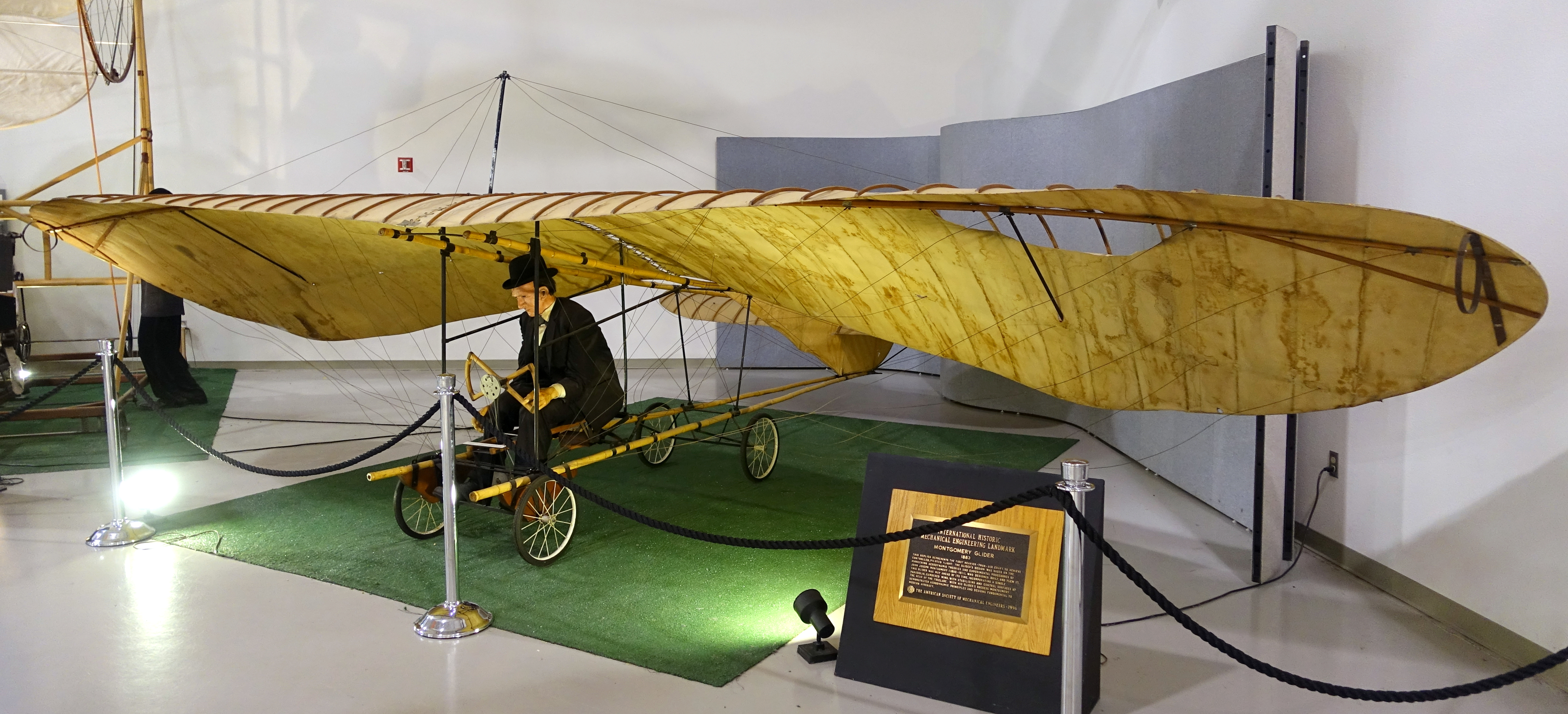
Replica of The Evergreen at the Hiller Aviation Museum

On April 5, 2008, a celebration of the 125th anniversary of John Montgomery's first glide took place at the Hiller Aviation Museum in San Carlos, California.

The City of San Diego dedicated August 23, 2008 as "John J. Montgomery Day" in San Diego. The City Council made a similar dedication on November 9, 2017.

In May 2016, the San Diego Air & Space Museum established a new exhibit for John J. Montgomery in their main rotunda, including The Evergreen glider from 1911 and Montgomery's original Soaring Flight manuscript from 1896. In 2017, Montgomery was inducted into the International Air & Space Hall of Fame at the Museum.

In June 2023, a replica of The Santa Clara glider was installed in the lobby of Crownair Aviation at Montgomery-Gibbs Executive Airport in San Diego. The glider is on loan from the San Diego Air and Space Museum.

Also in 2023, the American Society of Mechanical Engineers established a new annual "John J. Montgomery Award for Distinguished Innovation in Aerospace" designed to "recognize the outstanding contribution of an individual engineer residing in the international community who has researched, designed or developed (or any combination thereof) new technologies or equipment for the aerospace industry, i.e., propulsion, aerospace structure/materials, stability and control, etc." This medal was first offered in 2024.

== See also ==
- Timeline of aviation – 19th century
- List of Santa Clara University people
- Daniel J. Maloney
- Frederick Marriott
- Zachariah Montgomery
- Wright brothers

== Publications ==
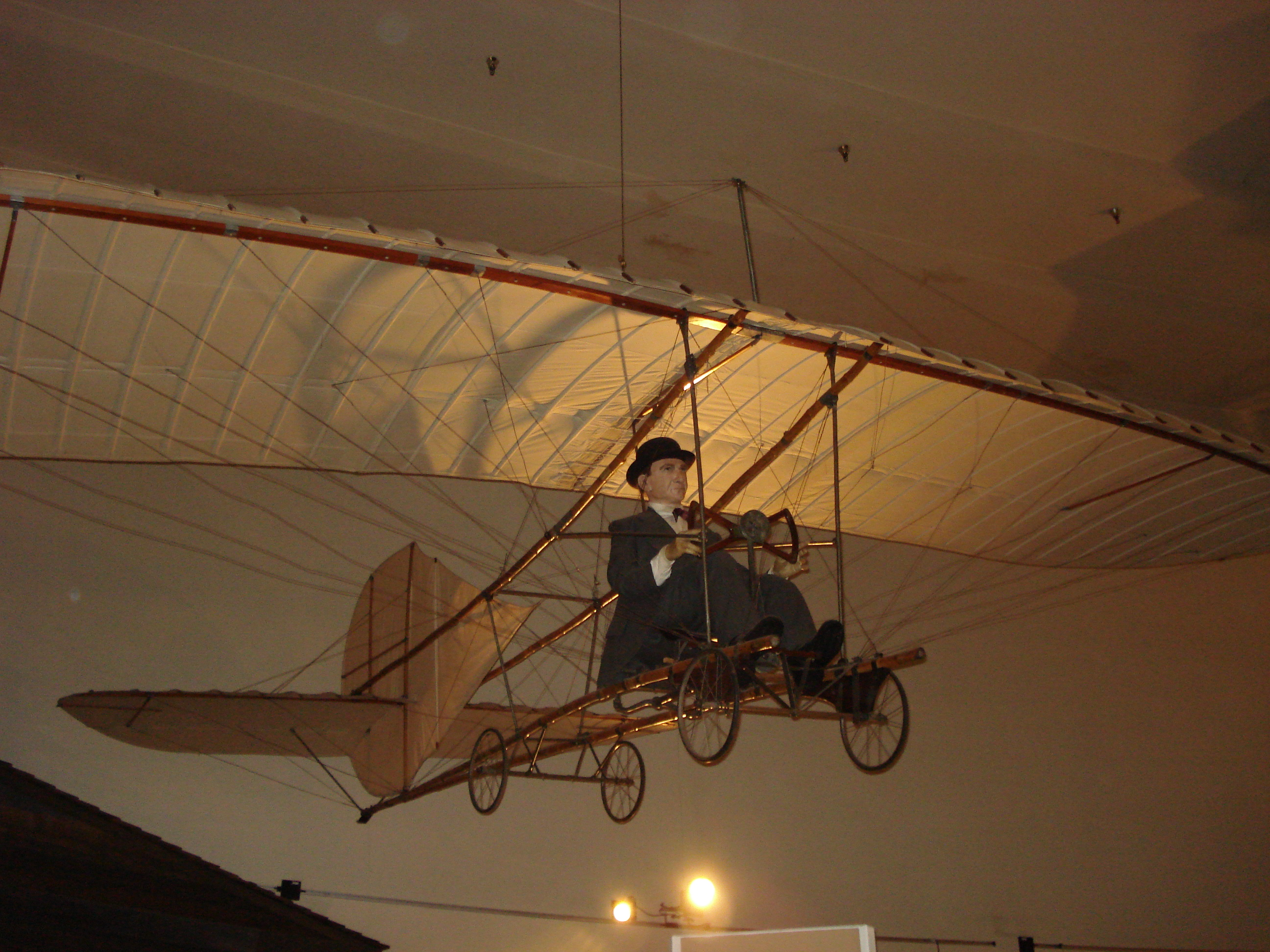
The Evergreen glider restored by the Smithsonian Institution on display at the San Diego Air & Space Museum

- Montgomery, John J. Discussions on the Various Papers on Soaring Flight Proceedings of the International Conference on Aerial Navigation, Chicago, Aug. 1–4. 1893 pp. 246–249.
- Montgomery, John J. Soaring Flight, manuscript, 1895 (under flickr.com)
- Montgomery, John J. The Mechanics Involved in a Bird's Wing in Soaring and Their Relation to Aeronautics, Address to the Southern California Academy of Sciences, Los Angeles, Nov. 9, 1897.
- Montgomery, John J. The Aeroplane, The Aeroplane Advertising Co., Santa Clara, California, 1905.
- Montgomery, John J. "New Principles in Aerial Flight", Scientific American, November 25, 1905.
- Montgomery, John J. Principles Involved in the Formation of Winged Surfaces and the Phenomenon of Soaring, presented at the Aeronautics Congress, New York, Oct. 28–29, 1907. Published as a series in Aeronautics Vol. 3, No. 4, pp. 30–33, October, 1908; Vol. 3, No. 5, pp. 34–40, November, 1908; Vol. 3, No. 6, pp. 32–36, December, 1908; Vol. 4, No. 1, pp. 43–46.
- Montgomery, John J. "Some Early Gliding Experiments in America", Aeronautics, Vol. 4, No. 1, 1909, pp. 47–50.
- Montgomery, John J. "The Origin of Wing Warping: Professor Montgomery's Experiments", Aeronautics (London), Vol. 3, No. 6, 1910, pp. 63–64.
- Montgomery, John J. "Our Tutors in the Art of Flying", Aeronautics, September 22, 1915, pp. 99–100 (article printed posthumously).

== Patents ==
1. U.S. patent 0,308,189 - Devulcanizing and restoring vulcanized rubber - 1884 November 18
2. U.S. patent 0,549,679 - Petroleum burner - 1895 November 12
3. British Patent 21477 - Petroleum burner and furnace - 1895 November 12
4. German Patent 88977 - Petroleum oven - 1895 November 12
5. Canadian Patent 50585 - Petroleum burner - 1895 November 14
6. Canadian Patent 70319 - Concentrator - 1901 February 19
7. U.S. patent 0,679,155 - Concentrator - 1901 July 23
8. U.S. patent 0,742,889 - Concentrator - 1903 November 3
9. U.S. patent 0,831,173 - Aeroplane - 1906 September 18
10. U.S. patent 0,974,171 - Rectifying electric currents - 1910 November 1
11. U.S. patent 0,974,415 - Process for compelling electric motors to keep in step with the waves or impulses of the current driving them, and a motor embodying the process - 1910 November 1

== Biographies ==
- Spearman, Arthur Dunning John J. Montgomery: Father of Basic Flying. Santa Clara University 1967 and 2nd ed. 1977.
- Harwood, Craig S. and Fogel, Gary B. Quest for Flight: John J. Montgomery and the Dawn of Aviation in the West. University of Oklahoma Press 2012.

=== Research archives ===
- John J. Montgomery Collection, Santa Clara University, Santa Clara, California.
- John J. Montgomery Personal Papers, San Diego Air and Space Museum, San Diego, California.
- John J. Montgomery Papers 1885–1947, The Southern Historical Collection, University of North Carolina Library, Chapel Hill, North Carolina.
