= William McLeroy =

American Sergeant major (born 1960)

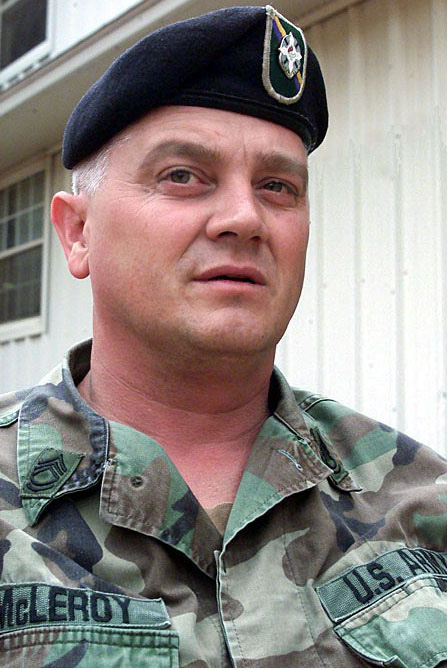
- McLeroy as a sergeant first class in 2004
- Born: 1960 (age 65–66)
- Spouse: Tina
- Military career
- Allegiance: United States
- Branch: United States Marine Corps (1980–86); United States Army Reserve (1987–14)
- Service years: 1980–2014
- Rank: Command Sergeant Major
- Nickname: Bud
- Unit: 315th Psychological Operations Company
- Conflicts: Operation Iraqi Freedom
- Awards: Purple Heart
- Other work: Firefighter, politician

William "Bud" McLeroy (born 1960) was the first amputee to serve in Operation Iraqi Freedom. He is also the first service member, and firefighter, to serve while only having one leg.

== Early life ==
Growing up in south San Diego, McLeroy attended Montgomery High School; in his senior year he changed to night classes, in order to save up money to fund his upcoming mission for the Church of Jesus Christ of Latter-day Saints . After high school, McLeroy became a missionary for two years, then enlisted in the Marine Corps.

== Military career ==
After six years in the Marine Corps, McLeroy joined the Army Reserves, before joining active duty. While on active duty, McLeroy was stationed in West Berlin, and witnessed the Berlin Wall coming down. In 1990, McLeroy returned to the Army Reserves. After losing his leg in 1993, McLeroy became the first one legged service member. In 2012, McLeroy served as a commandant of the 80th Training Command. In 2014, McLeroy was medically retired after nearly 33 years of service.

== Civilian career ==
McLeroy began working as a firefighter in San Diego in 1990; joining the Federal Fire Department of San Diego. In 1993, while in a preliminary race in Plaster City for Baja 1000, McLeroy was hit by a passing race car, severing his leg below the knee. McLeroy received his first prosthetic limb in January 1994. After losing his leg McLeroy became the nation's first professional one-legged firefighter.

== Political ambitions ==
In 2009, McLeroy announced that he would run as a candidate for the 51st Congressional district, against incumbent Bob Filner; he did not appear on the primary ballot for the seat in June 2010, instead winning a seat on the San Diego County Republican Party Central Committee. In 2010, McLeroy ran for board member of Southwestern Community College District, ranking third out of four candidates for the fifth board member seat. In 2012, McLeroy ran again for the third board member seat of Southwestern Community College District and lost, receiving 41.82% of the vote. In 2014, McLeroy ran for a seat on the Sweetwater Union High School District school board, placing second out of four candidates. In 2016, he ran for a seat on the board of the Southwestern Community College District, and came in second in a field of five candidates.
