= Olympic =

Olympic or Olympics may refer to:

== Sports ==
=== Competitions ===
- Olympic Games, international multi-sport event held since 1896
  - Summer Olympic Games
  - Winter Olympic Games
- Youth Olympic Games, youth version of the international multi-sport event held since 2010
- Ancient Olympic Games, ancient multi-sport event held in Olympia, Greece between 776 BC and 393 AD
- Olympic (greyhounds), a competition held annually at Brighton & Hove Greyhound Stadium

=== Clubs and teams ===
- Adelaide Olympic FC, a soccer club from Adelaide, South Australia
- Ballynahinch Olympic F.C., a Northern Ireland football club
- Cookstown Olympic F.C., a Northern Ireland football club
- Fribourg Olympic, a professional basketball club based in Fribourg, Switzerland
- Sydney Olympic FC, an Australian soccer club
- Olympic Club (Barbacena), a Brazilian football club based in Barbacena, Minas Gerais state
- Olympic Mvolyé, a Cameroonian football club based in Mvolyé
- Olympic Club (Egypt), a football and sports club based in Alexandria
- Blackburn Olympic F.C., an English football club based in Blackburn, Lancashire
- Rushall Olympic F.C., an English football club based in Rushall
- FC Olympic Tallinn, an Estonian football club
- Olympic Azzaweya SC, a Libyan football club based in Zawiya
- Wellington Olympic AFC, a semi-professional association football (soccer) club in Wellington, New Zealand
- Olympic FC de Niamey, a football club based in Niamey, Niger
- BK Olympic, a Swedish football club located in Lindängen
- Olympic Club, an athletic and private social club in San Francisco, California
- Boston Olympics, a defunct farm team for the Boston Bruins from 1940 to 1952
- Detroit Olympics, a minor league hockey team in Detroit, Michigan, from 1927 to 1936
- McKeesport Olympics, a professional football team from McKeesport, Pennsylvania, from 1896 until around 1940
- Washington Olympics, an early professional baseball club in Washington, DC
- FK Olimpic Sarajevo, a football club based in Sarajevo, Bosnia and Herzegovina

=== Other ===
- Olympic Stadium, name usually given to the centrepiece stadium of the Summer Olympic Games
- Olympic Conference (disambiguation), three American high school conferences

== Military ==
- USS Olympic, a United States Navy patrol vessel in commission from 1917 to 1919
- Operation Olympic, a component of Operation Downfall, the World War II Allied planned invasion of Japan

== Places ==
- Olympic, a commune in Chamkar Mon District, Phnom Penh, Cambodia
- Tai Kok Tsui, a district in Hong Kong, informally called Olympic
- Olympic (constituency), a constituency of Yau Tsim Mong District, Hong Kong
- Olympic Peninsula, a large arm of land in western Washington state, United States
  - Olympic Mountains, on the Olympic Peninsula
  - Olympic National Park, on the Olympic Peninsula

== Transportation ==
- Olympic Air, a Greek airline based in Athens, successor to Olympic Airlines
- Olympic Airlines, former state run airline of Greece that operated under the name Olympic Airways until 2009
- Olympic Steamship Company, an American company founded in 1925
- Olympic-class ocean liner, three ocean liners built for the White Star Line
  - RMS Olympic, sister ship of the RMS Titanic and HMHS Britannic
- Olympic (unfinished ship), proposed sister ship of RMS Oceanic
- Olympic-class ferry, ferries under construction for the Washington State Ferries fleet
- MV Olympic, a ferry (but not of the Olympic-class)
- Olympic-class container ship
- Olympic station, a rapid transit station in Hong Kong
- Olympic Highway, New South Wales, Australia
- Olympic Boulevard, Victoria, Australia, part of Swan Street
- Olympic Boulevard (Los Angeles), California, United States

== Arts and entertainment ==
- Olympic Studios, an independent commercial recording studio in South West London
- Olympic (band), a Czech rock band founded in 1962
- The Olympics (band), a U.S. doo-wop band from the 1950s
- Olympic Theater (disambiguation)
- "Olympic", a 1990 song from the album ex:el by 808 State
- "Olympic", a 2010 song from the album Metallic Spheres by the Orb
- "Olympics", the twelfth episode of the television series Superstore

== Other uses ==
- Olympic (soil), a soil series found in Washington and Oregon, United States
- Olympic College, Bremerton, Washington, United States
- Olympic High School (disambiguation), various schools in the United States
- Olympic Paints & Stains, a brand belonging to PPG Industries

== See also ==
- The Olympicks, an American production group
- Olympique (disambiguation)
- Cotswold Olimpick Games, sports event held in England since 1612
