= Canada Olympics =

Canada Olympics may refer to:

- 1976 Summer Olympics, (Montreal) Games of the XXI Olympiad
  - 1976 Summer Paralympics (Toronto) Torontolympiad – 1976 Olympiad for the Physically Disabled
- 2010 Winter Olympics, (Vancouver) XXI Olympic Winter Games
  - 2010 Winter Paralympics, (Vancouver and Whistler) X Paralympic Winter Games

== See also ==
- Canadian Olympic Committee
- Canada at the Olympics
- Canada at the Paralympics
- Canada Paralympics (disambiguation)
- Canada (disambiguation)
- Olympics (disambiguation)
