= Olympic Coast =

Olympic Coast may refer to:

- Olympiaki Akti (Greek: Olympic Coast Village) in Greece
- Olympic Coast National Marine Sanctuary, Olympic Peninsula, Washington State, USA
- the coast of the U.S. Washington State Olympic Peninsula
- the coast formerly ruled by Olympia, Greece

== See also ==
- Olympic (disambiguation)
- Coast (disambiguation)
