= David Garza =

David Garza may refer to:

- David Lee Garza (born 1957), American Tejano musician
- David Garza (musician) (born 1971), American musician and artist
- David Garza (racing driver) (born 1988), Mexican race car driver
- David Garza (soccer) (born 1993), American Paralympic soccer player
