= Montgomery High School (San Diego) =

Public high school in San Diego, California, United States

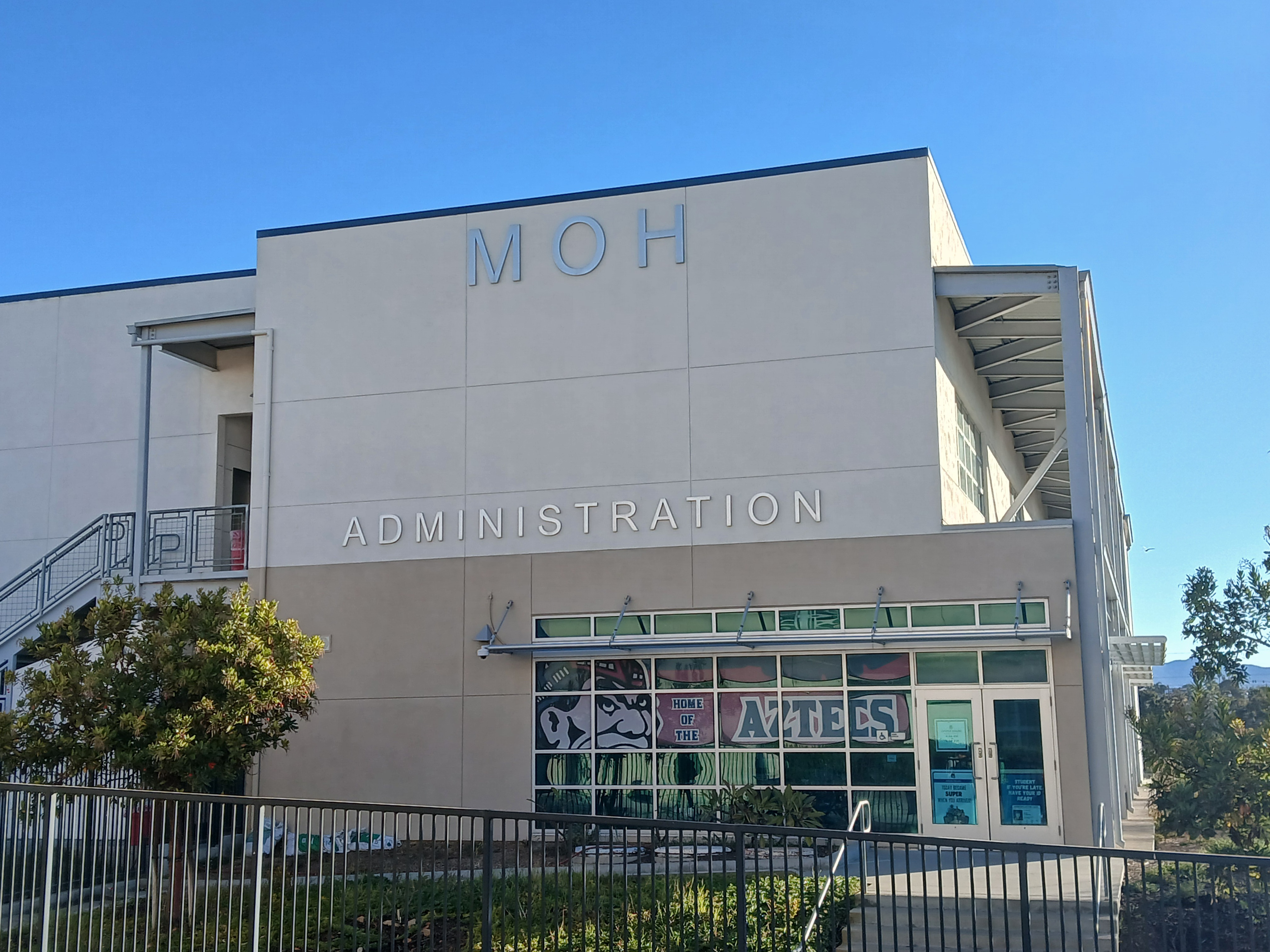
- Montgomery High School in 2025

Location
- 3250 Palm Avenue; San Diego, California, California 92154; United States; 32°35′05.47″N 117°03′52.03″W

Information
- Type: Public
- Motto: "We Are Aztecs”
- Established: 1970
- School district: Sweetwater Union High School District
- Superintendent: Moisés G. Aguirre
- Principal: Sasha Scott
- Teaching staff: 76.78 (on an FTE basis)
- Grades: 9-12
- Enrollment: 1,658 (2023–2024)
- Student to teacher ratio: 21.59
- Campus: Suburban
- Color: White Blue Red
- Fight song: SDSU fight song
- Athletics conference: Metropolitan - South Bay League
- Mascot: Monty the Aztec
- Nickname: Aztecs
- Newspaper: La Voz Azteca (Spanish), Moctezuma (English)
- Communities served: South San Diego
- TV Channel: KMMI
- Social Media: ASB
- Website: http://moh.sweetwaterschools.org/

Montgomery High School (MOH) is a four-year (grade levels 9–12) public high school in San Diego, California, United States. It opened in 1970 in the Otay Mesa neighborhood. The school serves more than 1,600 students. It is named after pioneer aviator John Joseph Montgomery, who made the first manned glider flight in U.S. history from a hill where the school is located.

== History ==
The school's construction faced delays due to strikes and financial issues, requiring students to share facilities with Mar Vista High School in 1970-71. The school’s first graduation occurred in June 1971, with its official dedication on May 21, 1972.

In 1971, there was a proposed establishment of an organic garden at the school. The garden was implemented in 1975 as part of an experimental course called Ecology, which involved 16 students. The course aimed to provide hands-on environmental education outside the traditional classroom setting. Seeds were funded through the gifted program or purchased by students. In later years the garden would be featured in an episode hosted by Huell Howser. This class is no longer taught at the school.

Montgomery High underwent extensive renovations, with classrooms being gutted and renovated in 2006 by Turner Construction. In 2009-2010 more construction work began. As such, the creation of a new synthetic field turf was installed at the school's stadium, along with new concrete work. On August 31, 2012, a formal ceremony was held to dedicate Montgomery High School's stadium in honor of Al Prazak, a former employee in the athletics department. On the original gym there is a plaque that reads the following: "In Honor Al Prazak, for his Loyalty and Dedication. 1970-1986." In 2011, a new office, classrooms, and library were constructed all in two 2-story buildings in front of campus. Other work was performed from 2011 to early 2012 under Prop-O. The new library, named for founding principal Joseph C. Torres, was opened on February, 10th 2012, and a new landscaping and quad area in front of the library and other buildings were added for the adult school adjacent to the campus. In 2014 an approximately 15,800 sq. ft. custom gym floor was installed.

In 2009, Montgomery High School in San Diego faced challenges with low test scores, prompting concern from the Sweetwater Union High School District. The District replaced the principal, implemented new schedules, and increased accountability measures. Montgomery's new principal at that time, Lee Romero, took significant action to improve student performance as part of the state system; that "parallels No Child Left Behind, which pushes school to raise test scores." However, this did spark debate among teachers and the union, who were concerned about the process. As of 2022, the changes were successful.

In 2018, San Diego law enforcement proposed to conduct an active school shooter drill and use it as cover for the arrests of four students. On Halloween, officials at Montgomery High School carried out this plan. This tactic, seen as a new and untested law enforcement strategy, was defended by Sweetwater Union High School District officials as a measure to ensure safety. However, juvenile justice advocates criticized it as violating students' rights and a misleading use of the drill.

The school also has a Vex Robotics program and hosts events for schools in San Diego County.

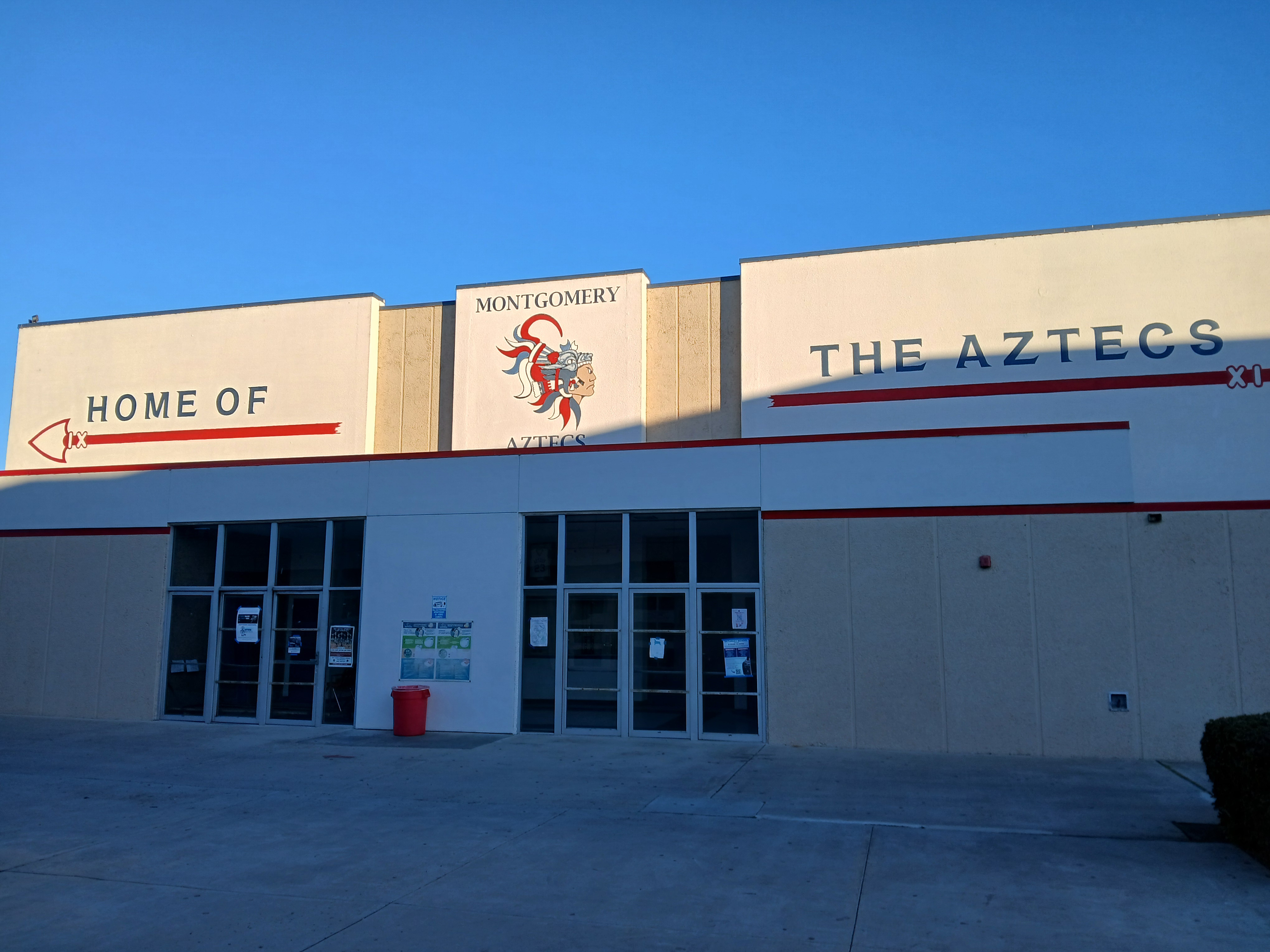
The old basketball gym, the school has two gyms.

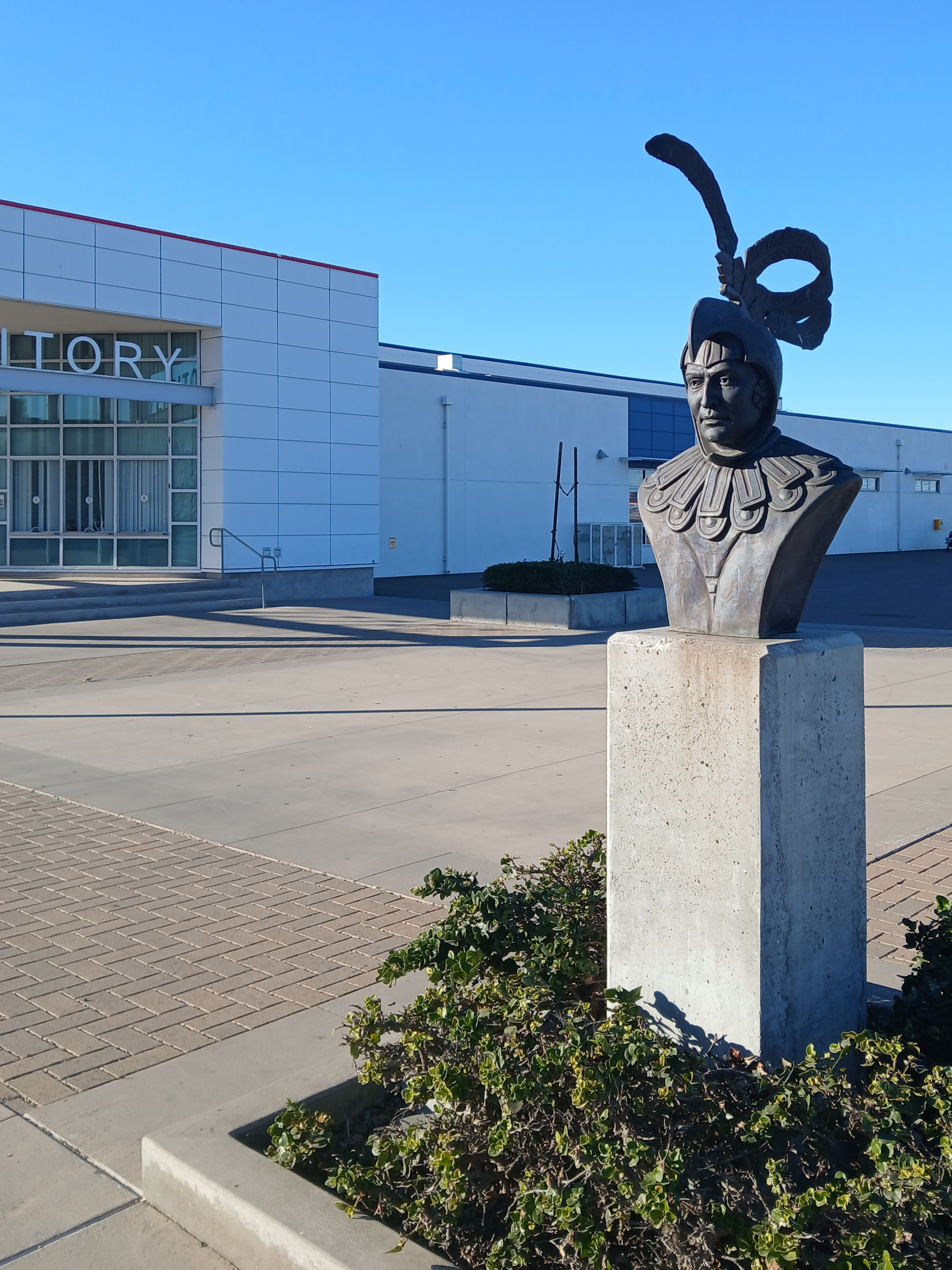
Aztec bust. Behind the bust, is the new basketball gym.

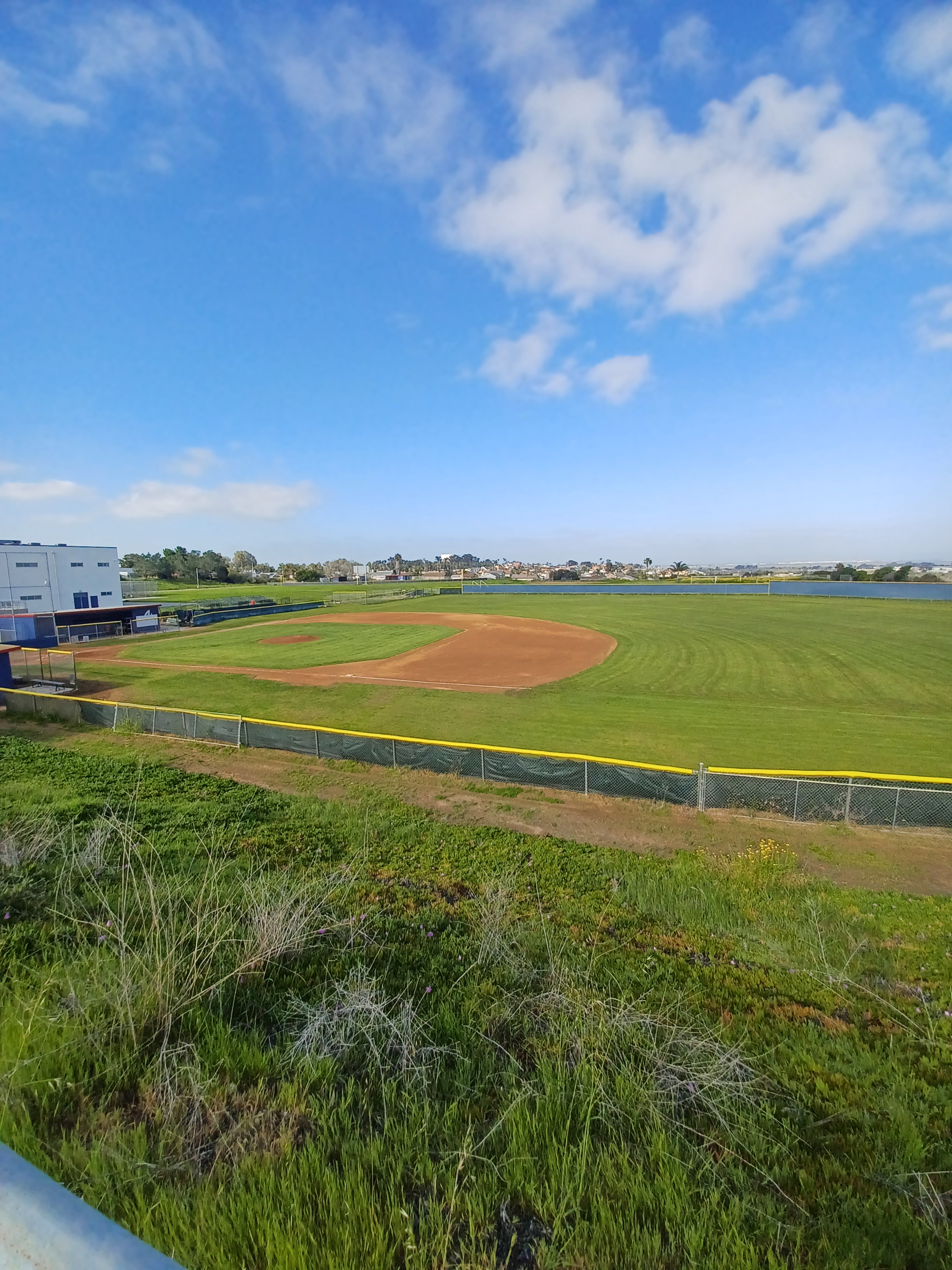
Montgomery's softball field, located north of the parking lot.

== Athletics ==
Montgomery offers a full range of athletic teams. These teams compete under the Aztec team name against other schools in the CIF-San Diego Section. The school participates in the Metro South Bay league against Hilltop, Bonita Vista, and Olympian high schools.

Fall	Winter	Spring
Fall High school football Girls Field hockey Girls Flag Football Girls & Boys Cross Country Girls Volleyball Girls Golf Girls Tennis Boys Water Polo	Girls & Boys Basketball Girls Water Polo Soccer Wrestling Cheer	Boys Tennis Football Boys Volleyball Girls & Boys Swimming Boys Golf Boys Baseball Girls Softball Track & Field Beach Volleyball

=== State champions ===
Year	Sport	Division	
2024	California high school basketball championship -Girls Southern California Champions	Division V	Montgomery (San Diego) def. Escondido Charter 55-51

== Notable alumni ==
Name	Grad Class	Category	Best Known For
Tony Walker	1977	Athlete	Professional baseball player
William McLeroy	1978	Other	Firefighter
Nora Vargas	1990	Politician	American politician
Wuv Bernardo	1991	Musician	Drummer for P.O.D.
Sonny Sandoval	1991	Musician	Singer for P.O.D.
Rey Mysterio	1993	Athlete	Professional wrestler
Óscar Robles	1994	Athlete	Professional baseball player
Sergio Mitre	1999	Athlete	Professional baseball player
Thunder Rosa	2006	Athlete	Professional wrestler
Alfredo Gutiérrez	2015	Athlete	Professional football player
Isiah King	2021	Athlete	Professional football player

== Notable faculty ==
- DeMarco Sampson
