= Montgomery Memorial =

Monument to glider flight in Otay, California, U.S.

Coordinates: 32°34′43″N 117°04′07″W

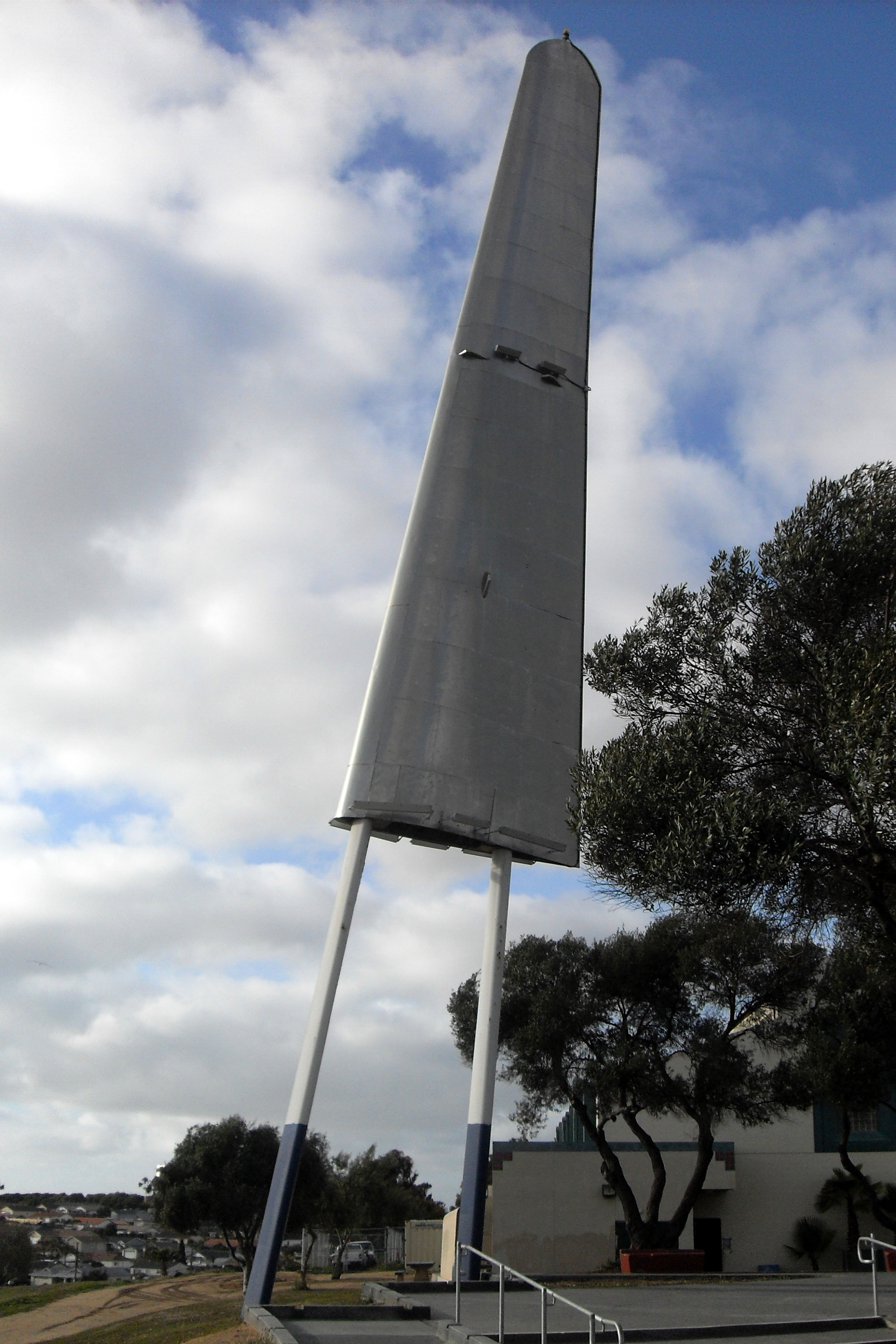
Silver Wing monument at Montgomery-Waller Recreation Center in Otay Mesa, San Diego, California

The Montgomery Memorial is a monument dedicated on May 21, 1950, to the pioneering aviation achievement of John J. Montgomery and his early glider flights in the 1880s in Otay Mesa, San Diego. It is situated adjacent to the Montgomery-Waller Recreation Center. The monument features a 93-foot high stainless steel static test wing panel for the Consolidated B-32 Dominator mounted upright that is visible for miles. Because of this feature, it is also sometimes referred to locally as Silver Wing.

== History ==
In 1945, the County of San Diego purchased 7 acres of land to develop a monument to honor John J. Montgomery. By March 1946, this was expanded through the acquisition of 18 adjacent acres for the development of Montgomery Park. The land acquisition process was led by Paul Mannen and Gordon Wiggins of the San Diego Junior Chamber of Commerce. Bob Wilson served as research chairman for the project, and he later became a Congressman representing California's 41st District. On April 1, 1946, Regina Cleary, Montgomery's widow visited San Diego to review the location and planned monument.

The monument was designed by pioneering modernist Lloyd Ruocco. Around the monument base is a terrazzo walk with the names of aviators who followed Montgomery set into the stone. Set nearby is a tablet with an inscription to Montgomery's winged flight.

The Montgomery Memorial was, officially dedicated on Sunday May 21, 1950, with John Montgomery's brother James Montgomery, and sister Jane Montgomery in attendance. Robert Wilson was the Chairman of the Montgomery Memorial Committee, with William Brotherton serving as Master of Ceremonies. Jerome Rudrauff presented the Memorial as President of the San Diego Junior Chamber of Commerce. It was formally accepted by James A. Robbins, Chairman of the San Diego County Board of Supervisors.

The Montgomery Memorial is recognized as a California Historical Landmark (#711).

It is also a Historic Landmark designated by the San Diego Historical Resources Board (#13).

The Montgomery Park land originally acquired by the San Diego Junior Chamber of Commerce became the Montgomery-Waller Recreational Center in 1964 following the donation of another parcel of land next to the site by the family of Luckie Waller for a park named after her son. In the 1970s, an early hang glider "Montgomery Meet" was held on the hill near the Monument.

In the 1970s another nearby recreation center was dedicated in the area as the Silver Wing Recreation Center.

== See also ==
- John J. Montgomery
