= Otay Ranch High School =

Public high school in Chula Vista, California, United States

Location
- 1250 Olympic Parkway; Chula Vista, California 91913; United States; 32°37′15″N 116°59′36″W

Information
- Type: Public
- Established: 2003
- School district: Sweetwater Union High School District
- Superintendent: Moisés G. Aguirre
- Principal: Julio Alcalá
- Teaching staff: 103.56 (FTE)
- Grades: 9-12
- Enrollment: 2,546 (2023-2024)
- Student to teacher ratio: 24.58
- Campus: Suburban
- Colors: Silver; Carolina blue Navy blue
- Athletics conference: Metropolitan - Mesa League
- Mascot: Monty the Mustang
- Nickname: Mustangs
- Rival: Olympian High School
- Newspaper: Mustang Corral
- Yearbook: Bigger, Better, Bluer
- TV Channel: KORTv
- Website: orh.sweetwaterschools.org

Otay Ranch High School (ORHS) is a public secondary school in Chula Vista, California. It primarily serves the Chula Vista developments of Otay Ranch and Rancho Del Rey.

== History ==
Otay Ranch High School was built in 2003 as a part of the Sweetwater Union High School District and first opened to 9th and 10th graders and later accommodated 11th and 12th graders. Otay Ranch High School originally opened to relieve overcrowding from surrounding schools such as San Ysidro High School and Eastlake High School. It serves students living in both the Otay Ranch and Rancho del Rey developments.

== Demographics ==
The following demographic information is drawn from state education reports for the 2012–2013 and 2018–2019 school years.

=== Enrollment by Ethnicity (2012–2013) ===
The school enrolled 2,789 students:

- Native American/Alaskan: 0.2%
- Asian/Pacific Islander: 22.3%
- Black: 4.7%
- Hispanic: 60.2%
- White: 8.4%
- Multiracial: 4.2%

Students eligible for free or reduced-price lunch: 22.7%.

=== Enrollment by Gender and Ethnicity (2018–2019) ===
The school enrolled 2,372 students:

- Male: 49.2%
- Female: 50.8%
- American Indian/Alaska Native: <0.1%
- Asian: 22.5%
- Black: 4.6%
- Hispanic: 59.7%
- Native Hawaiian/Pacific Islander: 0.3%
- White: 5.9%
- Multiracial: 8.0%

Students eligible for free or reduced-price lunch: 33.6%.

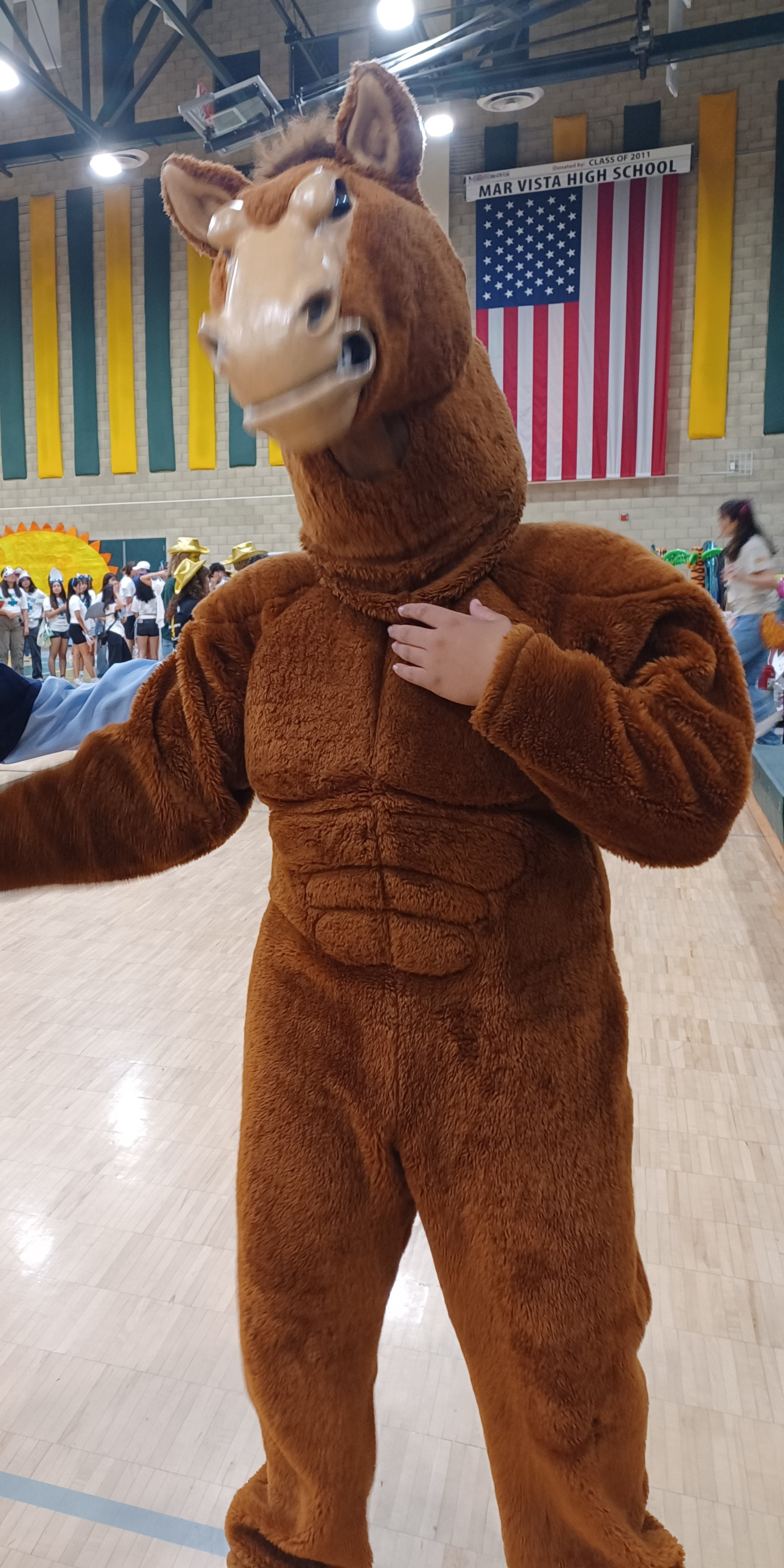
Monty the Mustang, mascot of Otay Ranch High School in Chula Vista, California.

== Athletics ==
The Otay Ranch Mustangs are member of the California Interscholastic Federation (CIF) and compete in the Metro Conference of the CIF San Diego Section.

Otay Ranch maintains a rivalry with nearby Olympian High School.

== Performing arts ==
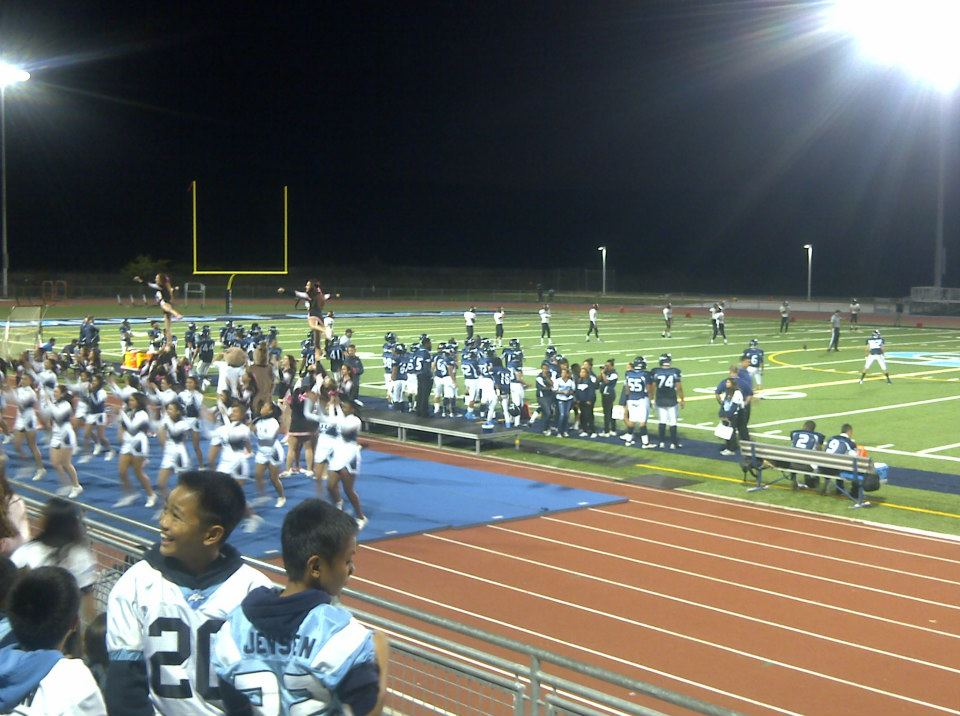
Homecoming Game 2012

Competitive show choir, "Full Effect".

Competitive hip-hop dance team, "All male and All female".

== Notable alumni ==
- Devin Lloyd, NFL linebacker
- Manny MUA, makeup artist and YouTuber
- Jennifer Paredes, actress
- Sashel Palacios, softball player
- Alex Pérez, basketball player
- Luis Perez, XFL quarterback
- Isalys Quiñones, basketball player
