= John Macaulay (American football) =

American football player (born 1959)

No. 67
- Position: Center

Personal information
- Born: April 27, 1959 (age 67); San Diego, California, U.S.
- Listed height: 6 ft 3 in (1.91 m)
- Listed weight: 254 lb (115 kg)

Career information
- High school: Bonita Vista (Chula Vista, California)
- College: Stanford (1978–1981)
- NFL draft: 1982: 11th round, 294th overall pick

Career history
- Green Bay Packers (1982)*; San Francisco 49ers (1983–1984)
- * Offseason or practice squad member only

Awards and highlights
- Super Bowl champion (XIX); First-team All-Pac-10 (1980); 2× Second-team All-Pac-10 (1978, 1981)

Career NFL statistics
- Games played: 3
- Stats at Pro Football Reference

John Dunn Macaulay (born April 27, 1959) is an American former professional football player who was a center for two seasons with the San Francisco 49ers of the National Football League (NFL). He was selected by the Green Bay Packers in the eleventh round of the 1982 NFL draft after playing college football for the Stanford Cardinal. He was a member of the 49ers team that won Super Bowl XIX.

== Early life and college ==
John Dunn Macaulay was born on April 27, 1959, in San Diego, California. He attended Bonita Vista High School in Chula Vista, California.

He lettered for the Cardinal at Stanford University from 1978 to 1981. He earned Associated Press first-team All-Pac-10 honors in 1980 and Coaches second-team All-Pac-10 honors in 1978 and 1981.

== Professional career ==
Macaulay was selected by the Green Bay Packers in the 11th round, with the 294th overall pick, of the 1982 NFL draft. He was released by the Packers on August 30, 1982.

Macaulay signed with the San Francisco 49ers on May 20, 1983. He was placed on injured reserve on August 23 and spent the entire 1983 season there. He was released by the 49ers on August 27, 1984, but re-signed on September 4 after Jeff Stover suffered a knee injury. Macaulay played in three games for the 49ers during the 1984 season.

== Personal life ==
Macaulay became a doctor and tech professional after his playing career. In June 2013, Macaulay had his Super Bowl ring returned to him after he had left it in an airport bathroom earlier in the day.
