= Olympique =

Olympique is the French word for 'Olympic', it may refer to several sports teams or other related articles:

== Teams ==
- Biarritz Olympique, rugby union club from Biarritz, France
- Castres Olympique, rugby union club from Castres, France
- Gatineau Olympiques, ice hockey club from Gatineau, Quebec, Canada
- Nîmes Olympique, football club from Nîmes, France
- Olympique Alès, football club from Alès, France
- Olympique Antibes, basketball club from Antibes, France
- Olympique Lyonnais, football club from Lyon, France
- Olympique de Marseille, football club from Marseille, France
- Olympique Nouméa, football club from New Caledonia
- Olympique de Paris, football club from Paris, France (1895–1926)
- Olympique Saint-Quentin, football club from Saint-Quentin, France
- Olympique Saumur, football club from Saumur, France
- Olympique de Valence, football club from Valence, France
- Toulouse Olympique, rugby league club from Toulouse, France

== Other ==
- Wolverhampton Olympique, motorcycle speedway competition in England
