= Orange High School =

Orange High School may refer to:

- Orange High School (Orange, California)
- Orange High School (Ohio)
- Orange High School (New Jersey)
- Orange High School (New South Wales)
- Orange High School (North Carolina)
- Orange High School (Orange, Virginia), designed by Charles Morrison Robinson and listed on the National Register of Historic Places

Orange High School may also refer to:

- West Orange-Cove Consolidated Independent School District, which once had an 'Orange High School.'
