= David Garza (soccer) =

American Paralympic footballer (born 1993)

Personal information
- Nationality: United States
- Born: April 24, 1993 (age 33) California

Sport
- Sport: Soccer / Cerebral palsy soccer, Volleyball

Achievements and titles
- Paralympic finals: 2012 Summer Paralympics
- Updated on 18 June 2016

David Garza (born April 24, 1993) is an American Paralympic soccer player. He attended California State University Dominguez Hills, and was involved in a car accident in his freshman year that left him with permanent paralysis on part of his body.

An active sportsperson, he was a two-sport athlete at Bonita Vista High School, playing boys varsity volleyball and soccer. He also played club soccer for the Chula Vista Rangers. He earned a spot on the California State University Dominguez Hills team, redshirting his freshman year.

Garza was with the United States Paralympic National Team in 2012, playing with the team at the 2012 Summer Paralympics. He went on to represent the US at the 2015 Cerebral Palsy Football World Championships, 2015 Parapan American Games and other 2016 Summer Paralympics qualifying efforts.

== Personal ==
Garza is from Chula Vista, California, and attended Bonita Vista High School.

Garza had a traumatic brain injury in May 2012 after his freshmen at university as result of a car accident. The accident left him in a coma for four and a half weeks. The extent of his injuries was such that doctors initially told him he would never be able to walk again. He has permanent paralysis on part of his result as a long term consequence of the accident. He attended California State University Dominguez Hills, graduating in May 2016 with Honors in Criminal Justice. While there, he was in the Army ROTC program at school for 4 years where he commissioned when he graduated from college into his top branch choice of Military Intelligence, where he is now the S6 for the 314th MI Bn.

Garza is 6 foot 3, and weighs 185 lbs.

== Volleyball ==
Garza played many sports besides soccer throughout his life but his secondary sport in high school was volleyball. He played volleyball in high school. Garza was a member of his school's boys varsity team from his sophomore year through his senior year (2008/2009-2010/2011) which he was then the team captain. He had a career hitting percentage of 0.398, 214 blocks, 111 digs, 447 kills and 69 aces. and played in the Metro Conference's annual all-star girls and boys volleyball games which he was the MVP. He played for the Mesa league in that game.

== Soccer ==
Garza started playing soccer at the age of 7 years old and played club soccer for the San Diego Nomads Academy and Chula Vista Rangers. He was first recruited to play for the U18 Cal South ODP team at the age of 16 after his three years of history making play at the top division of club soccer in san diego which was the Preisdio Premier league. He played varsity soccer starting is sophomore year at Bonita Vista High School as a goalie, midfielder and defender. He was the starting center defender on team that won its first California Division II title in over 21 years. He played for California State University Dominguez Hills, redshirting his freshman year. Other schools that tried to recruit him to play for their programs included UCLA, UCSB, CSUF, UC Irvine, Cal Lutheran, San Francisco State, CS Bakersfield and Cal State East Bay.

== Team USA ==
Garza is a CP6 classified footballer, playing as a midfielder and defender.

Garza captained the United States squad at the 2012 Summer Paralympics. National team coaches changed, and his January 2013 call up to participate in camp was the first one he did under the leadership of new coach Stuart Sharp. In April 2014, he was invited to participate in a week long national team training camp at the Olympic Training Center in Chula Vista, California. The camp was being held in preparation for the 7-a-side Football Ciutat de Barcelona in June of that year. He was invited to a national team training camp that took place from April 29 to May 6, 2015, in Carson, California. This camp was in preparation for the 2015 Cerebral Palsy Football World Championships in June of that year in England.

The 22-year-old captained the US side at the 2015 Cerebral Palsy World Championships, scoring two goals and one assist in the biggest game of his career which clinched Team USAs birth in the 2016 Summer Olympics in Rio de Janeiro, Brazil against Argentina. One of them came off a penalty kick after Argentine goalkeeper Gustavo Nahuelquin was red carded for kicking Adam Ballou. This performance qualified the United States for the 2016 Summer Paralympics. He also started in the USA's 2 - 1 win against Scotland. It was his first World Championships as a member of the national team. In Rio he started and played in game one vs Team Holland who was the #4 team in the world and highly favorite to win that game. It was a great comeback by Team USA to draw 2-2 which Garza playing one of the best games of his life blocking over 11 shots even after receiving a reckless slide tack by an opponent after his interception of the ball which unfortunately left him with a broken foot after 24 minutes into the game but continued to play the entire team on it and even ended the game as the team captain and MVP of the game.

Garza was part of the 14 man squad that represented the United States at the 2015 Parapan American Games in Toronto. There, the United States played Canada, Venezuela, Argentina and Brazil. H

Garza took part in a national team training camp in Chula Vista, California in early March 2016. In April 2016, he took part in a national team training camp in Bradenton, Florida in preparation for the May 2016 Pre Paralympic Tournament. He was part of the United States Paralympic National Team that took part in the 2016 Pre Paralympic Tournament in Salou, Spain. The United States finished 6th after beating Argentina in one placement match 4 - 3 where Garza scored the game-winning goal and completing a record breaking comeback where the team was down 3–0 at halftime, T He scored one of the United States's goals in their placement match against Argentina. The tournament featured 7 of the 8 teams participating in Rio. It was the last major preparation event ahead of the 2016 Rio Summer Olympics for all teams participating.
