= Olympic Conference =

Olympic Conference may refer to:

- Olympic Conference (Illinois)
- Olympic Conference (Indiana)
- Olympic Conference (New Jersey)

== See also ==
- Olympic Congress, a large gathering of representatives from the different constituencies of the Olympic Movement, organised by the International Olympic Committee
