= Olympic High School =

Olympic High School may refer to:

- Olympic High School — Concord, California
- Olympic High School — Santa Monica, California
- Olympic High School (Charlotte, North Carolina) — Charlotte, North Carolina
- Olympic High School (Silverdale, Washington) — Silverdale, Washington
- Olympic Vista High School — Chula Vista, California (now called Olympian High School)
