= Bonita Vista High School =

Public high school in Chula Vista, California, United States

Coordinates: 32°38′47.48″N 116°59′55.66″W

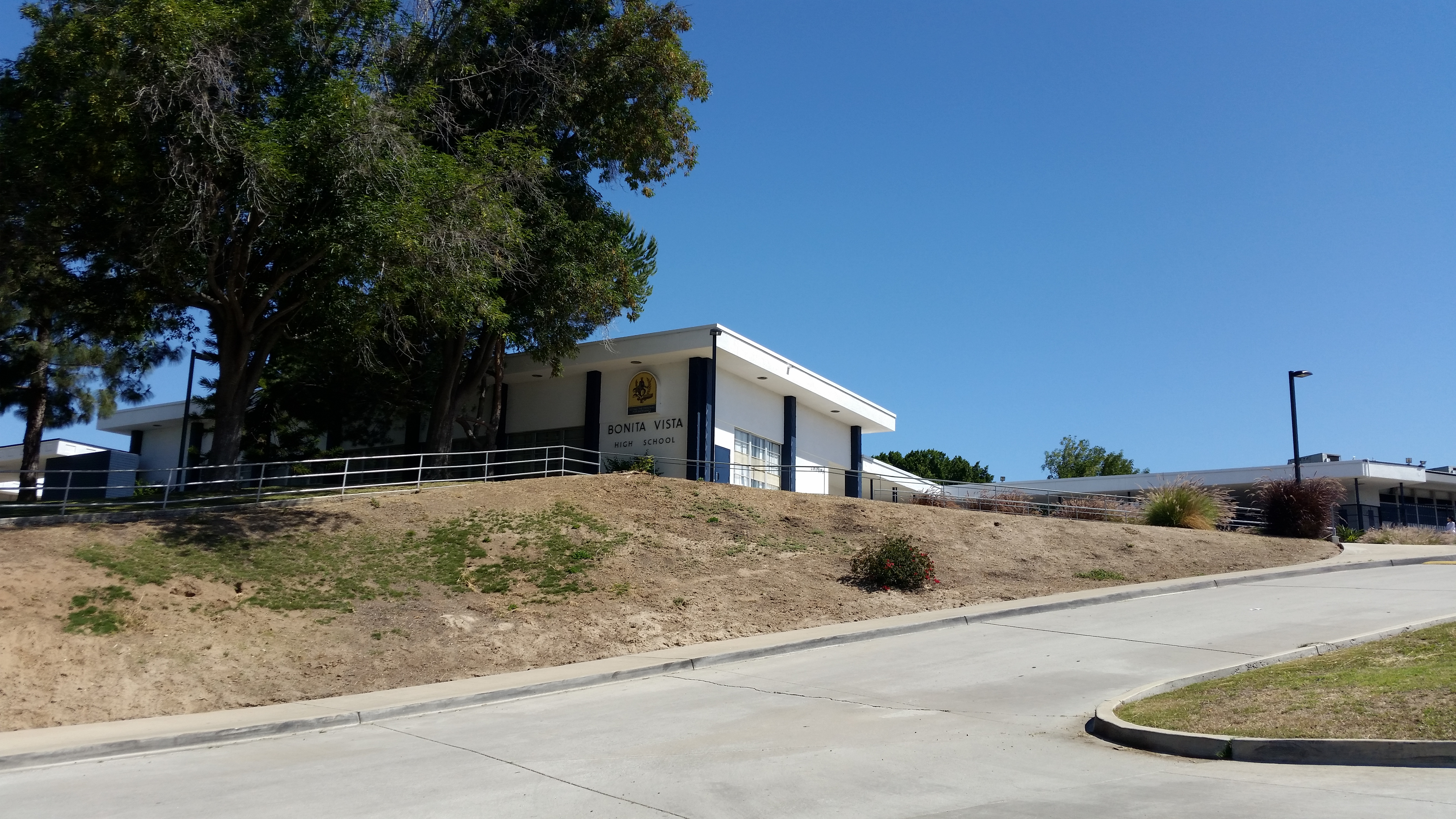
- School seen from the west entrance to the south parking lot

Location
- 751 Otay Lakes Road; Chula Vista, California 91913

Information
- Type: Public
- Established: 1966; 60 years ago
- School district: Sweetwater Union High School District
- Superintendent: Moisés G. Aguirre
- Principal: Alexander Salazar-Arbelaez
- Teaching staff: 90.29 (FTE)
- Enrollment: 1,960 (2024-2025)
- Student to teacher ratio: 21.71
- Campus: Suburban
- Colors: Navy Blue and Gold
- Nickname: Barons
- Newspaper: The Crusader
- Website: bvh.sweetwaterschools.org

Bonita Vista High School (BVH) is a public four-year high school in Chula Vista, California. It is part of Sweetwater Union High School District, and offers both Advanced Placement and International Baccalaureate classes. The mascot is a baron.

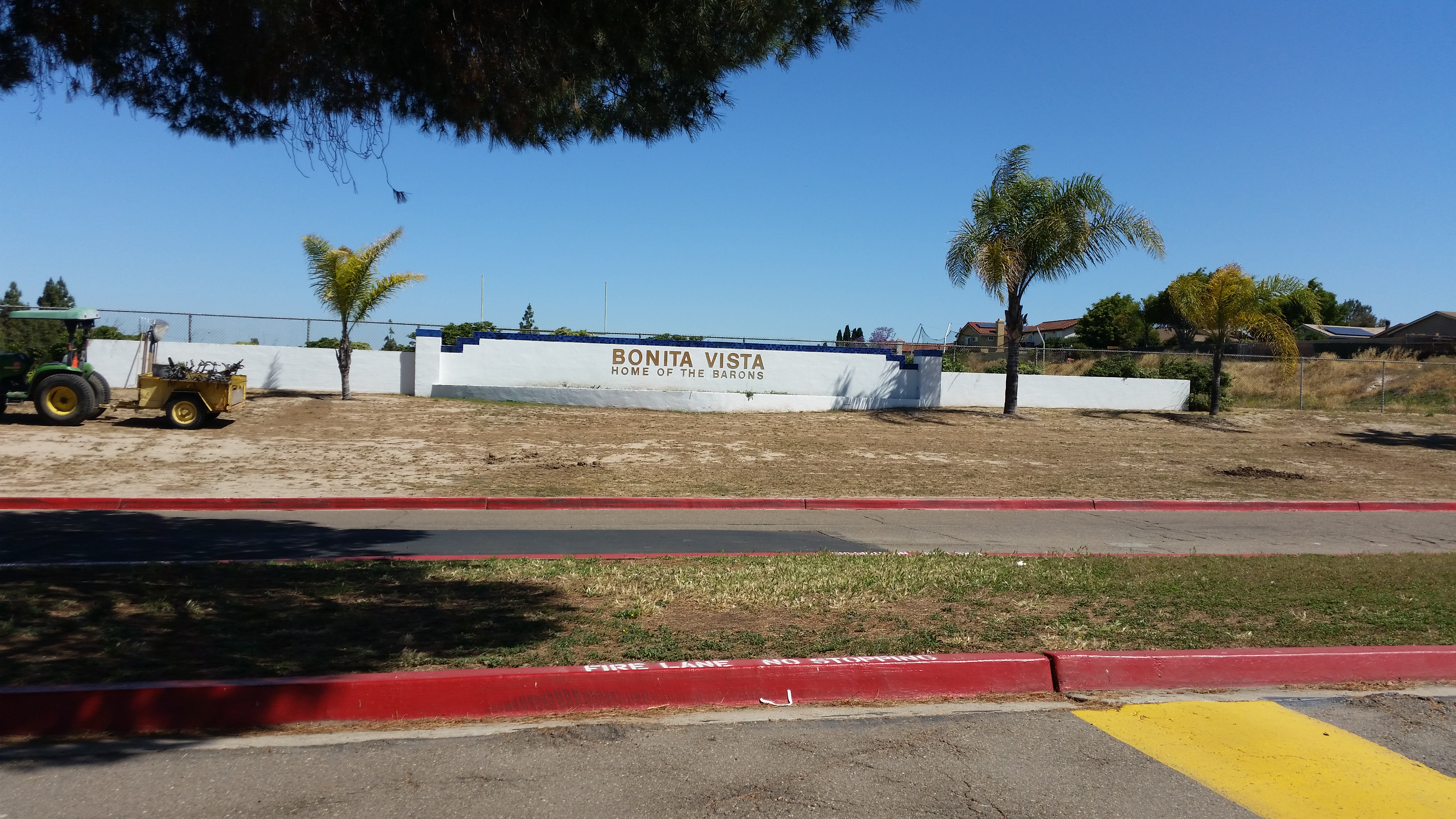
Bonita Vista High School in 2017

== History ==
Bonita Vista High School opened in the fall of 1966 at a construction cost of $2.5 million. A student committee chose the Baron mascot over a Patriot and a Crusader.

In December 2005, the district school board voted to remove the senior portfolio project as a graduation requirement following student protests. A co-salutatorian led students in arguing that the project lacked academic rigor, even submitting a satirical portfolio to highlight perceived deficiencies

== Academics ==
The school placed first in Sweetwater Union High School District for the 2011 school year, with an Academic Performance Index score of 851, meeting the statewide standard and exceeding amongst other schools in the same district.

== Athletics ==
In 2015, Baron athletic teams won California Interscholastic Federation championships in football and girls' tennis. The football team plays games off-campus at Southwestern College.

== Performing arts ==
BVH has two competitive show choirs, the mixed-gender group "The Music Machine" and the advanced women’s group "Sound Unlimited". The Music Machine and Sound Unlimited have both advanced to national-level competitions.

== Notable alumni ==
| Name | Grad Class | Category | Best Known For |
|---|---|---|---|
| Jenna Daniels | 1996 | Sports | Former American professional golfer, known for leading the University of Arizona to the 2000 NCAA Division I women's golf championship. Later played on the LPGA Tour from 2000 to 2007 before retiring. |
| Beth Accomando | 1978 | Journalism | Film critic |
| Marcos Curiel | 1992 | | |
| Greg Bell | 2016 | Sports | Professional football running back for the Hamilton Tiger-Cats in the Canadian Football League (CFL) |
| Matt Cameron | 1980 | Music | Drummer for Pearl Jam and Soundgarden |
| Charisma Carpenter | 1988 | Entertainment | Actress, best known for her role in Buffy the Vampire Slayer |
| Costa Dillon | | Entertainment | Writer, co-creator of the film Attack of the Killer Tomatoes |
| Hannah Flippen | | Sports | Softball player for the University of Utah |
| Byron Frisch | | Sports | Former NFL football player |
| David Garza | | Sports | Paralympic footballer, Team USA |
| Shirley Horton | | Politics | Politician, served as California State Assembly from the 78th district. |
| Guido Knudson | | Sports | Major League Baseball player |
| Jennifer Lalor | | Sports | Former soccer player and coach |
| John Macaulay | | Sports | NFL player |
| Ramon Martin Del Campo | | Sports | Soccer player |
| Monica Montgomery Steppe | | Politics | San Diego City Councilmember |
| Steve Peace | | Politics | Politician |
| Raquel Pomplun | | Entertainment | Playboy 2013 Playmate of the Year |
| David Schipper | | Sports | professional soccer player |
| Daniel Schneemann | 2015 | Sports | Major League Baseball player |
| Scott Shields | | Sports | football player |
| Joel Zumaya | | Sports | American baseball player |

== See also ==
- List of high schools in San Diego County, California
- List of high schools in California
