= Sweetwater Union High School District =

School district in California, United States

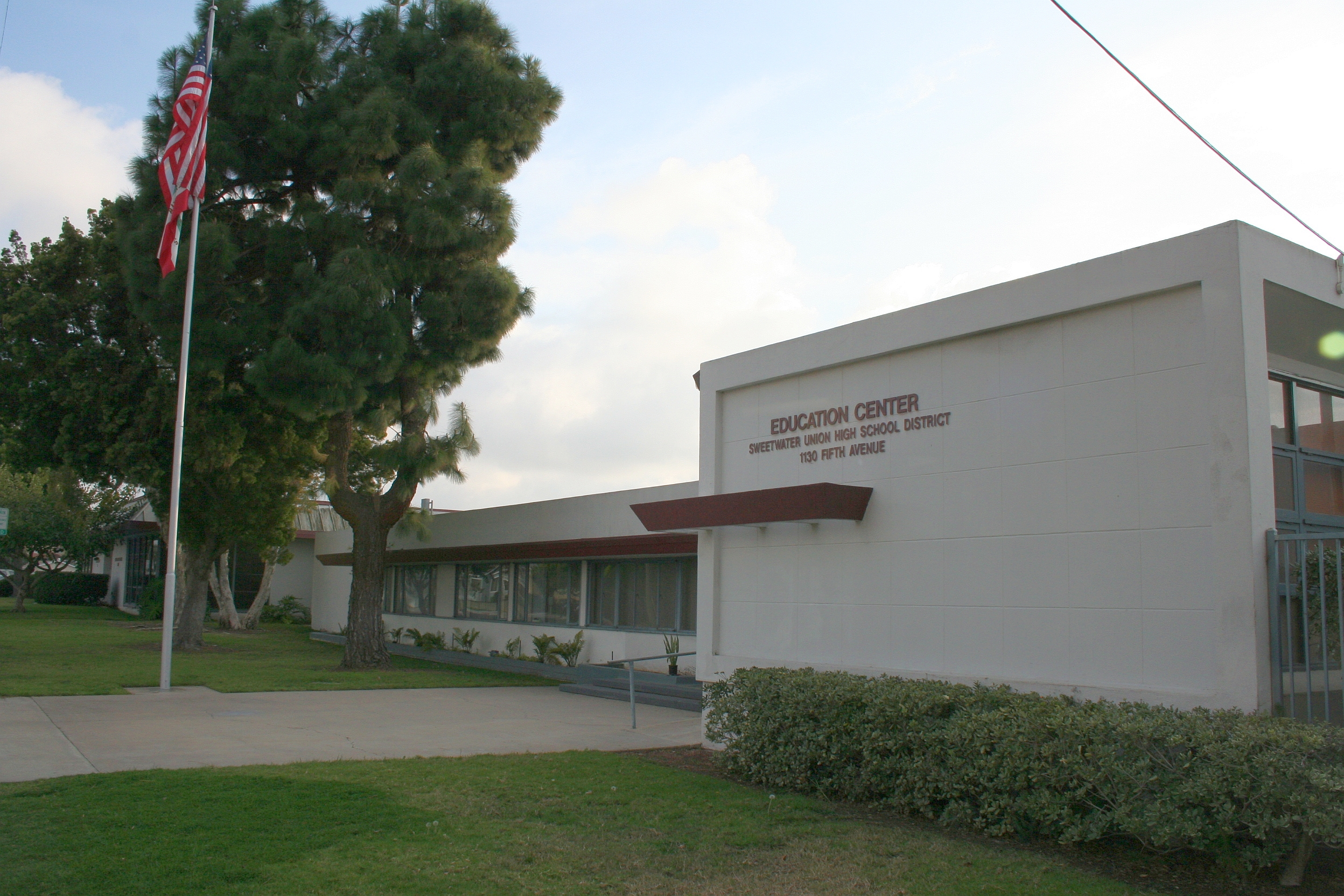
- District office in Chula Vista, California

Address
- 1130 Fifth Avenue Chula Vista, California, 91911; United States
- Coordinates: 32°36′35″N 117°04′37″W

District information
- Type: Public
- Grades: K - Adult
- Established: 1920; 106 years ago
- Superintendent: Moises Aguirre
- NCES District ID: 0638640

Students and staff
- Students: 38,553 (2019–2020)

Other information
- Website: sweetwaterschools.org

Sweetwater Union High School District (SUHSD) is a school district headquartered in Chula Vista, California. The union high school district serves over 42,000 high school-aged students and over 32,000 adult learners. Overseen by a five-member board of trustees, the district operates 14 high schools (11 regular, 2 alternative, 1 charter); 11 middle schools; 4 adult schools; a regional occupational program (ROP); and special education.

Located in the southwestern part of San Diego County between Southeast San Diego and Mexico, the district serves the cities of Chula Vista, Imperial Beach, National City, the exclave of South San Diego, the unincorporated community of Bonita and a portion of Coronado. It is one of the most ethnically and economically diverse districts in California. Approximately 87 percent of students belong to an ethnic minority group and over 40 percent of students qualify for the free or reduced lunch program.

The district has earned recognition for its "Compact for Success" program, a deal made with San Diego State University (SDSU) that guarantees Sweetwater graduates admission to the university if they meet certain requirements throughout their high school career.

== Schools ==
=== Adult School ===
- Chula Vista Adult School
- Montgomery Adult School
- National City Adult School
- San Ysidro Adult Education Center

=== Middle College Program ===
- Options Middle College High School (previously Options Secondary School) is a middle college school for students in grades 9-12, was previously located on the campus of Montgomery High School, it is ran under the "Alternative Education" division of the school district, which also runs the Independent Studies program. It has a small campus and a low ratio of students to teachers; in some cases, no more than twenty students in a class. In 2025, the school would be renamed to Options Middle College High School, and moved to Southwestern College's campus.

=== High schools ===
- Alta Vista Academy
- Bonita Vista High School
- Bounce Back Independent Study High - (Closed on June 11, 2012)
- Castle Park High School
- Chula Vista High School
- East Hills Academy
- Eastlake High School
- Hilltop High School
- Launch Virtual Academy
- LifeSchool
- MAAC Community Charter School
- Mar Vista High School
- Montgomery High School
- Olympian High School
- Otay Ranch High School
- Palomar High School
- San Ysidro High School
- Southwest High School
- Sweetwater High School

=== Junior High School ===
- Granger Junior High School (GJH) is a Junior High School (serving grades 7th-9th), located in National City, California. The campus was established in 1955 on Granger Avenue in the Lincoln Acres.

=== Middle Schools ===
- Bonita Vista Middle School
- Castle Park Middle School
- Chula Vista Middle School
- Eastlake Middle School
- Hilltop Middle School
- Mar Vista Academy
- Montgomery Middle School
- National City Middle School
- Rancho Del Rey Middle School
- Southwest Middle School

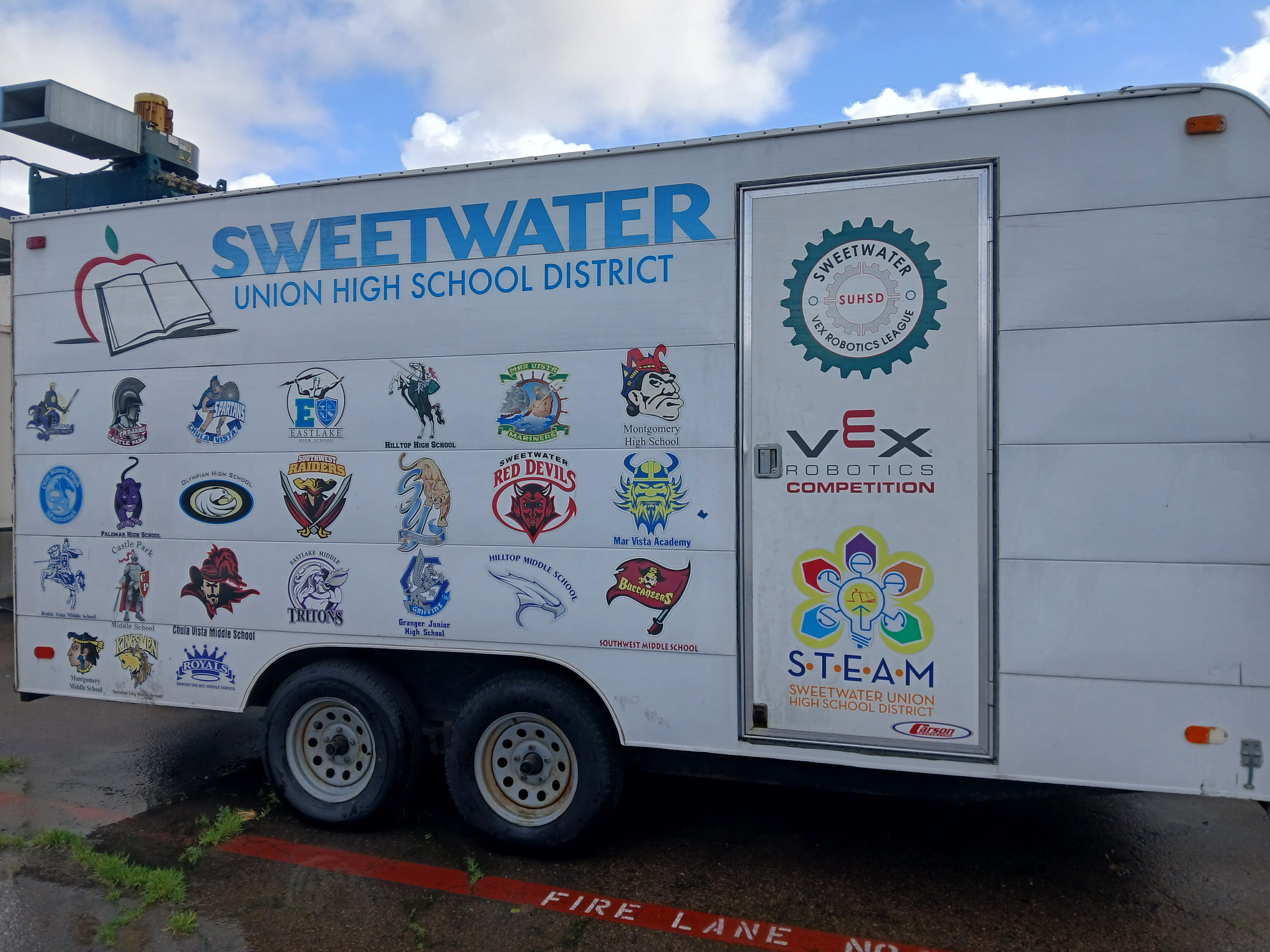
Sweetwater Union High School District VEX Robotics

== Compact for Success ==
In 1999, former Sweetwater Union School District superintendent Ed Brand met with once San Diego State University president Stephan Weber to try and overcome the small number of students enrolling and graduating from San Diego State University. To address this issue, Brand and Weber engineered the idea of a compact for success which would be a long-term partnership between Sweetwater Union School District and SDSU. Before Compact for Success could be put into execution, SDSU staff and Sweetwater School Board teachers worked with one another to alter the curriculum to concur with the requirements for college admission in California. After the curriculum was adjusted, students within Sweetwater Union School District would be guaranteed admission to San Diego State University if they could meet the five benchmarks set out by the partnership between Brand and Weber. To qualify for compact for success, students must remain in the district from 7th grade onward. Along with this, the requirements for admission are: maintaining a 3.0 GPA, fulfilling all A-G requirements, passing the English and Math proficiency test, and lastly, taking either the SAT or ACT. Along with guaranteed admission through the program, students from 7th grade onward will take multiple field trips to San Diego State University and will have mentors along the way to help guide students by helping them prepare for higher education at a university. Compact for Success went into the execution in the fall of 2000 and with that year incoming 7th graders enrolled in the district. From 2000 to 2012, compact for success has caused an 87% increase in Sweetwater students enrolling in San Diego State University; applications increased from 789 in 2000 to 1,770 in 2012. As of 2012 compact of success has resulted in 1 of every 7 SDSU students being former Sweetwater School district students. Compact for Success was recognized in June 2012 by National Journal as a "leading innovator" in higher education and has served as a template for other programs. This partnership has influenced other ones around San Diego County, such as the one between Vista Unified School District and California State University San Marcos.
