= Olympian High School =

Public high school in Chula Vista, California, United States

Location
- 1925 Magdalena Avenue; Chula Vista, California 91913; United States; 32°36′28″N 116°58′25″W

Information
- School type: Public high school
- Motto: "Where Champions Are Made"
- Established: August 7, 2006; 20 years ago
- School district: Sweetwater Union High School District
- NCES District ID: 0638640
- Superintendent: Moisés G. Aguirre
- CEEB code: 054072
- NCES School ID: 063864011768
- Principal: Viky Mitrovich
- Teaching staff: 96.62 (FTE)
- Grades: 9-12
- Enrollment: 2,324 (2023-2024)
- Student to teacher ratio: 24.05
- Color
- Song: "We Eagles"
- Fight song: "Eagles Fight!"
- Nickname: Eagles
- Rival: Otay Ranch High School
- Website: Official website

Olympian High School (OHS) is a public secondary school in the Otay Ranch area of Chula Vista, California. It opened in 2006 as part of the Sweetwater Union High School District to serve the city’s growing eastern communities. The campus mascot is Ollie the Eagle and the school colors are black, teal, and “Vegas” gold. As of the 2023–24 school year, Olympian High enrolls roughly 2,324 students. The student body is predominantly Latino (about 45%) and Asian (about 26%), with smaller White (13%), Black (8%), and multiracial (7%) populations. Olympian is part of the California Interscholastic Federation (CIF) and has become one of the district’s top-performing high schools academically and athletically.

== History ==
=== Founding and opening (2006) ===
Olympian High School opened in August 2006 in the rapidly growing Otay Ranch area of Chula Vista, California. It was established by the Sweetwater Union High School District to accommodate a surge in new housing and population in eastern Chula Vista during the early 2000s. As the district’s newest high school (and the last built as of the 2010s), Olympian High was intended to relieve overcrowding at existing schools like Eastlake and Otay Ranch High. The campus initially welcomed only 9th and 10th grade students, with additional grade levels added in the following two years. The first senior class graduated in spring 2009, marking an early milestone for the young school.

Olympian High’s campus opened with core classroom buildings and a multipurpose facility, but some amenities were phased in over time. In its inaugural year, the school did not yet have a senior class or established varsity programs, and some athletic facilities were still under development.

=== Growth and campus development (2010s) ===
By 2010, Olympian High was a fully established 9–12 high school and was rapidly expanding. Elaine Elefante-Leano became principal in 2010, succeeding DeVore. At that time Olympian was “the newest school” in the district. During her four-year tenure, Olympian’s academic performance rose notably – the school was soon ranked among the top 500 high schools in the nation and top 100 in California, an achievement reflecting high test scores and college readiness indicators. The faculty and staff established an “uncompromising belief” in a rigorous, college- and career-focused curriculum during these years. In 2013, Olympian High earned full accreditation from WASC, validating the strength of its new programs.

Throughout the 2010s, Olympian High had to contend with continual growth in eastern Chula Vista. Enrollment climbed steeply, reflecting new housing development. Between 2010 and 2017, the student population grew from about 1,732 to over 2,600. This surge led the district to install additional portable classroom buildings on campus to expand capacity. By 2017, Olympian High was operating above its original design capacity, and the district discussed plans for another new high school to relieve crowding.

== School structure ==
Instruction is organized through traditional academic departments. The school offers special education, counseling services, and English learner support.

=== Accreditation ===
In 2022, the Western Association of Schools and Colleges granted Olympian High a six-year accreditation term.

=== Demographics ===
Data from the National Center for Education Statistics (2023–24). Olympian High School enrolled 2,324 students during the 2023–24 school year.

==== Enrollment by race/ethnicity ====
Group	Students	Percentage
Hispanic/Latino	1,037	45%
Asian	606	26%
White	306	13%
Black	189	8%
Two or more races	174	7%
American Indian/Alaska Native	9	<1%
Native Hawaiian/Pacific Islander	3	<1%

==== Enrollment by gender ====
Gender	Students	Percentage
Male	1,224	53%
Female	1,100	47%

==== Additional indicators ====
- AP participation rate: 60%
- Total minority enrollment: 86%
- Economically disadvantaged: 25% of students

== Curriculum ==
Olympian High follows the California state curriculum framework. The school offers more than 18 Advanced Placement (AP) courses. Approximately 50% of Olympian students take at least one AP course during their high school career, reflecting a high level of AP participation. The school hosts Project Lead The Way (PLTW) programs in engineering and computer science. Engineering pathway courses include Introduction to Engineering Design, Principles of Engineering, Digital Electronics, and Civil Engineering & Architecture, while the computer science sequence offers Computer Science Principles and AP Computer Science A. Olympian provides a variety of career technical education (CTE) electives such as business (e.g. Business Technology), media arts (Graphic Design, Multimedia, TV/Film production), and a three-year Sports Medicine program.

== Extracurricular activities ==
=== Athletics ===
Olympian High competes in the CIF San Diego Section as a member of the Metro Conference. The school’s teams are known as the Eagles.

- The cheerleading team won a national title in 2017.

Olympian maintains a rivalry with nearby Otay Ranch High School.

== Campus ==
The 52-acre campus includes classroom buildings, science labs, a performing arts center, and various athletic facilities. The main gymnasium seats about 2,216 spectators. Outdoor facilities include a football/soccer stadium with an eight-lane track and seating for about 3,026. Additional facilities include baseball and softball fields, tennis courts, and a weight-training center.

== Awards and recognition ==
The “Common Senior Experience” project received a Golden Bell Award from the California School Boards Association in 2010. In 2011, Olympian was named a California Distinguished School. U.S. News & World Report has ranked the school among the higher-performing public high schools in the state and nation (in the 2024 rankings, it was listed as #238 in California (top ~15%) and #1,683 nationally.) According to California’s Smarter Balanced assessments, 75.5% of Olympian’s 11th-grade students met or exceeded the proficiency standard in English Language Arts, and 50.9% did so in Mathematics, (compared to roughly 57% and 30% statewide).

== Notable alumni ==
- Sergio Bailey (2013), American football player, NFL, wide receiver

== Former principals ==
The following people have served as principal of Olympian High School:

No.	Principal	Years Served	Notes
1.	John C. DeVore	2006–2010	Founding principal of OHS, returned as interim principal in 2014.
2.	Elaine Elefante-Leano	2010–2014	
3.	Dianne Huslin	2014–2022	
4.	Viky Mitrovich	2022—Present	
