= Rancho del Otay Airfield =

Airfield in Chula Vista, California

Coordinates: 32.646°N 116.942°W

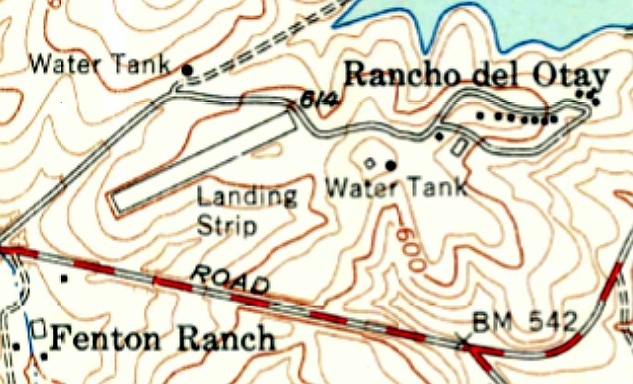
USGS map of Rancho del Otay Airfield from 1955

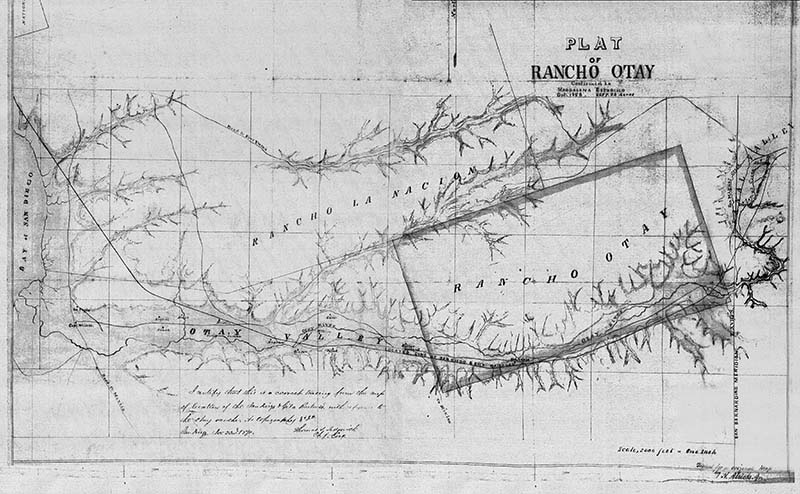
Rancho Otay map from 1870

Rancho del Otay Airfield was a private runway in Chula Vista, California on Rancho del Otay. Industrialist Stephen Birch owned and built Rancho del Otay on 29,000 acre of land just west of the Lower Otay Reservoir. The land Stephen Birch purchased in 1939 was part of the vast Rancho Otay. Stephen Birch died in 1940 and his daughter Mary inherited 11 acres of Rancho del Otay. Mary had a large cattle and agricultural ranch on the land, first called Otay Agricultural Corporation and later United Enterprises. Mary ferried US built planes to England during World War 2 and built a short runway on here land. Mary Birch married Patrick R. Patrick in 1955 and moved into the Spreckels hunting lodge. Patrick was a retired wing commander in the Royal Air Force. In 1984 Mary donated land to the Chula Vista Community Hospital, now the Sharp Chula Vista Medical Center. After Mary Birch death on November 20, 1983, the ranch was purchased in 1988 by the Baldwin Company for development. Mary's estate was in San Diego County probate court case for years. In the end the land was divided to relatives, friends, and former employees. The airfield was abandoned and is now surrounded by homes. The airfield is located east of the intersection of Otay Lakes Road & Woods Drive.
