= Gaylord Hotels =

Hotel chain owned by Marriott

- Formerly: Opryland Hotels
- Type: Subsidiary
- Industry: Hospitality
- Founded: November 24, 1977; 48 years ago
- Founder: Ryman Hospitality Properties
- Headquarters: Bethesda, Maryland, U.S.
- Number of locations: 6 (2025)
- Area served: United States
- Parent: Marriott International
- Website: https://www.gaylordhotels.com/

Gaylord Hotels is a full service hotel and convention center brand owned by Marriott International and Ryman Hospitality Properties. As of 2025, there are 6 properties, all of which are in the United States.

== History ==
=== Pre-Gaylord era ===
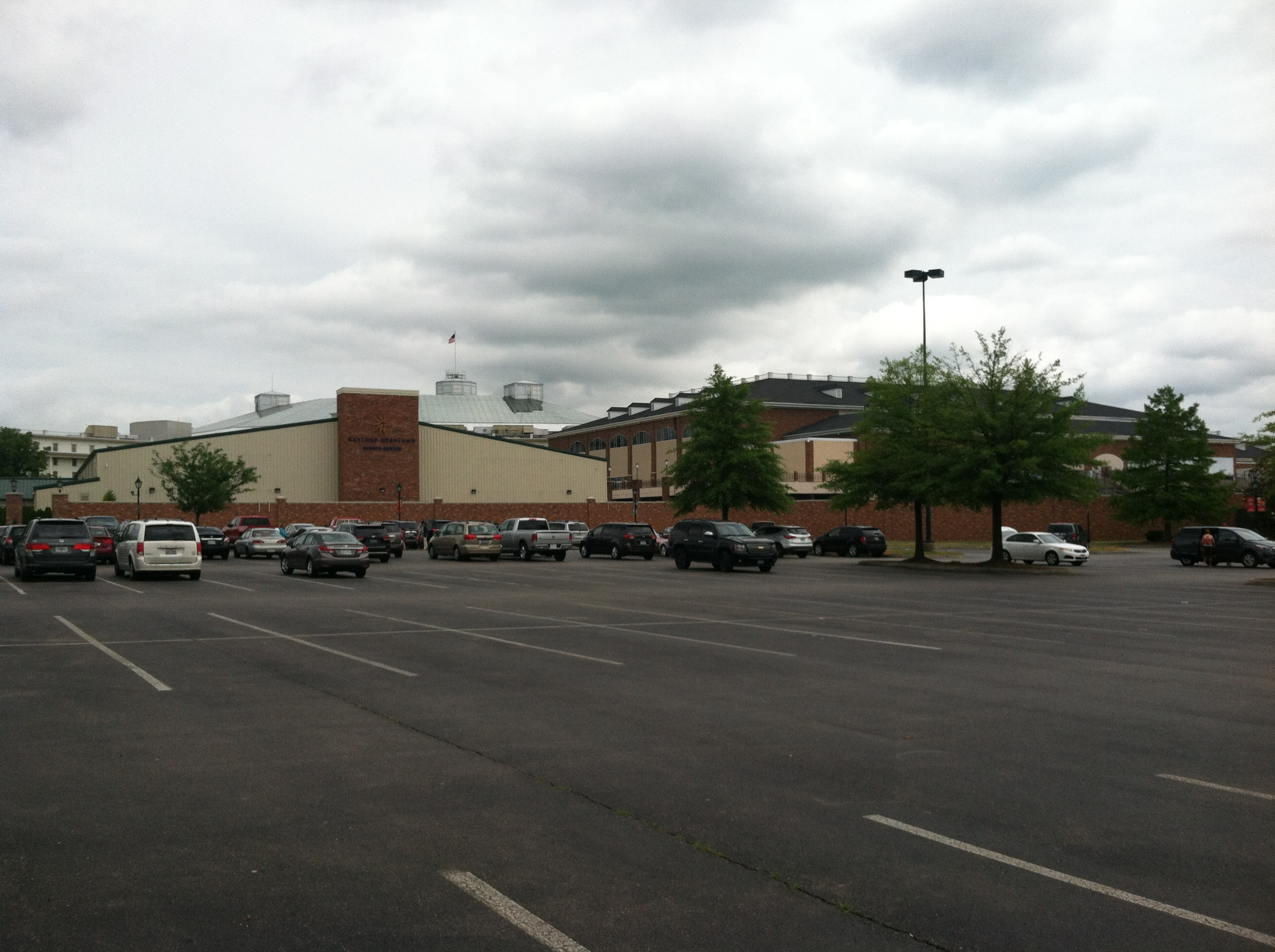
The original Opryland Hotel, still in operation.

The earliest trace of Gaylord Hotels was in 1925, when Edward Gaylord established the Gaylord Broadcasting Company. On November 24, 1977, the Opryland Hotel opened to support the Grand Ole Opry in Nashville, Tennessee. Later in 1983, GBC acquired WSM, Inc., which included the Opryland Hotel. Following the acquisition, WSM, Inc. was renamed to Opryland USA, Inc. In 1991, GBC went public, renaming the company to Gaylord Entertainment.

=== Gaylord era ===
In October 26, 2001, Gaylord Entertainment announced that the Opryland Hotels subdivision would be renamed to Gaylord Hotels. Shortly after in 2002, the second property, called Gaylord Palms opened, and two years later in 2004, Gaylord Texan opened to the public, and in 2008, Gaylord National in National Harbor, Maryland opened.

=== Marriott acquisition and continued growth ===
On October 1, 2012, Marriott International acquired Gaylord Hotels for $210 million. This then led to Gaylord Entertainment being renamed to Ryman Hospitality Properties, but all Gaylord properties would still be operated by Ryman, but will be owned by Marriott. The brand was then implemented into Marriott Rewards. Two months later, Marriott took over management of the Radisson Hotel Opryland, effectively renaming it "The Inn at Opryland, a Gaylord Hotel." Later in 2018, Gaylord Rockies opened in Aurora, Colorado.

In May 2025, the Gaylord Pacific Resort & Convention Center, after almost 2 decades in the making, finally opened to the public as the first Gaylord property on the West Coast.

== Properties ==
As of 2025, Gaylord Hotels currently has 6 properties across the United States.

Name	City	Opening Date	Status	Notes
Gaylord Opryland Resort & Convention Center	Nashville, Tennessee	November 24, 1977	Operating	The very first Gaylord property.
Gaylord Palms Resort & Convention Center	Kissimmee, Florida	February 2, 2002	Operating	The first Gaylord property to open under the Gaylord name.
Gaylord Texan Resort Hotel & Convention Center	Grapevine, Texas	April 2, 2004	Operating	
Gaylord National Resort & Convention Center	National Harbor, Maryland	April 1, 2008	Operating	
Gaylord Rockies Resort & Convention Center	Aurora, Colorado	December 18, 2018	Operating	An expansion project to add 450 rooms, a new indoor water amenity, and a parking garage was announced in 2026.
Gaylord Pacific Resort & Convention Center	Chula Vista, California	May 15, 2025	Operating	The first Gaylord property on the West Coast.
