= Gaylord Convention Center =

Gaylord Convention Center may refer to:

- Gaylord Palms Resort & Convention Center, in Kissimmee, Florida
- Gaylord Opryland Resort & Convention Center, in Nashville, Tennessee
- Gaylord National Resort & Convention Center, in National Harbor, Maryland
- Gaylord Texan Resort Hotel & Convention Center, in Grapevine, Texas
- Gaylord Pacific Resort & Convention Center, in Chula Vista, California
