= Savage Dam =

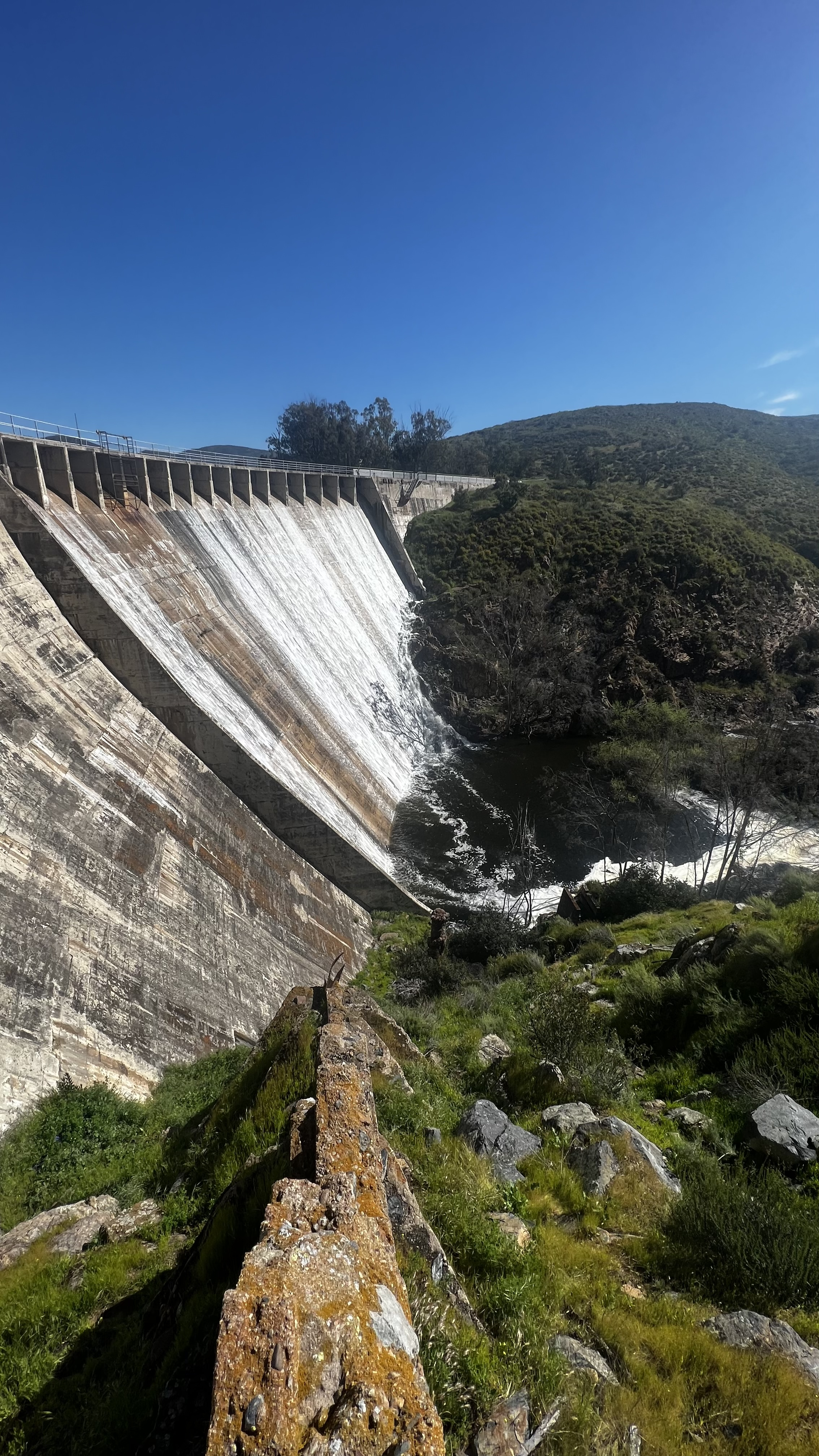
- Interactive map of Savage Dam
- Country: United States
- Location: San Diego County, California
- Coordinates: 32°36′38″N 116°55′29″W
- Status: In use
- Construction began: 1916; 110 years ago
- Opening date: 1918; 108 years ago
- Owner: City of San Diego

Dam and spillways
- Type of dam: Concrete arch gravity
- Impounds: Otay River
- Height: 149 feet (45 m)
- Length: 750 feet (230 m)

Reservoir
- Creates: Lower Otay Reservoir
- Total capacity: 49,510 acre-feet (61,070,000 m^{3})
- Catchment area: 101.2 square miles (262 km^{2})
- Surface area: 1,090 acres (440 ha)

Power Station
- Hydraulic head: 120 feet (37 m)

Savage Dam is a dam across the Otay River in the San Ysidro Mountains of southwestern San Diego County, California. It is a concrete arch gravity structure 149 feet (45 m) high, and serves to store water from the San Diego Aqueduct's third pipeline for backup municipal uses in the San Diego metropolitan area. It is just over 6 miles (9.7 km) southeast of Chula Vista and 4 miles (6.4 km) north of the Mexico–United States border. The dam is named in honor of H. N. Savage, who directed its construction.

The dam was originally completed in 1897 as an earthfill and steel structure called Otay Dam by the Southern California Mountain Water Company to provide water storage. However, in 1916, heavy rains supposedly brought on by Charles Hatfield, a "rainmaker", hired by the city of San Diego to put an end to a drought, caused the dam to burst. The failure sent a wall of water 40 feet (12 m) high downstream, destroying buildings and bridges, and washing thousands of tons of sediment and wreckage into San Diego Bay. 11 Japanese American farmers were killed. The dam was rebuilt as Savage Dam in 1918, and has functioned properly since.

== See also ==
- List of reservoirs and dams in California
