= PVM (disambiguation) =

PVM may refer to:

- Parallel Virtual Machine, a software tool for parallel networking of computers
- Paged Virtual Memory, a memory addressing scheme that allows non-contiguous memory to be addressed as if it were contiguous
- Party of the Vlachs of Macedonia, a political party representing the Aromanians (Vlachs) of North Macedonia
- Player versus monster, also known as player versus environment, in video games
- Place Ville Marie, an office complex in Montreal
- Proctor Valley Monster, an urban legend from Proctor Valley, east of San Diego, California
- Projection-valued measure, a type of measure used in functional analysis
- Perfetti Van Melle, an Italian-Dutch manufacturer of confectionery and gum
- Pro Virtute Medal, a South African military decoration for bravery
- Professional Video Monitor, professional displays made by Sony for video production
- Future of Moldova Party, a Moldovan political party named Partidul Viitorul Moldovei in Romanian
