= Proctor Valley =

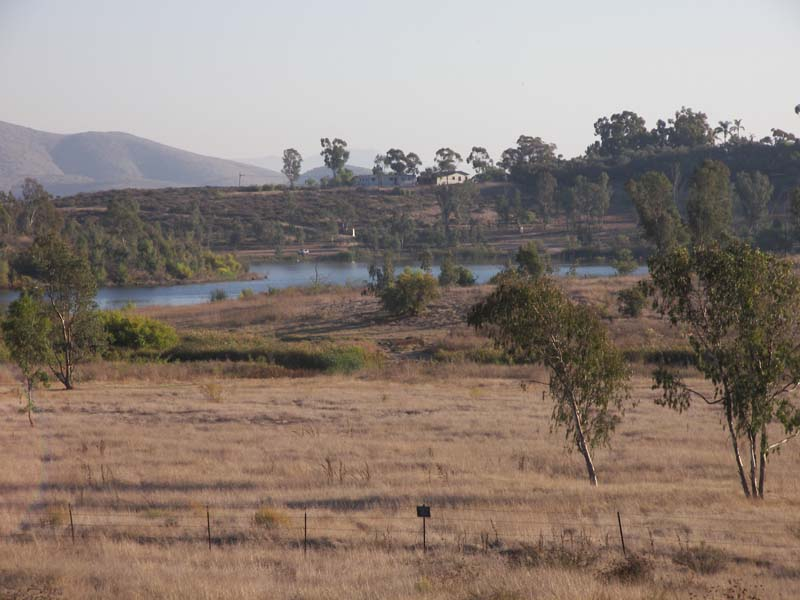
Proctor Valley, Chula Vista

Proctor Valley is a valley in southwestern San Diego County, California, United States. It is traversed by Proctor Valley Road, a dirt road which connects the community of Jamul in the northeast to the Eastlake neighborhood of Chula Vista in the southwest.

The valley, home to various unique plant and animal species, is gradually being encroached upon by suburban development. It contains populations of the federally threatened plant Deinandra conjugens.

The Proctor Valley Monster is said to inhabit the valley and the road that goes through it connecting Eastlake to Jamul.
