= Proctor Valley Monster =

Folkloric Creature of San Diego County

Origin
- Country: United States
- Region: San Diego County
- Habitat: Proctor Valley

The Proctor Valley Monster is a cryptid reputed to live in Proctor Valley, California. Sightings tend to link the monster to the Proctor Valley Road, a dirt road that connects the community of Jamul in the northeast to the Eastlake neighborhood of Chula Vista in the southwest.

== Description ==
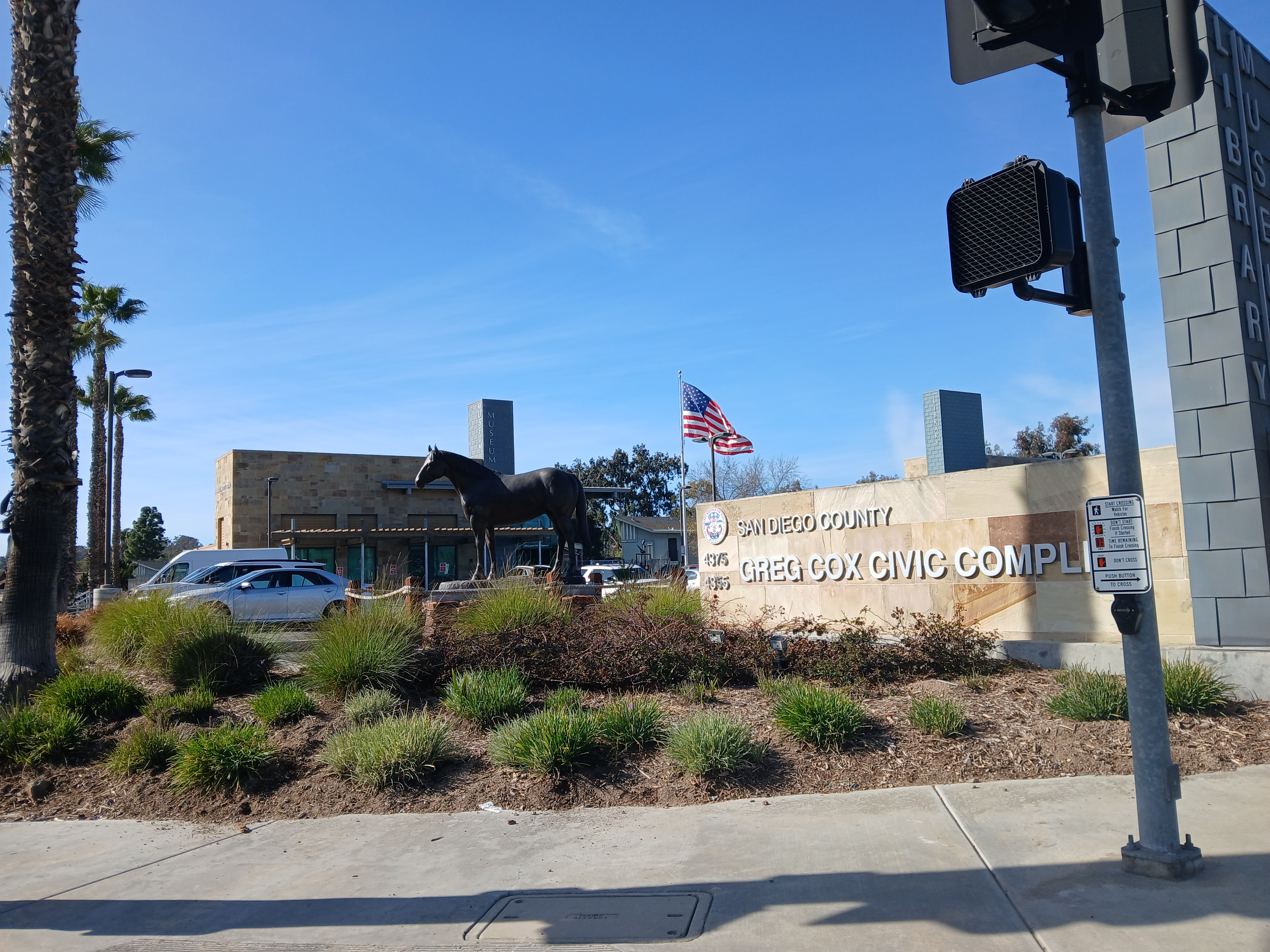
Visible in the background are the Bonita–Sunnyside Library and the Bonita Museum & Cultural Center.

The cryptid's appearance is still debated by locals. Accounts vary, but two of the most agreed-upon versions of the creature are of a tall, hairy, Bigfoot-type, or a "disarranged cow" bovine type. The nearby Bonita Museum & Cultural Center claims to have an unknown humanoid footprint on display, which many locals interpet as concrete evidence of the cryptid's existence.

== In popular culture ==
The Proctor Valley Monster has inspired a comic book series produced by Boom! Studios titled "Proctor Valley Road" in which the cryptid is blamed for the disappearances of a group of students participating in a Ghost Tour of the road.

The Bonita Museum & Cultural Center has hosted Film Festivals dedicated to celebrating the Proctor Valley Monster.
