= Chula Vista Elementary School District =

School district in California, United States

Address
- 84 East J Street Chula Vista, California, 91910; United States

District information
- Type: Public
- Grades: K–6
- Established: 1892
- Schools: 42
- NCES District ID: 0608610

Students and staff
- Students: 22,452 (2020–2021)
- Teachers: 1,009.57 (FTE)
- Staff: 1,209.15 (FTE)
- Student–teacher ratio: 22.24:1

Other information
- Website: www.cvesd.org

Chula Vista Elementary School District (CVESD) is a public school district based in Chula Vista, California. The 103-square-mile (270 km^{2}) district, the largest K–6 district in California, is located between San Diego and the Mexico–United States border. In addition to almost all of Chula Vista, the district includes Bonita, portions of San Diego, and a small area of National City.

== Demographics ==
As of the 2011–2012 school year, the school district has 27,700 students. Of them, 45% take free or reduced lunch and 35% are English learners. In regards to race and ethnicity, 68% are Hispanic, 13% are White, 11% are Filipino, 4% are African American, 3% are Asian or Pacific Islander, and 1% are other.

== Schools ==
- Ella B. Allen Elementary School
- Arroyo Vista Charter School
- Casillas Elementary School
- Castle Park Elementary School
- Chula Vista Hills Elementary School
- Chula Vista Learning Community Charter School
- Clear View Elementary School
- Hazel Goes Cook Elementary School
- Daly Academy
- Discovery Charter School
- Eastlake Elementary School
- Feaster Charter School
- Myrtle S. Finney Elementary School
- Halecrest Elementary School
- Harborside Elementary School
- Anne & William Hedenkamp
- Heritage Elementary School
- Hilltop Drive Elementary School
- Fahari L. Jeffers Elementary School
- Juarez-Lincoln Elementary School
- Karl H. Kellogg Elementary School
- J. Calvin Lauderbach Elementary School
- Liberty Elementary School
- Loma Verde Elementary School
- Los Altos Elementary School
- Thurgood Marshall Elementary School
- Corky McMillin Elementary School
- John J. Montgomery Elementary School
- Mueller Charter School Elementary School
- Olympic View Elementary School
- Otay Elementary School
- Palomar Elementary School
- Parkview Elementary School
- Lilian J. Rice Elementary School
- Rogers Elementary School
- Fred H. Rohr Elementary School
- Rosebank Elementary School
- Saburo Muraoka Elementary School
- Salt Creek Elementary School
- Silver Wing Elementary School
- Sunnyside Elementary School
- Burton C. Tiffany Elementary School
- Valle Lindo Elementary School
- Valley Vista Elementary School
- Veterans Elementary School
- Vista Square Elementary School
- Wolf Canyon Elementary School

Casillas Elementary School is named after Joseph Casillas, a World War II combat veteran that was awarded the Silver Star and a Purple Heart. Joseph Casillas was shot in the head and arm while saving his squad during the Battle of the Bulge. He was also captured by Germans, but later rescued by American forces after German troops retreated from their positions.

Independent Charter Schools Located within CVESD Boundaries

- Leonardo da Vinci Health Sciences Charter School
- Howard Gardner Community Charter School
