= The Vogue Theater =

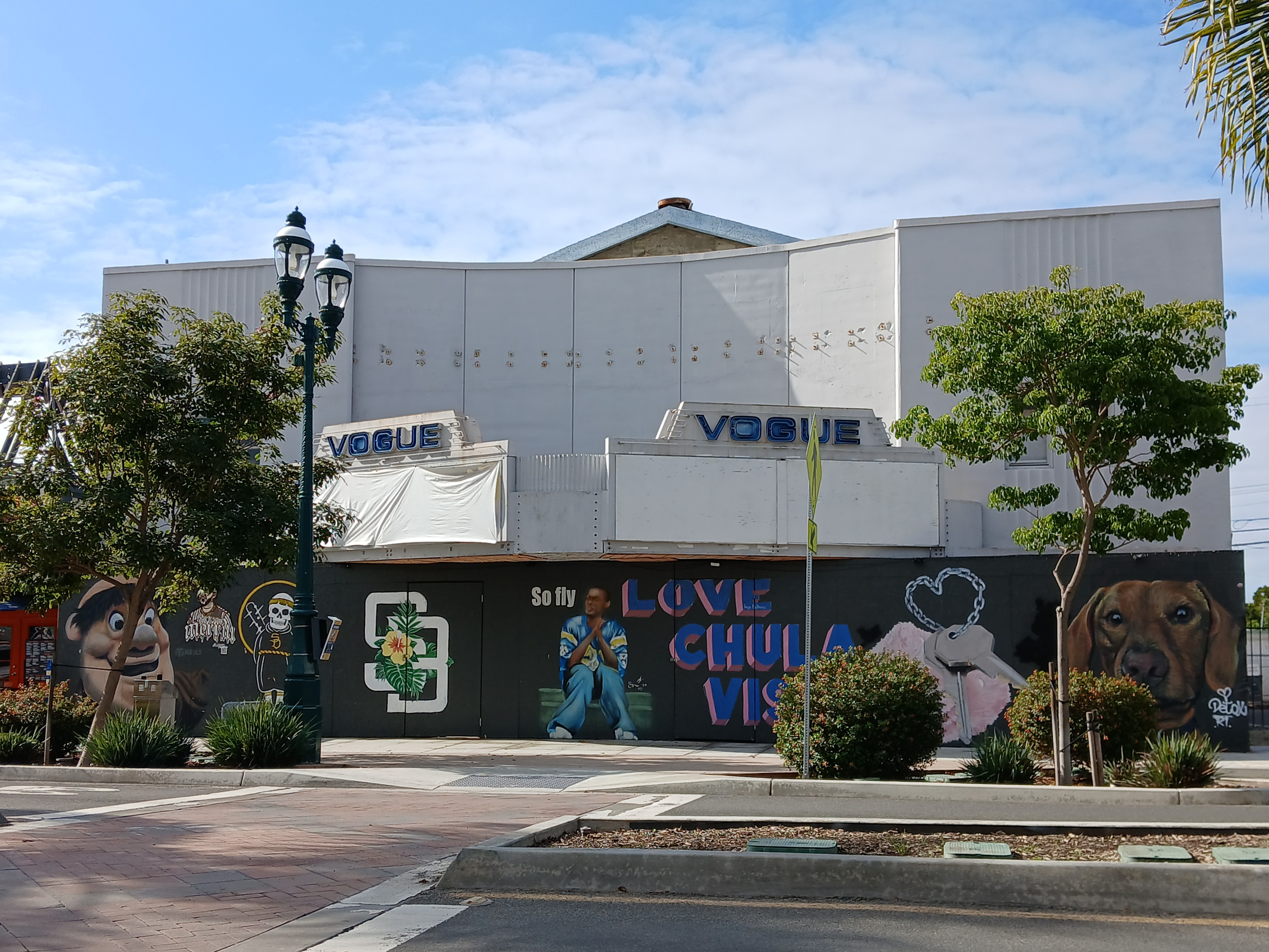
- Interactive map of The Vogue Theater
- Address: Chula Vista, California; United States
- Coordinates: 32.64373°N 117.08117°W

Construction
- Opened: January 19, 1945
- Closed: 2006
- Architect: Frank Hope Jr. / Amorphica Design Research Office

Website
- thevoguetheater.com

The Vogue Theater is a historic movie theater in downtown Chula Vista, California. It was designed by the architect Frank Hope Jr. in 1943, and opened on January 19, 1945. The theater is a poured in place concrete building and seats 825. Due to its configuration and stage, the theater has been a venue for several Chula Vista and San Diego political debates by the likes of former San Diego City mayor Roger Hedgecock and former Chula Vista mayor Cheryl Cox.

The Vogue Theater operated as a single screen theater for 600 until it closed in 2006. The Vogue Theater was named a historical resource by the City of Chula Vista in 2011. On February 20, 2014, Amorphica Design Research Office received permits from the City of Chula Vista to restore and renovate the Vogue Theater back to its original state with other uses to the building.
