= Rancho Janal =

Mexican land grant in California

Coordinates: 32.620°N 116.930°W

Rancho Janal was a 4,437-acre (17.96 km^{2}) Mexican land grant in present day San Diego County, California, given in 1829 by Governor José María de Echeandía to José Antonio Estudillo. The grant was located near present day Otay Mesa. A large portion of the grant is now covered by the waters of the Upper and Lower Otay Reservoirs. Rancho Janal and the adjoining Rancho Otay were granted to members of the Estudillo family, and they are often considered as one rancho.

== History ==
José Antonio Estudillo (1805 – 1852), the son of José María Estudillo, was born at Monterey and became prominent in political affairs. In 1825 Estudillo married María Victoria Dominguez, daughter of Sergeant Cristobal Dominguez, who was the grantee of Rancho San Pedro. The Estudillos were absentee ranchers, living in Pueblo de San Diego. He was alcalde of San Diego in 1836-1838 and was elected as the inaugural San Diego County treasurer in 1850, although he refused the office and Philip Crosthwaite was appointed to fill the office in his place.

With the cession of California to the United States following the Mexican-American War, the 1848 Treaty of Guadalupe Hidalgo provided that the land grants would be honored. As required by the Land Act of 1851, a claim for Rancho Janal was filed with the Public Land Commission in 1852, and the grant was patented to Victoria Dominguez et al. in 1872.

Elisha Spurr Babcock, Jr., who also built Hotel del Coronado, purchased Rancho Janal in 1883, and built lower Otay Dam for the Southern California Water Company in 1900. Henry G. Fenton, a subcontractor of Babcock, bought 3,000 acres (12 km^{2}) of Rancho Janal in 1926.

== See also ==
- Ranchos of San Diego County, California
