= Otay River =

River in San Diego, CA

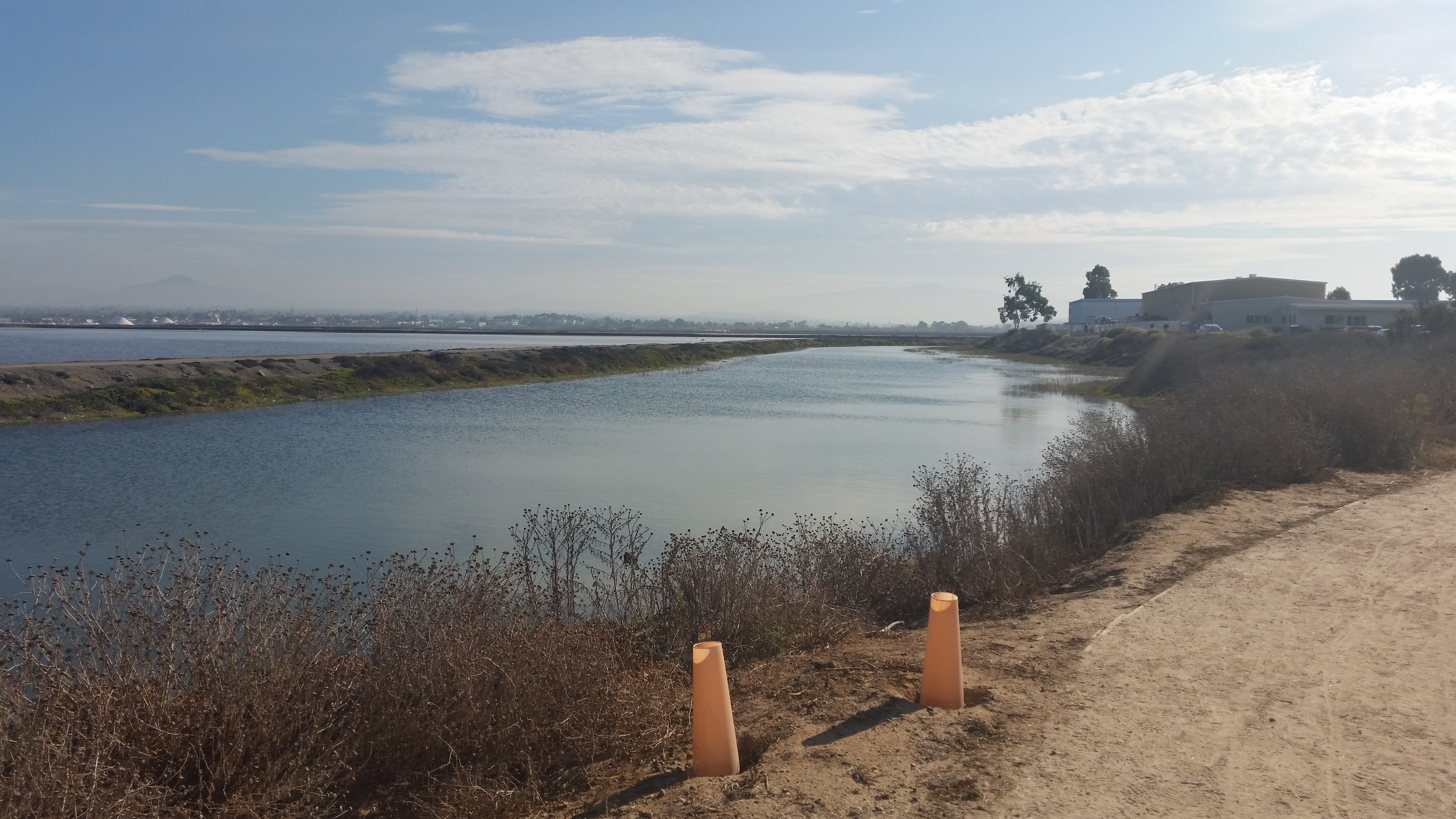
- The river as it flows at the northern extreme of Imperial Beach, California

Location
- Country: United States
- State: California
- Region: San Diego County

Physical characteristics
- Source: Outlet of Lower Otay Reservoir
  - location: Otay County Open Space Preserve
  - coordinates: 32°36′39″N 117°06′59″W
  - elevation: 392 ft (119 m)
- Mouth: San Diego Bay
  - location: Imperial Beach
  - coordinates: 32°36′23″N 116°55′29″W
  - elevation: 0 ft (0 m)
- Length: 25 mi (40 km)
- Basin size: 160 mi^{2} (410 km^{2})

Basin features
- Tributaries
  - left: Jamul Creek

The Otay River (/ˈoʊtaɪ/) is a river in southern San Diego County, California. The 25 mi (40 km) river begins at San Miguel Mountain, flows through the Upper and Lower Otay Reservoirs, and continues on between the southern part of the Chula Vista and the Otay Mesa West district of San Diego, to its river mouth on San Diego Bay.

== River ==
The river has a 160-square-mile (410 km^{2}) watershed. To its north is the watershed of Sweetwater River, and to its south is the watershed of Tijuana River. Between Interstate 5 and Interstate 805 is Otay Valley Regional Park. As of 2016, there is a plan to restore part of its pre-Mexican era estuary on lands utilized by the South Bay Salt Works.

== Otay Reservoirs ==
Savage Dam, completed in 1921, forms the 49,510 acre⋅ft (61,070,000 m^{3}) Lower Otay Reservoir, which is used to supply drinking water to parts of southern San Diego County. The reservoir is also the terminus for Pipeline 3 of the Second San Diego Aqueduct, which delivers water from the Colorado River via the Colorado River Aqueduct. Its predecessor, the Lower Otay Dam was a "rockhill type", which was completed in 1897; it failed in 1916 following heavy rains.

The Upper Otay Reservoir is formed by Upper Otay Dam, built in 1901. The reservoir was established as a hatchery for the introduction of Florida-strain largemouth bass in 1959. The reservoir was chemically treated first, which killed all of the native fish. In 1996, the reservoir was opened to fishing, but all fish caught must be released.

Since the river is used as a municipal water supply, there is no human contact allowed at either of the Otay Reservoirs.

Early testing of manned gliders by noted aviator John J. Montgomery occurred in the region in the late 19th century.
