= Rancho Otay =

Mexican land grant in California

Coordinates: 32.610°N 116.970°W

Rancho Otay was a 6,658-acre (26.94 km^{2}) Mexican land grant in present-day San Diego County, California, given in 1829 by Governor José María de Echeandía to Magdelena Estudillo. The grant in the present-day Otay Mesa area, extended along the Otay River, just west of Lower Otay Reservoir.

== History ==
The two square league grant was made to Magdalena Estudillo, whose brother, José Antonio Estudillo, was grantee of the adjoining one square league Rancho Janal. The two grants, both to members of the Estudillo family, are often considered as one rancho. The Estudillos were absentee ranchers, living in Pueblo de San Diego.

With the cession of California to the United States following the Mexican-American War, the 1848 Treaty of Guadalupe Hidalgo provided that the land grants would be honored. As required by the Land Act of 1851, a claim for Rancho Otay was filed with the Public Land Commission in 1852, and the grant was patented to Magdelena Estudillo in 1872.

A separate claim was filed by Victoria Dominguez et al, in 1852 and a Patent was issued to Victoria Dominguez in 1872 for 4,437.16 acres.

== See also ==
- Ranchos of San Diego County, California
