= Lower Otay Reservoir =

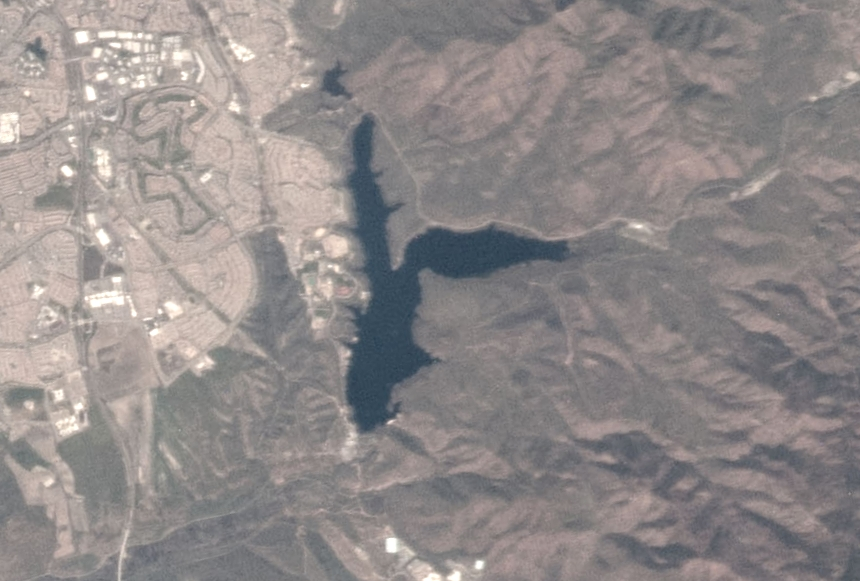

- Location within San Diego County, California Location within California Location within the United States
- Interactive map of Lower Otay Reservoir
- Location: San Diego County, California
- Coordinates: 32.6372°N 116.9249°W
- Type: Reservoir
- Part of: Otay and Proctor Valleys
- Primary inflows: Otay River; San Diego Aqueduct
- Primary outflows: Otay River
- Basin countries: United States
- Managing agency: City of San Diego
- Surface area: 1,100 acres (450 ha)
- Average depth: 124 ft (38 m) (August 2009)
- Max. depth: 137.5 ft (41.9 m)
- Water volume: 49,500 acre⋅ft (61.1×10^{6} m^{3})
- Shore length^{1}: 25 mi (40 km)
- Surface elevation: 381 ft (116 m)
- Website: www.sandiego.gov/reservoirs-lakes/lower-otay-reservoir
- References: U.S. Geological Survey Geographic Names Information System: Lower Otay Reservoir
- ^{1} Shore length is not a well-defined measure.

Lower Otay Reservoir is a reservoir in San Diego County, California. It is flanked by Otay Mountain to the southeast, the Jamul Mountains to the east, Otay Lakes Road and Upper Otay Reservoir to the north, and the city of Chula Vista to the west.

The reservoir is formed by impounding the waters of the Otay River, behind Savage Dam, completed in 1918, and is also the terminus for the second San Diego Aqueduct, which transports imported water from the Colorado River. The dam and reservoir are owned by the City of San Diego.

== History ==
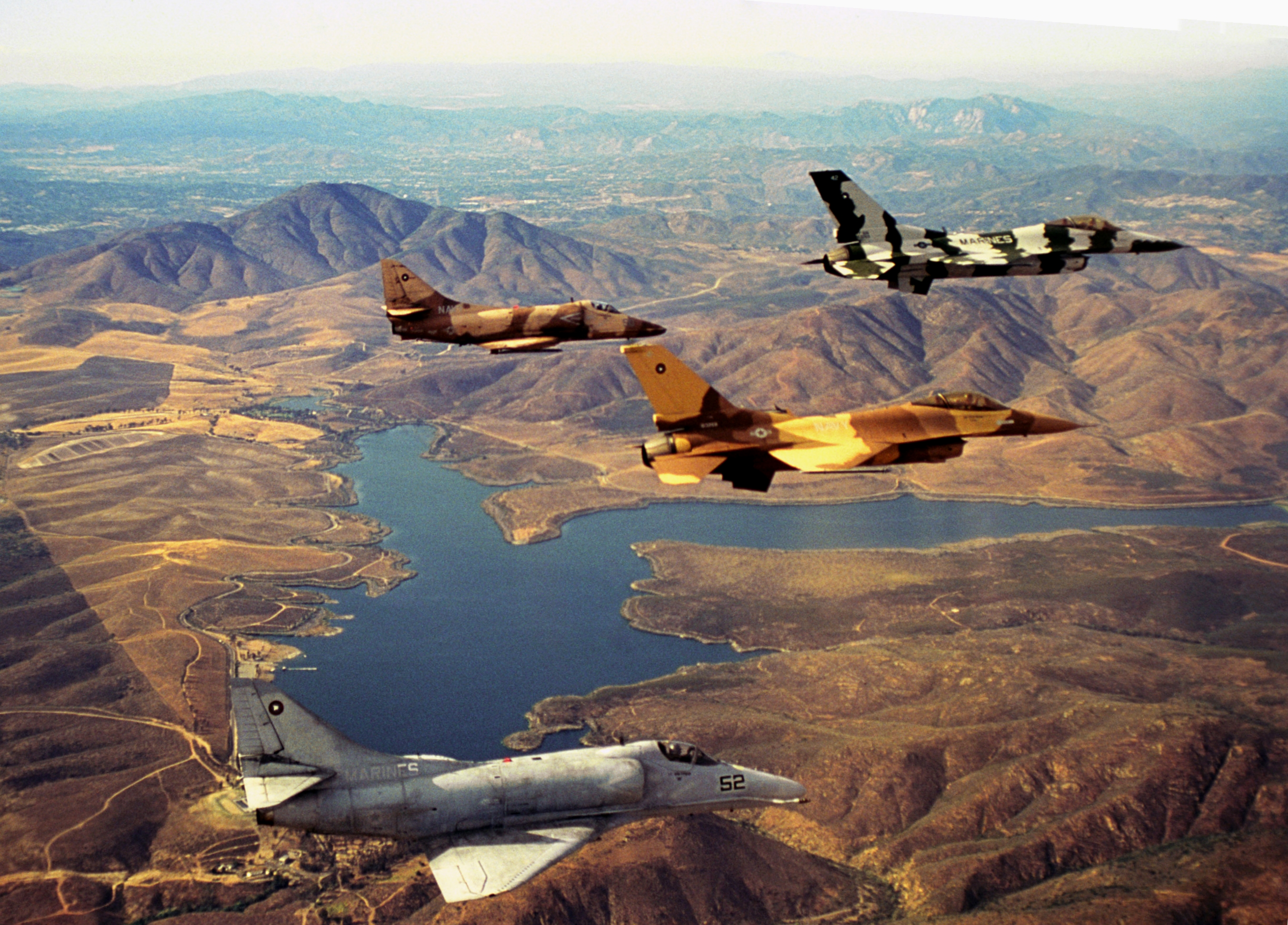
TOPGUN F-16 and A-4 aircraft in formation over Lower Otay Lake prior to development.

The area where the Reservoir is located was part of Rancho Janal, and was purchased by E. S. Babcock. Lower Otay Reservoir was originally created in 1897 after the construction of Lower Otay Dam by the Southern California Mountain Water Company. The original dam was a rock fill type of 125 feet (38 m) high. In 1900, John D. Spreckels purchased the land around the reservoir, and the reservoir was later acquired by a company owned by Spreckels. At the lake was a hunting lodge that was utilized by guests of Hotel del Coronado.

The original dam gave way in January 1916 following heavy rains which affected most of Southern California flooding the Otay Valley with a wall of water ranging from 20 to 100 feet (6.1 to 30.5 m) in height during the event, killing more than 14 people. The flood swept away entire farms and buildings, including the Montgomery residence at Fruitland near the mouth of the river, where John J. Montgomery had built his initial series of manned glider designs. The rains were ostensibly the work of the "rainmaker" Charles Hatfield, who had been hired by the City of San Diego to assist in increasing rainfall to fill nearby Morena Reservoir. He was never charged with any crimes. Following this the present Arch-gravity dam was built.In 1934, the dam was named in honor of Hiram Newton Savage, the city engineer who supervised its construction..

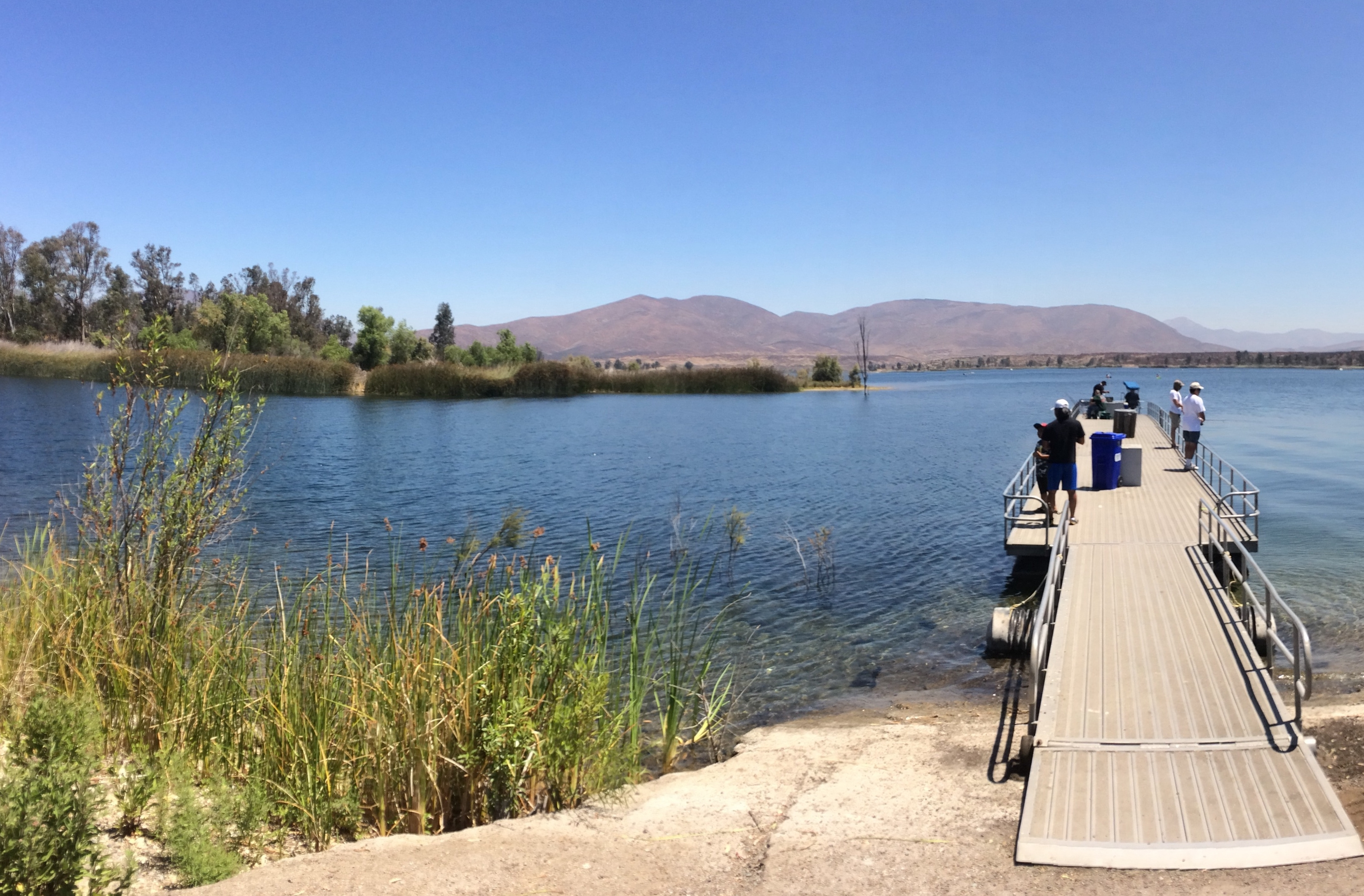
A pier on the Lower Otay Reservoir

In 1936, Stephen Birch purchased the land around the reservoir, which had been Rancho Otay. His daughter Mary inherited the land and, marrying a former Royal Air Force commander, moved into the former hunting lodge on Upper Otay Lake, Rancho del Otay.

In February 2009, a bass fisherman spotted a Curtiss SB2C Helldiver plane in the lake. On May 28, 1945, it had been on a practice bombing run from a nearby aircraft carrier when a stalled engine forced an emergency landing in the reservoir. Divers examined the plane on July 23, 2009, to see if it could be salvaged for museum display, and it was raised on August 20, 2010.

== See also ==
- List of dams and reservoirs in California
- List of lakes in California
