= Sharp Chula Vista Medical Center =

Geography
- Location: Chula Vista, California, United States

Organization
- Type: General hospital

Helipads
- Helipad: FAA LID: CL09

Links
- Website: Official website
- Lists: Hospitals in the United States

Sharp Chula Vista Medical Center is a hospital in Chula Vista, California, United States.
