= Gaylord Palms Resort & Convention Center =

Hotel and convention center in Kissimmee, Florida

Coordinates: 28°20′34″N 81°31′33″W

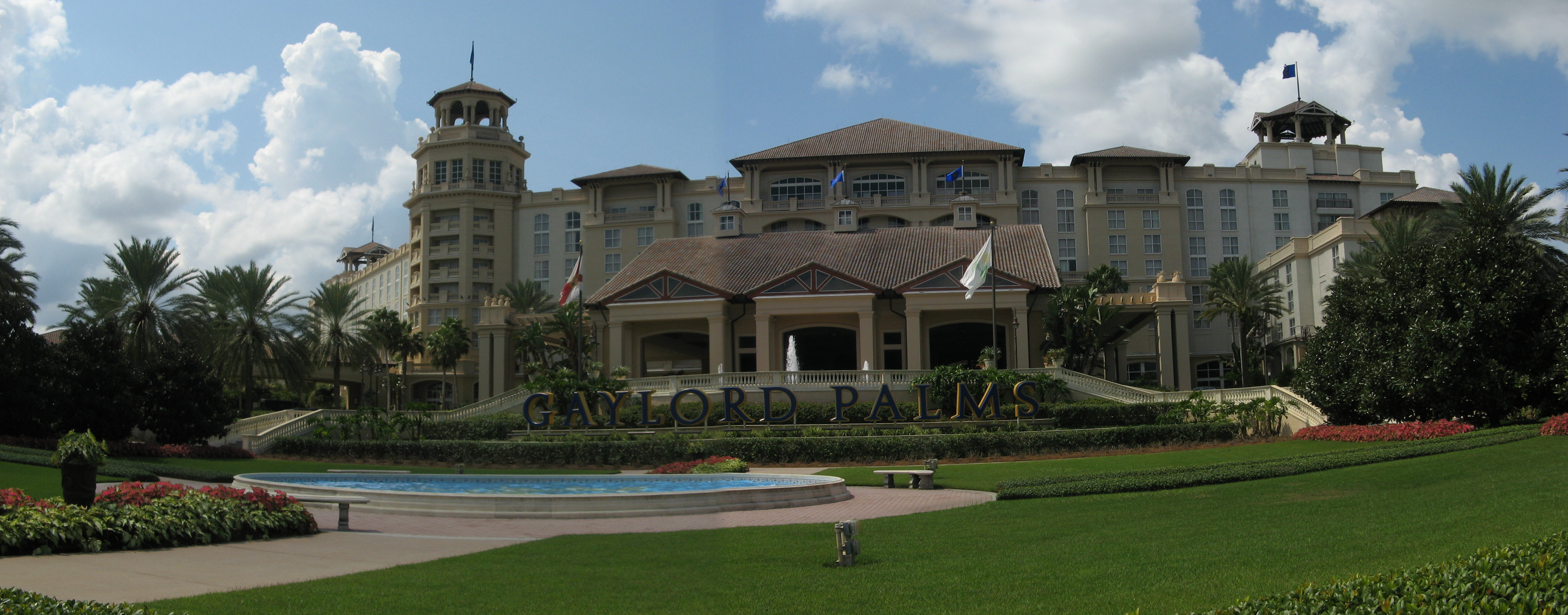
- Gaylord Palms, as viewed from the front
- Interactive map of the Gaylord Palms Resort & Convention Center area

General information
- Location: 6000 West Osceola Parkway; Kissimmee, Florida
- Opening: February 2, 2002
- Renovated: 2025
- Owner: Ryman Hospitality Properties
- Operator: Marriott International

Technical details
- Floor count: 9

Design and construction
- Architects: Hnedak Bobo Group, Inc.

Other information
- Number of rooms: 1,718
- Number of suites: 129
- Number of restaurants: 4
- Parking: Self Parking, Valet

Website
- Gaylord Palms

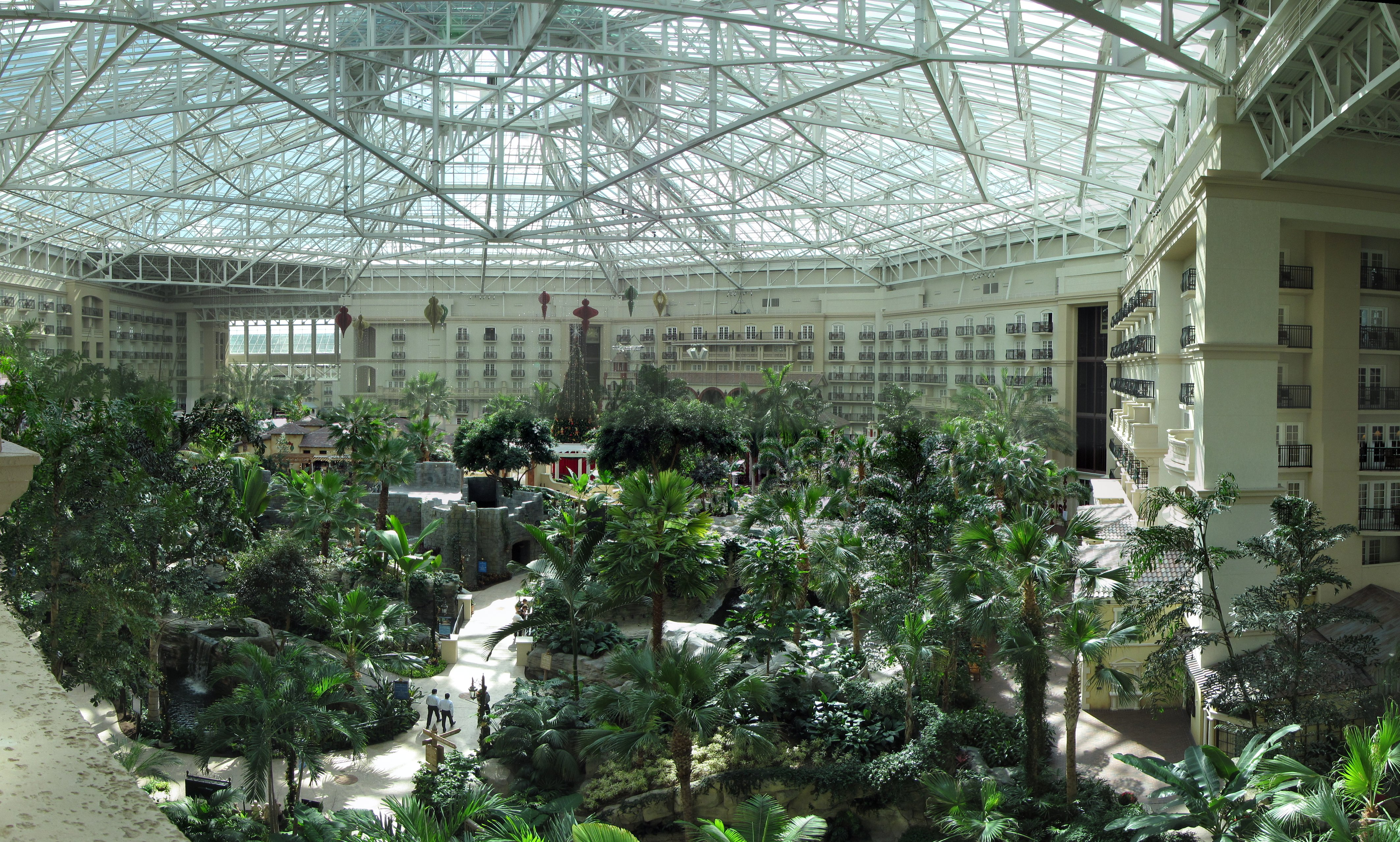
Atrium

Gaylord Palms Resort & Convention Center is a hotel and convention center, opened in Kissimmee, Florida, on February 2, 2002. It also acts as the de facto convention center for Osceola County, Florida. It offers 500,000 sq ft (46,000 m^{2}) of meeting space, and 1,718 guest rooms and suites.

== Ownership ==
Gaylord Palms is owned by Ryman Hospitality Properties (formerly Gaylord Entertainment Company) and operated by Marriott International. It is a sister hotel to the Gaylord Opryland Resort & Convention Center, Gaylord Texan Resort & Convention Center, Gaylord National Resort & Convention Center, Gaylord Rockies Resort & Convention Center, and Gaylord Pacific Resort & Convention Center.

== History ==
Gaylord Palms was originally to be named Opryland Hotel Florida. When Gaylord Entertainment decided to re-brand their Opryland Hotels division to Gaylord Hotels on October 26, 2001, the name Gaylord Palms was given to the Florida hotel.

Gaylord Palms offer Christmas programming with large-scale events like Best of Florida Christmas and ICE!, an attraction hand-carved from two million pounds of ice inside an attraction that is kept at 9 degrees Fahrenheit.

In 2021, Gaylord Palms opened its largest expansion, a $158-million project that added 100,000 square feet of convention space and more than 300 guest rooms and suites. Its Cypress Springs Water Park was expanded with the addition of an "action river" attraction.

In 2025, the hotel unveiled a $134-million renovation project that redesign of the main lobby and 1,418 guest rooms and suites, a complete renovation of two dining options, Old Hickory Steakhouse, the hotel’s signature steakhouse, and Socio, the main lobby’s bar, and a refresh of 77,000 square feet of meeting space.

Gaylord Palms is a member of the Great Hotels Of The World alliance.

== Hotel design ==
Gaylord Palms is built around a 4.6-acre (19,000 m^{2}) glass-covered atrium, divided into four areas, each with activities and guest rooms. The atrium has more than 500,000 plants, as well as Florida fish and wildlife.

- St. Augustine has an old-world colonial Spanish theme based on North America's oldest existing permanent settlement. Among its features are a wedding gazebo, a replica of the Castillo de San Marcos (North America's oldest fort), an alligator exhibit, and a display with treasures from the Spanish galleon Our Lady of Atocha, sunk off the Florida coast in 1622.
- Key West is inspired by Mallory Square, the central area of the major Florida Keys port city. It has a 65-foot (20 m)-long sailboat, which is designed around a seafood restaurant called MOOR.
- The Everglades is themed on Florida's river of grass. It hosts Old Hickory Steakhouse snd a spa.
- Emerald Bay has 15,344 sq ft (1,425.5 m^{2}) of meeting space and 26 luxury suites. Shops and boutiques can be found on the ground floor of this locale.
- Gulf Coast has 300 guest rooms including twelve suites and one presidential suite.

== Convention Center ==
The Gaylord Palms Convention Center has 500,000 sq ft (46,000 m^{2}) of meeting space. More than half of that space is the Florida Exhibition Hall, one large bay, which has 210,300 sq ft (19,540 m^{2}) including prefunction space. It features a permanent 101- by 40 ft (12 m). performing stage with green rooms and dressing rooms connected to its Osceola Ballroom.
