= Chula Vista, California =

City in California, United States

- City
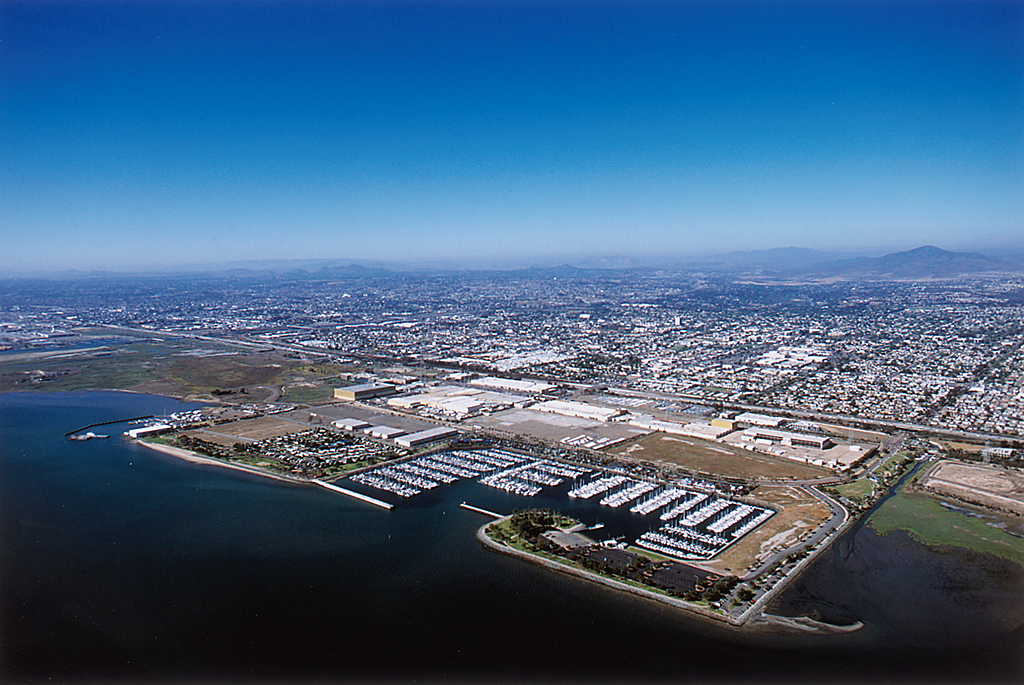
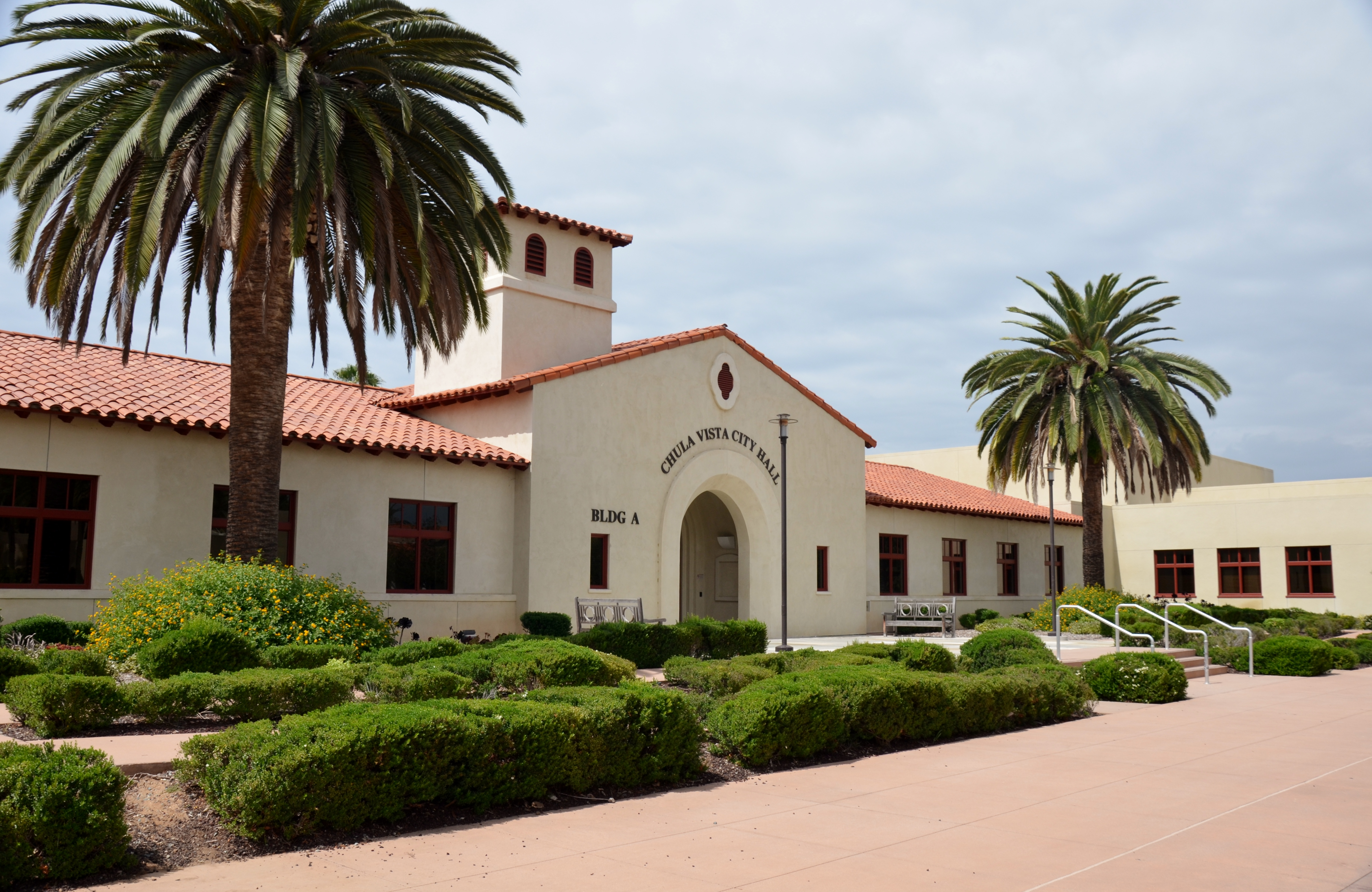
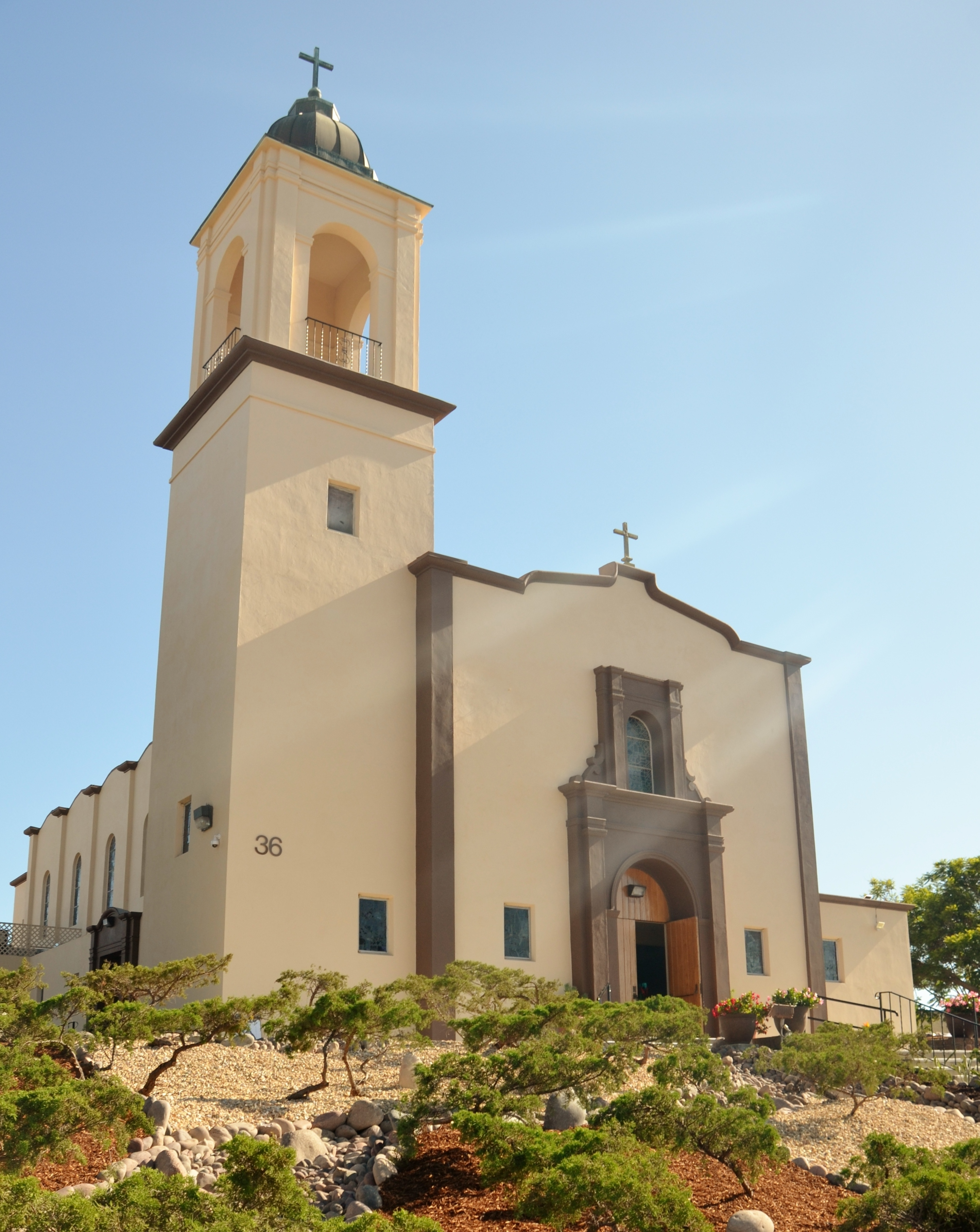
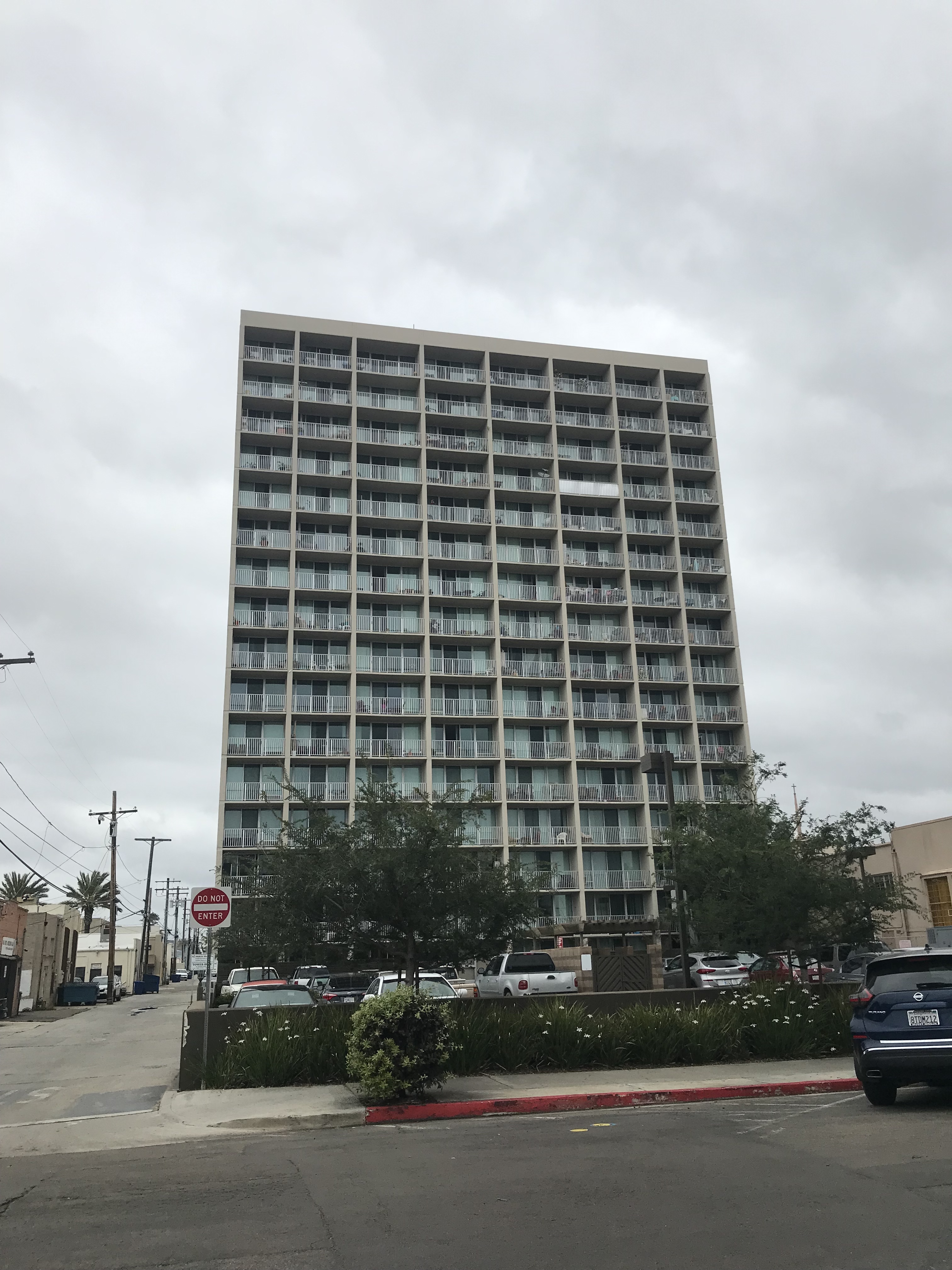
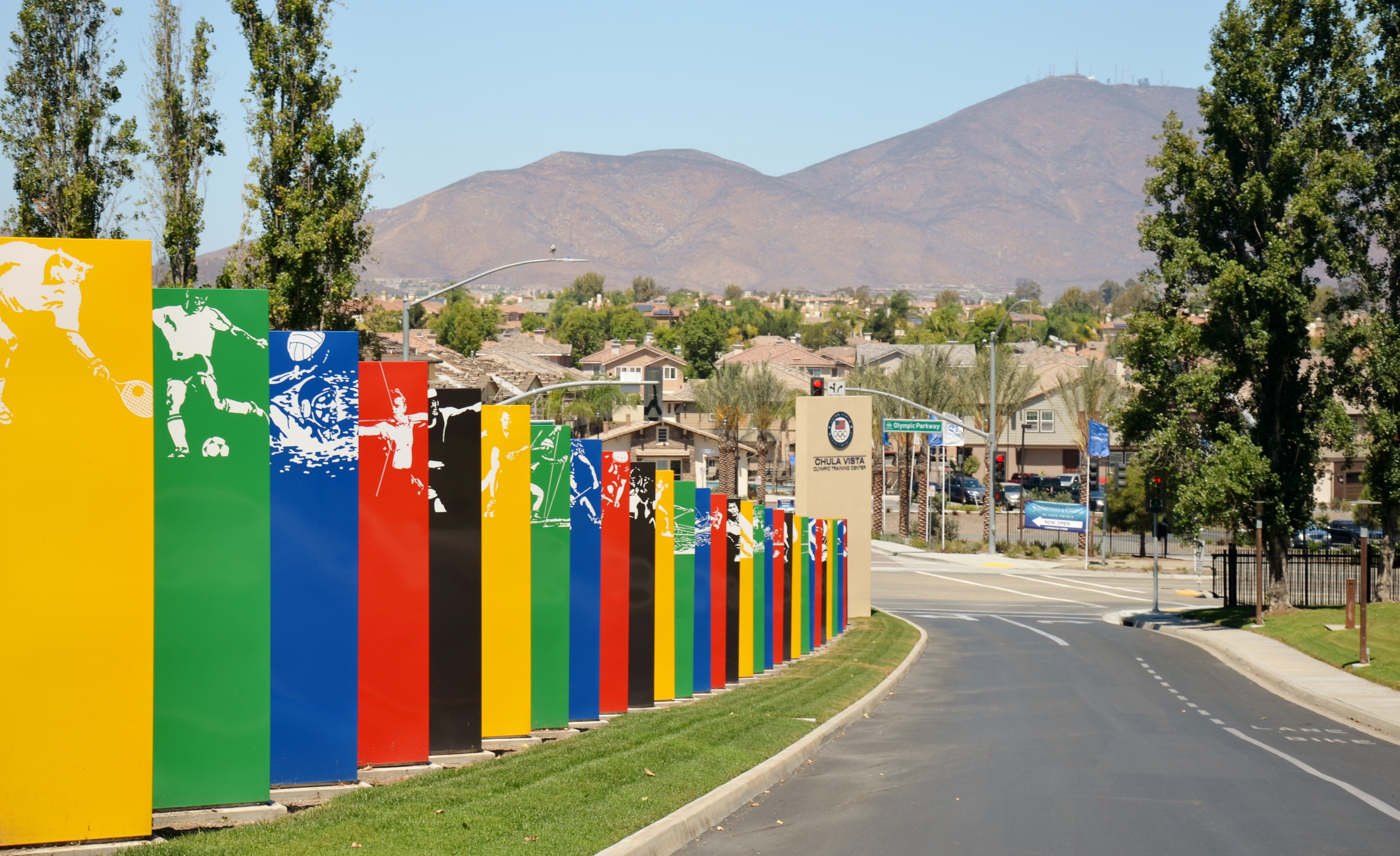
- From top to bottom, left to right: Chula Vista Bayfront, Chula Vista City Hall, Saint Pius X Catholic Church, Congregational Tower, Chula Vista Elite Athletic Training Center

- Flag Seal
- Nicknames: Lemon Capital of the World
- Interactive map of Chula Vista, California
- Location within San Diego County Location within California Location within the United States
- Coordinates: 32°37′40″N 117°2′53″W
- Country: United States
- State: California
- County: San Diego
- Incorporated: November 28, 1911
- Named for: Spanish for "pretty view"

Government
  - Type: Council–manager
  - Mayor: John McCann
  - City manager: Maria V. Kachadoorian

Area
  - City: 52.09 sq mi (134.92 km^{2})
  - Land: 49.64 sq mi (128.56 km^{2})
  - Water: 2.46 sq mi (6.36 km^{2}) 4.73%
- Elevation: 66 ft (20 m)

Population (2020)
  - City: 275,487
  - Estimate (2025): 275,533 ▲
  - Rank: 2nd in San Diego County; 15th in California; 81st in the United States
  - Density: 5,550.0/sq mi (2,142.87/km^{2})
  - Metro: San Diego–Tijuana: 5,105,768
- Time zone: UTC−8 (PST)
  - Summer (DST): UTC−7 (PDT)
- ZIP codes: 91909–91915, 91921
- Area code: 619
- FIPS code: 06-13392
- GNIS feature IDs: 1660481, 2409461
- Website: www.chulavistaca.gov

Chula Vista (/ˌtʃuːlə ˈvɪstə/ CHOO-lə VIST-ə; Spanish for 'Beautiful (or Pretty) View', Spanish pronunciation: [ˈtʃula ˈβista]) is a city in San Diego County, California, United States. It is the second-most populous city in the San Diego metropolitan area, the seventh-most populous city in Southern California, the 15th-most populous city in the state of California, and the 81st-most populous city in the United States. The population was 275,487 as of the 2020 census, up from 243,916 as of the 2010 census. It is located in the South Bay, about halfway—7.5 miles (12.1 km)—between the two downtowns of the San Diego–Tijuana region. Chula Vista is named for its scenic location between San Diego Bay and coastal mountain foothills.

The area, along with San Diego, was inhabited by the Kumeyaay before contact from the Spanish, who later claimed the area. In 1821, Chula Vista became part of the newly declared Mexican Empire, which reformed as the First Mexican Republic two years later. California became part of the United States in 1848 as a result of the Mexican–American War, and was admitted to the union as a state in 1850.

Founded in the early 19th century and incorporated in October 1911, fast population growth has recently been observed in the city. The city is home to the Chula Vista Elite Athlete Training Center, Sesame Place San Diego, North Island Credit Union Amphitheatre, Chula Vista Marina, and the Living Coast Discovery Center.

== History ==
=== Early history ===
Fossils of aquatic life, in the form of a belemnitida from the Jurassic, have been found within the modern borders of Chula Vista. During the Oligocene epoch, land life fossils were found. In addition, fossils from the Eocene epoch were discovered in nearby Bonita. It is not until 10,000 years ago that human activity has been found within the modern borders of Chula Vista, primarily in Otay Valley of the San Dieguito people. The oldest site of human settlement within the modern boundaries of Chula Vista, was named Otai by the Spanish in 1769, and had been occupied as far back as 7,980 years ago. Another place where humans first settled within the modern boundaries of Chula Vista was at the Rolling Hills Site, which dates back to 7,000 years ago.

In 3000 BC, people speaking the Yuman (Quechan) language began moving into the region from the Lower Colorado River Valley and southwestern Arizona portions of the Sonoran Desert. Later the Kumeyaay tribe came to populate the land, on which the city sits today, and lived in the area for hundreds of years. The Kumeyaay built a village known as Chiap (or Chyap) which was located by mudflats at the southern end of South Bay.

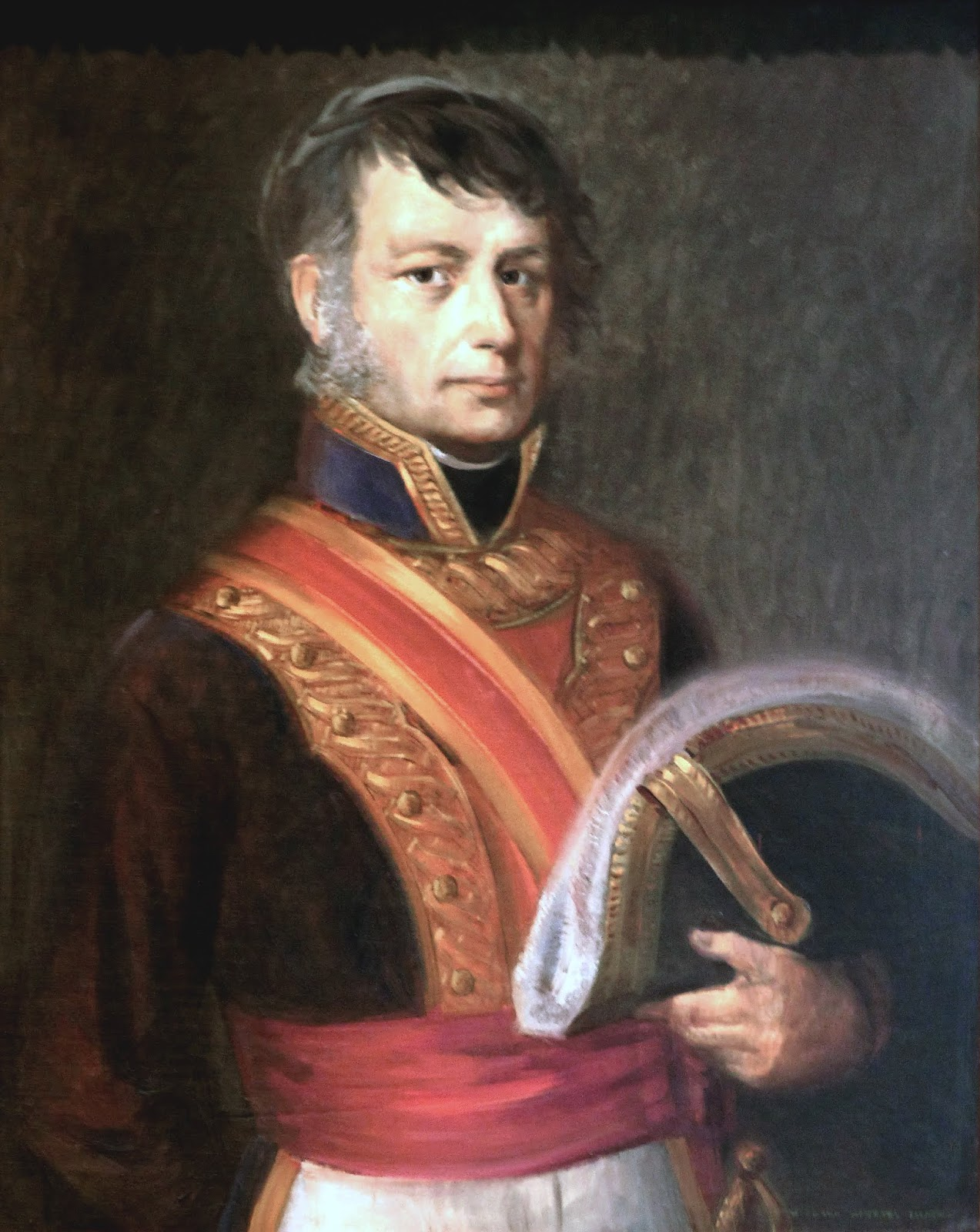
José María Estudillo and the Estudillo family, a powerful Californio clan of Southern California, owned the majority of modern-day Chula Vista.

In 1542 AD, a fleet of three Spanish Empire ships commanded by Juan Rodríguez Cabrillo, sailed into San Diego Harbor. Early explorations by Spanish conquistadors, such as these, led to Spanish claims of the land. The village of Chiap (known to the Spanish as La Punta) became a center of a Kumeyaay revolt against the Spanish in 1775, which was later abandoned by 1776. The historic land on which Chula Vista sits became part of the 1795 land grant known as Rancho del Rey or The King's Ranch. The land eventually was renamed Rancho de la Nación.

After Mexico became independent from Spain, what is now Chula Vista became part of Alta California. Beginning in 1829, the land that is now Chula Vista was divided among Rancho Janal, Rancho Otay, Rancho de la Nación and Rancho La Punta; these were owned by José María Estudillo, José's sister Maria, John (Don Juan) Forster, and Santiago E. Argüello respectively.

During the Mexican–American War, California was claimed by the United States, regardless of the California independence movement that had briefly swept the state. Though California was now under the jurisdiction of the United States, land grants were allowed to continue in the form of private property. In 1873, the United States Army built a telegraph line between San Diego and Fort Yuma which ran through Telegraph Canyon in Chula Vista; its construction was under the command of Captain George F. Price of the 5th Cavalry Regiment out of Camp McDowell. In the 1870s and 1880s mining was done on Rancho Janal.

The San Diego Land and Town Company developed lands of the Rancho de la Nación for new settlement. The town began as a five thousand acre development, with the first house being erected in 1887; by 1889, ten houses had been completed. Around this time, the lemon was introduced to the city, by a retired professor from the University of Wisconsin. Chula Vista can be roughly translated from Spanish as "beautiful view"; the name was suggested by Sweetwater Dam designer James D. Schulyer.

The 1888 completion of the dam allowed for irrigation of Chula Vista farming lands. Chula Vista eventually became the largest lemon-growing center in the world for a period of time. As of February 2019, the oldest surviving buildings in Chula Vista originate from around this time, including the Barber house, and the Cordrey house. In 1889, the city became home to the first watch factory west of the Mississippi River. Additionally, the Coronado Belt Line Railroad was built through Chula Vista, connecting Hotel Del Coronado with National City, where Southern California Railroad terminated. Another railroad built through Chula Vista was the National City and Otay Railroad, which was routed down Third Avenue. During the depression at the end of the century, industrial employment in Chula Vista was limited to the La Punta Salt Works and packing houses.

=== 20th century ===
In 1911, Chula Vista had 15,000 acres (61 km^{2}) of agricultural lands, of which 4,000 acres (16 km^{2}) were lemon groves. The citizens of Chula Vista voted to incorporate on October 17, 1911. The State approved the city's incorporation in November. One of its first city council members was a former Clevelandite Greg Rogers, who was also a leader of the Chula Vista Yacht Club. The yacht club would the first on the West Coast to build race specific boats, which resulted in a uniquely designed sloop. In 1915, a Carnegie Library was built on F Street. In the 1910s, Chinese, Filipino, and Mexican farm laborers worked the fields within the city, with most commuting in from downtown San Diego and Logan Heights.

In January 1916, Chula Vista was impacted by the Hatfield Flood, which was named after Charles Hatfield, when the Lower Otay Dam collapsed flooding the valley surrounding the Otay River; up to fifty people died in the flood. Later in 1916, the Hercules Powder Company opened a 30-acre bayfront site, now known as Gunpowder point, which produced substances used to make cordite, a gun propellant used extensively by the British Armed Forces during World War I. In 1920, San Diego Country Club opened in Chula Vista, with its clubhouse designed by Richard Requa who had previously worked on the California Pacific International Exposition. In 1925, aviation began in Chula Vista, with the Tyce School of Aviation, operating the Chula Vista Airport. In 1926, the salt works purchased Rancho Janal and grew barley and lima beans.

Although the Great Depression affected Chula Vista significantly, agriculture still provided considerable income for the residents. In 1931, the lemon orchards produced $1 million in revenue and the celery fields contributed $600,000. Japanese American farms played a significant role in developing new crops outside of lemons, especially celery. In the 1930s, led by Chris Mensalvas, Filipino and Mexican farm workers went on strike against the celery farms. To the east, on land formerly known as Rancho Janal, dairy farming and cattle farming was done on over 4,000 acres (1,600 ha). By the end of the 1930s, the city's population of over 4,000 residents was mostly Caucasian, with small populations of Japanese and Mexican Americans. Prior to World War II, anti-Japanese sentiment had existed in Chula Vista, due to competition between Japanese farmers and White farmers, however an association was formed which decreased those sentiments.

In November 1940, the city purchased the Chula Vista Airport for Rohr Aircraft. The relocation of Rohr Aircraft Corporation to Chula Vista in early 1941, just months before the attack on Pearl Harbor, changed Chula Vista. The land never returned to being orchard groves again. At the Rohr factory, the 11,000 employees worked on power units for the Consolidated B-24 Liberator. In 1945, The Vogue Theater opened.

Due to Executive Order 9066, the Japanese Americans who lived in Chula Vista were sent to Santa Anita Racetrack and then to the Poston War Relocation Center. One of those Japanese Americans from Chula Vista was Joseph K. Sano, who was an air corps veteran of World War I, and a member of the American Legion; during World War II, Sano served in the Military Intelligence Service Language School at the University of Michigan. In 1944, the state of California attempted to seize land in Chula Vista owned by Kajiro Oyama, a legal Japanese resident who was then interned in Utah. Oyama was correctly charged with putting the property in his son Fred's name with the intent to evade the Alien Land Law because Fred was a native-born citizen. The case went to the U.S. Supreme Court as Oyama v. California, where the court found that Kajiro's equal protection rights had been violated.

The population of post–World War II Chula Vista tripled from 5,000 residents in 1940 to more than 16,000 in 1950. After the war, many of the factory workers and thousands of servicemen stayed in the area, resulting in the huge growth in population. The last of the citrus groves and produce fields disappeared as Chula Vista became one of the largest communities in San Diego County. In 1949, the city limits of Chula Vista expanded for the first time. Due to the construction of the Montgomery Freeway, the Arguello Adobe of Rancho La Punta was demolished. In 1955, the Big Ski Drive-In opened; until it closed in 1980, it was one of the largest drive-in theaters in the nation. By the 1960s, Chula Vista continued its expansion with the annexation of part of Bonita. That same decade, Filipinos and Mexicans began to move into Chula Vista in significant numbers; these included Filipino navy veterans. In 1963, Chula Vista became the 2nd-most populous city in San Diego County. From 1960 to 2013, the South Bay Power Plant, a 700-megawatt, four-boiler plant, occupied 115 acres (47 ha) of the Chula Vista waterfront.

In 1971, a McDonald's on Third Avenue, became the first to have a PlayPlace location, and was 7,000 square feet (650 m^{2}). The original PlayPlace was replaced and a newer version was installed, remaining there until at least 2015. Before 2024, the PlayPlace was uninstalled.

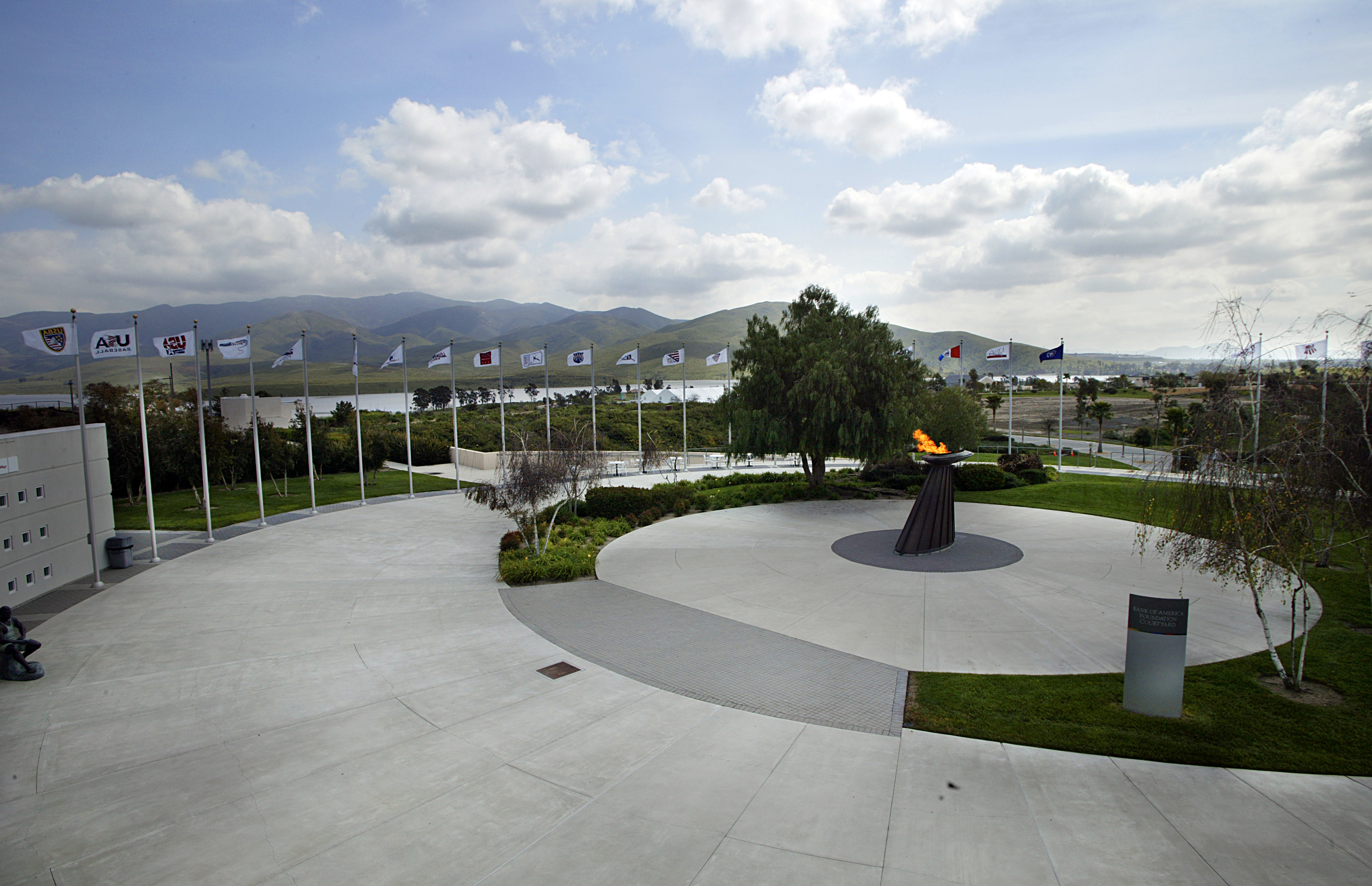
Olympic Training Center, with Lower Otay Reservoir in the background

In 1985, Chula Vista made the largest annexation in California history, which included the neighborhoods of Castle Park and Otay. In January 1986, Chula Vista annexed the unincorporated community of Montgomery, which had previously rejected annexation in 1979 and 1982. At the time of the annexation the community was virtually surrounded by its larger neighbor. Later, San Diego gave way, allowing Chula Vista to annex the Otay River Valley, which was opposed by residents in Otay Mesa and Nestor. Over the next few decades, Chula Vista continued to expand eastward. Plans called for a variety of housing developments such as the Eastlake, Rancho del Rey, and Otay Ranch neighborhoods. During this expansion a walrus fossil was found, of an extinct species of toothless Valenictus, after the species was named for the city. The quick expansion east of Interstate 805 was not embraced by all of the cities residents, leading to advocacy that new housing developments be built with parks, schools, and emergency services. In 1991, Chula Vista elected its first female mayor, Gayle McCandliss, who died from cancer a few weeks after being elected. In 1995, the United States Olympic Committee opened an Olympic Training Center in Eastlake on donated land; it is the USOC's first master-planned facility and is adjacent to Lower Otay Reservoir. In the last decade of the century, a desalinization plant opened to process water from wells along the Sweetwater River; it was expanded less than two decades later, which included a pumping station built in Bonita.

==== Camp Otay/Weber ====
During World War I and II, the army maintained a base on the present-day corner of Main Street and Albany Avenue. It initially served as a border post during World War I, and was reestablished in December 1942. It was home to the 140th Infantry Regiment, 35th Infantry Division. The regiment conducted war games against the Camp Lockett–based 10th Cavalry, and were defeated. The base was closed in February 1944, and the division went on to see combat in the European theater. All traces of the post have since been removed.

=== 21st century ===
In 2003, Chula Vista had 200,000 residents and was the second-largest city in San Diego County. That year, Chula Vista was the seventh fastest growing city in the nation, growing at a rate of 5.5%, due to the communities of Eastlake and Otay Ranch. Chula Vista is growing at a fast pace, with major developments taking place in the Otay Valley near the U.S. Olympic Training Center and Otay Lake Reservoir. Thousands of new homes have been built in the Otay Ranch, Lomas Verdes, Rancho Del Rey, Eastlake and Otay Mesa areas. In mid-2006, officials from Chula Vista and the San Diego Chargers met to discuss the potential construction of a new stadium that would serve as the home for the team; however, in June 2009, the Chargers removed Chula Vista as a possible location for a new stadium. The South Bay Expressway, a toll-road extension of State Route 125, opened on November 19, 2007.

As a result of the Mexican drug war, many Mexicans from Tijuana began to immigrate to Chula Vista. Being in close proximity to Tijuana, however, has led to some drug war activity within Chula Vista.

In 2014, a survey conducted at the request of the city found that the majority of San Diegans surveyed had a negative perception of the city. By 2015, there were over 31,000 Filipino Americans living in Chula Vista; they make up the majority of the 48,840 Asian Americans who live in Chula Vista. In 2017, Chula Vista purchased the Olympic Training Center and renamed it to Elite Athlete Training Center; the United States Olympic Committee plans to continue to use the facility and pay rent to the city. That same year, a post office in the Eastlake neighborhood was renamed Jonathan "J.D." De Guzman Post Office Building, in honor of a city resident who died while a San Diego Police Department officer in 2016; having immigrated from the Philippines in 2000, De Guzman was active in his community in Chula Vista, and went on to serve as a police officer for 16 years until his death. (Note: The individual who shot De Guzman was found guilty of De Guzman's murder. He was sentenced to death. Governor Gavin Newsom commuted the individual, changing the sentence to life without parole.) In 2017, among the several dozens of streets named for military veterans, seven streets in the Otay Ranch neighborhood were named for Chula Vista servicemembers who died in either Afghanistan or Iraq. In 2025, it was announced that a new park in the Otay Ranch neighborhood will be dedicated as Filipino American Veterans Park, and will have a privately funded monument.

The number of reported calls to the Chula Vista Police about issues regarding homeless individuals have increased from 2004 to 2014, with Chula Vista having the largest population of homeless individuals in the South Bay. In 2016, it was estimated that there were about 500 homeless individuals in Chula Vista. Due to the increase in homeless population, Chula Vista, and other neighboring cities began to pass ordinances on recreational vehicles, and other large vehicles, resulting in a drop of the number of homeless individuals within the city. By 2018, the number of homeless individuals in Chula Vista was down to 367.

In 2018, a proposal was made to develop Rohr Park into something similar to Griffith Park in Los Angeles. A development plan is to develop the bayfront.

In 2019, Chula Vista was the first city in California to be certified as a sanctuary city by the national non-profit "Welcoming America." In December 2022, the "Welcoming City" designation was revoked due to concerns about its surveillance program. The Chula Vista Police Department was sharing license plate reader data with ICE and CBP.

== Geography ==
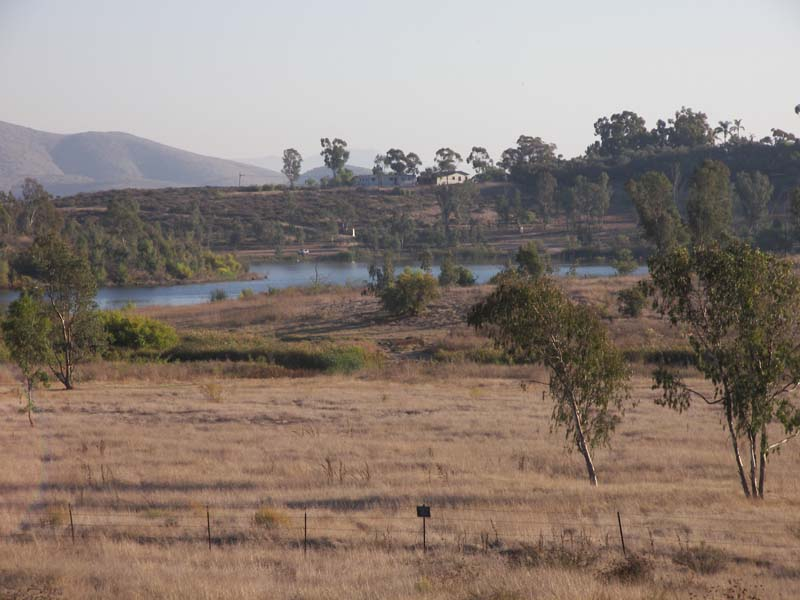
Proctor Valley in Chula Vista

As its Spanish name origins indicate—beautiful view—Chula Vista is located in the South Bay region of San Diego County, between the foothills of the Jamul and San Ysidro Mountains (including Lower Otay Reservoir) and San Diego Bay on its east and west extremes, and the Sweetwater River and Otay River at its north and south extremes. The geography of Chula Vista is impacted by the La Nacion and Rose Canyon Fault zones; it has moved rocks from Pleistocene and younger eras. Yet, as late as 13,000 years ago, soils in the Rancho del Rey area have been unaffected by fault activity.

Chula Vista is the second largest city, by area, within San Diego County. According to the United States Census Bureau, the city covers an area of 52.1 square miles (135 km^{2}), 49.6 square miles (128 km^{2}) of it land, and 2.5 square miles (6.5 km^{2}) or 4.73% of it water.

=== Ecological preserves ===
Chula Vista has within its city limits the Sweetwater Marsh unit of the San Diego Bay NWR. It also maintains several city maintained open space areas.

=== Neighborhoods ===
==== West Chula Vista ====
The original Chula Vista encompasses the area west of Hilltop Drive and north of L Street. The community of Montgomery was annexed by the city, after several failed attempts, in 1986; The community consists of most of the area south of L Street, west of Hilltop Drive and north of San Diego's city limit. Unlike East Chula Vista, West Chula Vista does not have Mello-Roos, which has been suggested to have led to those not living in West Chula Vista to develop a separate civic identity.

==== East Chula Vista ====
Beginning in the late 1980s the planned communities of Eastlake, Otay Ranch, Millenia, and Rancho del Rey began to develop in the annexed areas east of Interstate 805 and California State Route 125. These communities expanded upon the eastern annexations of the 1970s, including the area around Southwestern College. In 1986, Eastlake began to be built. In 1989, Rancho del Rey was established. In 1999, Otay Ranch began to be built on 23,000 acres (93 km^{2}).

Although "Eastlake" properly refers only to one planned community in east Chula Vista built around an artificial pond, the name is often used to encompass a much broader suburban region along the SR 125 corridor. This is due to the larger 3,151 acres (12.75 km^{2}) Eastlake development project being from Long Canyon to the West, Proctor Valley Road to the North, Upper Otay Lake and Lower Otay Lake to the East, and Salt Creek to its south. Many businesses and institutions throughout east Chula Vista use "Eastlake" in their names.

In the years around 2008 thousands of Tijuana's elite bought houses in and moved to east Chula Vista escaping violence, kidnapping and other crime taking place during that period in the Mexican metropolis only a few miles away. The Los Angeles Times wrote, "So many upper-class Mexican families live in… Eastlake… and Bonita… that… the area is becoming a gilded colony of Mexicans, where speaking English is optional and people can breathe easy cruising around in their Mercedes-Benzes and BMWs." In late 2018, a new Rapid bus route was created, taking passengers from the Otay Mesa Port of Entry, through eastern Chula Vista, and then into downtown San Diego.

=== Climate ===
Like the rest of lowland San Diego County, Chula Vista has a semi-arid climate (BSk), with mediterranean characteristics, though the winter rainfall is too low and erratic to qualify as an actual Mediterranean climate.

With a moderate climate where the annual averages seldom oscillate much, there has still been a 103 °F (39 °C) high and a 24 °F (−4 °C) low recorded since the station's inception in 1918. In 1949, the maximum daytime temperature was just 44 °F (7 °C) once, the lowest on record. Thanks to the maritime moderation, on average the coldest day is at a very mild 57 °F (14 °C). Summer nights are warmer than in coastal climates further north, but cooler than in the hot interior. The warmest low on record is 78 °F (26 °C) in 2016, while the warmest average night between 1991 and 2020 stood at 72 °F (22 °C).

Climate data for Chula Vista, California (1991−2020 normals, extremes 1918–present)
Month	Jan	Feb	Mar	Apr	May	Jun	Jul	Aug	Sep	Oct	Nov	Dec	Year
Record high °F (°C)	90 (32)	93 (34)	93 (34)	91 (33)	91 (33)	92 (33)	93 (34)	96 (36)	103 (39)	101 (38)	98 (37)	86 (30)	103 (39)
Mean maximum °F (°C)	81.2 (27.3)	80.3 (26.8)	81.7 (27.6)	82.1 (27.8)	80.1 (26.7)	80.1 (26.7)	82.9 (28.3)	86.6 (30.3)	92.4 (33.6)	89.5 (31.9)	86.7 (30.4)	79.1 (26.2)	94.7 (34.8)
Mean daily maximum °F (°C)	67.5 (19.7)	66.8 (19.3)	67.0 (19.4)	68.4 (20.2)	68.9 (20.5)	71.0 (21.7)	74.6 (23.7)	76.9 (24.9)	77.1 (25.1)	74.9 (23.8)	71.1 (21.7)	66.5 (19.2)	70.9 (21.6)
Daily mean °F (°C)	57.0 (13.9)	57.5 (14.2)	59.2 (15.1)	61.0 (16.1)	63.4 (17.4)	66.1 (18.9)	69.7 (20.9)	71.3 (21.8)	70.6 (21.4)	66.7 (19.3)	61.0 (16.1)	56.2 (13.4)	63.3 (17.4)
Mean daily minimum °F (°C)	46.5 (8.1)	48.3 (9.1)	51.4 (10.8)	53.5 (11.9)	58.0 (14.4)	61.2 (16.2)	64.7 (18.2)	65.8 (18.8)	64.0 (17.8)	58.5 (14.7)	50.9 (10.5)	46.0 (7.8)	55.7 (13.2)
Mean minimum °F (°C)	38.0 (3.3)	40.2 (4.6)	43.0 (6.1)	46.3 (7.9)	51.5 (10.8)	56.0 (13.3)	59.9 (15.5)	61.0 (16.1)	56.2 (13.4)	49.5 (9.7)	42.1 (5.6)	37.4 (3.0)	34.8 (1.6)
Record low °F (°C)	24 (−4)	29 (−2)	32 (0)	36 (2)	41 (5)	43 (6)	51 (11)	53 (12)	43 (6)	36 (2)	33 (1)	28 (−2)	24 (−4)
Average precipitation inches (mm)	1.82 (46)	2.33 (59)	1.39 (35)	0.67 (17)	0.27 (6.9)	0.05 (1.3)	0.06 (1.5)	0.01 (0.25)	0.09 (2.3)	0.36 (9.1)	0.57 (14)	1.58 (40)	9.20 (234)
Average precipitation days (≥ 0.01 in)	5.0	6.8	5.0	3.3	1.4	0.4	0.3	0.3	0.5	1.3	2.8	5.4	32.5
Source: NOAA

== Demographics ==
Historical population
Census	Pop.	Note	%±
1920	1,718		—
1930	3,869		125.2%
1940	5,138		32.8%
1950	15,927		210.0%
1960	42,034		163.9%
1970	67,901		61.5%
1980	83,927		23.6%
1990	135,163		61.0%
2000	173,556		28.4%
2010	243,916		40.5%
2020	275,487		12.9%
2025 (est.)	275,533	▲	0.0%
U.S. Decennial Census; 1860–1870 1880-1890; 1900 1910 1920; 1930 1940 1950; 1960 1970 1980; 1990 2000 2010; 2020

=== 2022 American Community Survey ===
As of the 2022 American Community Survey estimates, there were 279,158 people and 85,487 households. The population density was 5,623.9 inhabitants per square mile (2,171.4/km^{2}). There were 89,711 housing units at an average density of 1,807.3 per square mile (697.8/km^{2}). The racial makeup of the city was 25.1% White, 23.0% some other race, 12.6% Asian, 5.0% Black or African American, 2.0% Native American or Alaskan Native, and 0.5% Native Hawaiian or Other Pacific Islander, with 31.7% from two or more races. Hispanics or Latinos of any race were 64.9% of the population.

Of the 85,487 households, 43.0% had children under the age of 18 living with them, 29.1% had seniors 65 years or older living with them, 54.5% were married couples living together, 6.9% were couples cohabitating, 13.1% had a male householder with no partner present, and 25.6% had a female householder with no partner present. The median household size was 3.25 and the median family size was 3.64.

The age distribution was 25.8% under 18, 9.7% from 18 to 24, 28.4% from 25 to 44, 23.8% from 45 to 64, and 12.3% who were 65 or older. The median age was 35.9 years. For every 100 females, there were 95.8 males.

The median income for a household was $101,190, with family households having a median income of $107,238 and non-family households $49,392. The per capita income was $36,572. Out of the 277,336 people with a determined poverty status, 10.1% were below the poverty line. Further, 13.0% of minors and 10.2% of seniors were below the poverty line.

In the survey, residents self-identified with various ethnic ancestries. People of German descent made up 3.4% of the population of the town, followed by Irish at 3.1%, English at 2.3%, Italian at 2.0%, French at 1.3%, American at 1.1%, Caribbean (excluding Hispanics) at 0.8%, Polish at 0.8%, Arab at 0.6%, Sub-Saharan African at 0.6%, Swedish at 0.6%, and Norwegian at 0.5%.

=== 2020 census ===
Chula Vista, California – racial and ethnic composition Note: the US Census treats Hispanic/Latino as an ethnic category. This table excludes Latinos from the racial categories and assigns them to a separate category. Hispanics/Latinos may be of any race.
Race / ethnicity (NH = Non-Hispanic)	Pop 2000	Pop 2010	Pop 2020	% 2000	% 2010	% 2020
White alone (NH)	55,042	49,641	43,720	31.71%	20.35%	15.87%
Black or African American alone (NH)	7,517	9,972	12,703	4.33%	4.09%	4.61%
Native American or Alaska Native alone (NH)	593	600	488	0.34%	0.25%	0.18%
Asian alone (NH)	18,410	33,581	40,841	10.61%	13.77%	14.83%
Native Hawaiian or Pacific Islander alone (NH)	883	1,105	1,140	0.51%	0.45%	0.41%
Other race alone (NH)	273	360	1,175	0.16%	0.15%	0.43%
Mixed-race or multiracial (NH)	4,765	6,591	10,722	2.75%	2.70%	3.89%
Hispanic or Latino (any race)	86,073	142,066	164,698	49.59%	58.24%	59.78%
Total	173,556	243,916	275,487	100.00%	100.00%	100.00%

=== 2010 ===
The 2010 United States census reported that Chula Vista had a population of 243,916. The population density was 4,682.2 inhabitants per square mile (1,807.8/km^{2}). The racial makeup of Chula Vista was 130,991 (53.7%) White, 11,219 (4.6%) African American, 1,880 (0.8%) Native American, 35,042 (14.4%) Asian, 1,351 (0.6%) Pacific Islander, 49,171 (20.2%) from other races, and 14,262 (5.8%) from two or more races. There were 142,066 Hispanic or Latino residents, of any race (58.2%).

The census reported that 242,180 people (99.3% of the population) lived in households, 656 (0.3%) lived in non-institutionalized group quarters, and 1,080 (0.4%) were institutionalized.

There were 75,515 households, out of which 36,064 (47.8%) had children under the age of 18 living in them, 42,153 (55.8%) were opposite-sex married couples living together, 12,562 (16.6%) had a female householder with no husband present, 4,693 (6.2%) had a male householder with no wife present. There were 3,720 (4.9%) unmarried opposite-sex partnerships, and 502 (0.7%) same-sex married couples or partnerships. 12,581 households (16.7%) were made up of individuals, and 4,997 (6.6%) had someone living alone who was 65 years of age or older. The average household size was 3.21. There were 59,408 families (78.7% of all households); the average family size was 3.60.

There were 68,126 people (27.9%) under the age of 18, 24,681 people (10.1%) aged 18 to 24, 70,401 people (28.9%) aged 25 to 44, 56,269 people (23.1%) aged 45 to 64, and 24,439 people (10.0%) who were 65 years of age or older. The median age was 33.7 years. For every 100 females, there were 93.9 males. For every 100 females age 18 and over, there were 90.2 males.

There were 79,416 housing units at an average density of 1,524.5 per square mile (588.6/km^{2}), of which 43,855 (58.1%) were owner-occupied, and 31,660 (41.9%) were occupied by renters. The homeowner vacancy rate was 2.4%; the rental vacancy rate was 4.5%. 143,330 people (58.8% of the population) lived in owner-occupied housing units and 98,850 people (40.5%) lived in rental housing units.

=== Late 20th century ===
In 2000, the city's population was 173,556. The racial make up of the city during the 2000 census was 55.1% White, 22.1% other, 11% Asian, 5.8% of two or more races, 4.6% African American, 0.8% Native American, and 0.6% Pacific Islander. Hispanic or Latino people of any race were 49.6%. Of these individuals, 28.7% were under the age of 18.

In 1990, the city's population was 135,163. The racial make up of the city during the 1990 census was 67.7% White, 8.2% Asian, 4.5% African American, 0.6% Pacific Islander, 0.6% Native American, and 18.1% of other races,. Hispanic or Latino residents of any race were 37.2%. Of these individuals, 26% were under the age of 18.

In 1980, the city's population was 83,927. The racial make up of the city during the 1980 census was 83.1% White, 6.1% Asian and Pacific Islander, 2.1% African American, and 0.7% Native American, and 7.9% of other races. People of Hispanic or Latino origin made up 23.4% of the population.

== Economy ==
Chula Vista maintains a business atmosphere that encourages growth and development. In the city, the small business sector amounts for the majority of Chula Vista's business populace. This small business community is attributed to the city's growth and serves as a stable base for its economic engine.

In 2001 Dai Nippon Printing (DNP) stated that concentration of various ethnic groups in Chula Vista, which had multiple Japanese businesses and services, was one reason why the company chose to open an office there.

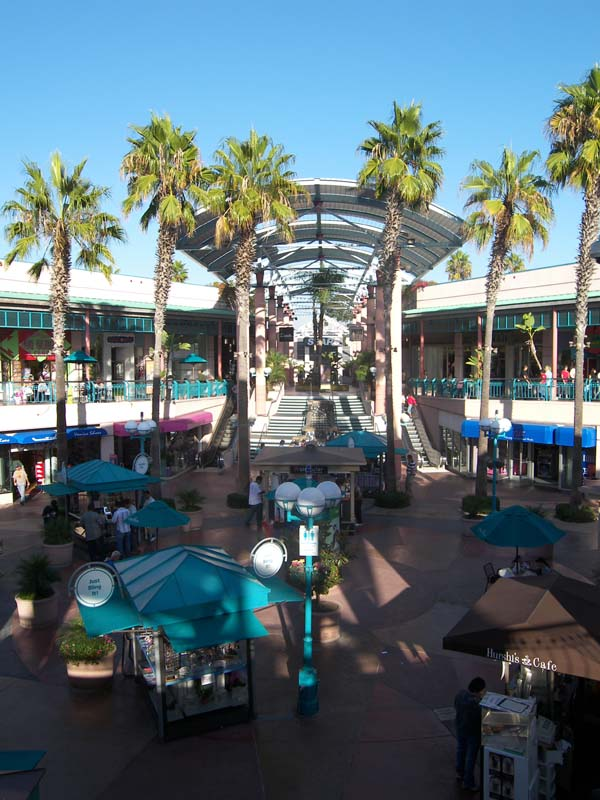
The Chula Vista shopping center

=== Tourism ===
Tourism serves as an economic engine for Chula Vista. The city has numerous dining, shopping, and cinema experiences. As with many California cities, Chula Vista features many golf courses. Some of the city's notable attractions included the Living Coast Discovery Center, Otay Valley Regional Park, North Island Credit Union Amphitheatre, OnStage Playhouse, Chula Vista Marina, Sesame Place San Diego, and the Chula Vista Elite Athlete Training Center. The Nature Center is home to interactive exhibits describing geologic and historic aspects of the Sweetwater Marsh and San Diego Bay. The center has exhibits on sharks, rays, waterbirds, birds of prey, insects, and flora. Otay Valley Regional Park is located partially within Chula Vista, where it covers the area of a natural river valley.

In the next two projected years, Chula vista will be home to a new park, the upcoming park will be in the Cota Vera neighborhood, it is estimated to cost around $7.8 million. The park will be the first in the nation to honor Filipino American veterans. A monument in the park is currently under development; the monument is privately funded. It is planned to be designed by the Filipino-American Military Officers Association (FAMOS) and members of the community.

The marina at Chula Vista is located in South Bay including multiple marinas and being home to the Chula Vista Yacht Club. Sports fishing and whale watching charters operate the regional bay area. The Chula Vista Elite Athlete Training Center assists current and future elite athletes in archery, rowing, kayaking, soccer (association football), softball, field hockey, tennis, track and field, and cycling.

Chula Vista Center is the city's main shopping mall, opened in 1962.

In 2025, the Gaylord Pacific Resort & Convention Center opened in Chula Vista. It is one of the largest hotels in California.

=== Top employers ===
According to the city's 2025 Annual Comprehensive Financial Report, the top employers in the city are:

#	Employer	Employees
1	Sweetwater Union High School District	4,053
2	Chula Vista Elementary School District	3,508
3	Sharp Chula Vista Medical Center	3,131
4	Southwestern College	2,010
5	City of Chula Vista	1,540
6	Walmart	1,474
7	Rohr Inc./Goodrich Aerospace	1,303
8	Scripps Mercy Hospital Chula Vista	1,073
9	SBCS Corporation	1,000
10	Gaylord Pacific Resort & Convention Center	900

== Arts and culture ==
Chula Vista is home to OnStage Playhouse, the only live theater in South Bay, San Diego.

Other points of interest and events include the Chula Vista Nature Center, the J Street Harbor, and the Third Avenue Village. Downtown Chula Vista hosts a number of cultural events, including the famous Lemon Festival, Starlight Parade, and Chula Vista Rose Festival. North Island Credit Union Amphitheater is a performing arts theatre that was the areas first major concert music facility. OnStage Playhouse produces community theatre productions.

== Sports ==
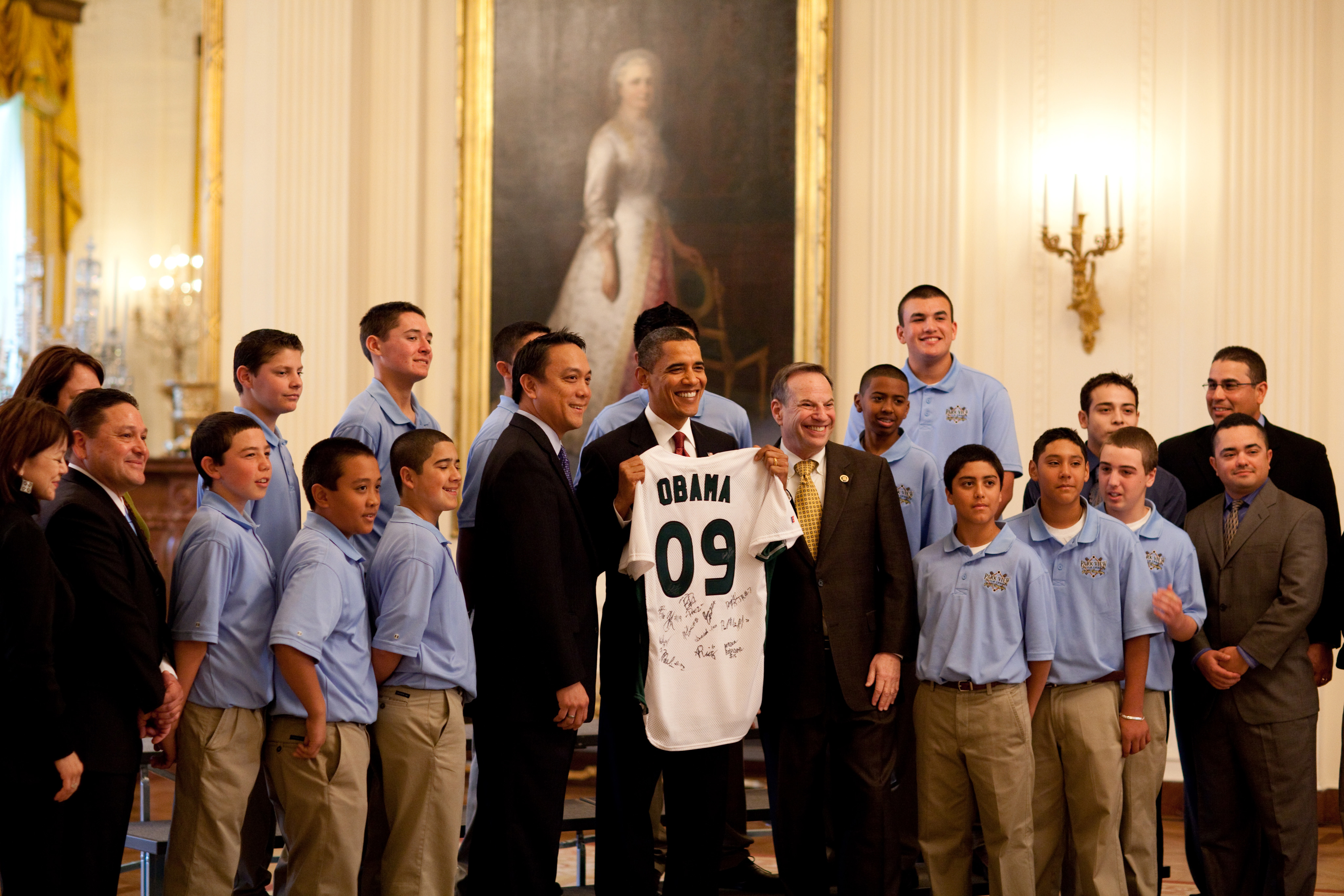
Barack Obama with the Chula Vista team that won the 2009 Little League World Series

Chula Vista is the site of the Chula Vista Elite Athlete Training Center, formerly the Olympic Training Center. The U.S. national rugby team practices at the OTC. Chula Vista is also home to Chula Vista FC which gained national attention with its 2015 Lamar Hunt U.S. Open Cup run.

In 2009 Parkview Little League won the 2009 Little League World Series, earning the nickname "The Blue Bombers".

In 2013 Eastlake Little League won the American Championship at the 2013 Little League World Series.

In 2018, Rebels SC soccer club formed the first ever United Premier Soccer League team for the city. They played in the San Diego County League for the first two years and won the second Division before the 2019–20 season was stopped due to Covid-19. The Rebels SC adult team were able to win the Fall 2021 South San Diego Division and reach the National Finals but ultimately losing to FC Arizona in the round of 32.

In 2026, Sweetwater Little League made it to the 2026 Little League World Series preliminary games, but was ultimately eliminated.

== Government ==
=== Municipal government ===
The City of Chula Vista is a California charter city operating under the council–manager government form. The council is composed of four members elected from geographic districts and led by a mayor who is elected by the entire city. The city council serves as the legislative body of the city, and it appoints a city manager to serve as chief administrator. Presently the city council is led by Mayor John McCann. It has four other members: Carolina Chavez (District 1), (Note: District 1 contains: Bonita Long Canyon, Eastlake, Rancho Del Rey, and Rolling Hills Ranch.) Jose Preciado (District 2), (Note: District 2 contains: Northwest Chula Vista (Bayfront, Central, and Hilltop) and Terra Nova.) Michael Inzunza (District 3), (Note: District 3 contains: Greg Rogers, Otay Ranch, Rancho Del Rey, Sunbow.) and Cesar Fernandez (District 4). (Note: District 4 contains: Southwest Chula Vista, Castlepark, Harborside, and Otay.) Each city council member is elected from a single-member district. Elections follow a two-round system. The first round of the election is called the primary election. The top-two candidates in the primary election advance to a runoff election, called the general election. Write-in candidates are only allowed to contest the primary election and are not allowed in the general election. Council members are elected to four-year terms, with a two-term limit. City council seats are all officially non-partisan by state law, although most members identify a party preference. The most recent general election was held in November 2024 for Districts 3 and 4. The next elections for these seats will be held in 2028. General elections for Mayor and Districts 1 and 2 were last held in November 2022. The next election for these seats will be in 2026.

According to the city's most recent Comprehensive Annual Financial Report, the city's various funds had $462.4 million in Revenues, $329.6 million in expenditures, $2.059 billion in total assets and $623.0 million in total liabilities. City of Chula Vista CAFR

The City of Chula Vista has named Christopher Manroe as its next Fire Chief, beginning on December 31, 2025. He will succeed Harry Muns, who is retiring after nearly three decades of service.

=== Politics ===
Following 2021 redistricting by the California Citizens Redistricting Commission, the city's federal representation is entirely within the 52nd congressional district. In the California State Senate, the city is entirely within the 18th Senate district. In the California State Assembly, it is entirely within the 80th Assembly district.

At the state and federal levels, Chula Vista is represented entirely by Democrats. In the State Senate, Chula Vista is represented by Democrat Steve Padilla. In the Assembly, it is represented by Democrat David Alvarez. In the United States Senate, it is represented by Alex Padilla and Adam Schiff, and in the United States House of Representatives, it is represented by Democrat Juan Vargas.

As of January 2013, out of the city's total population, 114,125 are registered to vote, up from 103,985 in 2009; the three largest registered parties in the city are the Democratic Party with 47,986, Republican Party with 31,633, and Decline to State with 29,692. In a survey conducted by The Bay Area Center for Voting Research in 2004, it found that Chula Vista had a 50.59% conservative vote compared to a 49.41% liberal vote.

== Education ==
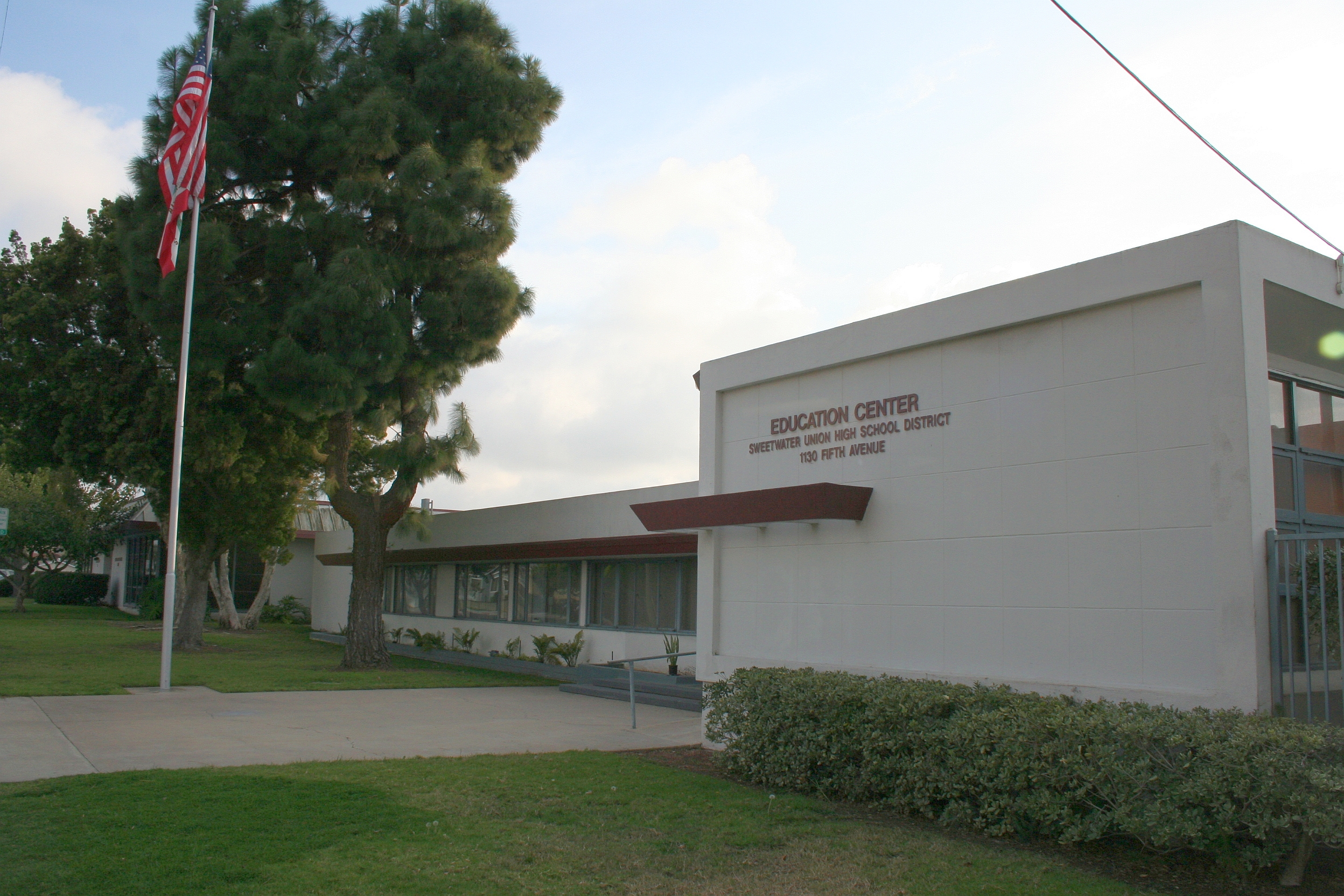
SUHSD headquarters

Most of Chula Vista is in the Chula Vista Elementary School District, while a few blocks are within the National Elementary School District. The Sweetwater Union High School District, headquartered in Chula Vista, serves as the secondary school district. The Chula Vista Elementary School District, the largest K-6 district in the State of California, with 44 campuses, serves publicly educated kindergarten through sixth grade students.

Chula Vista is home to Chula Vista Christian University (CVCU), one of the four private colleges in San Diego County, and is host to Southwestern College, a community college founded in 1961 that serves approximately 19,000 students annually.

The city has been trying since 1986 to get a university located in the city. In 1993, the city adopted the Otay Ranch General Development Plan, which included a four-year university as a part of its vision. In 2012, the city acquired a 375-acre (152 ha) parcel of land in the Otay Lakes area intended for the development of a University Park and Research Center, and chose a master developer for the project; who later backed out of the project. State Assemblymember Shirley Weber has proposed that the state open a satellite or extension campus of the California State University system at the site, with the hope that it will grow into a full university. CVCU was founded in 2020.

== Media ==
Chula Vista is served by The Star-News and The San Diego Union-Tribune.

== Infrastructure ==
=== Transportation ===
==== Major freeways and highways ====
Chula Vista is served by multiple Interstates and California State Routes. Interstate 5 begins to the south of the city and runs through its western edge. Interstate 5 connects Chula Vista to North County and beyond to Greater Los Angeles and Northern California. Interstate 805 serves as a bypass to Interstate 5, linking to the latter interstate in Sorrento Valley. State Route 54 and State Route 125 serve as highways to East County cities via northern and northeastern corridors.

==== Bus and rail ====
The San Diego Trolley serves Chula Vista via the Blue Line. The city is served by three stations: E Street, H Street, and Palomar Street Transit Center. The San Diego Metropolitan Transit System also operates 9 bus routes through and within the city including Rapid 225 which serves six stations in eastern Chula Vista.

== Sister cities ==
Chula Vista had two sister cities in 2011, as designated by Sister Cities International:

City	Province/state/prefecture	Country
Irapuato	Guanajuato	Mexico
Odawara	Kanagawa	Japan

Chula Vista is also a sister city to Cebu City, Philippines. In 2023, Chula Vista dissolved its commission that maintained its sister cities program. As of 2025, Chula Vista continues to send people to Odawara.

== See also ==
- List of U.S. cities with large Hispanic populations
- Mayoral elections in Chula Vista, California
