= Gaylord Texan Resort Hotel & Convention Center =

Hotel in Grapevine, Texas, United States

Gaylord Texan Resort & Convention Center
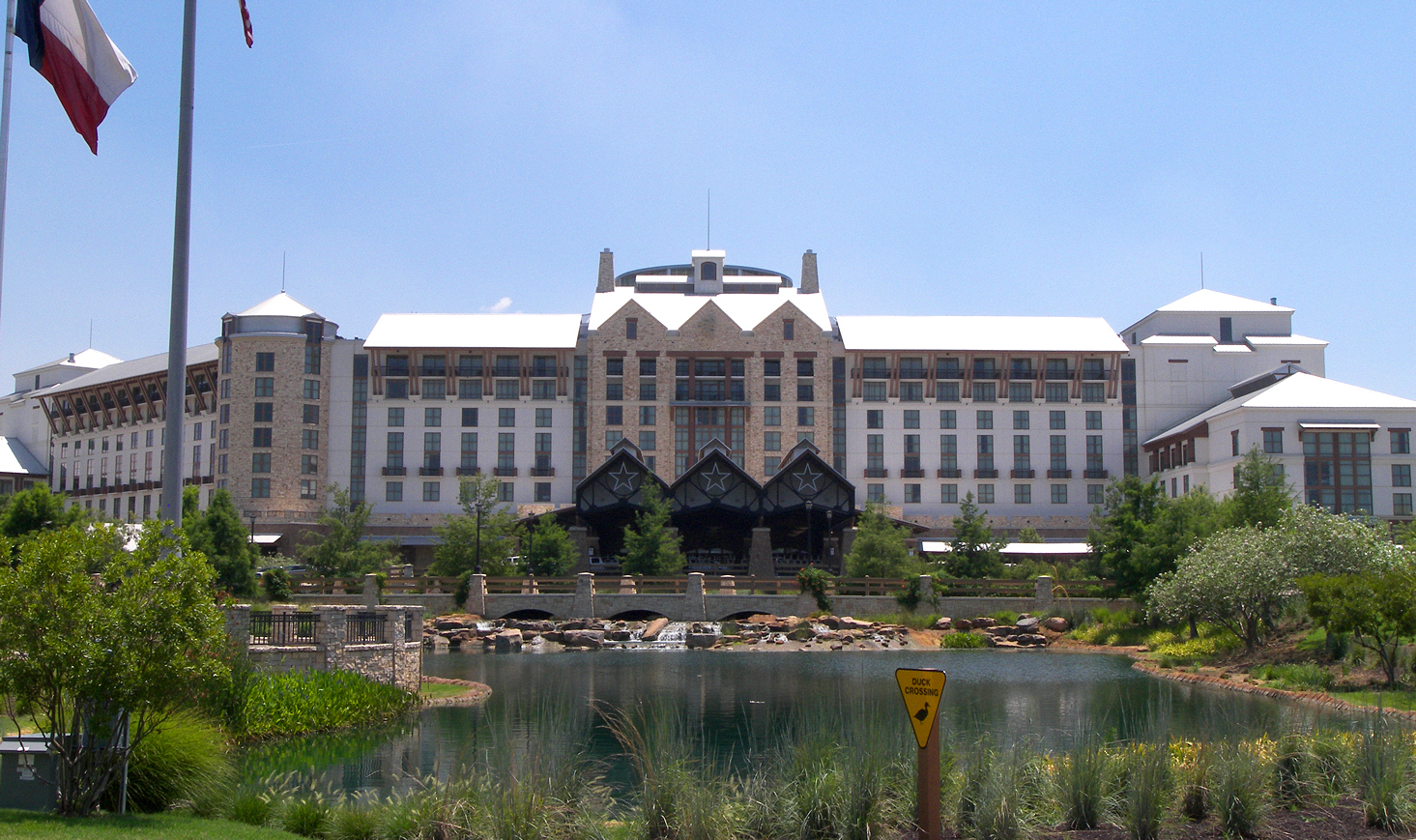
- Main entrance

- Location within Texas Location within the United States

General information
- Location: Grapevine, Texas
- Coordinates: 32.9539°N 97.0646°W
- Opening: April 2, 2004
- Owner: Ryman Hospitality Properties, Inc.
- Operator: Marriott International

Technical details
- Floor count: 9
- Floor area: (atrium: 4.5 acres, covered)

Design and construction
- Architects: Hnedak Bobo Group, Inc.
- Main contractor: Balfour Beatty Construction (formerly Centex Construction)

Other information
- Number of rooms: 1,814
- Number of suites: 127
- Number of restaurants: 4

Website
- www.gaylordhotels.com/gaylord-texan/

Gaylord Texan Resort & Convention Center is an American hotel and convention center in Grapevine, Texas, 30 minutes from Dallas–Fort Worth. It opened on April 2, 2004. It has 486,000 sq ft (45,200 m^{2}) of meeting space and 1,814 guest rooms.

Gaylord Texan is owned by Ryman Hospitality Properties (formerly known as Gaylord Entertainment Company), and operated by Marriott International. It is a sister hotel to the Gaylord Opryland Resort & Convention Center, Gaylord National Resort & Convention Center, and Gaylord Palms Resort & Convention Center.

The Glass Cactus nightclub located at the hotel was named one of Billboard magazine's 25 Hottest Clubs in North America in 2012.

== Annual events ==
The resort features an annual holiday event with different themes and corporate sponsors each year. The event is called ICE! or Lone Star Christmas. Each annual exhibit has a different theme, with past themes including Charlie Brown, Nutcracker, Shrek, and Frosty the Snowman.

Every year, starting with the second half of the NCAA Division I Football season, the College Football Playoff committee convenes at the hotel on a weekly basis to rank the top 25 teams in its weekly rankings, with their final meeting determining which four teams will advance to play for the National Championship.

== History ==
In 2004, 2005, 2009, 2017, 2018, and 2023 through 2026, it was the location of QuakeCon, a gaming convention based in Texas.

In January 2020, Gaylord Texan hosted Heavy Duty Aftermarket Week, an annual gathering of the heavy-duty truck industry. Gaylord Hotels across the U.S. closed in March 2020 due to the COVID-19 pandemic. All of them, including Gaylord Texan, re-opened with new safety protocols in June 2020.

The resort hosted the National Conference of the Technology Student Association (TSA) from June 28 through July 2, 2015, as well as the 2022 National TSA Competition.

In 2023, Gaylord Texan hosted the annual meeting of the National Association of Landscape Professionals.

In June 2025, the Turning Point USA Young Women's Leadership Summit was held at the resort.

The 2026 Conservative Political Action Conference was held at the resort in late March 2026.

== See also ==
- List of hotels in the United States § Texas
- Silver Lake, Texas
