= Gaylord Pacific Resort & Convention Center =

Hotel in California

General information
- Location: 1000 H St; Chula Vista, California, Chula Vista
- Coordinates: 32.6276°N 117.1006°W
- Groundbreaking: May 30, 2022
- Opening: May 15, 2025
- Cost: $1.3 Billion USD
- Owner: Ira Mitzner and Luke Charlton
- Operator: Marriott International

Height
- Height: 337 ft

Technical details
- Floor count: 22
- Grounds: 36 acre 1,568,000 sq ft

Design and construction
- Architecture firm: HKS, Inc.
- Developer: RIDA Development

Other information
- Number of rooms: 1,600 Rooms 4 Ballrooms
- Number of suites: 89
- Number of restaurants: 12
- Facilities: Water Park - 4 acres Surf Simulator Wave Pool Lazy River
- Parking: 500,000 sq ft parking garage 16 EV charging stations

The Gaylord Pacific Resort & Convention Center is a hotel located in Chula Vista, California. It is operated by Gaylord Hotels, a subsidiary of Marriott International.

== History ==
The Gaylord Pacific Resort & Convention Center opened on May 15, 2025 and became the largest hotel in California upon its opening. The hotel had been part of Chula Vista's Bayfront Master plan since roughly 2002. In August of 2012 the master plan was unanimously passed. In February of 2013 the South Bay Power Plant was demolished for the use of its land. It is the first Gaylord hotel property in the state and their sixth overall.

== Features ==
The hotel also includes dining options and convention space. The convention center contains 477,000 square feet of convention and meeting space which also includes ballrooms. A 4.25 acre water park is also part of the resort.
