= List of people from Chula Vista, California =

The following notable people were born in, residents of, attended an education institution in, or otherwise closely associated with the city of Chula Vista, California. Notation next to name is not what they are notable for, but how they are connected to the city.

== Business ==
- William Bradley - Michelin-starred chef born in Chula Vista
- Corky McMillin - resided in Chula Vista in 1944 prior to moving to Bonita
- Brent R. Wilkes - grew up in Chula Vista; entrepreneur, defense contractor, civic leader and philanthropist

== Crime ==
- John Ronald Brown - surgeon who was convicted of second-degree murder; lived in Chula Vista while practicing medicine in Tijuana, Baja California, Mexico
- Richard "Cheeks" Buchanan - Mexican Mafia member; originally from Chula Vista's Otay neighborhood
- Andrew Cunanan - murderer of Gianni Versace; attended Bonita Vista Middle School
- Robert Alton Harris - murderer who was executed by gas; resided in Chula Vista with his father during his late teen years
- Jose Alberto "Bat" Marquez - Mexican Mafia member; resided in Chula Vista's Castle Park neighborhood for a time
- Larry Millete - suspect in the disappearance of his wife, Maya Millete
- Christopher George "Chris Petti" Poulos - Chula Vista resident and Chicago Outfit associate who ran a mafia crew out of San Diego; jokingly dubbed "the Rodney Dangerfield" of the mafia by the FBI

== Entertainment ==
=== Actors and actresses ===
- Michael C. Burgess - actor and former editor of The Star-News
- Charisma Carpenter - attended Bonita Vista High School, graduated from Chula Vista High School, class of 1988
- Grey DeLisle - graduated from Chula Vista High School, class of 1991
- Rita Hayworth - lived in Chula Vista in the 1930s
- Walter Emanuel Jones - attended Chula Vista High School
- Mario Lopez - graduated from Chula Vista High School, class of 1991
- Sean Murray - graduated from Bonita Vista Middle School
- Jennifer Paredes - graduated from Otay Ranch High School
- Jenna Presley - graduated from Hilltop High School, class of 2005
- Carmen Serano - born in Chula Vista
- Johnny Sheffield - lived and died in Chula Vista

=== Bands ===
- Ati's Warriors - funk-punk fusion band formed in Chula Vista after the breakup of Unbroken, includes Chula Vista natives Atilla Moran (vocals) and Rob Moran (Keytar)
- Some Girls - San Diego hardcore collective that included Chula Vista natives Sal Gallegos III (drums) and Rob Moran (guitar)
- Unbroken - San Diego hardcore band co-formed by Chula Vista native Rob Moran (bass); Unbroken was closely associated with the Chula Vista hardcore punk scene
- The Zeros - punk band formed in Chula Vista

=== Comedians ===
- Mary Castillo - graduated from Chula Vista High School, class of 1992
- Gabriel Iglesias - spent early childhood in Chula Vista

=== Models ===
- Raquel Pomplun - Playboy's 2013 Playmate of the Year, Chula Vista native and Southwestern College alum

=== Musicians ===
- Matt Cameron - drummer for Soundgarden and Pearl Jam, attended Bonita Vista High School
- Marcos Curiel - guitarist for P.O.D. and The Accident Experiment; Chula Vista native, and graduated from Bonita Vista High School, class of 1992
- Gonjasufi - Chula Vista native
- Robert Lopez - guitarist for The Zeros, man behind stage persona of El Vez, attended Chula Vista High School
- Ilan Rubin - drummer for Nine Inch Nails and Angels & Airwaves, drummed on Paramore self-titled Grammy-winning album, youngest member inaugurated into the Rock and Roll Hall of Fame, went to Bonita Vista Middle School and Bonita Vista High School
- Jessica Sanchez - second place on American Idol, season 11
- Julieta Venegas - attended Southwestern College
- Tom Waits - graduated from Hilltop High School

=== Wrestlers ===
- Konnan - resides in Eastlake, Chula Vista
- Rey Mysterio Jr. - born in Chula Vista

=== Writers ===
- Costa Dillon - graduated from Bonita Vista High School
- Neil Raymond Ricco - lived in Chula Vista in the 2000s
- J. Michael Straczynski - attended Southwestern College
- Joan D. Vinge - graduated from Hilltop High School, class of 1965

== Government ==
=== Criminal justice ===
- A. J. Irwin - grew up in Chula Vista; former federal agent

=== Military ===
- John William Finn – Medal of Honor recipient, lived in the Veterans Home of Chula Vista for a short period before his death
- George T. Garrett – US Army major general, raised and educated in Chula Vista
- John J. McGinty – Medal of Honor recipient, resides in Chula Vista
- Charles Miller – US Army officer who served as Commandant of the United States Army Command and General Staff College
- Melvin Storer – Chula Vista resident, United States Navy shipfitter who survived the attack on Pearl Harbor

=== Politics ===
- Brian Bilbray - attended Southwestern College, 1970–1974
- Cheryl Cox - graduated from Hilltop High School, class of 1966; mayor of Chula Vista
- Greg Cox - San Diego County Supervisor
- Bob Filner - former Representative of California's 51st congressional district, 35th mayor of San Diego
- Kyle Foggo - graduated from Hilltop High School, former executive director of the Central Intelligence Agency
- Shirley Horton - attended Bonita Vista High School
- Ur Jaddou - 6th director of United States Citizenship and Immigration Services
- Steve Padilla - California State Senator
- Nick Popaditch - Chula Vista resident; Congressional candidate
- Mary Salas - Chula Vista mayor (2013–2022)

== Sports ==
=== Baseball ===
- Greg Allen - outfielder for the New York Yankees, attended Hilltop High School
- Brian Barden - retired MLB and NPB infielder, attended St. Pius Elementary School
- Marshall Boze - retired MLB and NPB pitcher, attended Southwestern College
- Calvin Faucher - pitcher for Tampa Bay Rays, born in Chula Vista, graduated from Hilltop High School
- Benji Gil - former MLB infielder; former infield coach for the Anaheim Angels, graduated from Castle Park High School, class of 1991
- Adrián González - retired MLB first baseman, graduated from Eastlake High School, class of 2000
- Tommy Hinzo - retired MLB and CPBL second baseman for Cleveland Indians, graduated from Hilltop High School and attended Southwestern College
- Mike Jacobs - retired MLB first baseman, born and raised in Chula Vista, graduated from Hilltop High School
- John Jaso - retired MLB position player, born in Chula Vista
- Marcelo Mayer - shortstop, fourth overall pick in the 2021 MLB Draft by the Boston Red Sox, graduated from Eastlake High School, class of 2021
- John Tortes "Chief" Meyers - MLB catcher, lived in Chula Vista for a period in the 1930s
- Kevin Mitchell - retired MLB position player, San Diego native who lived in Chula Vista
- Bob Natal - retired MLB catcher, graduated from Hilltop High School, class of 1983
- Todd Pratt - retired MLB catcher, attended Hilltop High School
- Carlos Quentin - retired MLB outfielder, raised in Chula Vista, attended St. Pius Elementary School
- Johnny Ritchey - first African American to play in the Pacific Coast League, lived in Chula Vista after he retired from baseball
- Alfonso Rivas - MLB first baseman, resided in Chula Vista as a child after moving from Tijuana, Mexico
- Alex Sanabia - pitcher for the Los Angeles Angels of Anaheim, graduated from Castle Park High School
- Casey Schmitt - infielder for the San Francisco Giants, graduated from Eastlake High School
- Daniel Schneemann - infielder for the Cleveland Guardians, graduated from Bonita Vista High School, class of 2015
- Jose Silva - retired MLB and LMB pitcher, graduated from Hilltop High School, class of 1991
- Ty Wigginton - retired MLB third baseman, graduated from Chula Vista High School, class of 1995
- Joel Zumaya - retired MLB relief pitcher, born and raised in Chula Vista, graduated from Bonita Vista High School

=== Basketball ===
- Adrian Garcia Marquez - play-by-play announcer for the Los Angeles Lakers, raised in Chula Vista and attended Southwestern College

=== Football ===
- Donnie Edwards - linebacker, Chula Vista native, graduated from Chula Vista High School, class of 1991
- John Fox - former NFL head coach with Carolina Panthers, Denver Broncos, and Chicago Bears; graduated from Castle Park High School and attended Southwestern College
- Jerome Haywood - defensive tackle in the CFL, attended Castle Park High School
- Tony Jefferson - safety for the Arizona Cardinals, graduated from Eastlake High School, class of 2010
- Moses Moreno - quarterback, Chula Vista native, graduated from Castle Park High School
- Zeke Moreno - linebacker, Chula Vista native, graduated from Castle Park High School
- Jason Myers - placekicker for Seattle Seahawks including part of the Super Bowl LX winning team; previously was placekicker for the Jacksonville Jaguars and the New York Jets, born in Chula Vista, attended Mater Dei
- Ogemdi Nwagbuo - defensive tackle for the Carolina Panthers, attended Southwestern College
- Luis Perez - quarterback for Los Angeles Rams, attended Southwestern College
- Steve Riley - offensive tackle, born and raised in Chula Vista, attended Castle Park High School
- Scott Shields - safety, graduated from Bonita Vista High School

=== Golf ===
- Billy Casper - graduated from Chula Vista High School, class of 1950

=== Hockey ===
- Craig Coxe - born in Chula Vista

=== Horse racing ===
- Charles E. Whittingham - Hall of Fame trainer, born in Chula Vista

=== Mixed martial arts ===
- Dominick Cruz - resides in Chula Vista
- Shannon Gugerty - Chula Vista native, graduated from Hilltop High School
- Dean Lister - graduated from Hilltop High School, class of 1994
- Brandon Vera - resides in Chula Vista

=== Soccer ===
- Charles Adair - forward and coach
- Fernando Arce Jr. - midfielder
- Paul Arriola - midfielder who represented the United States men's national team
- Jennifer Lalor - midfielder who represented the United States women's national team
- Cesar Romero - forward
- Brandon Vázquez - forward who represented the United States men's national team

=== Track and field ===
- Tim Danielson - attended Chula Vista High School
- Desiree Davila - attended Hilltop High School in Chula Vista

=== Volleyball ===
- John Cook - born in Chula Vista, retired college women's volleyball coach

== Other ==
- Hector X. "Shipwreck" Delgado - born in Chula Vista; fictional character from the G.I. Joe: A Real American Hero toy line and cartoon series
- M. Brian Maple - physicist at UCSD, born in Chula Vista
- John Rojas, Jr. - historian, founded Chula Vista Historical Society (which later merged with Chula Vista Heritage Museum)
- Wolfman Jack - radio personality who broadcast out of XERB in Chula Vista during the 1960s
