= Mayoral elections in Chula Vista, California =

Elections are currently held every four years to elect the mayor of Chula Vista, California.

== 1990 ==
1990 Chula Vista mayoral election
- November 6, 1990
- Turnout: 55.77%
Candidate	Gayle McCandliss	Bob Piantedosi
Party	Nonpartisan	Nonpartisan
Popular vote	21,815	7,866
Percentage	73.50%	26.50%
Mayor before election
Gregory R. Cox
Elected mayor
Gayle McCandliss

The 1990 Chula Vista mayoral election was held on November 6, 1990. It saw the election of Gayle McCandliss.

General election results
Candidate	Votes	%
Gayle McCandliss	21,815	73.50
Bob Piantedosi	7,866	26.50
Total votes	29,681	100

== 1991 ==
1991 Chula Vista special election
- June 4, 1991
- Turnout: 23.84%
Candidate	Tim Nader	Frank Scott
Party	Nonpartisan	Nonpartisan
Popular vote	5,878	3,355
Percentage	36.14%	20.63%
Candidate	Chris Chase	Nick Aguilar
Party	Nonpartisan	Nonpartisan
Popular vote	2,753	2,154
Percentage	16.93%	13.24%
Mayor before election
Gayle McCandliss
Elected mayor
Tim Nader
Republican

In January 1991, the incumbent mayor Gayle McCandliss died of cancer. A special election for the mayor position was held on June 4, 1991. It ended with the election of Tim Nader, a member of the city council.

Special election results
Candidate	Votes	%
Tim Nader	5,878	36.14
Frank Scott	3,355	20.63
Chris Chase	2,753	16.93
Nick Aguilar	2,154	13.24
Bob Beyerle	475	2.92
Bob Piantedosi	463	2.85
David E. Campbell	450	2.77
Fred Drew	324	1.99
Jerry Forbes	251	1.54
Joseph O. Albert	112	0.69
Mark Boltz	50	0.31
Total votes	16,265	100

== 1994 ==
1994 Chula Vista mayoral election
- June 7, 1994
- Turnout: 36.71%
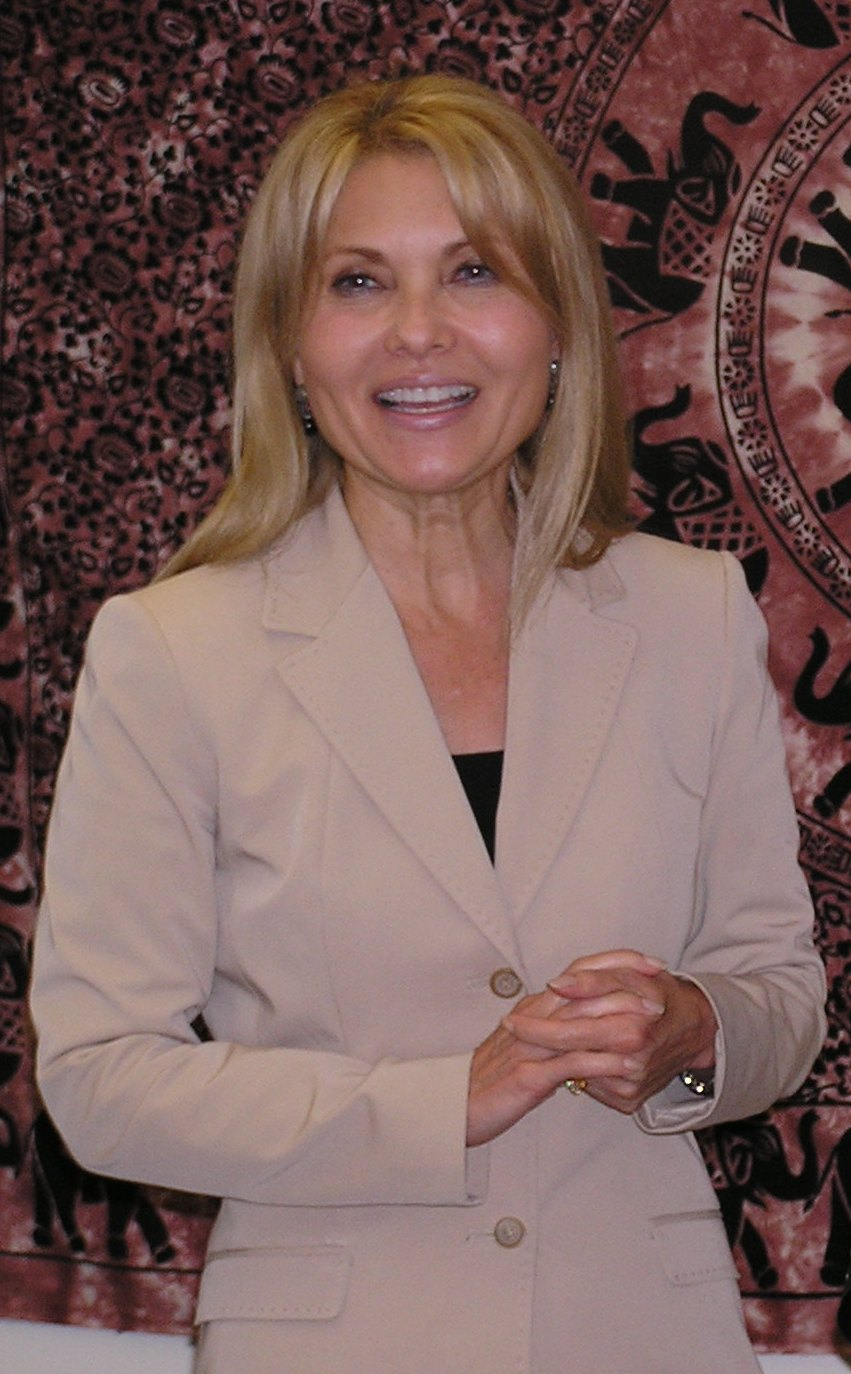
Candidate	Shirley Horton	Penny Allen
Party	Nonpartisan	Nonpartisan
Popular vote	10,248	6,778
Percentage	50.73%	33.55%
Candidate	Bob Piantedosi	Wayne Thomas Tucker
Party	Nonpartisan	Nonpartisan
Popular vote	1,660	1,516
Percentage	8.22%	7.50%
Mayor before election
Tim Nader
Democratic
Elected mayor
Shirley Horton
Republican

The 1994 Chula Vista mayoral election was held on June 7, 1994. The incumbent mayor Tim Nader did not seek reelection. Shirley Horton, a member of the city council, won the mayoral office with more than 50% of the votes in the primary election.

Primary election results
Candidate	Votes	%
Shirley Horton	10,248	50.73
Penny Allen	6,778	33.55
Bob Piantedosi	1,660	8.22
Wayne Thomas Tucker	1,516	7.50
Total votes	20,202	100

== 1998 ==
1998 Chula Vista mayoral election
- June 2, 1998
- Turnout: 40.74%
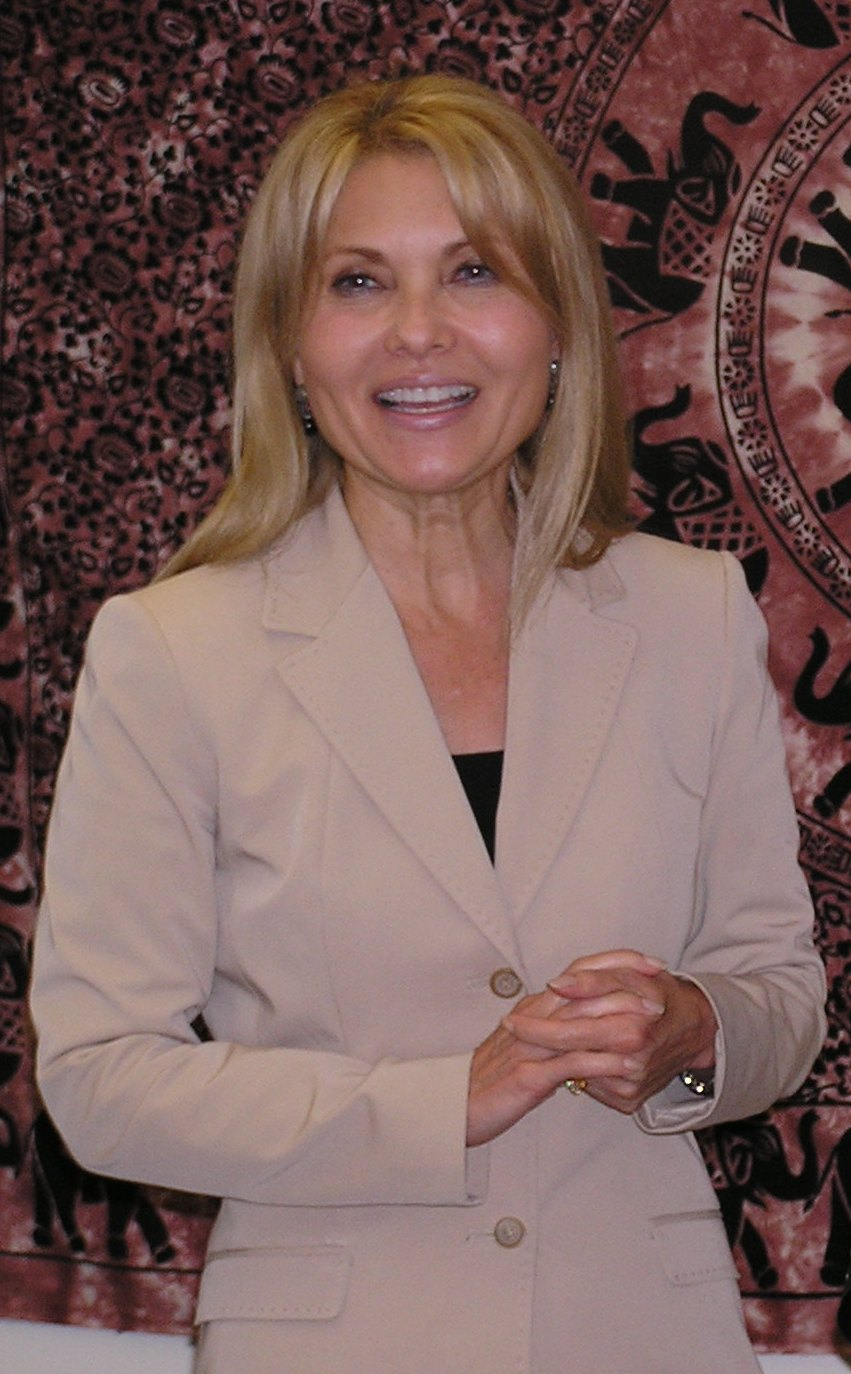
Candidate	Shirley Horton	Carolyn A. Malcolm
Party	Nonpartisan	Nonpartisan
Popular vote	17,991	2,664
Percentage	71.82%	10.63%
Candidate	Bob Piantedosi	Petra E. Barajas
Party	Nonpartisan	Nonpartisan
Popular vote	1,881	1,840
Percentage	7.51%	7.35%
Mayor before election
Shirley Horton
Republican
Elected mayor
Shirley Horton
Republican

The 1998 Chula Vista mayoral election was held on June 2, 1998. Incumbent mayor Shirley Horton secured her second term as mayor with over 70% of the votes in the primary election.

Primary election results
Candidate	Votes	%
Shirley Horton	17,991	71.82
Carolyn A. Malcolm	2,664	10.63
Bob Piantedosi	1,881	7.51
Petra E. Barajas	1,840	7.35
Everett E. Borha	675	2.69
Total votes	25,051	100

== 2002 ==
2002 Chula Vista mayoral election
- March 5, 2002 (P); November 5, 2002 (G)
- Turnout: 33.3% (P); 48.8% (G)
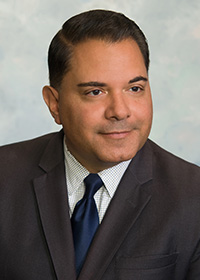

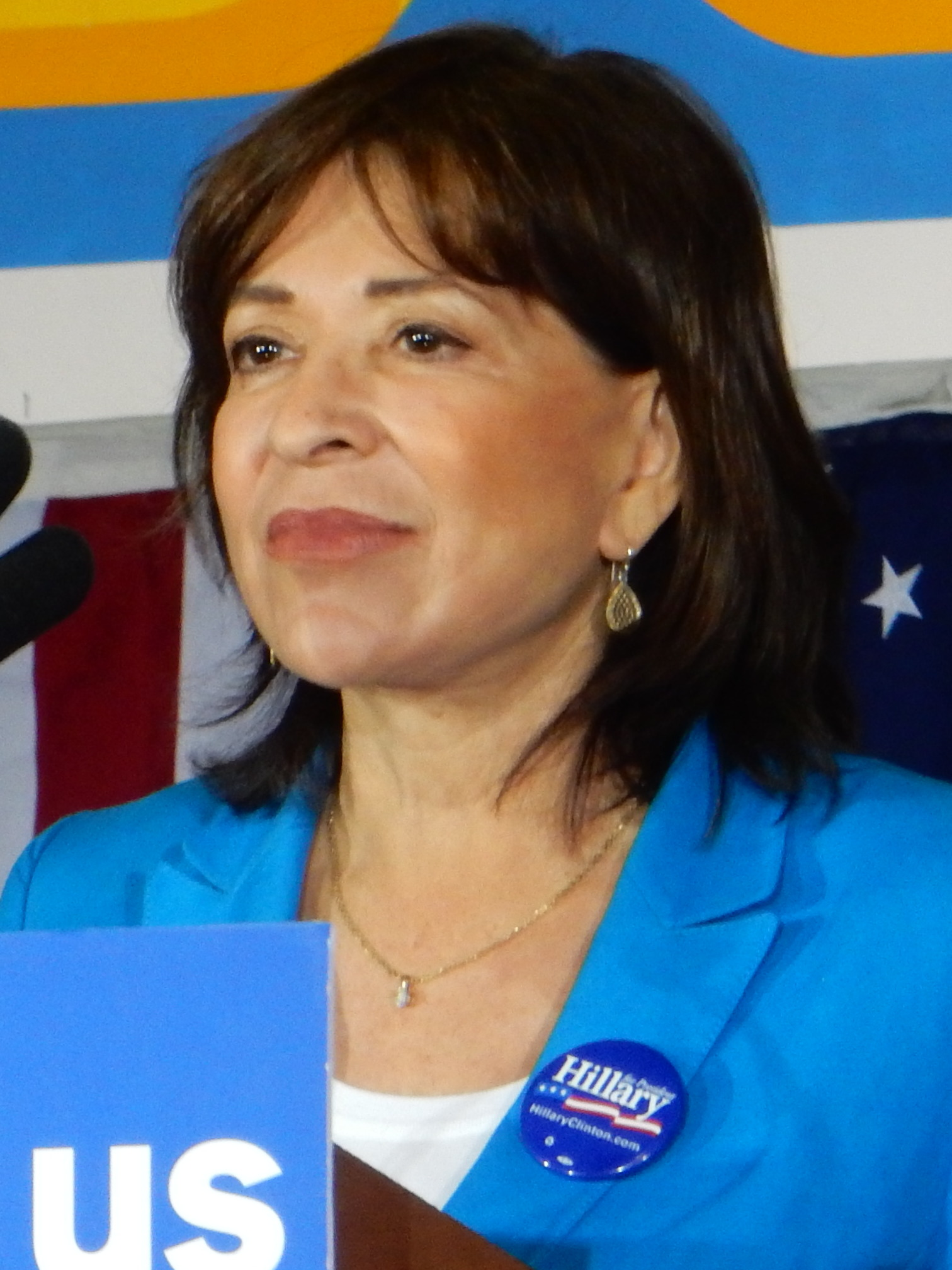
Candidate	Steve Padilla	Mary Salas	Petra E. Barajas
Party	Nonpartisan	Nonpartisan	Nonpartisan
Popular vote	10,519 (P); 19,000 (G)	10,699 (P); 16,304 (G)	996
Percentage	47.3% (P); 53.8% (G)	48.1% (P); 46.1% (G)	4.4%
Mayor before election
Shirley Horton
Republican
Elected mayor
Steve Padilla
Democratic

The 2002 Chula Vista mayoral election was held on November 5, 2002. Incumbent mayor Shirley Horton could not run for reelection due to term limit. Steve Padilla, a member of the city council, won the election.

Primary election results
Candidate	Votes	%
Mary Salas	10,699	48.1
Steve Padilla	10,519	47.3
Petra E. Barajas	996	4.4

General election results
Candidate	Votes	%
Steve Padilla	19,000	53.8
Mary Salas	16,304	46.1

== 2006 ==
2006 Chula Vista mayoral election
- June 6, 2006 (P); November 7, 2006 (G)
- Turnout: 37.29% (P); 57.15% (G)
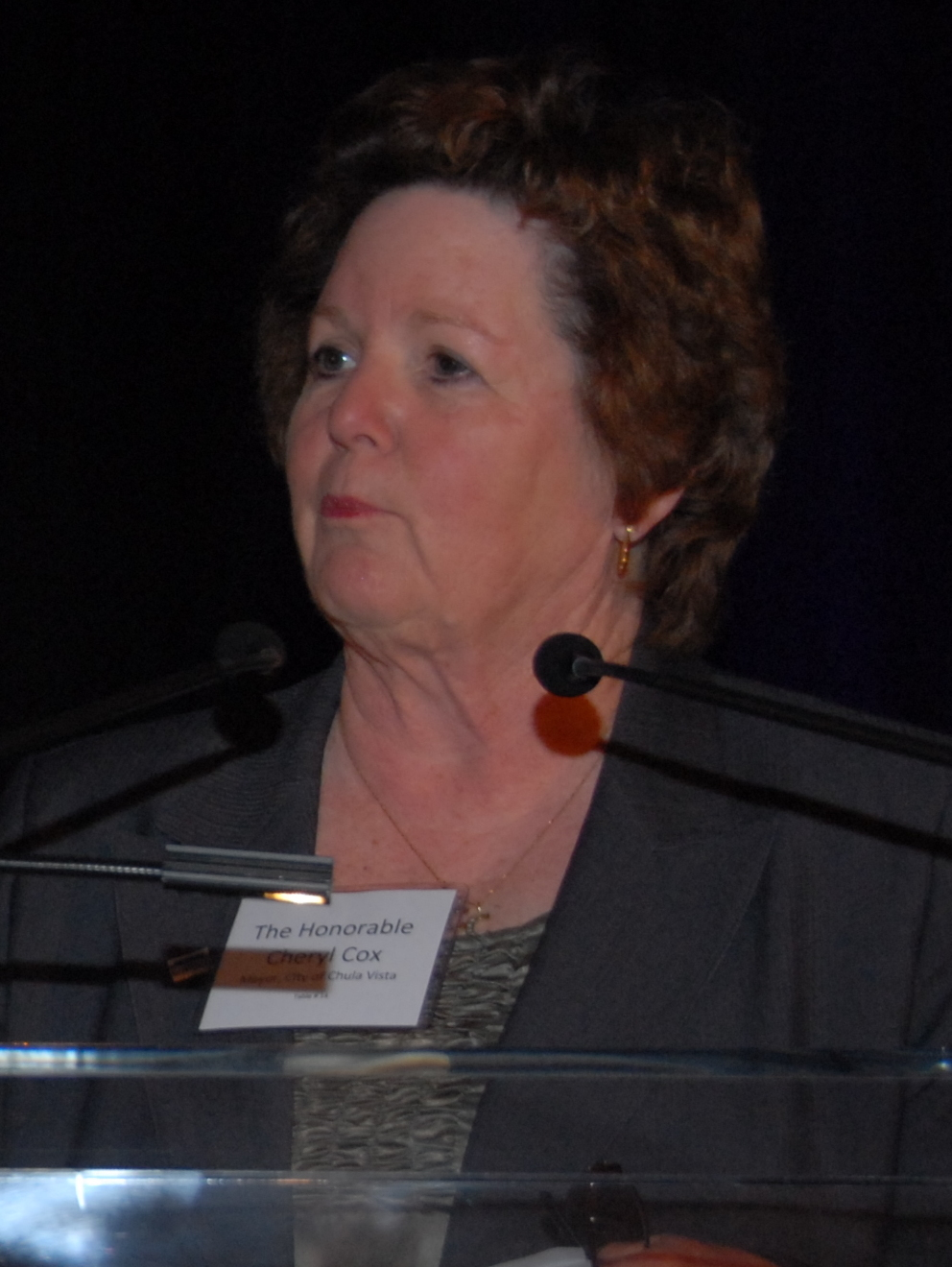

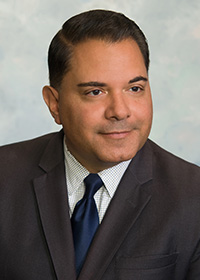
Candidate	Cheryl Cox	Steve Padilla
Party	Nonpartisan	Nonpartisan
Popular vote	11,394 (P); 23,124 (G)	8,681 (P); 19,509 (G)
Percentage	40.52% (P); 54.07% (G)	30.87% (P); 45.61% (G)
Candidate	Steve Castaneda	Ricardo Macias
Party	Nonpartisan	Nonpartisan
Popular vote	6,978	527
Percentage	24.81%	1.87%
Mayor before election
Steve Padilla
Democratic
Elected mayor
Cheryl Cox
Republican

The 2006 Chula Vista mayoral election was held on November 7, 2006. A primary election was held on June 6. Incumbent mayor Steve Padilla ran for reelection, but was defeated by Cheryl Cox, an administrator of Chula Vista Elementary School District.

Primary election results
Candidate	Votes	%
Cheryl Cox	11,394	40.52
Steve Padilla	8,681	30.87
Steve Castaneda	6,978	24.81
Ricardo Macias	527	1.87
Petra E. Barajas	478	1.70
Write-in	64	0.23
Total votes	28,122	100

General election results
Candidate	Votes	%
Cheryl Cox	23,124	54.07
Steve Padilla	19,509	45.61
Write-in	137	0.32
Total votes	42,770	100

== 2010 ==
2010 Chula Vista mayoral election
- June 8, 2010
- Turnout: 38.03%
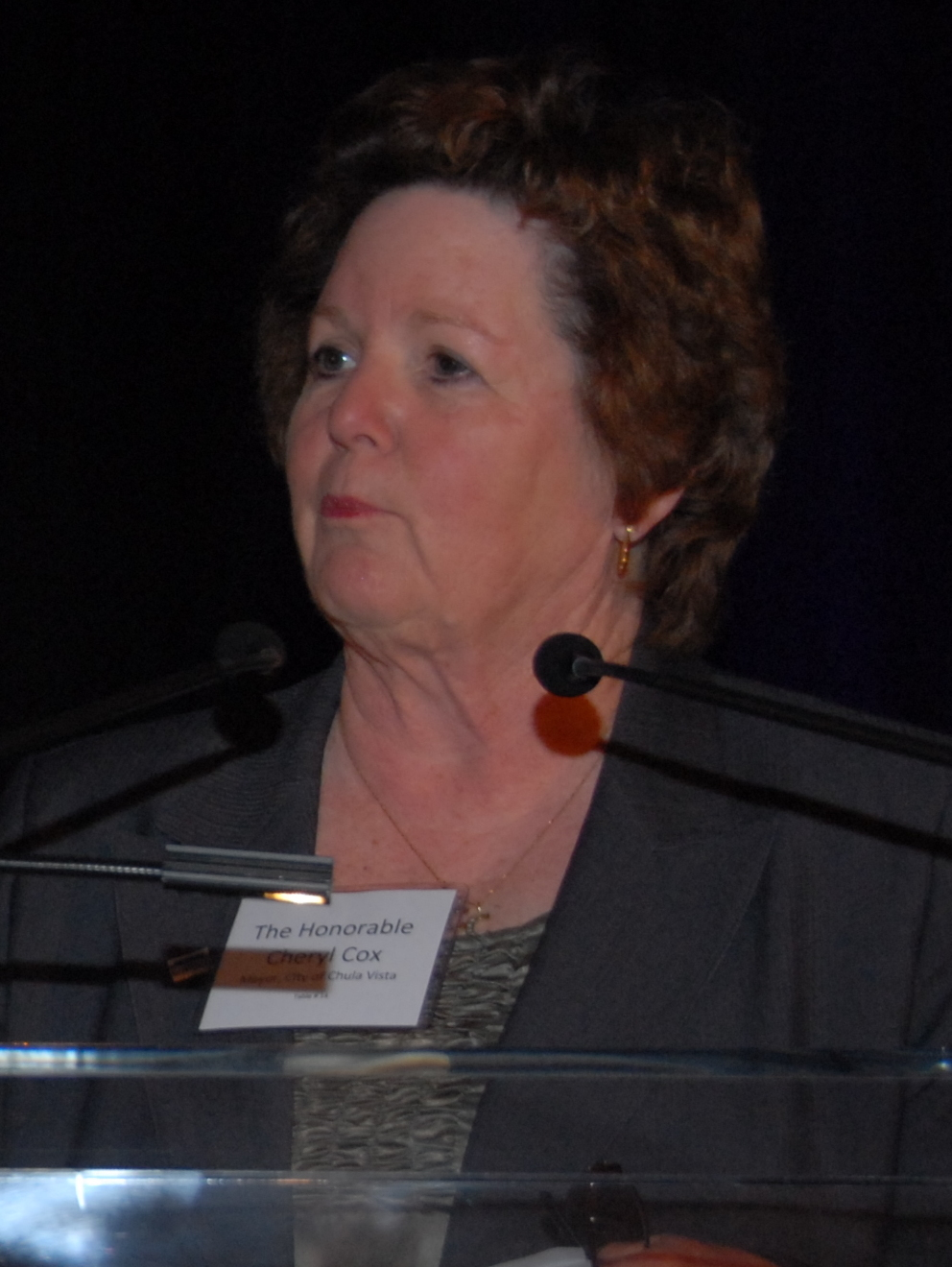
Candidate	Cheryl Cox	Steve Castaneda	Jorge Dominguez
Party	Nonpartisan	Nonpartisan	Nonpartisan
Popular vote	18,771	9,886	4,561
Percentage	56.31%	29.66%	13.68%
Mayor before election
Cheryl Cox
Republican
Elected mayor
Cheryl Cox
Republican

The 2010 Chula Vista mayoral election was held on June 8, 2010. This primary election resulted in the reelection of Cheryl Cox, as she gained over 50% of the votes.

Primary election results
Candidate	Votes	%
Cheryl Cox	18,771	56.31
Steve Castaneda	9,886	29.66
Jorge Dominguez	4,561	13.68
Write-in	115	0.35
Total votes	33,333	100

== 2014 ==
2014 Chula Vista mayoral election
- June 3, 2014 (P); November 4, 2014 (G)
- Turnout: 27.23% (P); 44.76% (G)
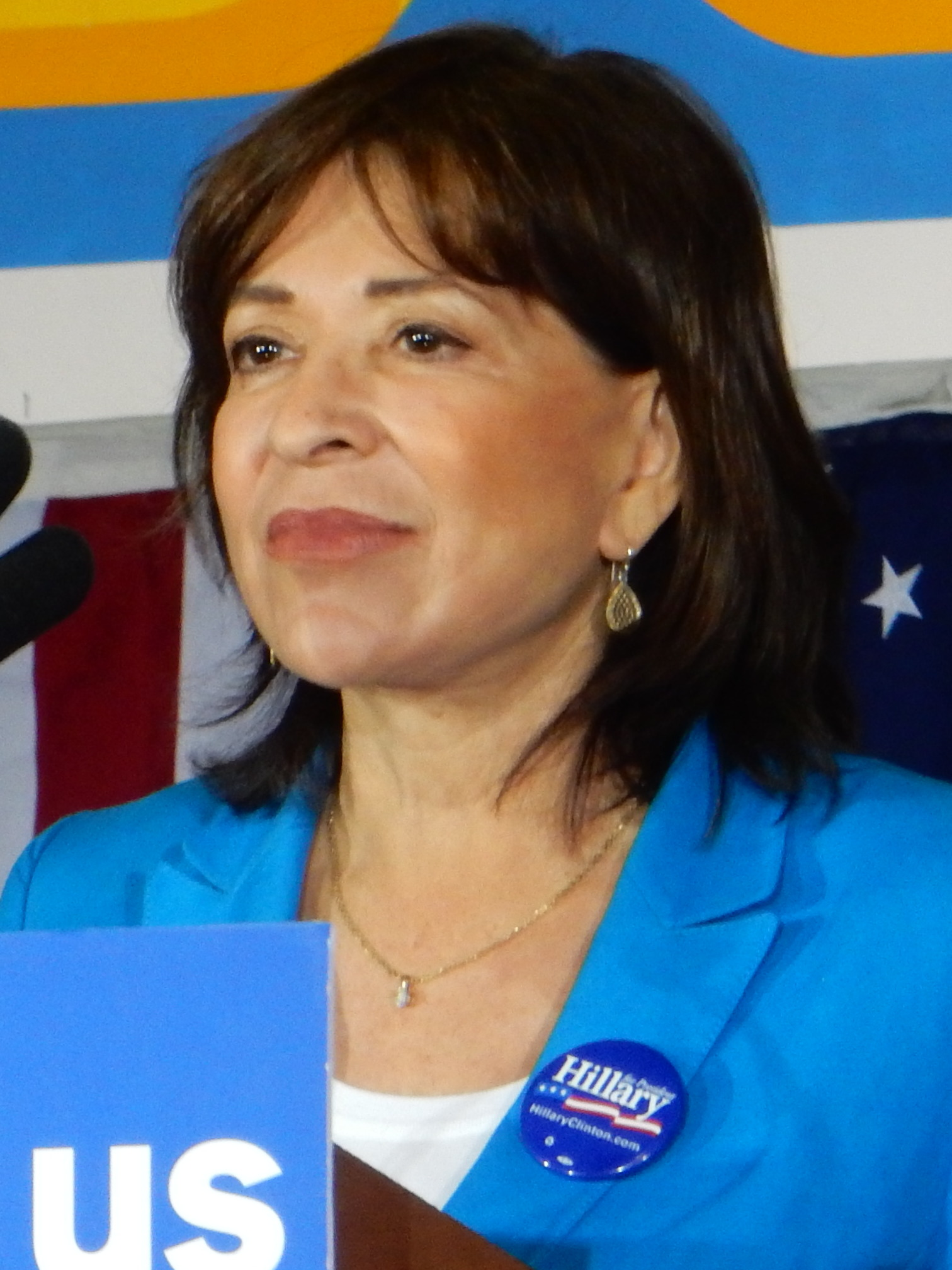
Candidate	Mary Salas	Jerry R. Rindone	Pamela Bensoussan
Party	Nonpartisan	Nonpartisan	Nonpartisan
Popular vote	9,808 (P); 19,995 (G)	8,638 (P); 17,827 (G)	3,732
Percentage	44.07% (P); 52.87% (G)	38.82% (P); 47.13% (G)	16.77%
Mayor before election
Cheryl Cox
Republican
Elected mayor
Mary Salas
Democratic

The 2014 Chula Vista mayoral election was held on November 4, 2014. It saw the election of Mary Salas, a member of the city council.

The incumbent mayor Cheryl Cox did not seek reelection due to term limit. A primary election took place on June 3 to determine the two candidates for the general election.

Primary election results
Candidate	Votes	%
Mary Salas	9,808	44.07
Jerry R. Rindone	8,638	38.82
Pamela Bensoussan	3,732	16.77
Write-in	75	0.34
Total votes	22,253	100

General election results
Candidate	Votes	%
Mary Salas	19,995	52.87
Jerry R. Rindone	17,827	47.13
Total votes	37,822	100

== 2018 ==
2018 Chula Vista mayoral election
- June 5, 2018 (P); November 6, 2018 (G)
- Turnout: 39.8% (P); 66.4% (G)
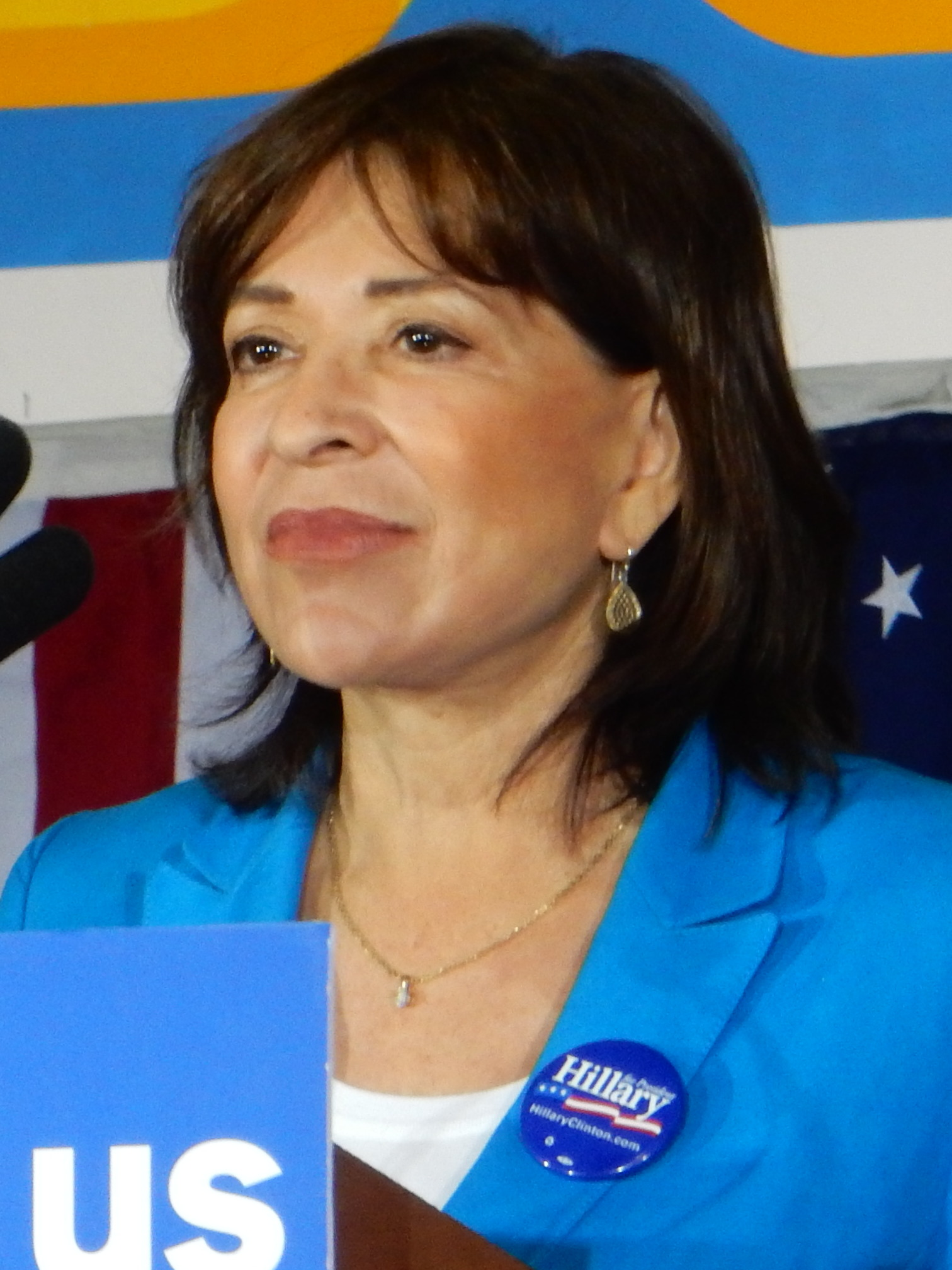
Candidate	Mary Salas	Hector Gastelum
Party	Nonpartisan	Nonpartisan
Popular vote	24,572 (P); 54,062 (G)	6,676 (P); 21,175 (G)
Percentage	62.68% (P); 71.86% (G)	17.03% (P); 28.14% (G)
Candidate	Daniel Schreck	Arthur Kende
Party	Nonpartisan	Nonpartisan
Popular vote	4,408	3,547
Percentage	11.24%	9.05%
Mayor before election
Mary Salas
Democratic
Elected mayor
Mary Salas
Democratic

The 2018 Chula Vista mayoral election was held on November 6, 2018. A primary election was held on June 5 to select the candidates for the general election on November. Mary Salas, the incumbent mayor, won reelection to her second term.

Primary election results
Candidate	Votes	%
Mary Salas	24,572	62.68
Hector Gastelum	6,676	17.03
Daniel Schreck	4,408	11.24
Arthur Kende	3,547	9.05
Total votes	39,203	100

General election results
Candidate	Votes	%
Mary Salas	54,062	71.86
Hector Gastelum	21,175	28.14
Total votes	75,237	100

== 2022 ==
2022 Chula Vista mayoral election
- June 7, 2022 (P); November 8, 2022 (G)
- Turnout: 34.9% (P); 54.2% (G)
Candidate	John McCann	Ammar Campa-Najjar
Party	Nonpartisan	Nonpartisan
Popular vote	13,580 (P); 33,992 (G)	9,943 (P); 31,280 (G)
Percentage	30.82% (P); 52.08% (G)	22.56% (P); 47.92% (G)
Candidate	Jill M. Galvez	Zaneta Encarnacion
Party	Nonpartisan	Nonpartisan
Popular vote	8,689	5,974
Percentage	19.72%	13.56%
Mayor before election
Mary Salas
Democratic
Elected mayor
John McCann
Republican

The 2022 Chula Vista mayoral election was held on November 8, 2022. John McCann, a member of the city council, won the election.

Incumbent mayor Mary Salas could not seek reelection due to term limit. A primary election was held on June 7, 2022.

Primary election results
Candidate	Votes	%
John McCann	13,580	30.81
Ammar Campa-Najjar	9,943	22.56
Jill M. Galvez	8,689	19.72
Zaneta Encarnacion	5,974	13.56
Rudy Ramirez	3,008	6.83
Spencer Cash	2,840	6.44
Christine Brady	35	0.08
Total votes	44,069	100

General election results
Candidate	Votes	%
John McCann	33,992	52.08
Ammar Campa-Najjar	31,280	47.92
Total votes	65,272	100

== 2026 ==
2026 Chula Vista mayoral election
- June 2, 2026 (P); November 3, 2026 (G)
Candidate	John McCann	Francisco Tamayo
Party	Nonpartisan	Nonpartisan
Popular vote	48,875	37,936
Percentage	56.30	43.70
Mayor before election
John McCann
Republican
Elected mayor
John McCann
Republican

The 2026 Chula Vista mayoral election was held on November 3, 2026. Incumbent mayor, John McCann, won re-election for the second term.

Primary election results
Candidate	Votes	%
John McCann (incumbent)	30,921	56.08
Francisco Tamayo	21,801	39.54
Yair Gersten	2,413	4.38
Total votes	55,135	100.0

General election results
Candidate	Votes	%
John McCann (incumbent)	48,875	56.30
Francisco Tamayo	37,936	43.70
Total votes	86,811	100.0
