= Moses Moreno =

American football player (born 1975)

No. 4, 11, 13
- Position: Quarterback

Personal information
- Born: September 5, 1975 (age 51); Chula Vista, California, U.S.
- Listed height: 6 ft 1 in (1.85 m)
- Listed weight: 205 lb (93 kg)

Career information
- High school: Castle Park (Chula Vista)
- College: Colorado State
- NFL draft: 1998: 7th round, 232nd overall pick

Career history
- Chicago Bears (1998); San Diego Chargers (1999–2000)

Career NFL statistics
- Passing attempts: 103
- Passing completions: 51
- Completion percentage: 49.5%
- TD–INT: 1-2
- Passing yards: 485
- Passer rating: 58.1
- Stats at Pro Football Reference

Moses Nathaniel Moreno (born September 5, 1975) is an American former professional football player who was a quarterback in the National Football League (NFL). He played college football for the Colorado State Rams and was selected by the Chicago Bears in the seventh round of the 1998 NFL draft. He attended Castle Park High School, where he became a two-time all-conference selection.

== College career ==
Moreno played college football at Colorado State for three seasons, and had a career record of 22–8. In 1997, he was named the Western Athletic Conference Offensive Player of the Year, passing for 2,257 yards, 20 touchdowns and nine interceptions. Moreno also led the Rams to two Holiday Bowls in 1995 and 1997 (in which he was named co-MVP), and ended his career with a school-record 49 touchdown passes.

== Professional career ==
Moreno was drafted in the seventh round (232nd overall) by the Chicago Bears in the 1998 NFL draft, the final pick by that team in the draft. With the Bears, he started only one game in the 1998 season.

Moreno joined the San Diego Chargers the following season. In 2000, he replaced an ineffective Ryan Leaf for the Chargers against the Kansas City Chiefs and Miami Dolphins, completing 27 of 53 passes for 241 yards and two interceptions. On October 15, he was benched after losing two fumbles in three plays against the Buffalo Bills. On November 5, he led a 73-yard drive for a go-ahead field goal against the Seattle Seahawks, but Seattle rallied to win 17–15. He suffered a torn labrum and was released by the Chargers on May 19, 2001, to make room for Sam Rogers, brought back by San Diego on April 20, and released for good on May 18. He later tried out for the New York Jets, but was not signed.

On September 20 of 2001, the North County Times reported that Moreno filed a grievance against the Chargers, stating he was injured at the time of his release. He had surgery for the torn labrum on August 16. Moreno's agent, Peter Schaffer, said the Chargers had known of the injury, but not the extent of it. Moreno tried out for the Miami Dolphins in 2002, but was again not signed. In his NFL career, he started three games, while playing in six others. He completed 51 of 103 passes for 485 yards, one touchdown and two interceptions.

== Post-playing career ==
Since 2005, Moreno has been project manager at his father's HVAC business Able Heating & Air Conditioning. In 2011, Moreno became vice president of operations at Able in addition to project manager.

Moreno became an assistant coach for the football team at San Diego High School in 2008.

Moreno began officiating football in 2013 and is currently a member of the San Diego County Football Officials Association.

== Personal life ==
Moreno who is of Mexican descent, was born in Chula Vista, California and graduated from Castle Park High School of Chula Vista in 1993. Moreno earned his Bachelor of Science degree in kinesiology from Colorado State University in 1998.

His brother, Zeke Moreno, also played in the National Football League as a middle linebacker, and was drafted by the Chargers in the 2001 NFL draft.
