= Paradise Post =

Newspaper in Paradise, California

- Type: Twice weekly newspaper
- Owner: Digital First Media
- Founder: Linn J. Potter
- Publisher: Mazi Kavoosi
- Editor: Mike Wolcott
- Founded: 1945; 81 years ago
- Headquarters: 400 E. Park Ave. Chico, California
- City: Paradise, California
- Country: United States
- Website: paradisepost.com

The Paradise Post is a twice-a-week newspaper in Paradise, California. The newspaper is part of the Digital First Media corporation. It has a circulation of about 7,000, and publishes Wednesday and Saturday.

== History ==
In September 1945, the Paradise Post was founded by Linn J. Potter as a weekly newspaper. The business opened its own printing plant in March 1946. It soon expanded to a twice weekly. In June 1946 was sold to Charles Haines Comfort, an advertisement salesman and columnist at The Chico Record.

Comfort sold the business in February 1947 to Carl Starkey, the night city editor at the Record. Starkey operated the Post for about two years until selling it in March 1949 so he could enroll in college. The new owner was Charles Utt, of San Francisco. Utt ran the paper until his death and then his widow a year later sold it in March 1965 to Lee Kenworthy and Troy L. Maness, who previously ran The Willits News.

In December 1977, a small investment group headed by Post editor James A. Fallbeck acquired the paper from Maness. It was announced a few months later that Lowell Blankfort and Rowland Rebele, owners of The Chula Vista Star-News, were also part of the new ownership group. In 2003, Blankfort and Rebele sold the Post to MediaNews Group. At that time the paper had a circulation of 8,000. In 2023, former owner Rebele died, and a year later was inducted into the California Newspaper Hall of Fame.
