= Steve Riley (American football) =

American football player (1952–2021)

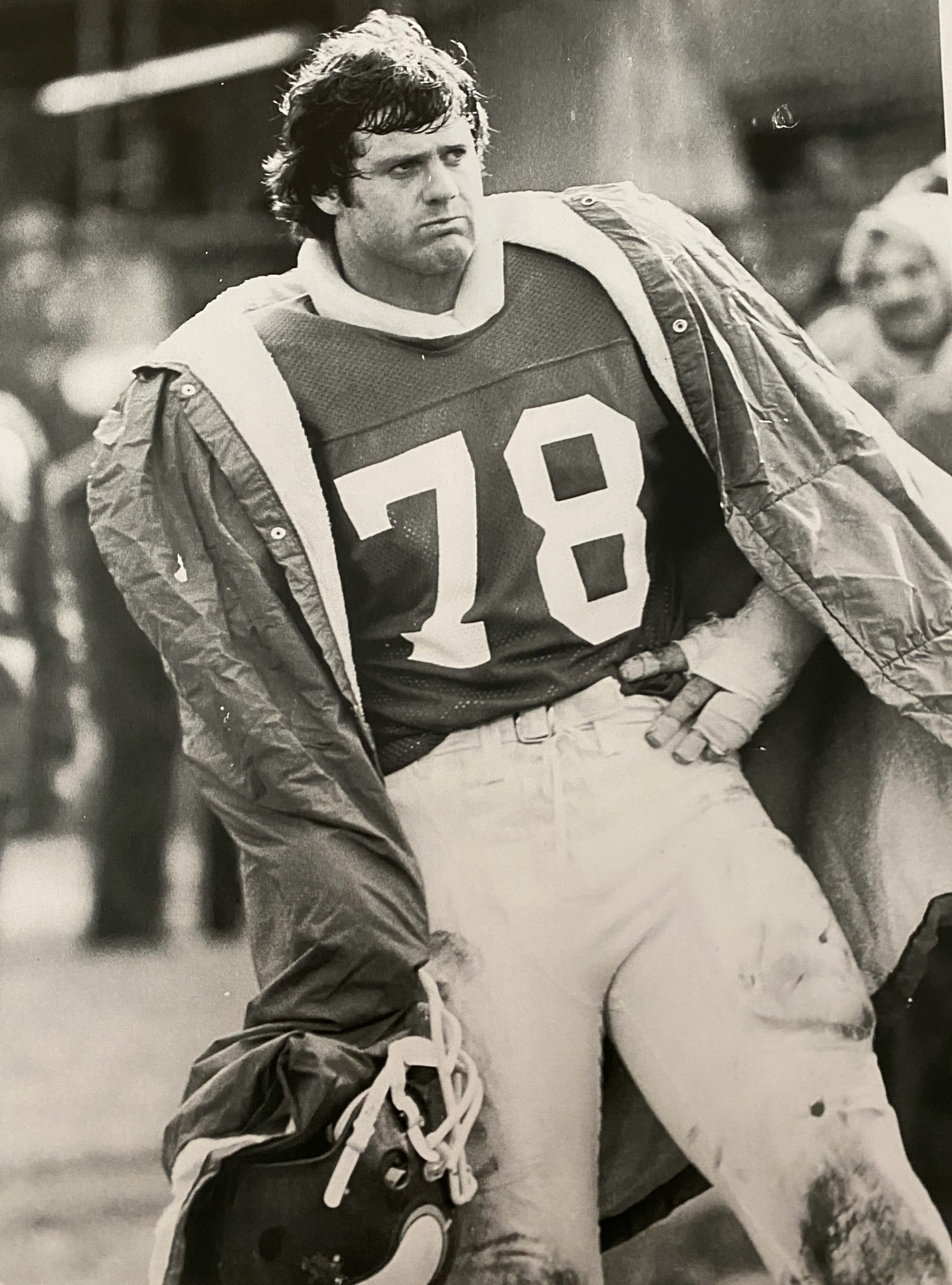

No. 78
- Position: Offensive tackle

Personal information
- Born: November 23, 1952; Chula Vista, California, U.S.
- Died: September 16, 2021 (aged 68)
- Listed height: 6 ft 5 in (1.96 m)
- Listed weight: 258 lb (117 kg)

Career information
- High school: Castle Park (Chula Vista)
- College: USC
- NFL draft: 1974: 1st round, 25th overall pick

Career history
- Minnesota Vikings (1974–1985)

Awards and highlights
- National champion (1972); Ed Block Memorial Courage Award; All-American (1973)

Career NFL statistics
- Games played: 138
- Game started: 128
- Stats at Pro Football Reference

Steven Bruce Riley (November 23, 1952 – September 16, 2021) was an American professional football player who was an offensive tackle for 11 seasons with the Minnesota Vikings of the National Football League (NFL).

== Early life ==
Riley went to Castle Park High School in Chula Vista, California where he was a standout athlete on both the high school varsity basketball and football teams. Castle Park fielded very strong football teams. In his senior year, he was one of the co-captains and helped his team win the San Diego CIF championship. He also made first-team all-CIF and was voted offensive lineman of the year in his conference.

== College career ==
Riley was recruited by Notre Dame, Colorado, New Mexico State, and San Diego State, among others. He played college football at the University of Southern California from 1970 to 1974. Riley moved from guard to tackle following his freshman season. As a junior he started at tackle and was a part of the historic undefeated 1972 USC Trojans team.

He played in two Rose Bowls, one of those being the 1973 Rose Bowl, where the USC Trojans defeated the Ohio State Buckeyes, 42–17, to become the national champions. The 1972 USC Trojans team is regarded by some as the best college football team ever.

== Professional career ==
Riley was picked 25th overall in the first round of the 1974 NFL draft by the Minnesota Vikings. He played 11 seasons, all with the Vikings, from 1974 to 1984. He appeared in 138 games, making 128 starts. He was a part of the 1974 and 1976 NFC championship teams. He played in Super Bowls IX and XI.

Riley took over the starting left tackle position in 1976 and started every game until early 1978 when a neck injury put him on the injured reserve game for 11 games. Riley returned to full-time duty in 1979 and started every game for the next five seasons. Over his career, Riley helped the Vikings reach the playoffs seven times. He started in Super Bowl XI to cap that season and helped Minnesota advance to the 1977 NFC Championship game.

In his last year, Riley started every game despite playing the entire season with his left hand in a cast because of a broken thumb. He started the first six games at left tackle however, in attempt to decrease the amount of contact to his injured hand, he was moved to right tackle for games 7 through 11. Riley went back to left tackle for the remainder of the season as his teammate said the blind side position was too challenging.

== Awards and honors ==
While at USC, he earned All-American first team honors as a 1973 senior as the Trojans returned to the Rose Bowl. He then played in the 1974 College All-Star game.

Riley was voted by his teammates to be the recipient of the Ed Block Courage Award in 1984 largely in part of playing his entire last year with a broken thumb. His games played rank fourth-most in Vikings history among tackles.

== Personal life ==
Riley resided in Southern California after his retirement where he owned a successful commercial property maintenance business in Irvine.

He appeared as an extra in five movies, including "The Bear Bryant Story", "North Dallas Forty", and "Against All Odds".

He was married to his wife, Jan, for 40 years. He had four daughters, Bryn, Erin, Lauren and Kristen, and thirteen grandchildren.
