= Castle Park High School =

Public high school in Chula Vista, California, United States

Coordinates: 32°36′25.5″N 117°3′7.29″W

Location
- 1395 Hilltop Drive; Chula Vista, California 91911

Information
- Type: Public
- Motto: Once a Trojan, Always a Trojan
- Established: September 1963
- School district: Sweetwater Union High School District
- Superintendent: Moisés G. Aguirre
- Principal: Juan I Gonzalez,
- Teaching staff: 92.87 (FTE)
- Enrollment: 1,980 (2023-2024)
- Student to teacher ratio: 21.32
- Campus: Suburban
- Color
- Athletics conference: Metropolitan - Mesa League
- Mascot: Helen of Troy & Tommy Trojan
- Nickname: Trojans
- Website: https://cph.sweetwaterschools.org/

Castle Park High School (CPHS) is a four-year public high school in Chula Vista, California, United States. Established in 1963, it is part of the Sweetwater Union High School District and serves grades 9 through 12. The campus occupies approximately 46 acres and is located six miles north of the Mexico–United States border.

== History ==
Castle Park High School opened in September 1963 to serve the growing suburban population of southwest Chula Vista. Over the decades, the school has undergone multiple renovations, including modernized classrooms in 2006 and ongoing campus improvements under Proposition O funding.

In 2007, the school became the subject of a Title IX lawsuit, Ollier v. Sweetwater Union High School District, filed by female softball players who alleged unequal athletic opportunities and claimed that the school retaliated against them and their coach for raising these concerns. In 2009, the United States District Court for the Southern District of California and U.S. District Judge M. James Lorenz ruled in favor of the plaintiffs, which pays nearly $500,000 in legal fees, finding the district in violation of Title IX. In response, the district invested in improved athletic facilities, including $1.6 million in softball field renovations completed in 2023. 2012, the United States Court of Appeals for the Ninth Circuit upheld a 2012 ruling that the Sweetwater Union High School violated Title IX.

October 3, 2011, CPHS's former principal, Diego Ochoa, and a Vice-principal, stepped down after $21,583 was taken from nine student clubs without advisers' knowledge. In a related matter, Ochoa facilitated over 115 unauthorized grade changes after a credit recovery session, which involved eliminating D's and F's from student transcripts, in violation of district policy. Ochoa was initially in consideration for a promotion to executive director of middle schools; however, he was reassigned to the principal role at Bonita Vista Middle School before his resignation.

== School structure ==
The school serves approximately 2,000 students with around 90 full-time teachers. The academic calendar follows a semester schedule, and students are enrolled in standard, honors, and Advanced Placement (AP) courses.

== Admissions ==
As of December 19, 2014, the school faced student transfers, with over 25% of its students leaving due to concerns about violence and declining academics.

== Curriculum ==
CPHS offers a comprehensive academic program including core subjects and electives. Advanced Placement courses.

Specialized academies include the Science Innovation Academy, providing advanced STEM coursework and career preparation through internships and mentorships. Other programs include AVID, Sports Medicine, Sales and Marketing, the ACE Mentor Program, (sponsored by Turner Construction since 2006) and International Baccalaureate offerings.

== Athletics ==
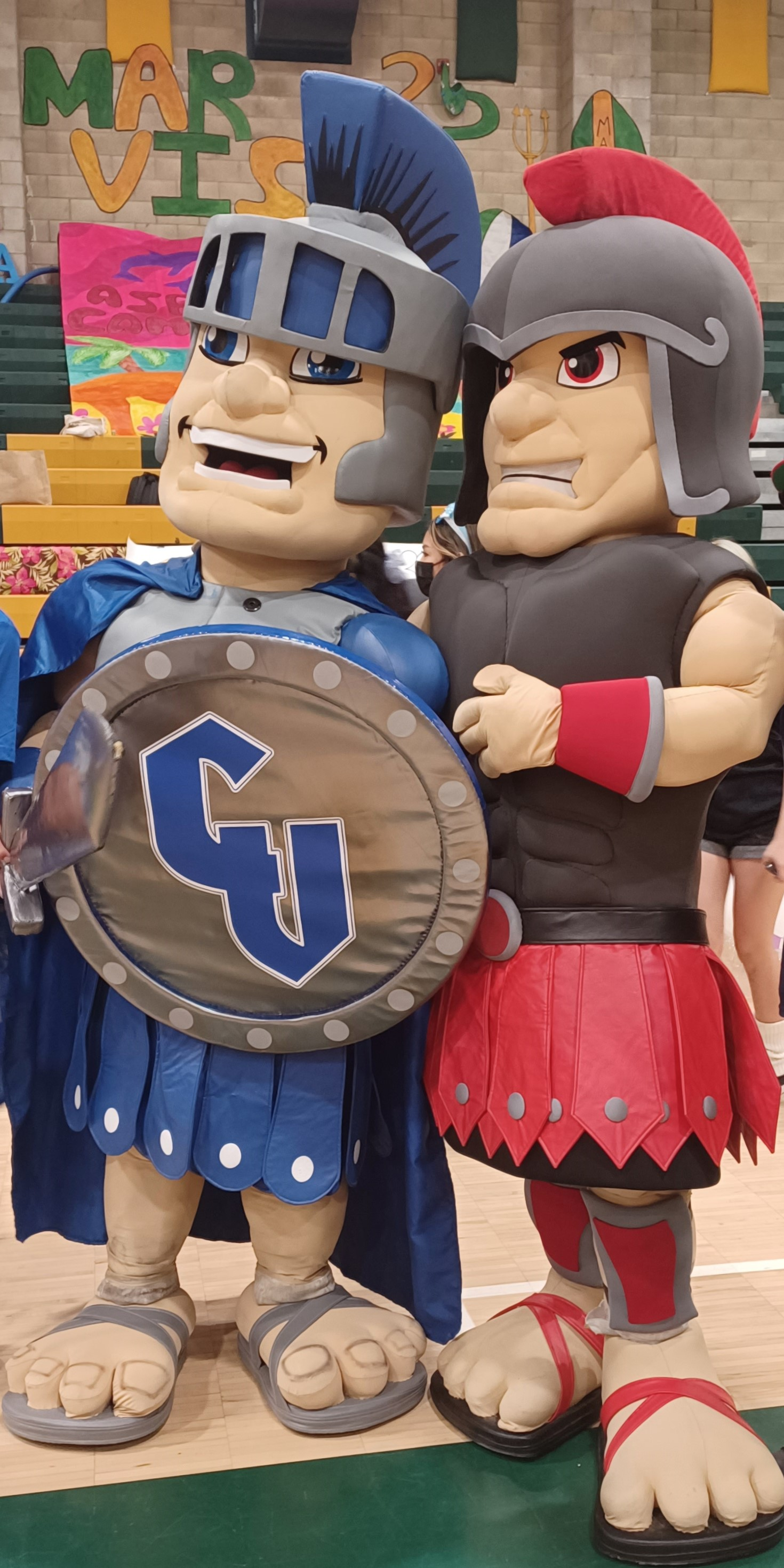
Chula Vista High School mascot is standing next to the CPHS mascot.

CPHS competes in the Metropolitan – Mesa League under the South Bay League of the CIF San Diego Section. Sports offered include:

Fall	Winter	Spring
Boys Water polo; Cross country running; High school football; Girls Field hockey; Girls Flag football; Girls Golf; Girls Tennis; Girls High school volleyball	High school basketball; Competitive cheerleader; Girls Water Polo; Roller Hockey; High school soccer; Scholastic wrestling	Baseball; Beach volleyball; Boys Golf; Boys Tennis; Boys Volleyball; Softball; Swimming (sport); Track and field

In 2024, the district began constructing a $42 million athletic complex that includes a new football stadium and upgraded facilities.

== Campus ==
The campus consists of modernized academic buildings, athletic fields, and performance spaces. Renovations between 2006 and 2011 improved classroom technology, energy efficiency, and landscaping.

== Awards and recognition ==
- September 2009, Congressman Bob Filner presented the school with an American flag.
- The school has been recognized locally for STEM initiatives such as “STEM Goes Red,” organized by the American Heart Association.

== Notable alumni ==
Former CPHS students who became professional athletes competed in the National Football League (NFL), Major League Baseball (MLB), and Major League Soccer (MLS).

- Luq Barcoo (Class of 2016), NFL cornerback who has played for the Jacksonville Jaguars and other teams.
- Michael Farfan, Former MLS midfielder for the Philadelphia Union and D.C. United; twin brother of Gabriel Farfán.
- Gabriel Farfán, Former MLS midfielder for the Philadelphia Union and Chivas USA; twin brother of Michael Farfán.
- John Fox (Class of 1973), Former NFL head coach of the Carolina Panthers, Denver Broncos, and Chicago Bears.
- Benji Gil (Class of 1991), Former MLB infielder for the Texas Rangers and Los Angeles Angels of Anaheim; later manager of the Mexico national baseball team,
- Jerome Haywood, Former Canadian Football League defensive tackle for the Winnipeg Blue Bombers and BC Lions.
- Zeke Moreno (Class of 1996), Former NFL and Canadian Football League linebacker for the San Diego Chargers and Toronto Argonauts.
- Moses Moreno (Class of 1993), Former NFL quarterback for the Chicago Bears and San Diego Chargers.
- Marco Morales (Class of 1980), Former football placekicker who played for the New Orleans Saints.
- Sashel Palacios, Mexican-American softball player
- Steve Riley, Former NFL offensive tackle for the Minnesota Vikings.
- Alex Sanabia (Class of 2006), MLB pitcher who played for the Miami Marlins and Arizona Diamondbacks.
- DeMarco Sampson (Class of 2004), Former NFL wide receiver for the Arizona Cardinals and Buffalo Bills.

== Former principals ==
- Ralph Skiles, Founding principal (1970)
- William "Bill" Padelford, 1971 – 1980
- Russell Vance, 1981 – 1982
- Robert Bane, 1982 – 1990
- Earl F. Wiens, 1994 – 1997
- Maria C. Castilleja, 2002 – 2006
- Earl Weins, 2006 – 2007
- Diego Ochoa, 2008 – 2011
- Virginia Sandoval-Johnson, 2011 – 2012
- Thomas Glover, 2012 – 2015
- Viki Mitrovitch, 2015
- Juan I. Gonzalez, As of 2024

== See also ==
- Education in California
