= Jerome Haywood =

American gridiron football player (born 1978)

Profile
- Position: Defensive tackle

Personal information
- Born: June 7, 1978 (age 48); Los Angeles, California, U.S.
- Listed height: 5 ft 8 in (1.73 m)
- Listed weight: 285 lb (129 kg)

Career information
- High school: Castle Park (Chula Vista, California)
- College: San Diego State

Career history
- 2002–2005: Ottawa Renegades
- 2006: Montreal Alouettes
- 2007–2008: Winnipeg Blue Bombers
- 2009: Montreal Alouettes*
- 2009: Edmonton Eskimos
- * Offseason or practice squad member only

Awards and highlights
- 2× Second-team All-MW (1999, 2000)
- Stats at CFL.ca

Jerome Haywood (born June 7, 1978) is an American former professional Canadian football defensive tackle. He most recently played for the Edmonton Eskimos of the Canadian Football League (CFL). He was signed as an undrafted free agent by the Ottawa Renegades in 2002. He played college football at San Diego State.

Haywood was also a member of the Winnipeg Blue Bombers and Montreal Alouettes.

Haywood attended Castle Park High School in Chula Vista, California, where he starred in football, wrestling, and track and field.
