= John Rojas Jr. =

American historian (1930–2000)

John Rojas Jr. (January 6, 1930 – January 22, 2000) was a Chula Vista, California resident who collected and disseminated information about the history of Chula Vista and its foliage. In 1981 he founded the Chula Vista Historical Society which later merged with the Chula Vista Heritage Museum. He wrote a series of books about Chula Vista.

== Arrival in Chula Vista ==
John Rojas moved to Chula Vista, in 1960 while working as a petty officer in the United States Navy. Chula Vista is a suburb of San Diego California. Rojas began to study the local history. Rojas retired from the navy in 1972 and began his second career as a U.S. Postal Service worker until 1992. He became familiar with the streets of Chula Vista as a postman. He spent his spare time taking pictures of the homes, meeting people and studying the vegetation and trees in the area.

== Founding of Chula Vista Historical Society ==
In 1981, Rojas founded the Chula Vista Historical Society, which later merged with the Chula Vista Heritage Museum.

In 1999, shortly before Rojas' death, the Chula Vista Library Board of Trustees, in recognition of the impact John Rojas had in preserving the history of Chula Vista, presented a resolution creating the John Rojas Local History Room at the Civic Center branch of the library, in order to preserve and makes available materials about the area's historic heritage.

== Publications ==
- "Trees of Chula Vista" ISBN 0-938711-37-7
- "Chula Vista - Early Years" volumes 1-7
- Editor, "Chula Vista Historical Society Bulletin" (1981 to 1991).
- Chula Vista Public Art
- co-author "Historic Chula Vista: Historic Homes and Other Historic Sites"
- co-author "Historic Homes of Chula Vista."
