= Steve Padilla =

American politician (born 1967)

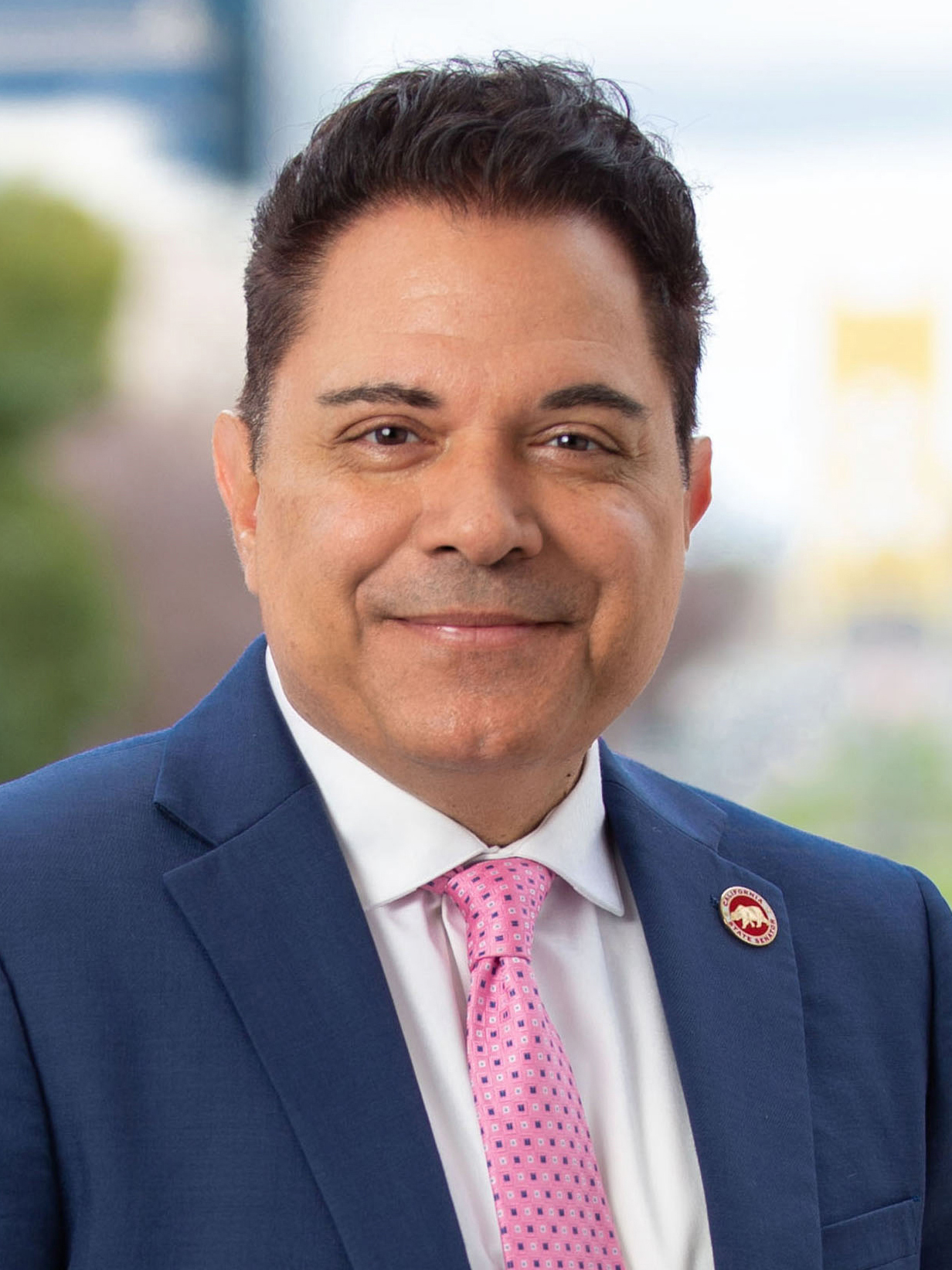
- Official portrait, 2023

Member of the California Senate from the 18th district
- Incumbent
- Assumed office December 5, 2022
- Preceded by: Ben Hueso

38th Mayor of Chula Vista
- In office 2002–2006
- Preceded by: Shirley Horton
- Succeeded by: Cheryl Cox

Member of the Chula Vista City Council
- In office 2016–2022
- Preceded by: Pamela Bensoussan
- Constituency: Seat 3
- In office 1994–2002
- Preceded by: Len Moore
- Succeeded by: John McCann
- Constituency: Seat 2

California Coastal Commission
- Incumbent
- Assumed office 2017
- Appointed by: Anthony Rendon
- In office 2005–2007
- Appointed by: Fabian Núñez

Member of the Board of Port Commissioners
- In office 2009–2011

Personal details
- Born: 1967 (age 58–59) San Diego, California, U.S.
- Party: Democratic

Stephen C. Padilla (born 1967) is an American politician, serving in the California State Senate since 2022. He is not related to United States Senator Alex Padilla. From 1994 to 2002, he served two terms on the Chula Vista City Council. He served as Mayor of Chula Vista (Pop. 240,000) from 2002 to 2006 and as a member of the California Coastal Commission from 2005 to 2007, and again since 2017. He served as a member of the Board of Port Commissioners of the Unified Port of San Diego from 2009 to 2011. In 2016, he ran again and was again elected to the Chula Vista City Council.

== Early life ==
His father was Mexican and his mother was Portuguese.

Shortly after Padilla was born, his father joined the United States Marine Corps, and was deployed to serve in the Vietnam War. Shortly after Padilla's father returned home from this tour of duty, he was killed in an automobile accident. Padilla's mother thereafter purchased a home in Chula Vista to raise her family in. Padilla's mother remarried, giving Padilla and his siblings a stepfather.

Padilla was a Cub Scout and Boy Scout, and later became involved with the Chula Vista Explorer Scouts.

After graduating from Bonita Vista High School, he became the youngest cadet accepted into the Southwestern Police Academy. A police officer for thirteen years, he served as a Detective. He also served as the president of the Chula Vista Police Officers Association.

While a police officer, Padilla returned to school, and received his bachelor's degree in public administration. He was appointed by the City Council to various city boards and commissions, including the Board of Ethics, and Safety Commission.

Padilla worked as a substitute teacher for the Sweetwater Union High School District.

== City council ==
Padilla was elected to the Chula Vista City Council in 1994. He was the first person of Latino descent elected to that office in the city's history. Padilla won re-election in 1998.

Padilla contributed to several changes in city law, including the prohibition of machine sales of tobacco, and increased oversight in mobile home parks. He was also leading figure in city finance reforms, including a move to planning the city's budget on two-year cycles.

== Mayoralty ==
=== Election ===
Padilla was elected the 38th Mayor of Chula Vista on November 5, 2002, defeating fellow City Council member Mary Salas, a colleague and political ally.

Padilla could not have sought another term on the city council in 2002, due to a prohibition on serving more than two terms consecutively.

With both Padilla and Salas running, the election marked the first-time that two incumbent Chula Vista City Council members had run for mayor. The election was also historic in that all three candidates running (Salas, Padilla, and Petra Barajas) were Hispanic, guaranteeing that the city would elect its first Hispanic mayor.

To address the increased traffic congestion stemming from the city rapid growth, Padilla proposed ensuring that developers pay for roads and public services prior to receiving approval for their developments.

Padilla proposed creating a unified school district within city limits.

Padilla was endorsed by two of other four other members of the city council, as well as the Chula Vista Chamber of Commerce and the Chula Vista Police Officers Association. In addition to two incumbent city council members, he also received the endorsement of a council member-elect who had won election in the first-round of the city's elections.

Throughout the campaign, Salas and Padilla criticized each other for accepting campaign contributions from different real estate developers.

A tense race from its inception, in the closing days of the general election, things became particularly hostile as both candidates assailed each other's records. Additionally, Padilla's campaign circulated literature quoting Salas as having used the word "gringos" in a quote to the newspaper El Latino.

Voter turnout was significantly lower in the 2002 election than it had been in the previous two elections.

=== Tenure ===
In collaboration the San Diego Unified Port District, Padilla played a key role in initiating the Bay-front Master Plan, an effort to develop 500 acres (2.0 km^{2}) waterfront to hot public parks, hotels, restaurants, shops and new housing.

While mayor, he launched a Give a Book drive, which saw the donation of more than 100,000 books to underprivileged children in San Diego County.

In 2003, The Star-News executive editor Michael C. Burgess wrote a column interpreted from comments Padilla made about the Mid-Bayfront community during a speech at the San Diego Country Club. Padilla defended his own words, claiming Burgess misunderstood his statement and wrongfully quoted him.

While mayor, he held numerous local, regional, state-wide and national posts during his term as mayor and since including; the board of the San Diego Association of Governments (SANDAG), the League of California Cities and the United States Conference of Mayors. He also chaired the SANDAG Public Safety Committee.

In July 2005, Padilla was appointed by then California Assembly Speaker Fabian Núñez to the California Coastal Commission.

In August, 2005 while speaking at the annual Stonewall Rally of San Diego Pride, a rally on civil rights for gays and lesbians, Padilla acknowledged publicly his sexuality as a gay man. His "coming out" at the time gained him both national attention and political opponents. At that time, Chula Vista became the largest city in the United States with an openly gay mayor. He was the first openly-gay elected city official in Chula Vista's history.

Padilla was featured on the cover of San Diego Metropolitan magazine (July, 2003); named one of the "25 Leading Men in North America" by Instinct magazine (Nov, 2005); and one of "50 People to Watch" by San Diego Magazine (Jan, 2006).

=== Reelection campaign ===
In 2006, Steve Padilla lost his re-election bid to Republican Chula Vista Elementary School Board member Cheryl Cox, the wife of popular former Chula Vista mayor and current county supervisor Greg Cox, 45.76% to Cox's 54.24%.

Cox's campaign against Padilla focused on the drop in City reserves from $40 million to $10 million while Padilla served as Mayor and largely on the fact the city had hired security for Padilla in the wake of anonymous threats.

Padilla stated that his top priorities for a second term would have been continuing to reduce traffic/congestion through smart growth, continuing to improve parks and education, and continuing to make investments in public safety.

Padilla was endorsed by the Chula Vista Chamber of Commerce, Chula Vista Firefighter's Association, Chula Vista Police Officer's Association, and the League of Conservation Voters.

Several scandals, as well as some negative reaction to his coming out, are believed to have contributed to Padilla's defeat. During the campaign, Cox's supporter seized on him for having hired a bodyguard with city funds.

== Post-mayoral career ==
Padilla's tenure on the California Coastal Commission, which he had been appointed to in 2005, ended in 2007.

In early 2011, Chula Vista's city council failed to appoint Padilla to a full 4-year term in his own right in a 3–2 vote, just hours after he was sworn in as vice chairman at the commission's annual luncheon.

In 2014 Padilla sought to re-enter elective office and sought a seat on the Chula Vista City Council. In what became the closest election in city history, his campaign received broad organizational and political support, but lost the bid by only 2 votes out of nearly 39,000 cast. He was defeated by John McCann. McCann was a former Chula Vista City Council member, having previously served from 2002 through 2010. McCann, a Republican, had, in fact, originally succeeded Padilla as the officeholder for seat 2 on the City Council in 2002, and had, as councilman-elect in 2002, endorsed Padilla in the second-round of his first mayoral race.

=== Return to City Council and Coastal Commission ===
After his extraordinarily narrow defeat in the 2014 city council election, Padilla opted to seek a different seat on the Chula Vista City Council in 2016, and was elected. This election was the first time that an openly-gay man had won an election to city office in Chula Vista.

May 31, 2017, Padilla was again appointed to the California Coastal Commission, this time by California Assembly Speaker Anthony Rendon. During part of this tenure, he served as vice-chair, and now serves as chair of the commission.

Padilla was reelected to the Chula Vista City Council in 2020.

== Tenure in the Legislature ==
Padilla has focused in the Legislature on regulating computing use in California. He has introduced several bills that add regulations to the computing hubs that process streaming like Netflix, internet searches, and ChatGPT queries. Some in Silicon Valley voiced concerns, stating that such legislation would hurt California's competitiveness with other states. Labor unions have also expressed that the often high-emotion focus on land uses connected to AI puts jobs for working people at risk.

== Personal life ==
While now openly-gay, Padilla was previously married to a woman.

Padilla came out privately to his family in 1999, and separated from his wife around this time. He divorced his wife and was awarded sole custody of their daughter, Ashleigh. Padilla later came out publicly in 2005, while mayor of Chula Vista.

== Electoral history ==
=== Chula Vista City Council ===
1994 Chula Vista City Council District 2 election
Primary election
Party	Candidate	Votes	%
Nonpartisan	Steve Padilla	9,303	48.1
Nonpartisan	Frank A. Tarantino	5,111	26.4
Nonpartisan	Carmen Sandoval	4,928	25.5
Total votes		19,342	100%
General election
Nonpartisan	Steve Padilla	22,240	67.6
Nonpartisan	Frank A. Tarantino	10,674	32.4
Total votes		32,914	100%

1998 Chula Vista City Council seat 2 election
Candidate	Votes	%
Steve Padilla (incumbent)	12,720	55.86
Jason Paguio	10,016	43.98

2014 Chula Vista City Council seat 1 election
Candidate	Primary		General	
Candidate	Votes	%	Votes	%
John McCann	8,109	37.01	18,448	50
Steve Padilla	7,099	32.40	18,446	50
Scott Vinson	2,960	13.51		
Jason Villar Paguio	2,078	9.48		
Heideh Rivera	1,230	5.61		
Rob Corcilius	400	1.83		

2016 Chula Vista City Council seat 3 election
Candidate	Votes	%
Steve Padilla	14,314	60.30
Greg R. Sandoval	9,424	39.70

2020 Chula Vista City Council seat 3 election
Candidate	Votes	%
Steve Padilla (incumbent)	19,359	56.32
Henry A. Martinez II	15,016	43.68

=== Mayor of Chula Vista ===
2002 Chula Vista mayoral election
Candidate	First round		Runoff	
Candidate	Votes	%	Votes	%
Steve Padilla	10,519	47.3	18,978	53.8
Mary Salas	10,699	48.1	16,286	46.1
Peter E. Barajas	996	4.4	7^{A}	0.0

^A Barajas received 7 votes as a write-in in the runoff

2006 Chula Vista mayoral election
Candidate	Primary election		General election	
Candidate	Votes	%	Votes	%
Cheryl Cox	11,394	40.61	23,124	54.07
Steve Padilla (incumbent)	8,681	30.94	19,509	45.61
Steve Castaneda	6,978	24.87		
Ricardo Macias	527	1.87		
Petra E. Barajas	478	1.70		

=== California State Senate ===
2022 California State Senate 18th district election
Primary election
Party	Candidate	Votes	%
Democratic	Steve Padilla	74,495	61.0
Republican	Alejandro Galicia	47,689	39.0
Total votes		122,184	100.0
General election
Democratic	Steve Padilla	115,103	59.8
Republican	Alejandro Galicia	77,223	40.2
Total votes		192,326	100.0
Democratic hold			
