= Zeke Moreno =

American gridiron football player (born 1978)

No. 57, 50
- Position: Linebacker

Personal information
- Born: October 8, 1978 (age 48); Chula Vista, California, U.S.
- Listed height: 6 ft 2 in (1.88 m)
- Listed weight: 246 lb (112 kg)

Career information
- High school: Castle Park
- College: Southern California
- NFL draft: 2001: 5th round, 139th overall pick

Career history
- 2001–2004: San Diego Chargers
- 2005: Houston Texans*
- 2005: Philadelphia Eagles
- 2005: Miami Dolphins
- 2006: Houston Texans*
- 2007–2008: Hamilton Tiger-Cats
- 2008: Winnipeg Blue Bombers
- 2009: Toronto Argonauts
- 2010: Sacramento Mountain Lions
- * Offseason or practice squad member only

Awards and highlights
- 2× CFL All-Star (2007, 2008); 2× CFL East All-Star (2007, 2008); Second-team All-Pac-10 (2000)
- Stats at Pro Football Reference
- Stats at CFL.ca (archive)

Ezekiel Aaron Moreno (born October 8, 1978) is an American former professional football player who was a linebacker in the National Football League (NFL) and Canadian Football League (CFL).

== Early life ==
Moreno, who is of Mexican descent, attended Castle Park High School in Chula Vista, California, and was a letterman in football and baseball. As a freshman, he was called up to the varsity football team for the playoffs.

As a sophomore in 1994, Moreno helped Castle Park to a 12–2 record and a CIF San Diego Section Division II title with a 24–21 victory over Torrey Pines High School. On defense, he earned first-team All-San Diego Section Division II honors at linebacker, and on offense, he rushed for 272 yards and a touchdown on 52 carries at running back. His head coach, Gil Warren, described him as a "phenom".

As a junior, Moreno suffered a knee injury in Castle Park's Metro Conference championship game victory. The team was later defeated in the CIF San Diego Section Division II semifinals by Escondido High School. Moreno was named the CIF San Diego Section Division II co-Defensive Player of the Year.

As a senior, Moreno led Castle Park to a 13–0 record and a CIF San Diego Section Division II title, recording two interceptions and 21 rushing yards in their 37–10 championship game victory over Carlsbad High School. The team was ranked the no. 1 team in the state in their division. Moreno was named the CIF San Diego Section co-Defensive Player of the Year and was selected to play in the California-Texas Shrine All-Star Game.

== College career ==
Moreno played college football for the University of Southern California's defense from 1998 to 2000. Known as "Zeke And Destroy" by many USC-faithful, Moreno was a force in the middle of the USC defense.

== Professional career ==
Moreno was drafted by the San Diego Chargers in the fifth round (139th pick overall) of the 2001 NFL draft. He played for the Chargers for four years (2001–2004). Moreno was released by the Chargers following the 2004 season and was hampered by injuries while trying to find a home with another team in 2005. He signed with the Hamilton Tiger-Cats of the Canadian Football League in 2007. He was selected as a CFL All-Star in 2007 and 2008.

On September 9, 2008, Moreno was traded to the Winnipeg Blue Bombers.

On February 19, 2009, Moreno was traded to the Toronto Argonauts in exchange for defensive end Riall Johnson.

On February 21, 2010, Moreno was released by the Argonauts.

== NFL career statistics ==
Legend
**Bold**	Career high

Year	Team	Games		Tackles					Interceptions					Fumbles			
Year	Team	GP	GS	Cmb	Solo	Ast	Sck	TFL	Int	Yds	TD	Lng	PD	FF	FR	Yds	TD
2001	SDG	**16**	0	16	14	2	1.0	2	0	0	0	0	0	**1**	0	0	0
2002	SDG	**16**	3	43	36	7	0.0	2	**1**	**8**	0	**8**	1	0	0	0	0
2003	SDG	**16**	**12**	**95**	**78**	**17**	**2.0**	**7**	0	0	0	0	**4**	**1**	**2**	0	0
2004	SDG	9	0	12	9	3	0.0	0	0	0	0	0	0	0	0	0	0
2005	PHI	4	0	5	2	3	0.0	0	0	0	0	0	0	0	0	0	0
Career		61	15	171	139	32	3.0	11	1	8	0	8	5	2	2	0	0

== Records ==
- Most single season tackles by a Hamilton Tiger-Cat (114)
