= The Star-News (Chula Vista, California) =

Community newspaper in Southern California, United States

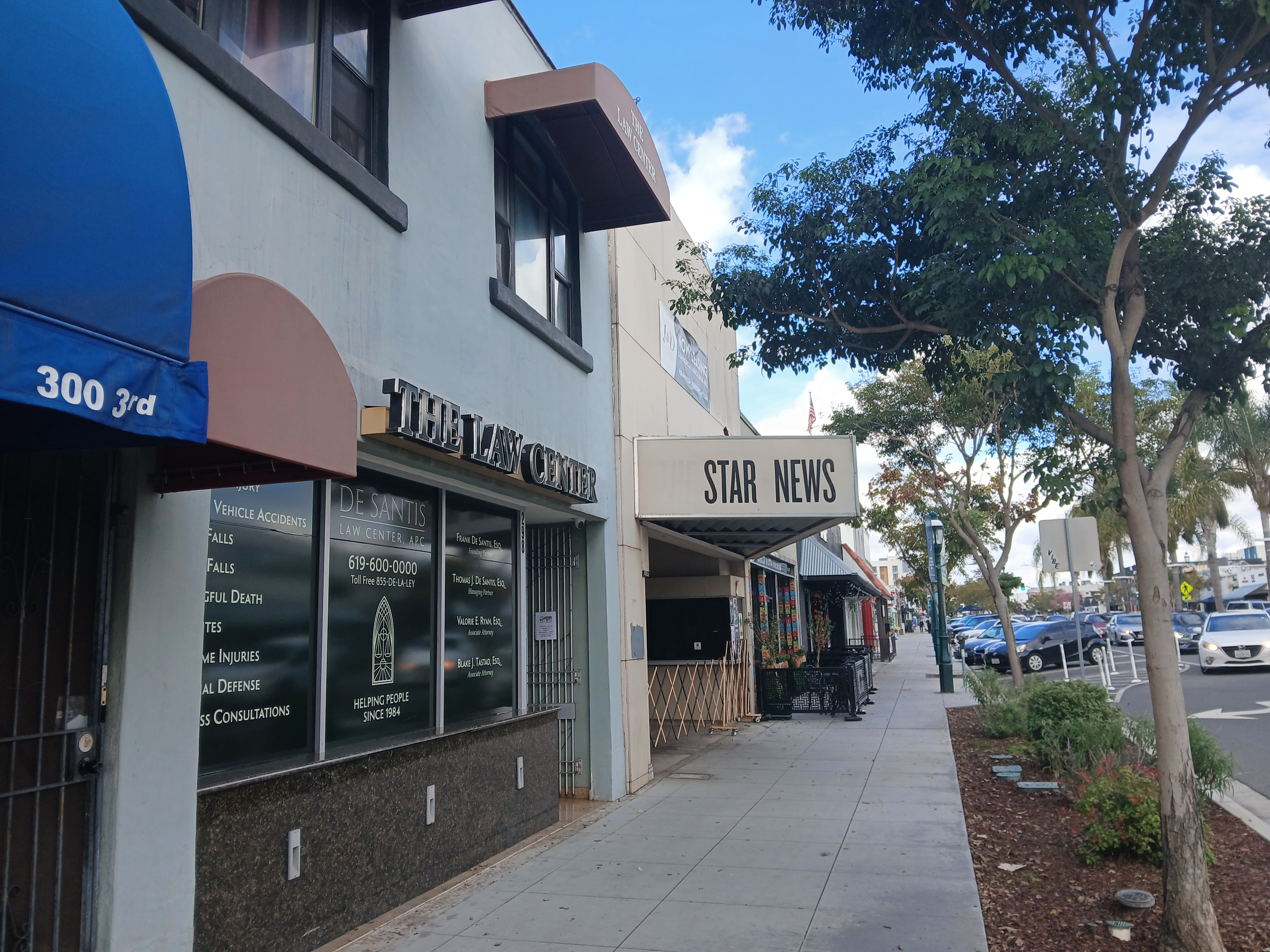
- The Star News building in 2025
- Type: Weekly newspaper
- Format: Tabloid
- Owner(s): Integrity Newspapers, Inc.
- Publisher: Linda Rosas Townson
- Editor: Carlos R. Davalos
- Founded: 1954
- Language: English
- Headquarters: 296 3rd Avenue; Chula Vista, California; United States
- Circulation: 33,500 Weekly
- OCLC number: 45819009
- Website: thestarnews.com

The Star-News is a community newspaper in Southern California, United States. It serves the cities of Chula Vista, Bonita, Eastlake, Otay Ranch and National City. It was founded through the merger of the Chula Vista Star and National City News. The Star-News used to serve the city of Imperial Beach but stopped in 1995. Imperial Beach Eagle & Times would later serve Imperial Beach.

== History ==
In 1882, the National City News was founded. On February 21, 1919, the first edition of the Chula Vista Star was published by Herbert W. Crooks and his wife Leafy R. Crooks. In 1921, C.G. Rowan and Richard L. Cornelius to over the News from the Peoples National Bank and the Arts and Crafts Press of San Diego. Rowan sold out due to poor health after six months to Forest M. Raymond. In 1926, George and Anna G. Allen acquired the News.

Mr. Crooks died in 1927, and Mrs. Crooks sold the Star three years later to Lawrence L. Thompson, of Santa Ana. In 1936, the Allens sold the News to Joseph A. Vurgason, publisher of The National City Reporter. In 1938, Rudolph B. Reinbach and his wife Jennevieve Reinbach, of Three Oaks, Michigan, bought the Star from Thompson. The couple sold it six years later to Walter Ray Coyle, of Rosemead.

In 1950, Vurgason sold the News to Lawrence "Larry" A. Freeman. In 1954, the News and Star merged to form The Star-News, with Freeman and Coyle becoming joint-owners of The Bay Cities Publishing Company. Freeman sold out in 1958 and Coyle operated the paper until his death in 1961. A few months later two couples bought the Star-News, Lowell A. and Alice Blankfort and Rowland K. and Patricia Rebele. Mr. Blankfort previously published the Pacifica Tribune and Mr. Rebele previously published the Coalinga Record.

In 1977, Lowell Blankfort and Rowland Rebele bought the Paradise Post, and sold it in 2003 to MediaNews Group. Lowell Blankfort died in 2015. Rowland Rebele died in 2023 from COVID-19, and a year later was inducted into the California Newspaper Hall of Fame.
