= Mary Salas =

American politician from California (born 1948)

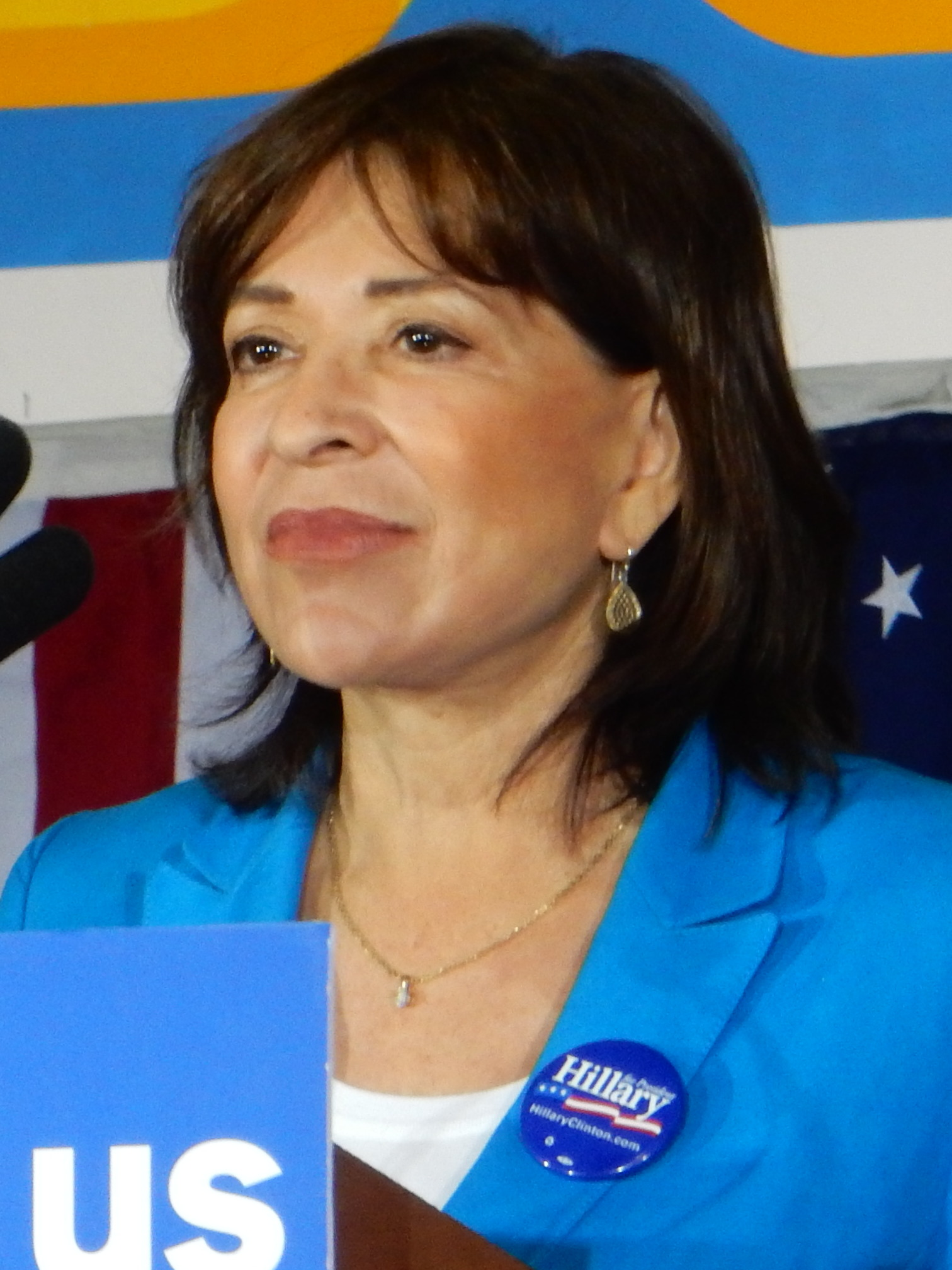
- Salas at a Hillary Clinton rally in 2016

40th Mayor of Chula Vista
- In office December 9, 2014 – December 13, 2022
- Preceded by: Cheryl Cox
- Succeeded by: John McCann

Member of the California State Assembly from the 79th district
- In office December 4, 2006 – November 30, 2010
- Preceded by: Juan Vargas
- Succeeded by: Ben Hueso

Member of Chula Vista City Council from the Fourth District
- In office 2012–2014
- Preceded by: Steve Castañeda
- Succeeded by: Steve Miesen
- In office 1996–2004
- Preceded by: Bob Fox
- Succeeded by: Steve Castañeda

Personal details
- Born: March 17, 1948 (age 78) Chula Vista, California
- Party: Democratic
- Children: 2
- Education: San Diego State University; Southwestern College
- Occupation: Social worker

Mary Casillas Salas (born March 17, 1948) is an American politician who served as the 40th mayor of Chula Vista, California from 2014 to 2022. A member of the Democratic Party, she previously served as a member of the Chula Vista City Council from 2012 to 2014 and as a member of the California State Assembly from 2006 to 2010, representing the 79th Assembly District. She was an unsuccessful candidate for California's 40th senatorial district in 2010, losing narrowly to fellow Democrat Juan Vargas.

== Early life and education ==
Salas' father, is one of 9 children of Felix and Urbana Casillas, who once lived in the La Punta adobe, after moving to the United States, through El Paso, from Mexico. Salas was born in 1948 in Chula Vista.

Salas earned a Bachelor of Arts degree in social work in San Diego State University. While in college, she became involved with MANA de San Diego, a women's organization that mentors young Latinas, which led her into city politics.

== Career ==
=== Initial City Council tenure ===
In 1996, Salas was elected as a member of city council in Chula Vista. Salas became the first Latina elected to the Chula Vista City Council, and second person of Latino descent on the City Council, after Steve Padilla. In 2000, as an incumbent, Salas was re-elected as a member of Chula Vista City Council. As a councilwoman, she chaired the University Working Group to establish a higher education center in the region and co-chaired the Blue Ribbon Committee for the "San Diego County Preschool for All." She gained a reputation as a member who was willing to speak her mind.

Salas led many efforts to support historic preservation. This included leading an effort for the city to adopt the Mills Act, giving owners of historic houses tax breaks for property repair.

In 2001, Salas was early to call for San Diego Unified Port District Board member David Malcolm to resign over his consulting contract with Duke Energy, which he would ultimately do in early 2002.

Salas was term-limited out of the city council in 2004, being barred from serving more than two terms consecutively.

==== 2002 mayoral campaign ====
In 2002, Salas ran in the open-race for mayor against fellow city councilmember and political ally Steve Padilla, but lost. Salas had placed a narrow first in the first-round of the election, but had failed to receive a full majority of the vote, thus triggering a runoff. She lost the runoff.

The election was an open-race, as incumbent Shirley Horton was term-limited.

With both Salas and Padilla running, the election marked the first-time that two incumbent Chula Vista City Council members had run for mayor. The election was also historic in that all three candidates running (Salas, Padilla, and Petra Barajas) were Hispanic, guaranteeing that the city would elect its first Hispanic mayor.

Salas collected some big-name endorsements. These included Bob Filner, as well organizations such as the AFSCME, Chula Vista Employees Association, and United Domestic Workers. She was also endorsed ahead of the primary by the editorial board of the La Presna San Diego newspaper.

The race between Salas and Padilla was regarded as closely contested.

Salas pledged to bring a broader vision to enhancing the city's regional economic importance. She also noted community concerns, such as illegal evictions and areas of the city being in need of sidewalks.

Salas proposed fast-tracking roadway projects to alleviate traffic congestion stemming from the city's rapid growth.

With much political overlap between Salas and Padilla, the race was seen as being debated on which candidate had the superior experience to lead the city.

Throughout the campaign, Salas and Padilla criticized each other for accepting campaign contributions from different real estate developers.

A tense race from its inception, in the closing days of the general election, things became particularly hostile as both candidates assailed each other's records. Additionally, Padilla's campaign circulated literature quoting Salas as having used the derisive term "gringos" in a quote to the newspaper El Latino.

Voter turnout was significantly lower in the 2002 election than it had been in the previous two elections.

=== Post-city council membership of boards ===
Salas was a member of the South Bay Irrigation District from 2004 through 2006.

Salas joined the Sweetwater Authority Board of Directors in 2006.

=== California State Assembly ===
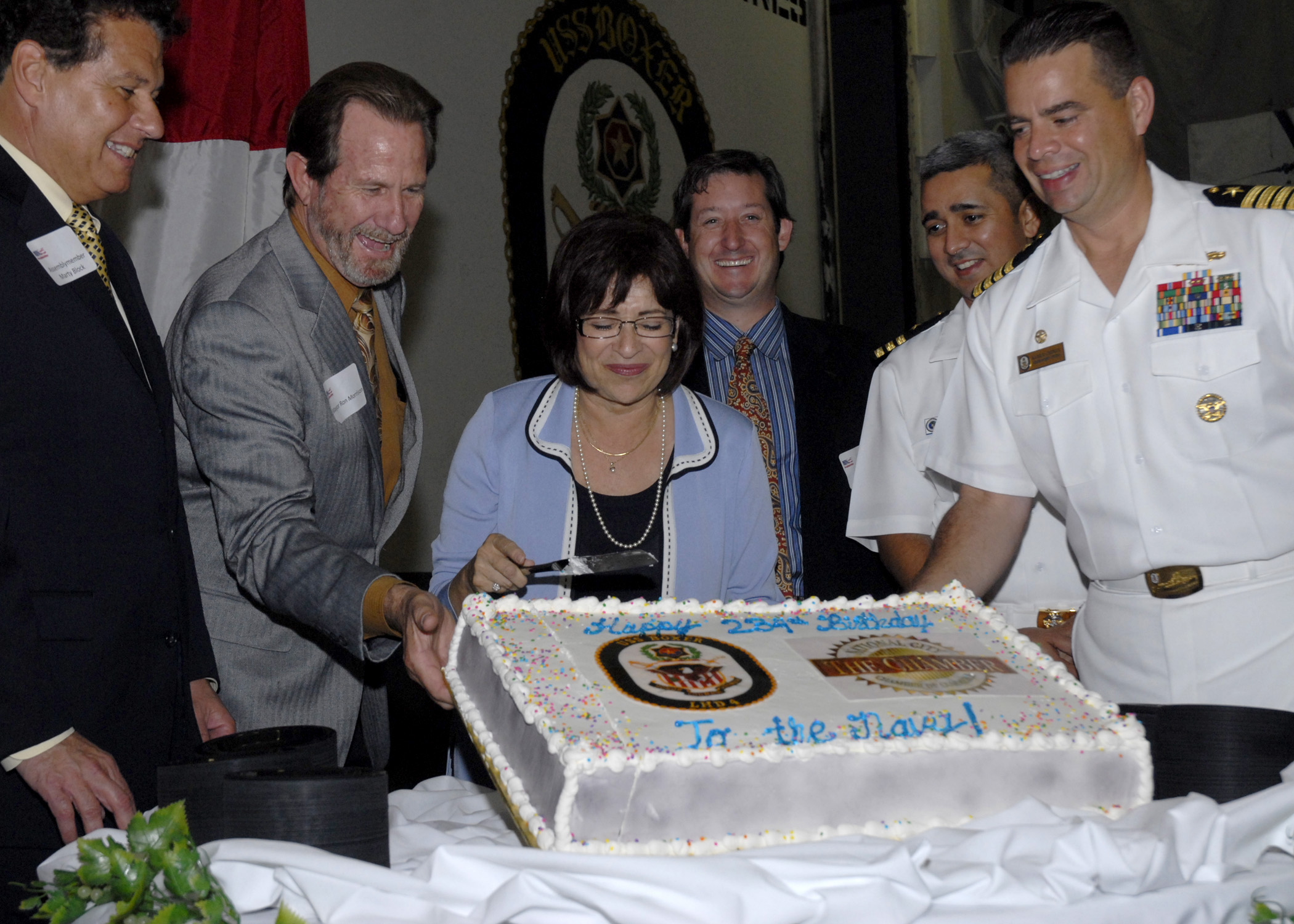
Mary Salas and National City Mayor Ron Morrison celebrating the United States Navy's 234th birthday in 2009

Salas was elected to the California State Assembly in 2006, defeating Jean Roesch. She represented the 79th district which includes the communities of National City, Coronado, Imperial Beach and parts of Chula Vista and San Diego. Salas was appointed Chair of the Committee on Veterans Affairs in 2007. She also served on the following standing committees: Jobs, Economic Development, and the Economy; Water, Parks and Wildlife; and the Committee on Health. She was re-elected in 2008. In 2010 she campaigned for California State Senate but lost narrowly to Juan Vargas.

=== Return to City Council ===
In 2012 Salas ran again for election to the Chula Vista City Council, representing District 4. In the November runoff election she defeated Linda Wagner, 57.6% to 42.3%.

=== Mayoralty ===
Mary Salas was sworn in as the first Latina Mayor of Chula Vista, California on December 9, 2014. She was sworn in for a second term in December 2018.

==== Election campaigns ====
===== 2014 =====
Having run unsuccessfully in 2002, Salas made her second attempt at the mayoralty of Chula Vista in the 2014 election. This was the first mayoral election to take place in Chula Vista following the passage of a 2012 proposition which amended the city charter to require mandatory candidate runoffs, meaning that, even if a candidate obtains more than 50% of the vote in the primary, a second round of the election would be held between the top-two finishers. Municipal elections in California are officially non-partisan.

The election was an open-race, since incumbent mayor Cheryl Cox was term-limited. There were two other candidates running. One was Jerry Rindone, who had been a member of the Chula Vista City Council from 1990 through 1998 and again from 2000 through 2008, as well as the vice chairman of Metropolitan Transit System, a member of the San Diego County Board of Education from 2008 through 2012, and president of Chula Vista Chamber of Commerce in 2013. The other was Pamela Bensoussan, who had been a member of the Chula Vista City Council since 2008.

In the first round, Salas placed first and Rindone second, thus the two advanced to the second round.

In the second round, Salas carried the endorsements of the San Diego County Democratic Party, Chula Vista Democratic Club, Eastlake-Bonita Democratic Club, Chula Vista Police Officers Association, and Chula Vista Firefighters Local 2180. Rindone carried the endorsements of the San Diego County Republican Party, Chula Vista Chamber of Commerce, Chula Vista Bonita Republican Women Federated, Latino American Political Association of San Diego, and U-T San Diego.

Salas won the November 4 general election.

===== 2018 =====
Salas ran for reelection in 2018.

Salas' pledge for a second term as mayor was that she would work to bring a four-year university to Chula Vista, complete the multi-billion dollar Bayfront development, address infrastructure concerns, and hire more police officers and firefighters.

Salas had three opponents. One was Hector Gastelum, a Republican serving as a member of the Otay Water District and working as a realtor with the firm Big Block Realty. The other two were Chula Vista Parks Supervisor Daniel Schreck and educator Arthur Kende.

Schreck, who had worked in Chula Vista's government for twenty-five years and was currently the Chula Vista Parks Supervisor, was the only challenger with municipal government experience. He positioned himself as a government insider but a political outsider. Arthur Kende, who had taught at San Diego Jobs Corps for the previous eight years, was the youngest candidate, at age 36, and the only one without government experience. Kende campaigned as a candidate who wanted cut through bureaucratic "red tape".

Castelum campaigned as a conservative opposed to "big government" and "political correctness", and an enemy of the organization Planned Parenthood. Gastelum also campaigned against the city's status as a sanctuary city. Anti-Muslim tweets by Gastelum from 2017, which he refused to apologize for, attracted attention. The tweet in question read, "Let's pressure our legislature to create a list of so-called #MuslimBan to prevent #SubHuman #Scum from #USA to #MAGA". Of those challenging Salas, Gastelum had the strongest name recognition, largely due to the controversy that this 2017 tweet had generated.

An issue in the race was the city's growing pension costs.

Salas' opponents all criticized the economic problems of the city. Chula Vista generated the second-lowest per capita tax revenues in San Diego County due to population growth having occurred faster than revenue growth. Consequentially, city services had not kept in pace with demand.

Salas went into the first-round of the election having vastly out-fundraised her opponents.

Having, respectively, placed first and second in the first-round of the election, held June 5, Salas and Castelum advanced to the second round. Salas had received 62.48% of the first-round vote and Gastelum had received 16.98%. Both Schreck and Kende were eliminated.

In the second-round of the election, Salas bore the endorsement of the San Diego County Democratic Party, as well as the endorsement of San Diego Democrats for Equality.

Salas won the second-round of the election by a landslide, receiving 71.86% of the vote to Gastelum's 28.14%.

== Personal life ==
Salas has two adult children. Salas resides in Chula Vista, California.

== Electoral history ==
=== City council ===
1996 Chula Vista City Council seat 4 election
Candidate	First round		Runoff	
Candidate	Votes	%	Votes	%
Mary Salas	6,698	29.4	22,106	54.9
Jim Cartmill	6,501	28.5	18,135	45.1
Dean Archibald	2,304	15.9		
Scot William Davenport	2,304	10.1		
Michelle Castognola	1,894	8.3		
Archie McAllister	1,777	7.8		

2000 Chula Vista City Council seat 4 election
Candidate	Votes	%
Mary Salas (incumbent)	16,517	66.17
Richard Gonzales	8,443	33.83

2012 Chula Vista City Council seat 4 election
Candidate	First round		Runoff	
Candidate	Votes	%	Votes	%
Mary Salas	13,205	48.85	40,426	50.15
Linda Wagner	7,192	26.61	28,250	35.05
London Meservy	6,566	24.29		

=== State Assembly ===
2006

2006 California's 79th Assembly district Democratic primary
Party	Candidate	Votes	%
Democratic	Mary Salas	14,992	63.2
Democratic	Greg R. Sandoval	6,388	26.9
Democratic	Jesse Albritten	2,367	9.9

2006 California's 79th Assembly district election
Party	Candidate	Votes	%
Democratic	Mary Salas	39,437	62.8
Republican	Jean Roesch	23,395	37.2

2008

2008 California's 79th Assembly district Democratic primary
Party	Candidate	Votes	%
Democratic	Mary Salas (incumbent)	17,865	86.8
Democratic	Jesse Albritten	2,718	13.2

2008 California's 79th Assembly district election
Party	Candidate	Votes	%
Democratic	Mary Salas (incumbent)	74,051	69.50
Republican	Derrick W. Roach	32,526	30.50

=== State Senate ===
2010 California's 40th State Senate district Democratic primary
Party	Candidate	Votes	%
Democratic	Juan Vargas	24,282	50.1
Democratic	Mary Salas	24,260	49.9

=== Mayor ===
2002 Chula Vista mayoral election
Candidate	First round		Runoff	
Candidate	Votes	%	Votes	%
Steve Padilla	10,519	47.3	18,978	53.8
Mary Salas	10,699	48.1	16,286	46.1
Peter E. Barajas	996	4.4	7^{A}	0.0

^A Barajas received 7 votes as a write-in in the runoff

2014 Chula Vista mayoral election
Candidate	Primary election		General election	
Candidate	Votes	%	Votes	%
Mary Salas	9,808	44.07	19,995	52.87
Jerry R. Rindone	8,638	38.82	17,827	47.13
Pamela Bensoussan	3,732	16.78		

2018 Chula Vista mayoral election
Candidate	Primary election		General election	
Candidate	Votes	%	Votes	%
Mary Salas (incumbent)	24,572	62.48	54,062	71.86
Hector Gastelum	6,676	16.98	21,175	28.14
Daniel Schreck	4,408	11.21		
Arthur Kende	3,547	9.02		

Political offices
Preceded by Cheryl Cox	Mayor of Chula Vista; December 9, 2014 – present	Succeeded by Incumbent
Preceded by Steve Castaneda	Chula Vista City Councilmember "District 4"; 2012–2014	Succeeded by Steve Miesen
Preceded by Bob Fox	Chula Vista City Councilmember "District 4"; 1996–2004	Succeeded by Steve Castañeda
California Assembly
Preceded by Juan Vargas	California State Assemblywoman; 79th District; December 4, 2006 – November 30, 2010	Succeeded by Ben Hueso
