= Cheryl Cox =

American mayor (born 1949)

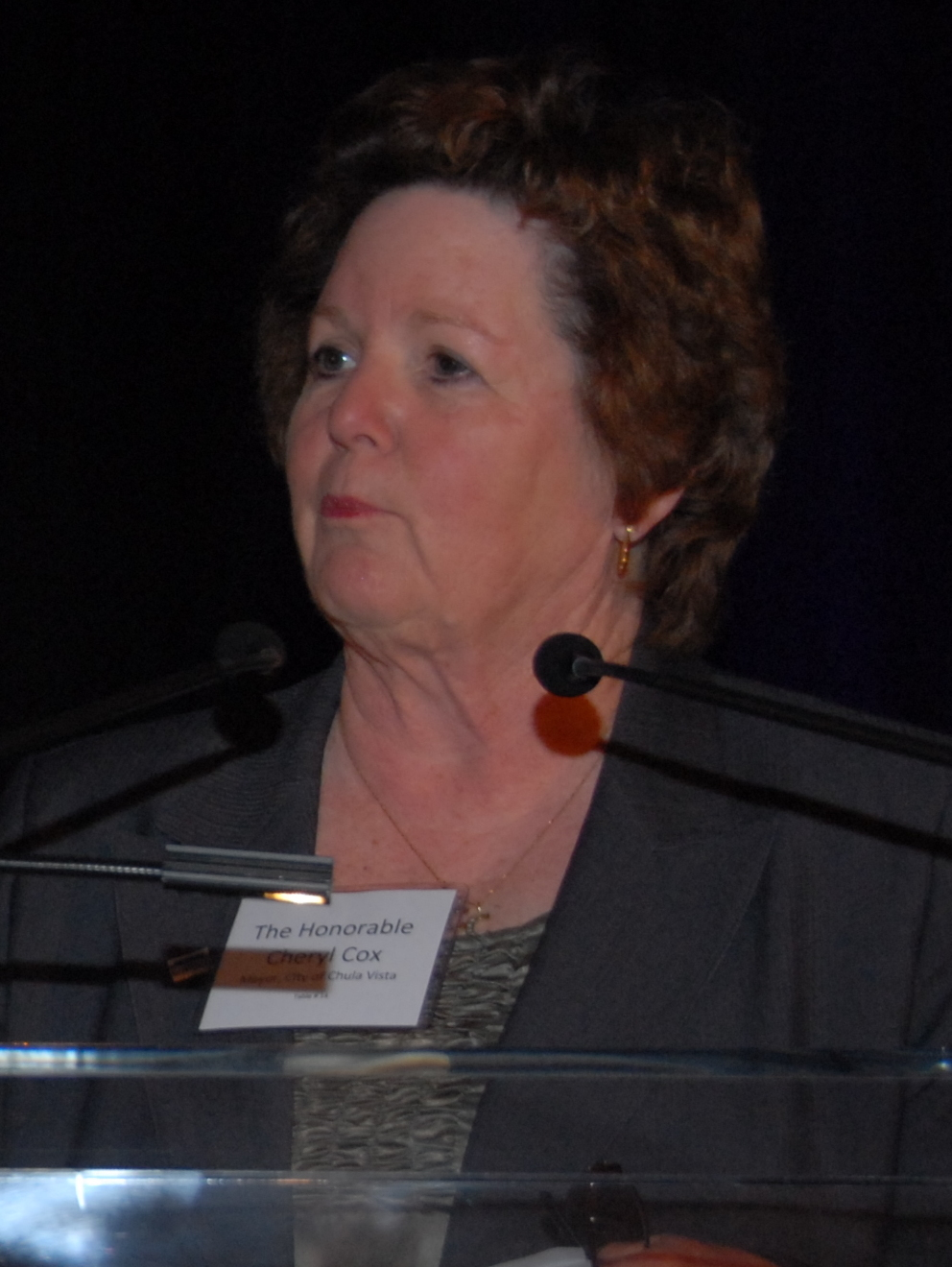

39th Mayor of Chula Vista
- In office 2006–2014
- Preceded by: Steve Padilla
- Succeeded by: Mary Salas

Personal details
- Born: February 23, 1949 (age 77)
- Party: Republican
- Spouse: Greg Cox

Cheryl Cox (born February 23, 1949) is an American politician and former educator, who served as the Republican mayor of Chula Vista, California, from 2006 to 2014. A former elementary school teacher, she ran for mayor in November 2006 against the incumbent mayor Steve Padilla and Councilmember Steve Castaneda, defeating both, and was re-elected in June 2010 by defeating Castaneda with more than 50% of the vote in the Primary Election.

== Biography ==
=== Early life and education ===
Cox was born Cheryl Willet. She was born in Florida. She is the daughter of retired United States Navy Officer, John Willett. Cox moved to Virginia, before later moving to San Diego County, California.

Cox, and her husband of 30 years, San Diego County Supervisor and former Chula Vista Mayor Greg Cox, had two daughters, Elizabeth and Emmie. Both Cheryl and her two daughters graduated from Chula Vista's Hilltop High School.

Cox received a bachelor's degree from the University of San Diego, a master's degree in political science from San Diego State University and a doctorate in education from the University of Southern California.

=== Career ===
She worked for 30 years as a teacher, principal, and administrator in the Chula Vista Elementary School District; she was also an assistant professor at National University, before being elected to the Chula Vista Elementary School District Board of Trustees in 2000.

Cox served as a member of the City of Chula Vista Charter Review Commission, Nature Center Board of Trustees and the President of the Sharp Chula Vista Medical Center Board of Directors. Her membership of the Chula Vista Charter Review Commission began in 2002. Her membership of the Chula Vista Medical Center Board of Directors lasted nine years, and included a stint as its president.

Cox also served on Chula Vista's Ad Hoc Committee for Campaign Finance Reform, which made revisions to clarifications to the city's campaign finance regulations which were adopted by its city council. From 2003 through 2005, Cox was an inaugural member of an independent ten-member Urban Development Committee which created a recommended plan of how the city could productively use redevelopment to its advantage, submitting its plan to the Chula Vista City Council in 2005.

=== Mayoralty ===
==== Election ====
Cox, a Republican, was elected the 39th mayor of Chula Vista, the second largest city in San Diego County, in November 2006 in a runoff vote against incumbent mayor Steve Padilla. In the June 2006 primary election, she received 40.5% of the vote, against 30.8% for incumbent mayor Steve Padilla, and 24.8% for Councilmember Steve Castaneda. With no candidate securing a majority of the vote, the top two finishers, Cox and Padilla, advanced to a runoff, which Cox won.

In the election, Cox received endorsements from the Deputy Sheriffs' Association of San Diego County, Lincoln Club of San Diego, and San Diego County Apartment Association. In addition to these organizations she was endorsed by several Republican politicians, including her husband Greg Cox, Shirley Horton, Darrell Issa, George Plescia, Mark Wyland.

==== Tenure ====
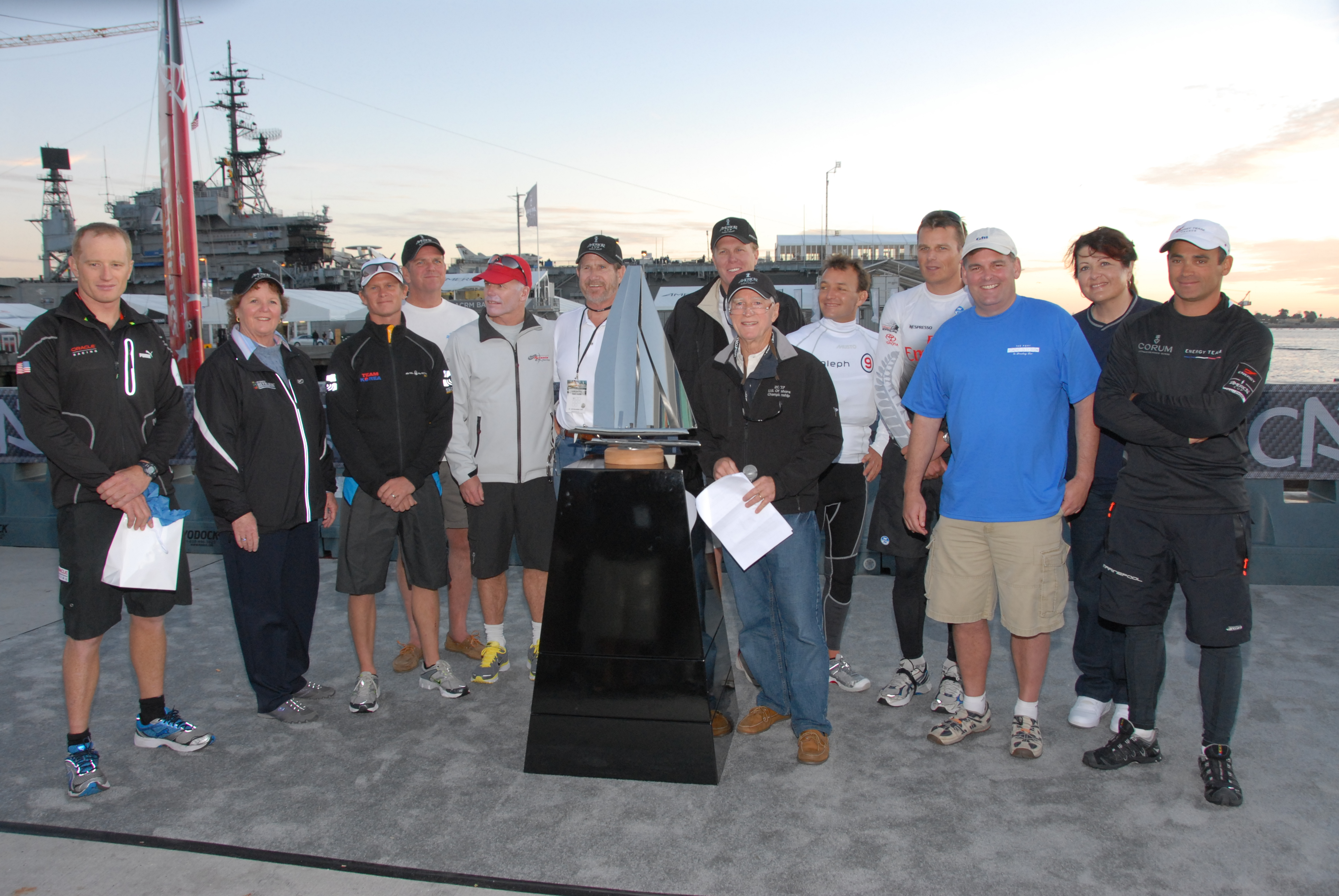
Mayor Cox (second left) with Oracle Team USA and other elected officials

While mayor, Cox was a member of the Mayors Against Illegal Guns Coalition, an organization formed in 2006 and co-chaired by New York City mayor Michael Bloomberg and Boston mayor Thomas Menino.

During Cox's first term, major setbacks were dealt to the city's important waterfront redevelopment plan.

Also during Cox's first term, there were negotiations with the San Diego Chargers, which was considering building a stadium i the city. However, leadership of the team began publicly feuding with Cox, which openly made it clear that they preferred to negotiate with city councilmember John McCann over Cox, with the team's Special Counsel Mark Fabiani going as far as to deride Cox as a "weak mayor in a weak-mayor city".

The city experienced financial difficulties during Cox's tenure, teetering on the brink of bankruptcy. A 1% citywide tax increase she had supported to help resolve the city's finances was heavily defeated by voters in May 2009, receiving 32.5% support and 67.5% opposition at the special election held on the measure.

Cox had success in raising the city's credit rating.

Despite the troubles of her first term, Cox, won re-election for Mayor in the June 2010 Primary election in a three-person race by winning 56.3% of the vote, her opponent Councilmember Steve Castaneda garnered 29.6% and Jorge Dominguez received 13.6% of the vote.

== San Diego D.A. investigations of Cox's political rivals ==
In April 2007, the Public Integrity Unit of San Diego District Attorney Bonnie Dumanis began prosecuting political opponents of Cheryl Cox. Patrick O'Toole, who had previously been appointed as US Attorney for San Diego by Attorney General John Ashcroft, headed the unit. O'Toole prosecuted a staffer for mayor Steven Padilla who had taken two hours off work in an effort to get a photograph of Cheryl Cox with her disgraced family friend David Malcolm at a twilight yacht party fundraiser for Cox. The staffer was charged with five felony counts of perjury for telling a grand jury that he filled out his leave slip from work before rather than after he took off from his job at the City of Chula Vista. He pleaded guilty to lesser charges as part of a plea deal.

The now-dormant unit ended its active phase with a second and final prosecution, that of Steve Castaneda, who had run against Cheryl Cox for mayor. Castaneda was prosecuted for allegedly lying about whether he planned to buy a condo, even though he never bought the condo in question. According to the San Diego Union Tribune, "Castaneda was a tenant at the complex and was accused of seeking favors, such as free rent, from Sunbow owner Ash Israni, according to the 1,200-page grand jury transcript. The investigation found that Castaneda paid his rent and didn't ask for special treatment. O'Toole told the grand jury the perjury charges are warranted because Castaneda should be held accountable for 'lying about the facts'; even if no crime was uncovered...Castaneda has been vocal about O'Toole's investigations, saying they are politically motivated. He contended that Dumanis conspired with Chula Vista Mayor Cheryl Cox, his political rival in the 2006 mayoral primary."

In April 2014, questions were raised about political interference by San Diego County District Attorney Bonnie Dumanis in that election. In late 2005 Steve Padilla received a phone call from Dumanis asking him to support her employee Jesse Navarro for city councilmember. Mr. Padilla did not comply. The phone call raises questions about possible political motivations for the ensuing prosecutions of a staffer of Steve Padilla and of Steve Castaneda.

== Awards ==
- Chula Vista Chamber of Commerce's Leadership and Involvement Award (2007)
- Hilltop High School Hall of Fame inductee (2007)
- San Diego Urban Corps' Kate Session Environmental Award (2007)
- Building Owners and Managers Association Public Official of the Year (2008)
- California Women's Leadership Association Trailblazer Award (2008)
- Chula Vista Chamber of Commerce Presidential Award (2009)

== Electoral history ==
2006 Chula Vista mayoral election
Candidate	Primary election		General election	
Candidate	Votes	%	Votes	%
Cheryl Cox	11,394	40.61	23,124	54.07
Steve Padilla (incumbent)	8,681	30.94	19,509	45.61
Steve Castaneda	6,978	24.87		
Ricardo Macias	527	1.87		
Petra E. Barajas	478	1.70		

2010 Chula Vista mayoral election
Candidate	Votes	%
Cheryl Cox (incumbent)	18,771	56.31
Steve Castaneda	9,886	29.66
Jorge Dominguez	4,561	13.68

== Other sources ==
- Voter Information for Cheryl Cox www.smartvoter.org accessed 2006-12-30
- Mayor Cheryl Cox City of Chula Vista accessed 2006-12-30
- County official's wife aims to serve SignOnSanDiego.com by Shannon McMahon The San Diego Union-Tribune Staff Writer, February 22, 2006, accessed 2006-12-30
- Padilla criticizes Cox's record on test scores, finances, secrecy By Tanya Mannes UNION-TRIBUNE STAFF WRITER October 13, 2006 www.signonsandiego accessed 2007-1-6
- New authority figure Ex-teacher wants to bring a 'sense of order' to council By Tanya Mannes UNION-TRIBUNE STAFF WRITER October 19, 2006 www.signonsandiego accessed 2007-1-5
- Steve Padilla is the Best Choice to Lead Chula Vista into the Future November 3, 2006 Editorial (Daniel Muñoz, editor) La Prensa San Diego laprensa-sandiego.org accessed 2007-1-6
- SHOCKED, SHOCKED TO FIND OUT THAT POLITICS TOOK PLACE IN THAT GOVERNMENT OFFICE By Bill Cavala April 3, 2007 California Progress Report www.californiaprogressreport.com accessed 2007-4-18
