= North County (San Diego area) =

Coordinates: 33°2′48″N 117°17′9″W

- Region of the San Diego Metro Area
- Oceanside Pier in North County

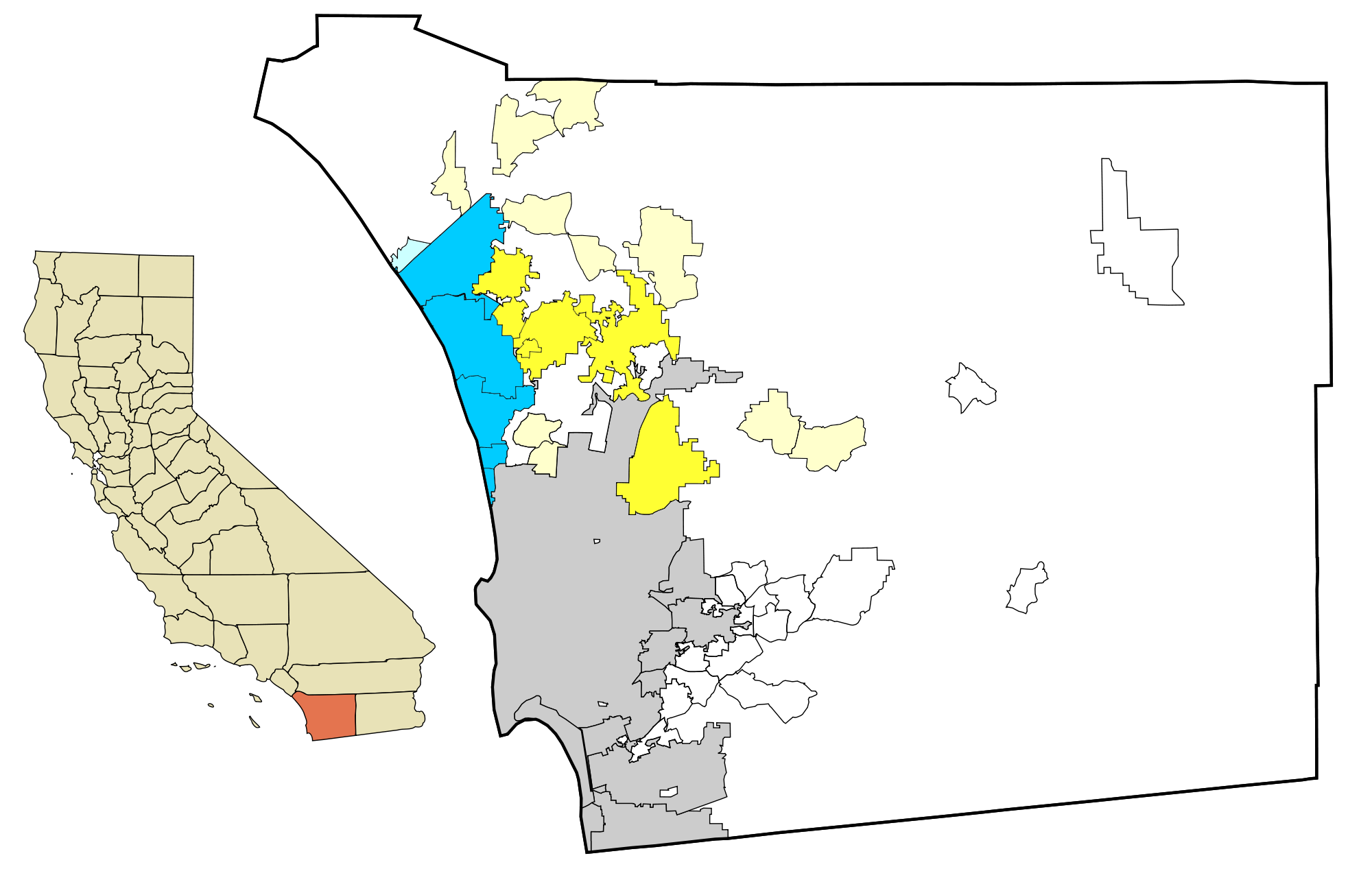
- North County cities (blue and yellow) and census-designated places (pale blue and cream). Certain neighborhoods in northern San Diego may also be considered part of North County.
- Country: United States
- State: California
- County: San Diego

Population
  - Total: 869,322

North County is a region in the northern area of San Diego County, California. It is the second-most populous region in the county (after San Diego), with an estimated population of 869,322. North County is well known for its sprawl and its affluence, especially in Encinitas, Carlsbad, San Elijo Hills, Del Mar, Rancho Santa Fe, Poway and Solana Beach, where house prices range, on average, above $1,000,000. Cities along the 78 freeway (Oceanside, Vista, San Marcos and Escondido) have more mixed incomes.

Beach culture is prominent in the area, and many of the region's beaches and lagoons are protected areas to help ensure the environment remains pristine, though there has been pressure from commercial entities to develop some of these areas.

== History ==
The name dates to at least the 1970s, when many of the communities in the area were yet to become incorporated cities and local community decisions were made 40 miles (64 km) away at the county seat. The North County section of San Diego County has historically been the most expensive region of San Diego, with such affluent neighborhoods as Aviara, Cardiff-by-the-Sea, Carlsbad, Carmel Valley, Del Mar, Encinitas, La Costa, Leucadia, Olivenhain, Rancho Santa Fe, San Elijo Hills, and Solana Beach.

In modern times, North County continues to grow as a highly influential region of Greater San Diego. The top 25 employers in San Diego County are closer to the North County city of Carlsbad than San Diego proper.

== Geography ==
North County is commonly divided into coastal and inland regions. The coastal region is almost entirely incorporated, consisting of the cities of Oceanside, Carlsbad, Encinitas, Solana Beach and Del Mar, along with Camp Pendleton South. The inland region includes the cities of Escondido, Vista, San Marcos, as well as numerous unincorporated areas. Semi-rural inland communities such as Valley Center and Ramona, which have traditionally been primarily agricultural but now function increasingly as bedroom communities for the more populous areas to their south and west, are generally included within inland North County. More remote inland communities like Julian and Borrego Springs are generally not included. Some consider communities in the northern parts of the city of San Diego like Rancho Bernardo, Rancho Peñasquitos, and Carmel Valley to be part of North County as well.

Both coastal and inland North County contain two types of topography. In coastal areas of North County, the land is generally flat with low rolling hills. The beaches are sandy with occasional tidepools and rocky reefs. In some cases, the coast is dominated by bluff type geography, where the land meeting the ocean sharply drops into the sea with a short beach. In some cases, such as in Encinitas, a whole city is bisected by a coastal foothill ridge. The foothills of mountains soon become visible as one travels further east and encounters the rocky peaks of inland North County. Such peaks include Black Mountain, San Marcos Mountain, Palomar Mountain. The coastal area also becomes more rugged to the north, where the Santa Margarita Mountains dominate the area within the Marine Corps Base Camp Pendleton.

Rivers and creeks that flow west from the mountains farther inland mostly end up draining into the region's four main lagoons. Throughout their course, these rivers are interrupted by many lakes and reservoirs which support an array of native species.

Spanning 125,000 acres (510 km^{2}) in the northwestern corner of the county, Marine Corps Base Camp Pendleton forms a large buffer separating the coastal populated areas of North County from neighboring Orange County, preventing the creation of a complete coastal megalopolis stretching from Malibu to Imperial Beach.

=== Ecology ===
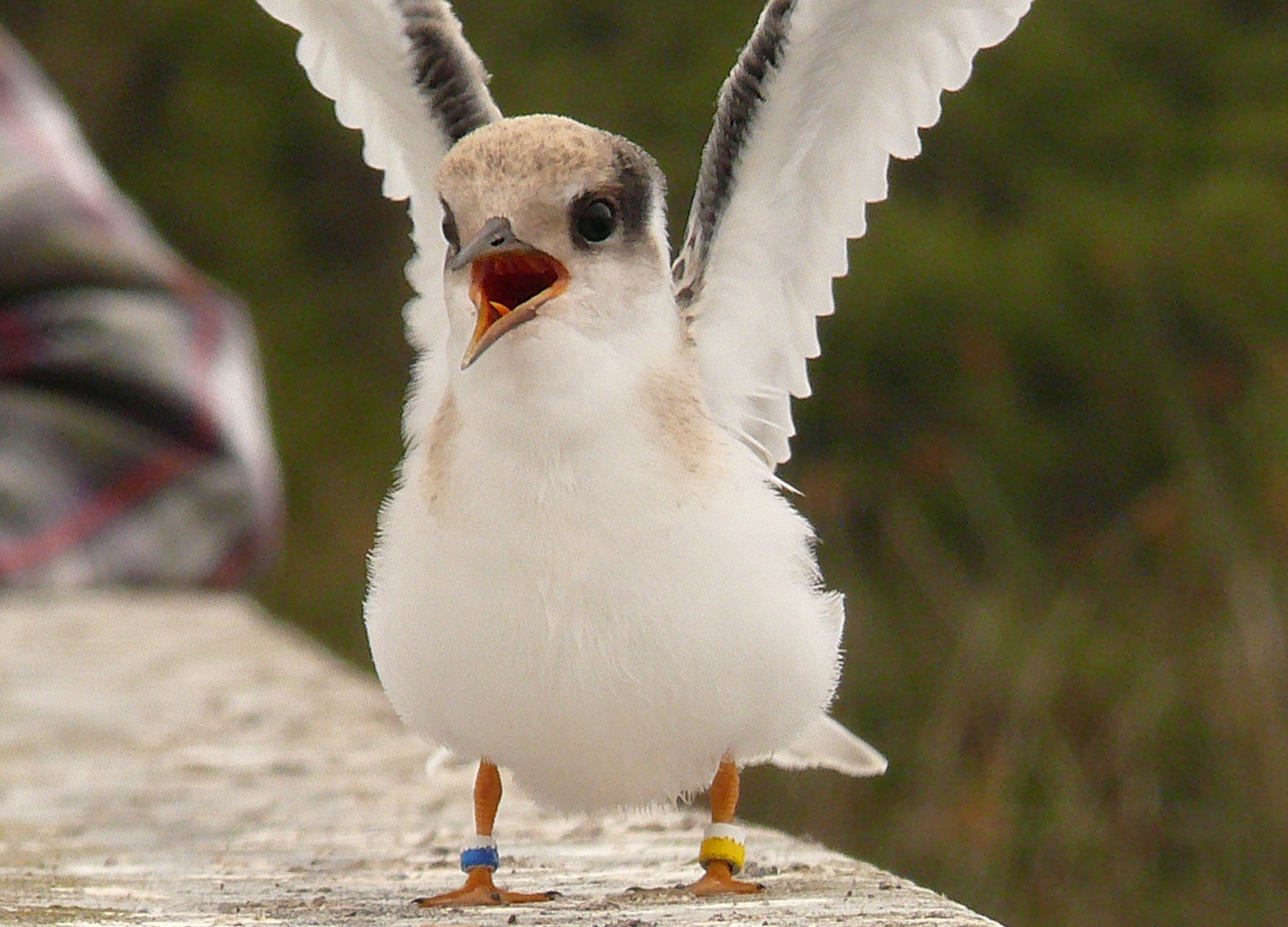
California least tern

The region has strong ties to its coastline and has made notable efforts to preserve many marine environments, including lagoons and tidal wetlands, many of those being the final few on the South Coast. Unlike developments in many Orange County coastal cities, the lagoons and large areas of coast have not yet been so heavily developed. Major lagoons and inlets lining the coast from north to south include: Oceanside Harbor, Buena Vista Lagoon, Agua Hedionda Lagoon, Batiquitos Lagoon, San Elijo Lagoon, and Los Peñasquitos Lagoon.

=== Flora and fauna ===
The lagoons provide valuable wetland habitat for many birds, reptiles, fish, and plant species. The waters off the coast are also very rich in species diversity, supporting large kelp forests and rocky reefs.

Fish species included the tidewater goby, topsmelt, striped mullet, surfperch and Pacific staghorn sculpin. Leopard sharks forage near the lagoons, and their pups frequent the shallow rocky reefs off the coast.

Bird species included the great blue heron, snowy plover, Ridgway's rail and least tern. The lagoons support various species of shorebirds, wading birds, waterfowl, raptors and diving birds. The number of bird species in the San Dieguito wetlands have tripled due to restoration projects by Del Mar.

The Torrey Pine is also one of the most famous trees in the region.

== Culture ==
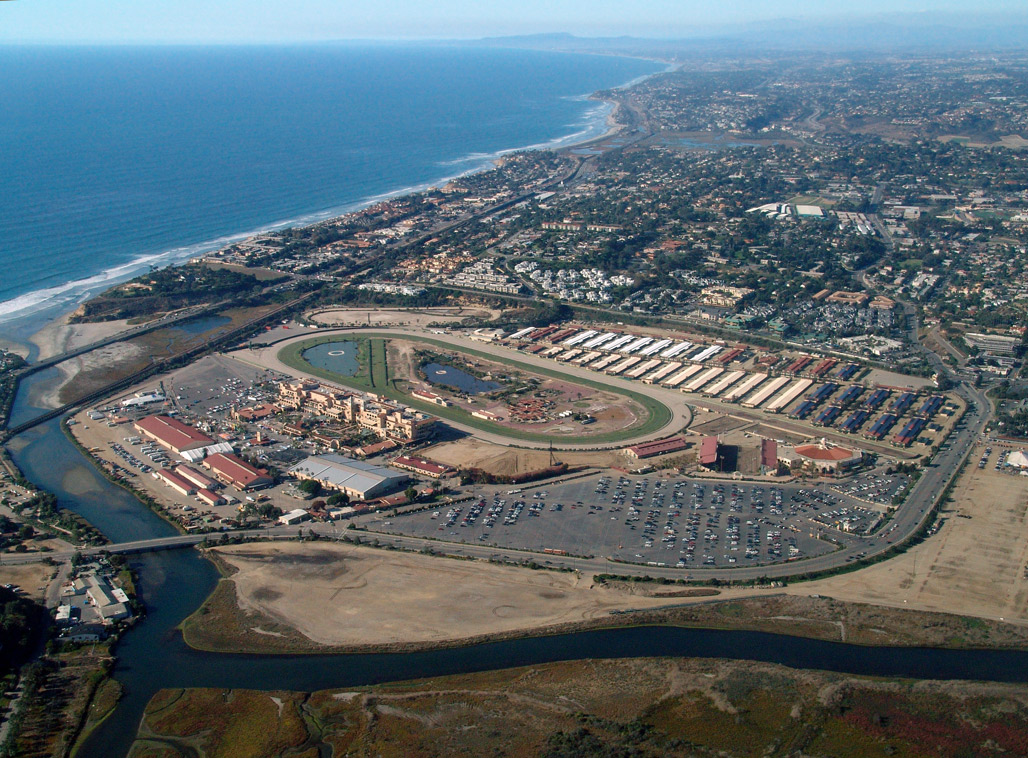
Del Mar, located on the coast immediately north of San Diego

=== Recreation ===
North County contains forty golf courses, including Torrey Pines, which hosted the 2008 and 2021 U.S. Open. North County is also known for its beaches, which stretch about thirty miles from Del Mar to San Onofre. These beaches experience a large tourist influx from June to November. Symbolic of North County's surf culture are the various statues proliferating the region including the Cardiff Kook in Cardiff-by-the-Sea. As surf culture is an integral part of North County, so is equestrian culture. Numerous equestrian centers, including the Del Mar Fairgrounds, Rancho Camino Equestrian Center, and San Diego Country Estates International Equestrian Center, are found in the region from Del Mar to San Diego Country Estates.

North County is home to Southern California's only five-star, five-diamond and Michelin starred restaurants: Addison at The Grand Del Mar (three Michelin stars), and El Bizcocho at Rancho Bernardo Inn.

=== Fairs and shopping ===
The Del Mar Fairgrounds is home to one of the most famous racetracks in the world and is the site of the annual San Diego County Fair. Shopping malls include the Mershops North County in Escondido and The Shoppes at Carlsbad in Carlsbad. The Cedros Design District in Solana Beach offers more than 85 shops, boutiques and galleries that specialize in antiques, handmade jewelry, unique artifacts, fine art, and more. Famous beaches include Moonlight Beach in Encinitas and the Oceanside Pier.

=== In the media ===
Locations in North County appear in popular television and films. Camp Pendleton is often featured in military-themed shows such as NCIS: Los Angeles, and is the setting of the first season of Major Dad. The Del Mar Fair is also portrayed in shows such as Entourage. Veronica Mars is set in a fictional city north of San Diego; much of the show was filmed in Oceanside. Other crime-related shows, such as TNT's Animal Kingdom and Netflix's American Vandal, are filmed and set in Oceanside. For two seasons the Showtime comedy Weeds was set in the fictional San Diego suburb of Ren Mar, which is implied to be in North County. The Big Bang Theory, which is set in Pasadena, features an episode ("The Zarnecki Incursion") where the main characters make a three-hour drive to Carlsbad to confront a World of Warcraft hacker.

A notable fictional character from North County is shock jock Dave Rickards' "Aunt Edna", frequently featured on the popular Dave, Shelly, and Chainsaw radio program, which airs in the San Diego area.

== Demographics ==
North County has historically been wealthier and more conservative than the city of San Diego and has traditionally leaned toward the Republican Party. In recent decades, the region has shifted toward the Democratic Party, reflecting broader political trends observed in highly educated metropolitan areas in the United States. This shift has been most pronounced along the coast, while some inland communities continue to lean Republican, particularly more rural ones.

White-collar jobs outnumber blue-collar jobs at a ratio of 3:1. More people have Bachelor of Arts degrees than associate's degrees at a ratio of 2:1. More people are married than single by 2:1. Statistics compiled by the San Diego County Health and Human Services Agency reveal that coastal North County is 59% white, 18% Hispanic and 6% Asian, with black people and people of other races less than 5%. Inland North County has roughly the same racial makeup, except that 9% are Asian. 19% of coastal North County residents make more than $100,000 per year, and 44% make less than $45,000, with the rest in the medium income range. Inland North County income stats are largely the same, except that only 42% make less than $45,000.

== Communities ==
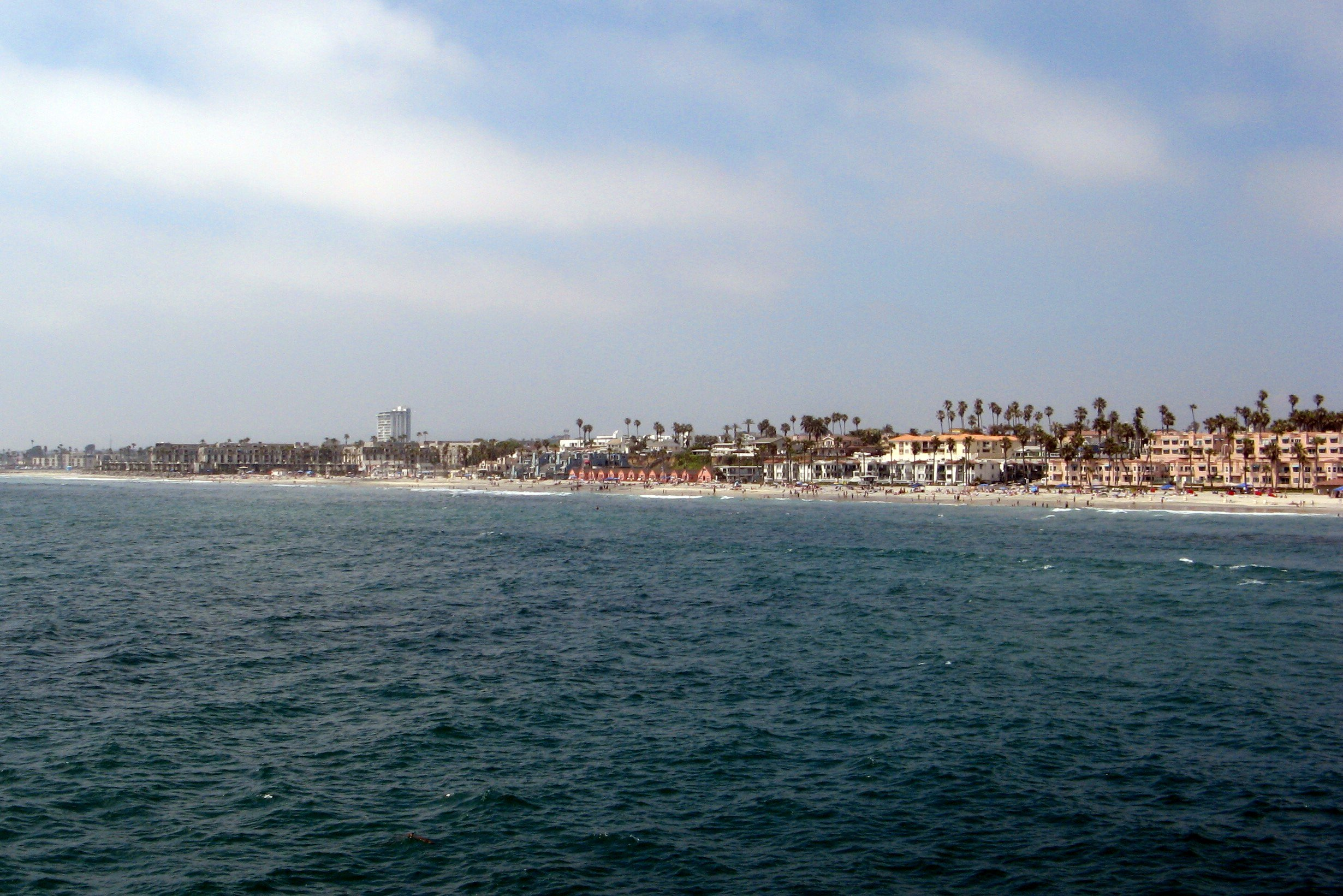
Oceanside is the most populous city in North County.

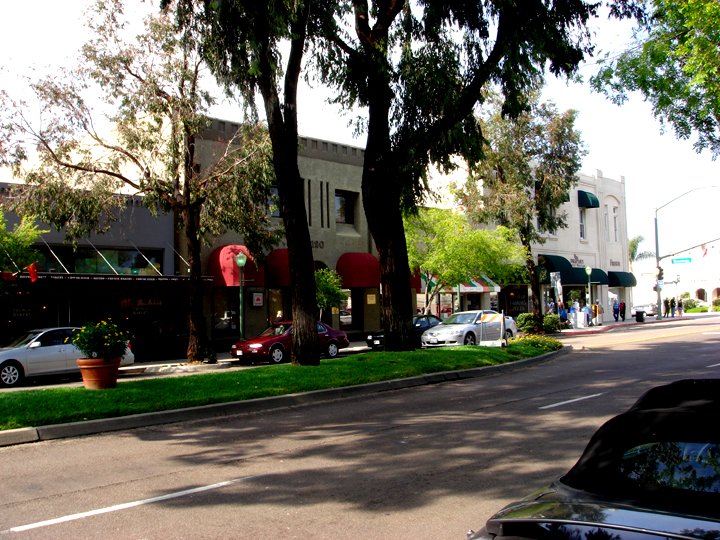
Escondido is the most populous inland city in North County.

The populations listed are from the 2020 census.

=== Cities ===
- Oceanside - 174,068
- Escondido - 151,038
- Carlsbad - 114,746
- Vista - 98,381
- San Marcos - 94,833
- Encinitas - 62,007
- Poway - 48,841
- Solana Beach - 12,941
- Del Mar - 3,954

=== Census-designated places (CDPs) ===
- Fallbrook - 32,267
- Camp Pendleton South - 12,468
- San Diego Country Estates - 10,395
- Valley Center - 10,087
- Camp Pendleton Mainside - 9,683
- Lake San Marcos - 5,328
- Bonsall - 4,546
- Hidden Meadows - 4,484
- Rancho Santa Fe - 3,156
- Fairbanks Ranch - 3,002
- Harmony Grove - 2,079
- Rainbow - 1,884
- Pala - 1,490
- Elfin Forest - 600
- Del Dios - 396

=== Other unincorporated communities ===
- 4S Ranch
- De Luz
- De Luz Heights
- Jesmond Dene
- Pala Mesa
- Pauma Valley
- Rincon

== Education ==
=== Primary and secondary ===
School districts in the region include the:

- Bonsall Unified School District
- Cardiff School District
- Carlsbad Unified School District
- Encinitas Union School District
- Escondido Union School District
- Escondido Union High School District
- Fallbrook Union Elementary School District
- Fallbrook Union High School District
- Oceanside Unified School District
- Poway Unified School District
- Ramona Unified School District
- San Dieguito Union High School District
- San Pasqual Union School District
- San Marcos Unified School District
- Valley Center-Pauma Unified School District
- Vista Unified School District

School districts often overlap city boundaries. Depending on the ZIP Codes of the cities and their proximity to respective schools and school districts, school districts will serve parts of different cities.

=== Colleges and universities ===
North County is home to several colleges:

- California State University, San Marcos (CSUSM), four-year university in San Marcos, offering undergraduate, graduate, and doctorate programs
- Palomar College, a community college based in San Marcos, with six other education sites in North San Diego County
- MiraCosta College, a community college based in Oceanside.
- MiraCosta College San Elijo Campus, an extension of MiraCosta College in Cardiff, Encinitas.

== Media ==
=== Newspaper ===
In 1995, several local newspapers merged to form the North County Times. This newspaper served the region until 2012, when it was purchased by Doug Manchester and became an edition of the San Diego Union-Tribune. On March 7, 2013, the separate U-T North County Times name was dropped and a U-T North County edition produced which further integrates U-T with North County-specific pages, while eliminating differences between the two.

=== Radio ===
In addition to being served by radio stations from San Diego and Tijuana, North County is served by FM stations KSSX, KSON, KMYI, KLQV, KARJ, KSSD, KKLJ, and KSDW and AM stations KFSD, KPRZ, and KKSM. Several Los Angeles stations can also be picked up, including KYSR, KIIS-FM, KBIG KLYY, and KDLD

=== Television ===
North County is served by the ABC affiliate KGTV, CBS and CW affiliate KFMB, NBC affiliate KNSD, and FOX affiliate KSWB—all San Diego stations. Other local stations include KUSI in San Diego

== Landmarks ==
Important landmarks in North County include Del Mar Racetrack, Mission San Luis Rey de Francia, Lake San Marcos, Oceanside Pier, Twin Peaks, and Palomar Mountain, home of the Palomar Observatory.

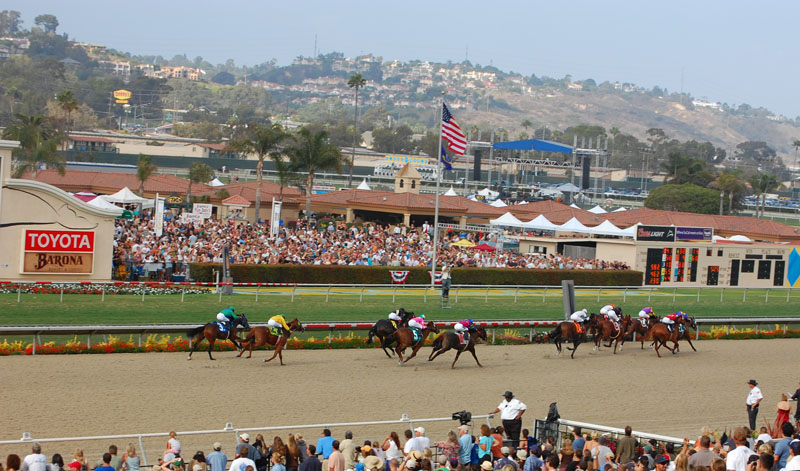
Del Mar Racetrack

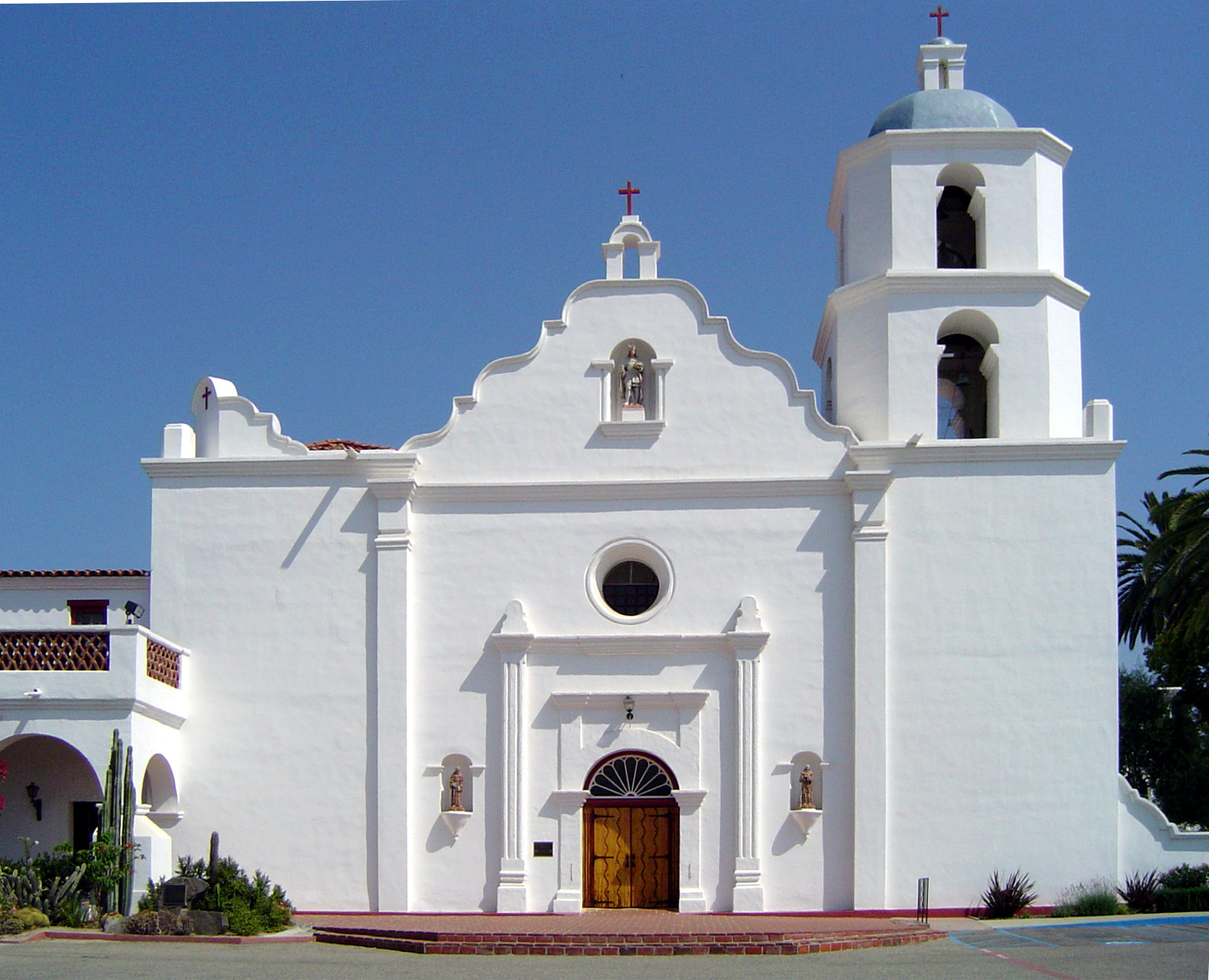
Mission San Luis Rey de Francia

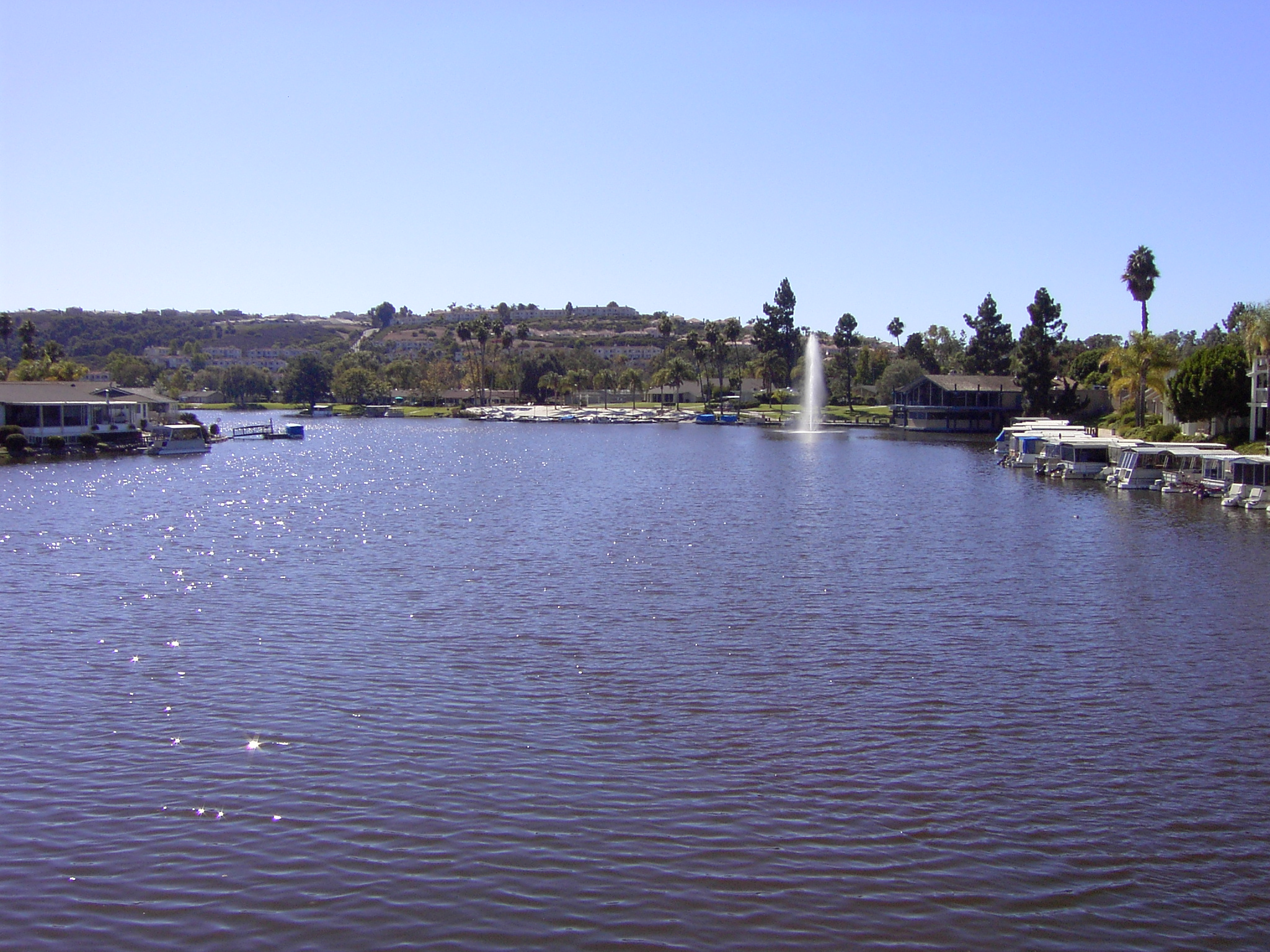
Lake San Marcos

Oceanside Pier

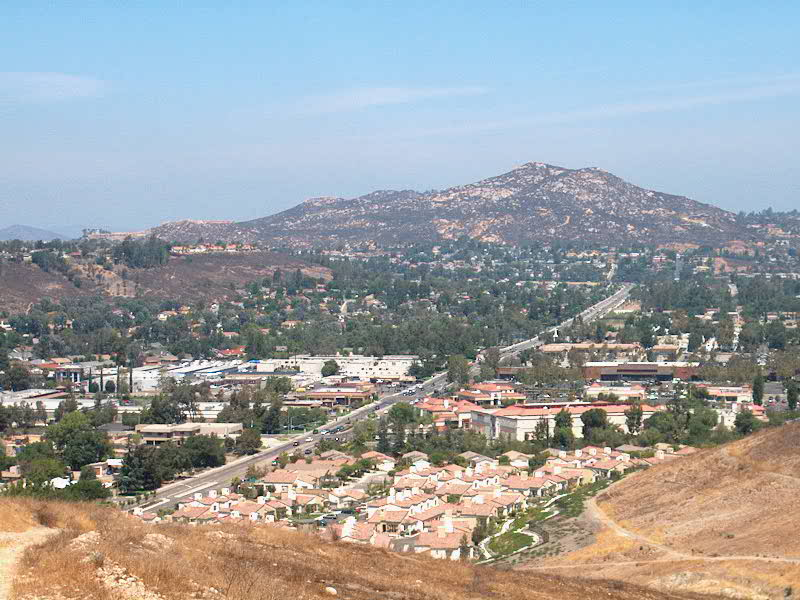
Twin Peaks, Poway

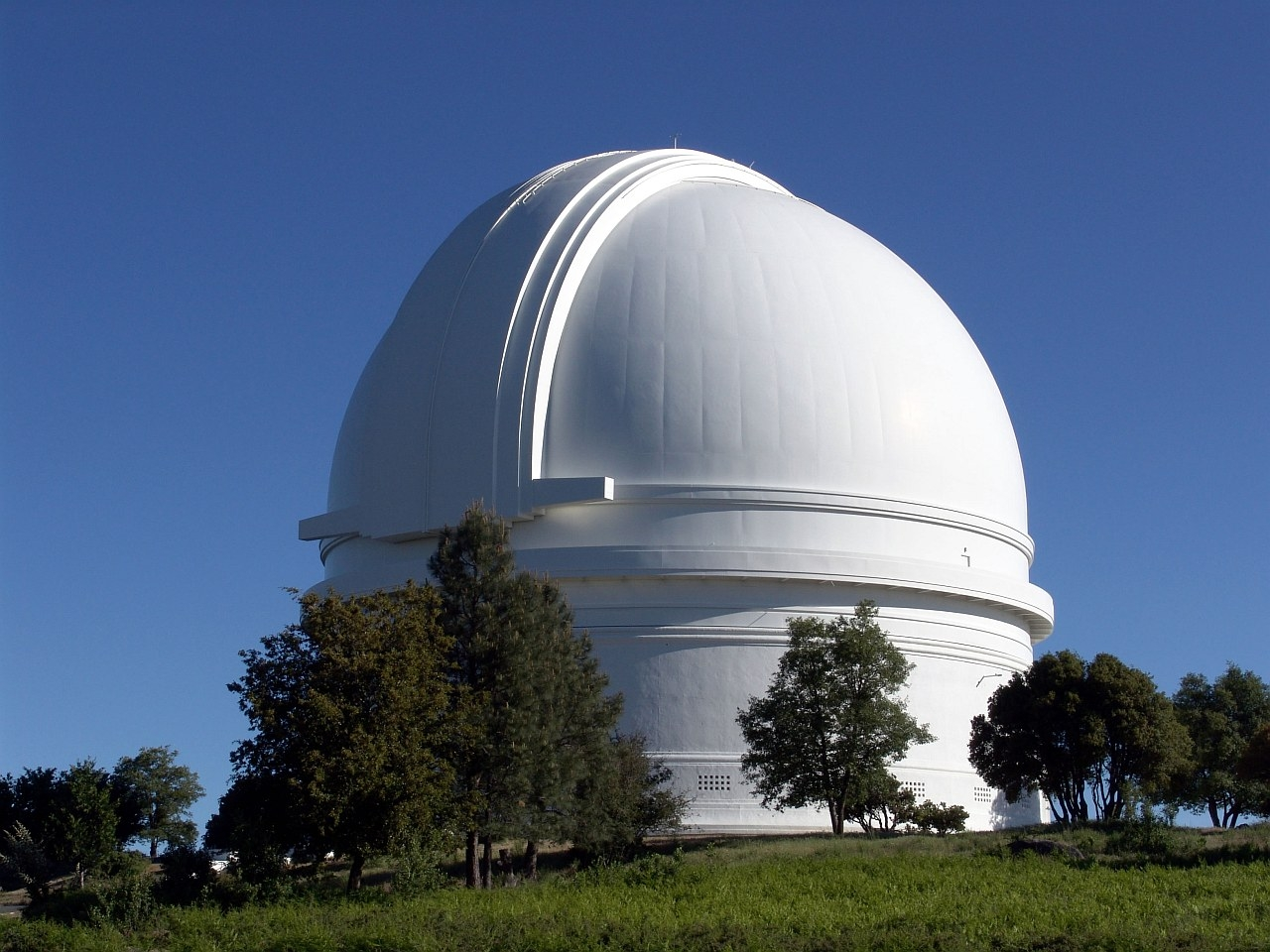
Palomar Observatory

== Politics ==
North County is represented at the federal level by Representatives Darrell Issa (R–48th district), Mike Levin (D–49th district), and Scott Peters (D–50th district).

At the state level, North County is represented by State Senators Brian Jones (R–38th district), Patricia Bates (R–36th district), and Toni Atkins (D–39th district).

Most of North County is located within County Supervisorial District 5 and is represented on the county's Board of Supervisors by Jim Desmond, formerly the mayor of San Marcos. The remainder of North County is in Districts 2 and 3, represented by Joel Anderson and Terra Lawson-Remer, respectively.

== See also ==
- East County
- South Bay
