= Keever =

Keever is a given name. Notable people with the name include:

- Charlie Keever (1980–1993), 13-year-old boy who was murdered in 1993, in San Diego County, California
- Jack Keever (1938–2004), American journalist and author, best known his coverage of Charles Whitman's 1966 shooting spree
- Patsy Keever (born 1947), American educator and Democratic politician
- Trijntje Keever (1616–1633), the tallest female person in recorded history, standing 2.54 metres (8 ft 4 in) tall
- Keever Jankovich (1928–1979), American football player
