= South Bay (San Diego County) =

- Region
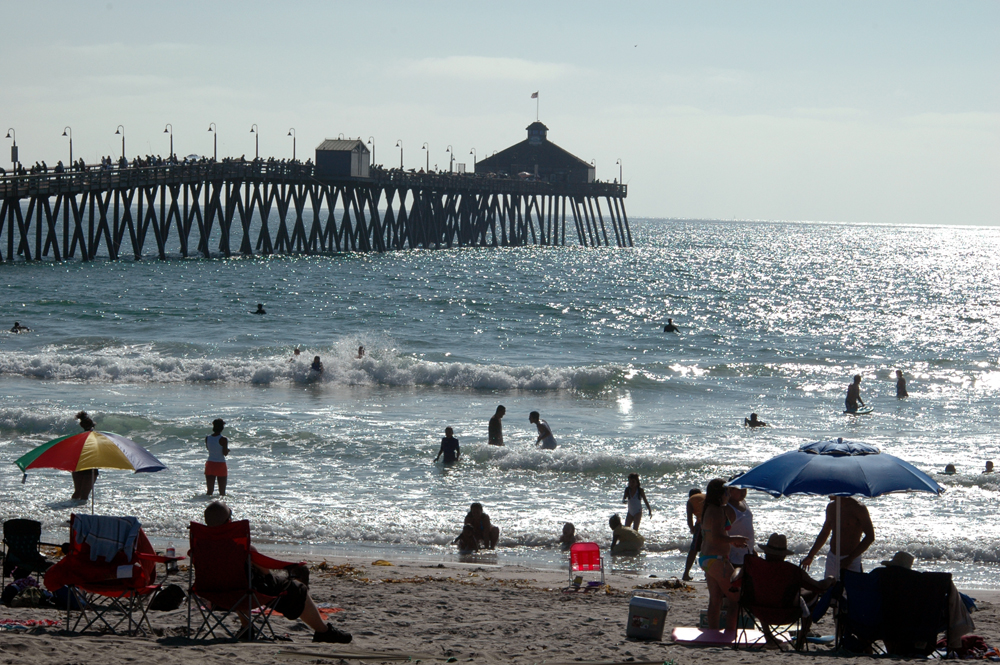
- Imperial Beach Pier in South Bay

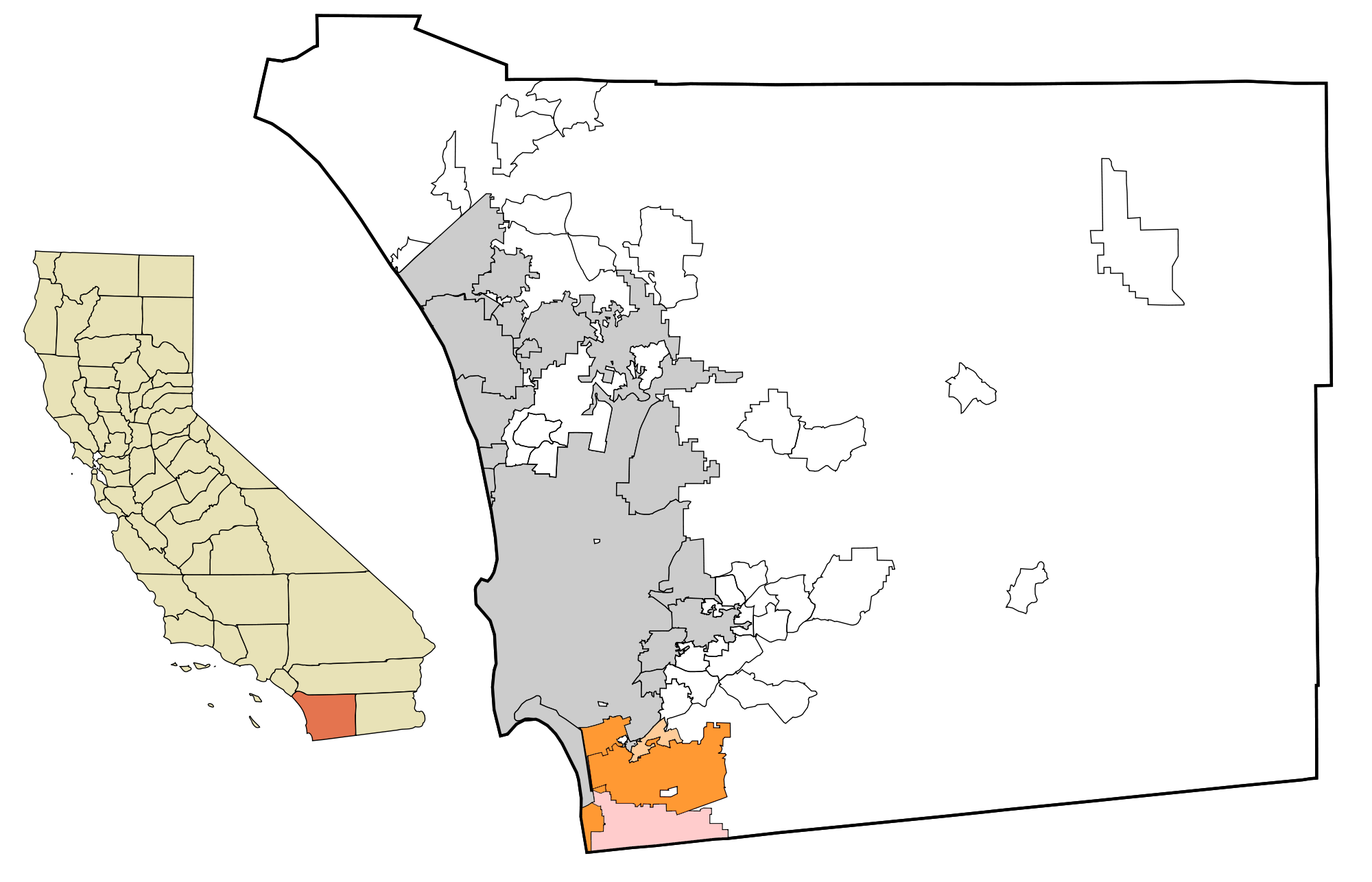
- The South Bay region, with cities shown in orange, the unincorporated community Bonita in pale orange, and South San Diego in pink
- County: San Diego County

Population
  - Total: 453,901

The South Bay, also known as South County, is a region in southwestern San Diego County, California, consisting of the cities and unincorporated communities of Bonita, Chula Vista, Otay Mesa, East Otay Mesa, Otay Mesa West, Imperial Beach, Lincoln Acres, National City, and South San Diego.

Defined by its proximity to San Diego Bay and the Mexico-United States border, the South Bay is a mix of heavy industrial complexes and shipyards alongside beaches and residential developments. One of its cities, Imperial Beach, bills itself as "Classic Southern California" for being relatively untouched in terms of other coastal cities.

== History ==
The area encompassing the South Bay was originally inhabited by the Kumeyaay peoples. Under Mexican rule, several Mexican land grants were established in the region, including Rancho Janal, Rancho Otay, and Rancho de la Nación. In the 1870s, South Bay Salt Works began operations. National City was incorporated in 1887, Chula Vista in 1911, and Imperial Beach in 1956. South San Diego, including the communities of San Ysidro, Nestor, Palm City, and Otay Mesa, was annexed by the City of San Diego in 1957.

The term "South Bay" has referred to the region since at least the early 20th century, with one reference dating from 1918.

In 1993, Two boys (Charlie Keever and Jonathan Sellers) were found raped and murdered by Scott Erskine along the Otay River.

In October 2007, South Bay was quickly encroached upon by the Harris Fire, part of a series of fires that ravaged California in the 2007 Fire season.

Traditionally more residential and calmer than North County, in 2010 regional cities were taking on projects that included the development of luxury resorts in efforts to revitalize the South Bay. On May 18, 2010, further development of the Chula Vista Bayfront was authorized by the Unified Port of San Diego and City of Chula Vista. Plans included marina expansion, luxury resort development, and the addition of a conference center. Additionally, in Imperial Beach, on September 29, 2010, the Seacoast Inn was demolished to make room for a $20 million resort.

== Geography ==
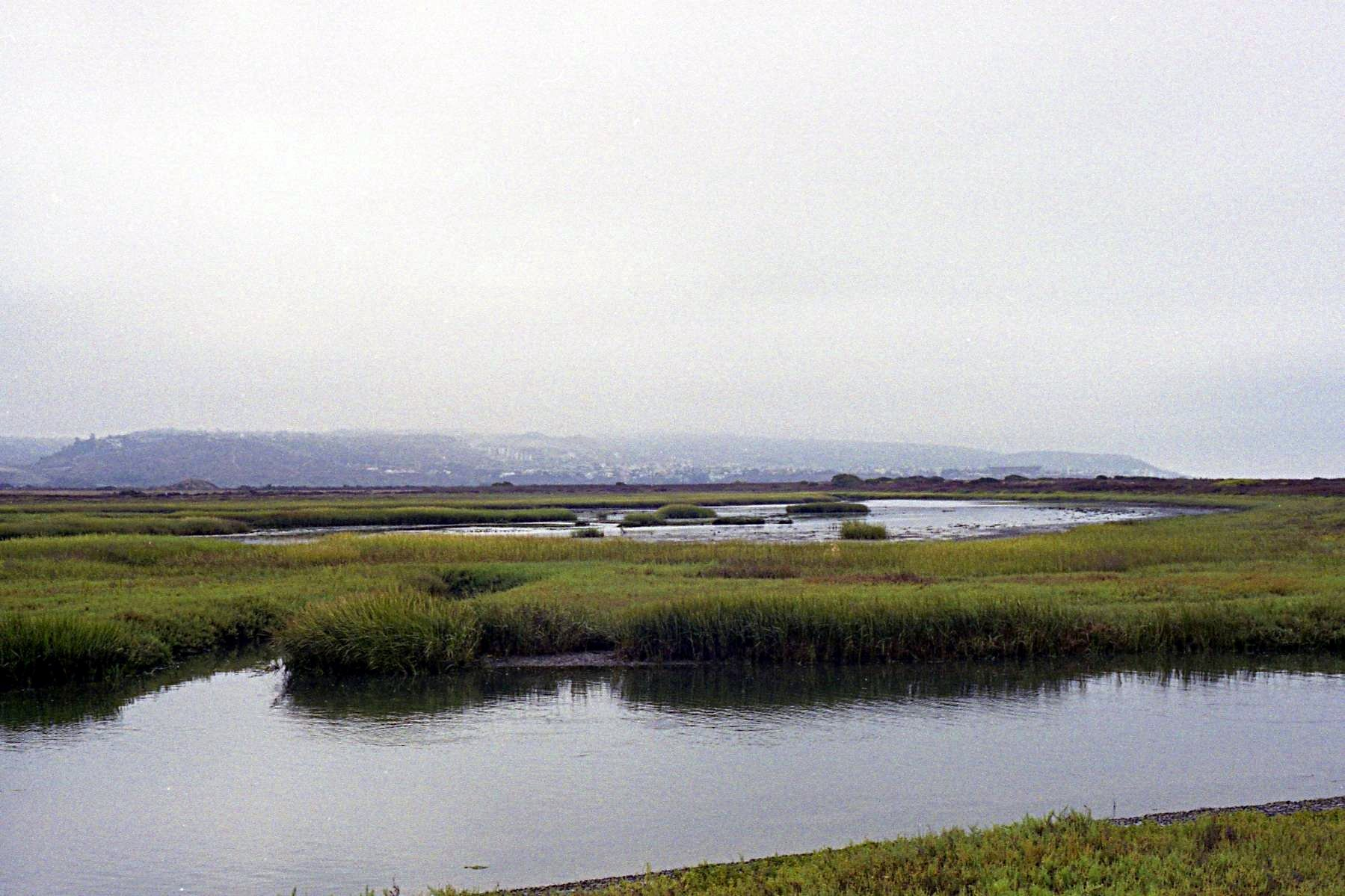
Tijuana River Estuary with Tijuana Hills in the back

South Bay borders both San Diego Bay and the Pacific Ocean. The region is at the southern end of the bay and the western slope of the coastal mountains to the east. There are a few creeks that make their way from these mountains with their terminus in either the southern end of the bay, the ocean, or the Tijuana River estuary. Its boundaries are San Diego Bay on the west, the United States–Mexico border on the south, National City's border with northern San Diego and Coronado to the north, and the unincorporated communities and Otay Lakes to the east.

=== Ecology ===
Nature preserve areas in South Bay include San Diego Bay National Wildlife Refuge, Otay Mountain Wilderness, Tijuana Slough National Wildlife Refuge and Tijuana River National Estuarine Research Reserve. The Tijuana River Estuary is located on the southern coast of South Bay. The river that feeds it has a watershed that drains from both Tijuana Municipality and San Diego County. There have been problems with the cleanliness of the estuary, from the Tijuana part of the watershed, which has led to constructive measures with efforts to clean the water. Located within the Tijuana River National Estuarine Reserve, the Tijuana River estuary is the largest wetland in Southern California. The wetland supports over 370 species of migratory and year-round dwelling waterfowl.

== Demographics ==
The population was 462,843 as of 2005, an 18.3% increase from 2000. South Bay is the third-largest region of Greater San Diego in population, ahead of East County and behind North County.

The South Bay is known for its relatively large immigrant population, with many first-generation Mexican-Americans and Filipino-Americans. 26% of San Diego County's Hispanic population, the vast majority of which is of Mexican origin, lives in the South Bay. As of January 2018, descendants of the early explorers of Alta California continue to live in the South Bay.

As of 2010, South San Diego, National City, and Chula Vista have Hispanic majorities, while Imperial Beach has a Hispanic plurality and Bonita has a non-Hispanic white plurality.

== Communities ==
Populations are as of the 2020 census except for South San Diego.

=== Incorporated cities ===
- Chula Vista - 275,487
- City of San Diego (South San Diego) - 107,631 (2010)
- National City - 56,173
- Imperial Beach - 26,137

=== Census-designated place ===
- Bonita - 12,917

=== Other unincorporated communities ===
- East Otay Mesa
- Lincoln Acres

=== Federal military reservations ===
- Naval Base San Diego, San Diego
- Naval Outlying Landing Field Imperial Beach, Imperial Beach
- Silver Strand Training Complex, Coronado

== Education ==
Southwestern College campus

=== Primary and secondary schools ===
South Bay is served by the Sweetwater Union High School District, Chula Vista Elementary School District, National School District, San Ysidro School District, and the South Bay Union School District. There are approximately fourteen high schools, fourteen middle schools, and numerous elementary schools. The South Bay area is also served by charter and private schools.

=== Colleges and universities ===
Located in Chula Vista is Southwestern College, a two-year community college and feeder school to University of California, San Diego and San Diego State University.

== Government ==
The South County Regional Center contains the South Bay Courthouse of the San Diego Superior Court as well as offices for the San Diego County Sheriff, the San Diego District Attorney, the San Diego County Board of Supervisors, and others. The center is located in downtown Chula Vista.

== Media ==
=== Newspapers ===
South Bay is served by The San Diego Union-Tribune, whose website features a "South County" section that is largely congruent with South Bay, although the "South County" section includes Coronado. South Bay also receives coverage from the weekly San Diego Reader.

Chula Vista, National City, and Bonita are served by the weekly newspaper The Star-News, which was formed in 1954 upon the merger of the Chula Vista Star with the National City News. Imperial Beach is served by the weekly Imperial Beach and South County Eagle & Times.

San Ysidro was once served by the weekly San Ysidro Border Press.

=== Radio ===
No radio station is licensed to any city in the South Bay area. The area is instead served by stations licensed to the Baja California municipalities of Tijuana and Tecate, all of which effectively cover the area. However, XHLTN-FM maintains a sales office in Chula Vista, and XHGLX-FM had a similar setup in National City, both stations sending data to cross-border control rooms. The area is also served by other San Diego area radio stations. During tropospheric ducting, the signals of out-of-market stations KYSR, KBIG, KRTH, and KRUZ can reach the area, while sensitive radio tuners have picked up KIIS-FM on occasion.

=== Television ===
Terrestrial digital television stations KNSD and KUSI-TV have their transmitters on Mount San Miguel. The area is also served by XETV and XHDTV. The selection of local stations on cable and satellite services vary by provider.

== Landmarks ==
Important landmarks in South Bay include:

- San Ysidro Port of Entry (Mexico-U.S. border crossing at San Ysidro)
- Border Field State Park (includes Friendship Park)
- The Tijuana River Estuary and Tijuana River National Estuarine Research Reserve
- The Chula Vista Bayfront
- North Island Credit Union Amphitheatre
- Imperial Beach Pier
- Onstage Playhouse
- The National City Depot
- Sweetwater Dam
- Surfhenge.
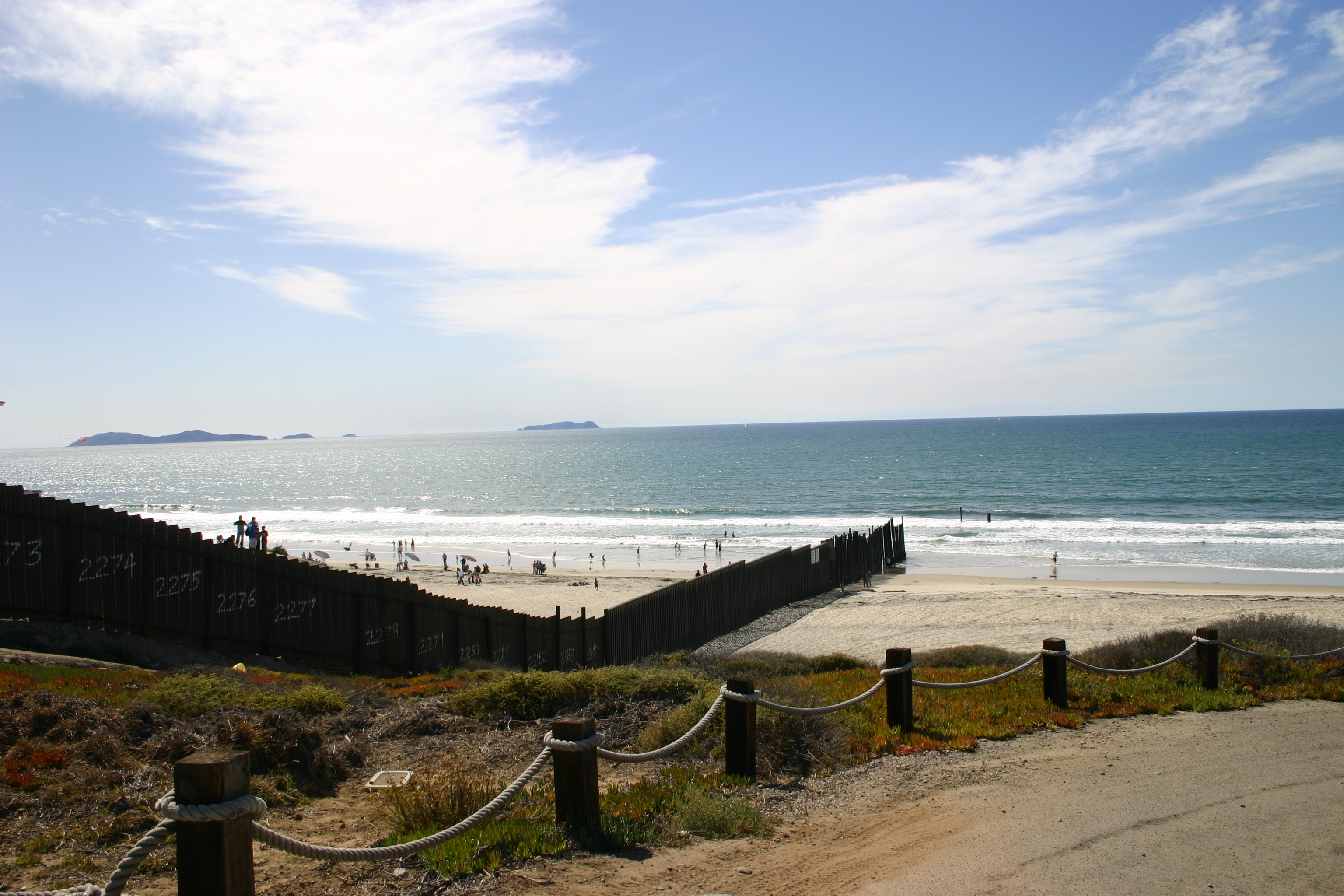
Border Field State Park

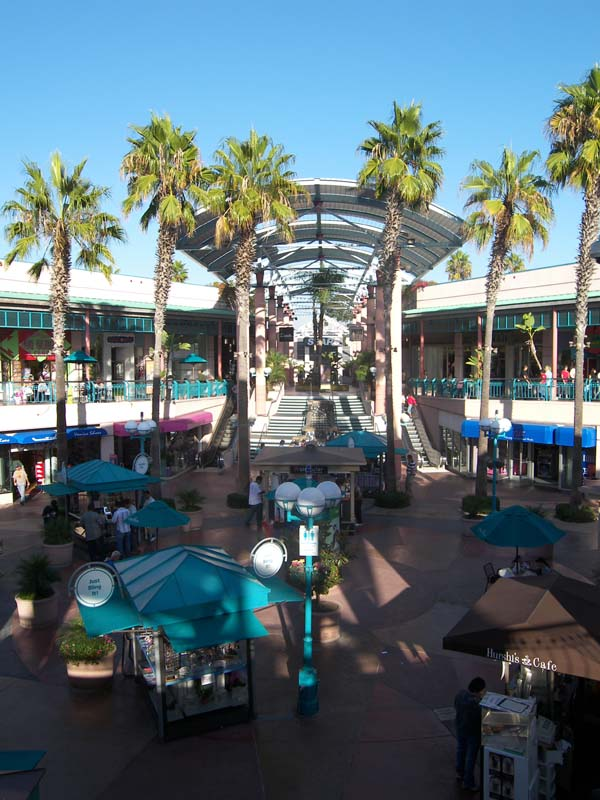
Chula Vista Shopping Center

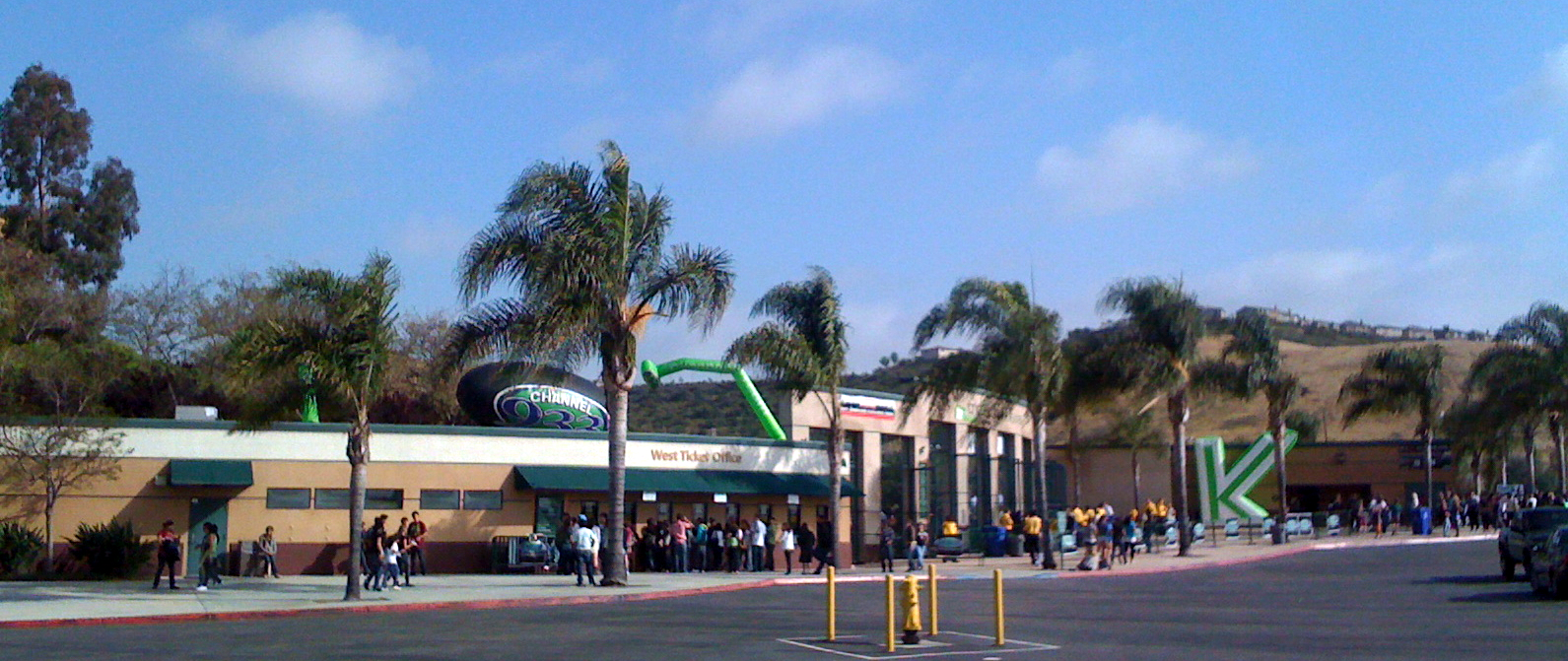
North Island Credit Union Amphitheatre

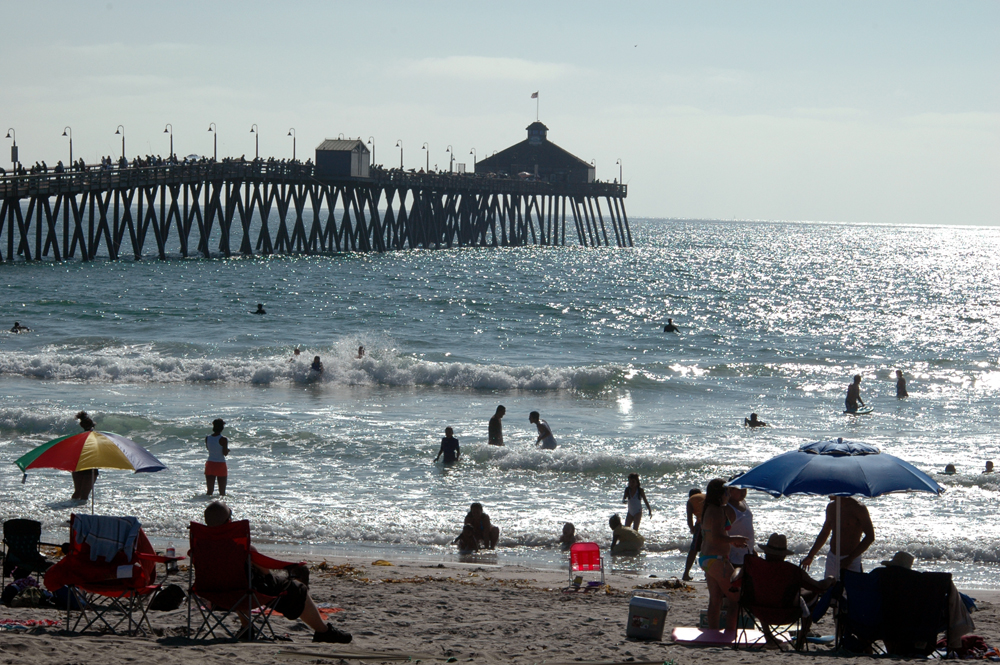
Imperial Beach Pier

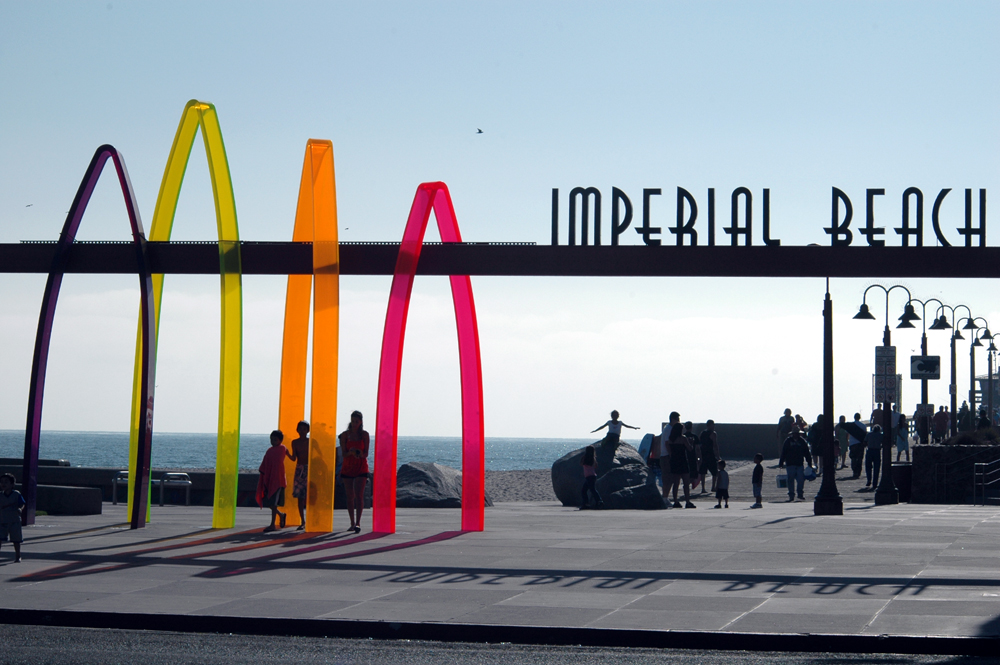
Surfhenge in Imperial Beach

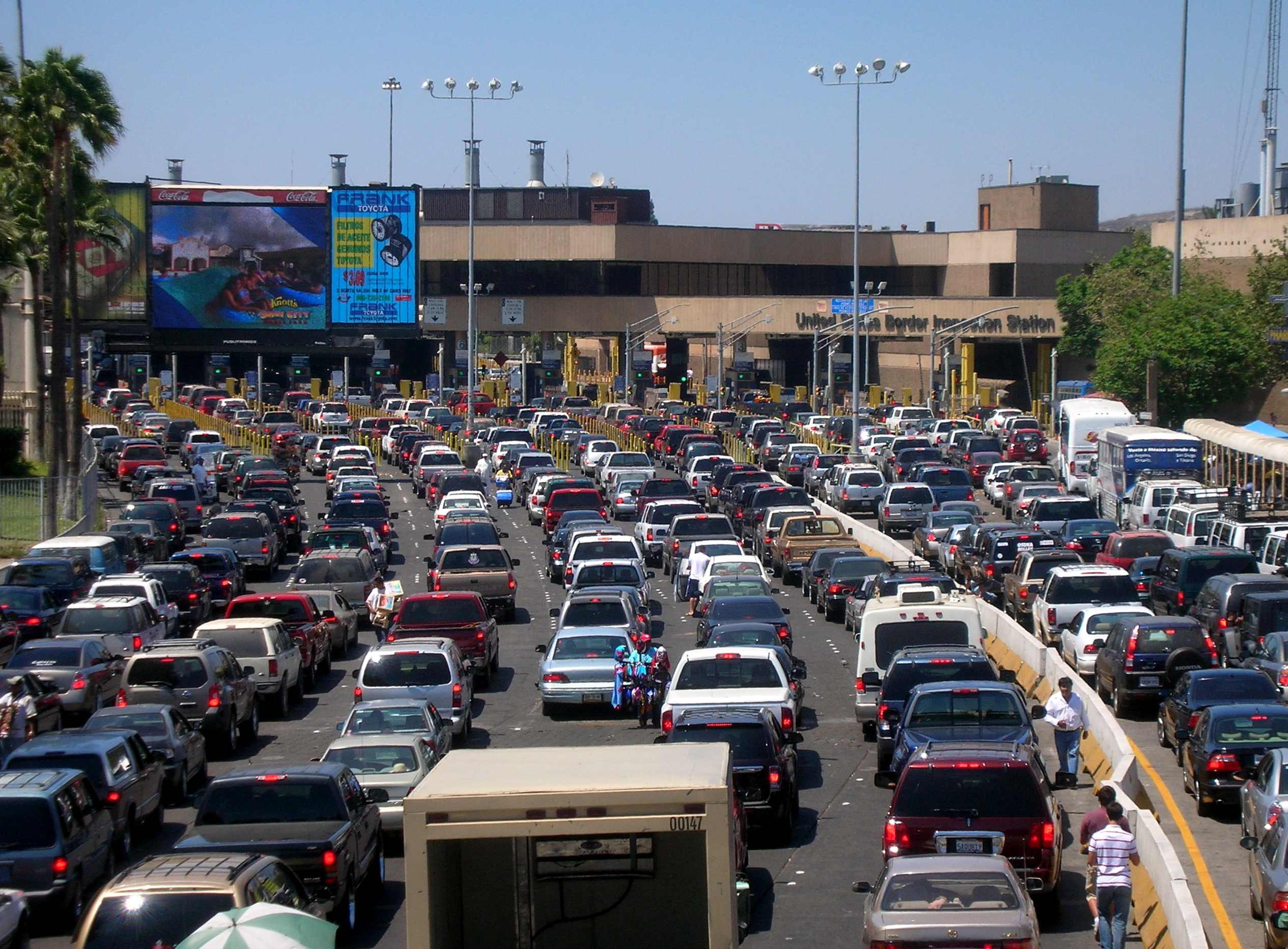
San Ysidro Port of Entry

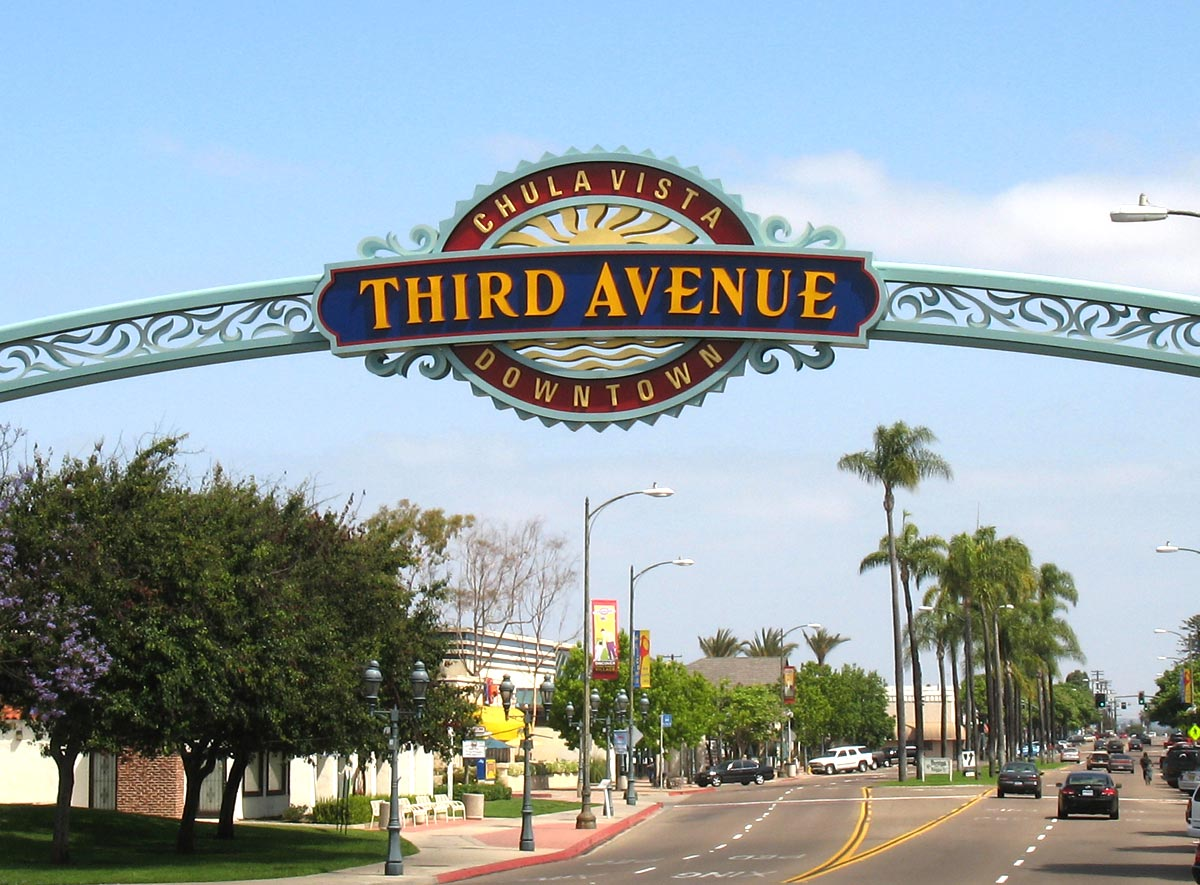
Downtown Chula Vista

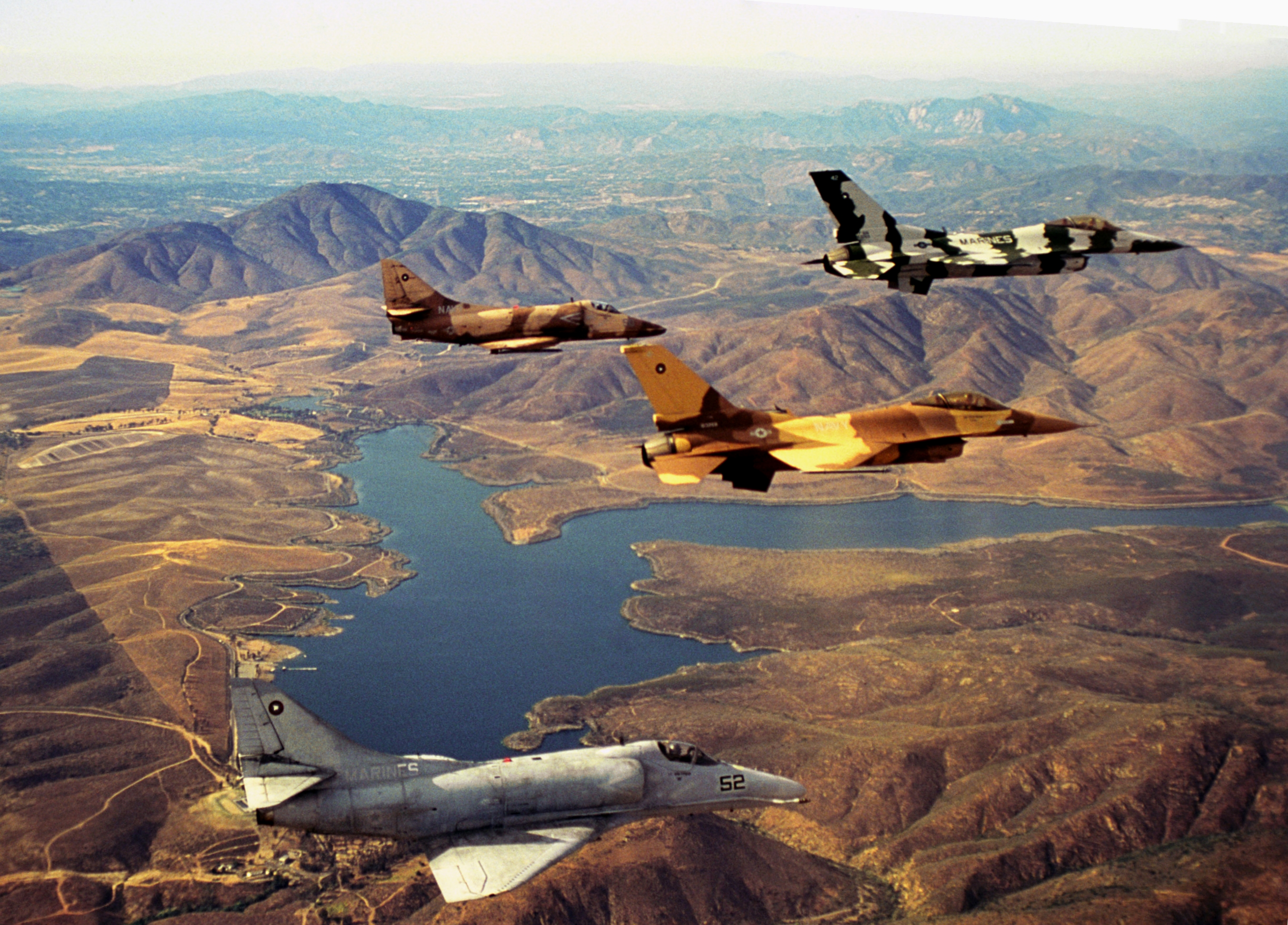
Lower Otay Lake

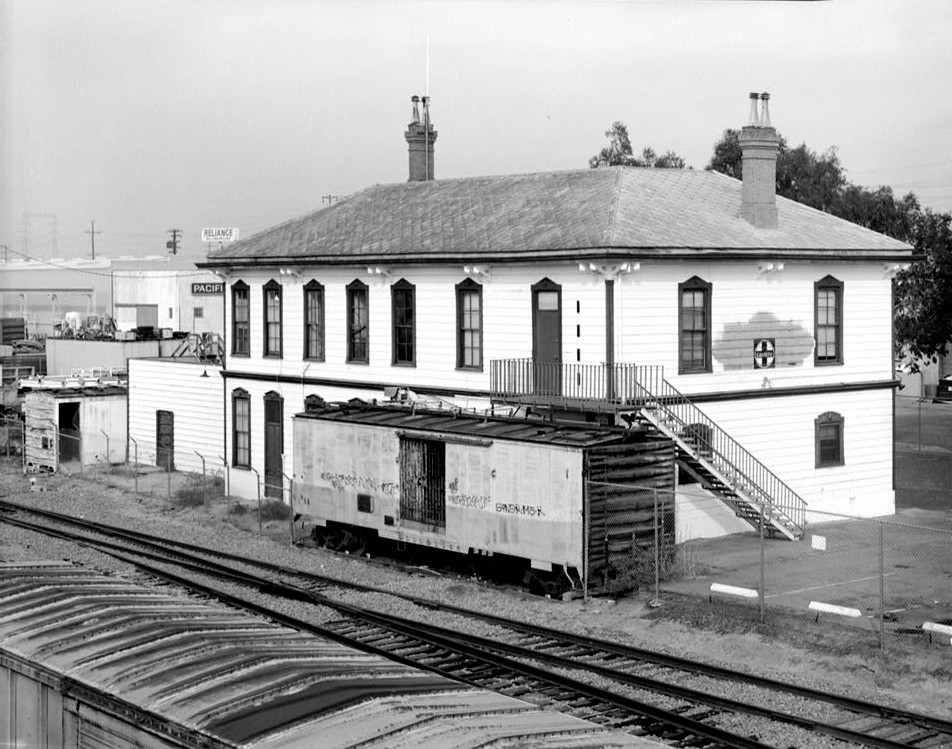
National City Depot

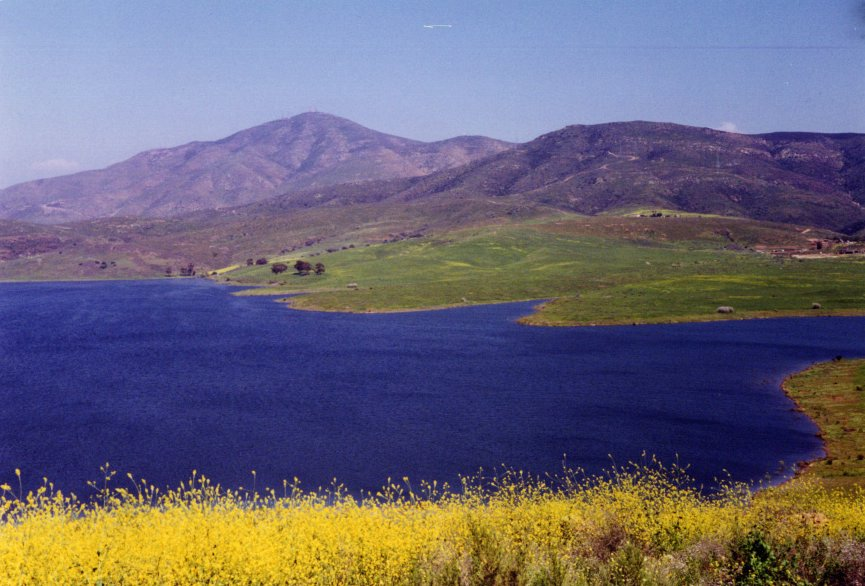
Sweetwater Reservoir

== Politics ==
South Bay is located entirely within Supervisorial District 1 at the county level, which is represented by Democrat Nora Vargas.

== See also ==
- North County
- East County
- Otay River
- Sweetwater River
