= San Elijo =

San Elijo may refer to various locations in San Diego County, California:

- San Elijo Lagoon
- San Elijo Middle School
- San Elijo College
- San Elijo Hills, San Marcos, California
- San Elijo State Beach
