= Manuel Machado =

Manuel Machado may refer to:

- Manuel Machado (composer) (1590–1646), Portuguese composer of early Baroque music
- Manuel Machado (football manager) (born 1955), Portuguese football manager
- Manuel Machado (poet) (1874–1947), Spanish poet, part of the Generation of '98
- Manny Machado (Manuel Arturo Machado, born 1992), Dominican-American professional baseball player
- Manuel Machado Alvarez (1960–2020), Cuban murderer
