= Chula Vista Bayfront =

Planned development in California, US

Coordinates: 32.6253°N 117.0979°W

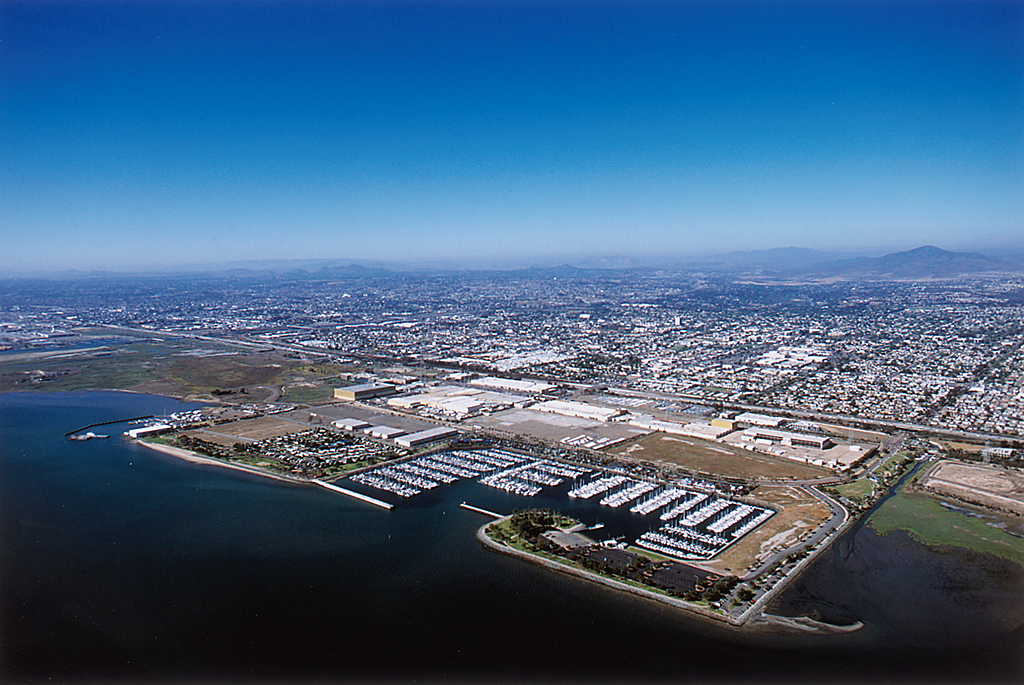
Marina at Chula Vista. The proposed bay front will rise directly behind the marina.

The Chula Vista Bayfront is a planned development on the waterfront of San Diego Bay within Chula Vista, California, United States. The bayfront is undergoing major development under the project title Chula Vista Bayfront Master Plan, one of the largest waterfront planning efforts in the United States.

== History ==
Efforts to improve or renovate the city's bayfront date back to at least 1970. Before the marina was developed by the Port of San Diego, the bayfront was little more than an inlet of the bay.

The Chula Vista Bayfront Master Plan obtained inception due to a joint planning effort between the City of Chula Vista, the Port of San Diego, and Pacifica Companies - the private developer with an option to acquire land in the area. The master plan study area includes approximately 550 acres (2.2 km^{2}) of land and water, generally bounded by the Sweetwater Marsh National Wildlife Refuge to the north, San Diego Bay to the west, Bay Boulevard to the east, and the South Bay Power Plant and switchyard sites to the south. The bayfront has been categorized into three distinctly different sub districts for planning purposes and from north to south they are: the Sweetwater District, the Harbor District, and the Otay District.

=== Development proposals ===
In July 2007, an emergency press conference was called by Mayor Cheryl Cox regarding an ongoing dispute between labor organizations and Gaylord Entertainment, the Tennessee-based company that was originally contracted to do the job. The event was attended by many Chula Vista notables, most of whom spoke in favor of Gaylord. To the dismay of Chula Vista and the Port of San Diego the deal fell through. The City of Chula Vista is now in bayfront-redevelopment talks with other local developers, while at the same time attempting to lure Gaylord back to the South Bay.

The Port of San Diego and the Chula Vista City Council concluded a term sheet for a land swap between the Port and Pacifica Companies. Pacifica Companies sought to swap 97 acres (390,000 m^{2}) of land just near the Chula Vista Nature Center for 35 acres (140,000 m^{2}) of land further south and just east of the marina, due to the land near the Chula Vista Nature Center being environmentally sensitive. Pacifica plans to build a 250-room hotel and a 1,500-unit condominium project on the site.

=== Development ===
In mid-May 2010, development was given the go ahead when the Port, Chula Vista City Council, the City's Redevelopment Corporation, and the Chula Vista Planning Commission went through with actions that obtained necessary local approval prior to the consideration of state agencies. The development of the project will create upwards of 2,000 permanent jobs and more than 6,000 temporary construction jobs. Upon completion, the bayfront is estimated to generate $1.3 billion for the regional economy. The last obstacle in a 38-year effort to develop the bayfront, approval from the California State Lands Commission and the California Coastal Commission is needed.

=== Approved projects ===
In April 2018, a $1 billion+ hotel and convention center was approved, with the Chula Vista and Port of San Diego paying $343 million in cost, and waiving leasing cost for nearly four decades (a $245 million value).

== Design ==
The land-use plans were shaped by extensive public input and include more than 200 acres (0.81 km^{2}) for a new signature park, habitat viewing areas, bikeways, pedestrian paths and public plazas. New development will include hotels, conference facilities, waterfront specialty shops, cultural attractions, condominium housing, and employment centers. The plans illustrate an expanded marina with an open water area for active boating and a re-aligned boating channel within San Diego Bay. This plan reflects the similar appearance of many bayfront and oceanfront locations in the northern bay area and Coronado.

The Chula Vista Bayfront Master Plan was designed by the urban design firm of Cooper, Robertson & Partners, headquartered in New York City. For visualization purposes, “before and after” digital renderings of the bayfront were created. Pacifica Companies also developed preliminary architectural concepts for the condominium homes planned to be located both east of the harbor and south of J Street.
