= San Elijo College =

Coordinates: 33.1022°N 117.2024°W

- Established: 2009
- President: Tim Mosteller
- Location: San Elijo Hills, San Marcos, California, United States
- Website: http://www.sanelijocollege.org/

San Elijo College was a private, four year college in San Marcos, California. It admitted its first class in 2010.

== Academic profile ==
One of several colleges which follow the general educational style of St. John's College, San Elijo College was merely Christian and committed to the Nicene Creed as its foundational theological documents. As a classical college, the college was also committed to the seven liberal arts, which composed a large component of the curriculum.

Each San Elijo student took courses in the grammar, logic, rhetoric, mathematics, geometry, music, and astronomy. They also read and studied the traditional works of western culture. The objective of San Elijo College was to bring in students and faculty with an open mind, diverse background, and a strong commitment to classical education.

== History ==
Tim Mosteller founded San Elijo College and registered it as a nonprofit corporation with the Internal Revenue Service in 2009, organized a board and was recruiting students. However, the California Secretary of State suspended the college's operations in January 2014, the last season the college posted a curriculum on its website. That March, the Secretary of State allowed the college to resume but suspended it again in December 2017. The college dissolved as a corporation in September 2020.
