= Regions of the San Diego metropolitan area =

The Regions of the San Diego metropolitan area and San Diego County, as they cover the same area are:

- The Anza Borrego, or Desert or Inland region, includes all of northeastern San Diego County, including Borrego Springs and the portion of the Sonoran Colorado Desert within the county. The region consists predominantly of Anza Borrego Desert State Park, the largest state park in California. and occupies all of San Diego County east of the Peninsular Ranges with the exception of the Mountain Empire.
- Central, or Central San Diego, includes most of the city of San Diego, often together with Coronado, excluding South San Diego. It may or may not include northern communities within the city of San Diego.
- Cuyamaca, (Kumeyaay: 'Ekwiiyemak) is a region of eastern San Diego County. It lies east of the Capitan Grande Indian Reservation in the Cuyamaca Mountains and western Laguna Mountains, north of Descanso and south of Julian. Named for the 1845 Rancho Cuyamaca Mexican land grant, the region is now dominated by the 26,000 acres (105.2 km^{2}) Cuyamaca Rancho State Park. Within the park is the prominent Cuyamaca Peak, the second-highest mountain in San Diego County at 6,512 feet (1,984.9 m).
- East County most always includes cities and communities east of the city of San Diego. Due to varying definitions, it may or may not include eastern backcountry areas.
- The Mountain Empire includes communities along California State Route 94 and Interstate 8, in the southeastern Laguna Mountains region of the county. It may or may not be included in East County.
- North County is divided into Coastal and Inland communities. It includes all cities and communities north of the city limits of San Diego and all cities and communities - including and to the west of - Ramona and San Diego Country Estates. According to some definitions, it may or may not include northern communities within the city of San Diego.
- South Bay or South County includes all cities and communities at the southern end of San Diego Bay including South San Diego. Coronado is included in the South County definition that also includes South Bay.

== Consistency ==
None of these regions has an accepted defined area, and the borders will vary depending on the source. Some backcountry communities such as Julian, Pine Valley, and Borrego Springs are not always placed into any particular region due to their isolation and distance from major urban centers, although the San Diego Association of Governments puts them within the East County Major Statistical Area. (Note: The SANDAG Major Statistical Area named East County is further divided into four subregional areas - Palomar-Julian, Laguna-Pine Valley, Mountain Empire, and Anza-Borrego - and five community planning areas - North Mountain, Julian, Central Mountain, Mountain Empire, and Desert; thought it excludes East Suburban, another MSA commonly thought of as East County)
