= Buena Vista Lagoon =

Lake in United States of America

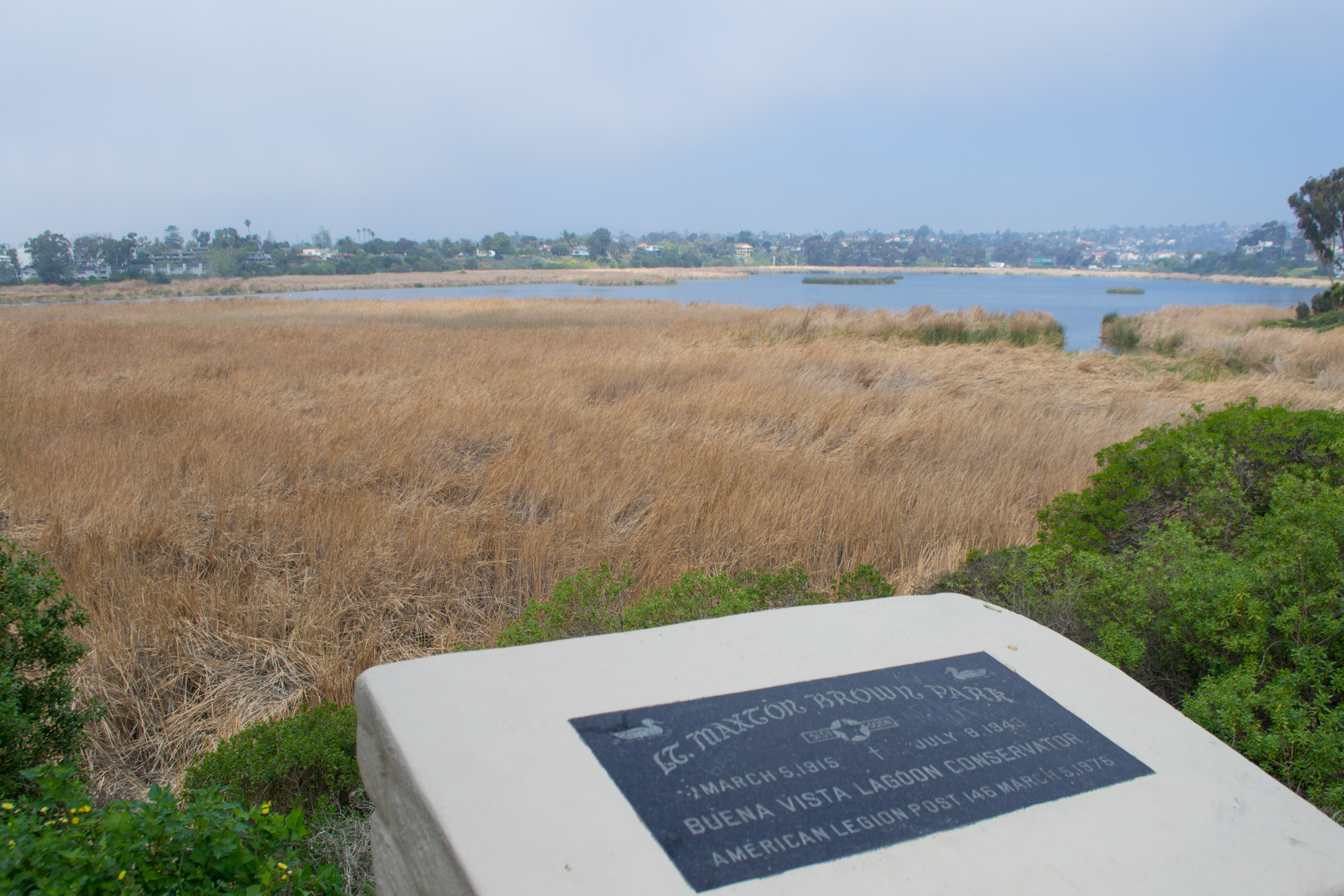
- A marker at Buena Vista Lagoon

- Location within California
- Location: San Diego County, California
- Coordinates: 33.1696660°N 117.3531612°W
- Type: Inlet
- Primary outflows: Pacific Ocean
- Surface area: 223 acres (90 ha)
- Surface elevation: 0 ft (0 m)
- Settlements: Carlsbad; Oceanside
- References: GNIS

Buena Vista Lagoon is a freshwater lagoon adjacent to the Pacific Ocean in the South Coast region of Southern California within the North County region of San Diego County. The lagoon covers 223 acres of wetland habitat and serves as a geographic border between Carlsbad and Oceanside.

Buena Vista Lagoon is managed by the California Department of Fish and Wildlife. It is home to the Buena Vista Audubon Society Nature Center, and is California's first Ecological Reserve. Two non-profit organizations are committed to the preservation and management of the lagoon: the Buena Vista Audubon Society and the Buena Vista Lagoon Foundation

== Flora and fauna ==
The lagoon harbors at least 103 bird species, 18 mammals, and 14 amphibians and reptiles. Buena Vista also serves as a valuable wetland habitat for migrating bird species during the fall months. In the 1970s, the lagoon was home to a group of pink flamingos that locals believed escaped from the San Diego Zoo, but the zoo steadfastly denied that they were missing any flamingos.

A weir exists about 100 yards from the ocean. Depending on the season and rainfall, there may be outflow into the Pacific Ocean.

There has been discussion on whether to maintain Buena Vista Lagoon as freshwater or to open it to the ocean, allowing saltwater mixing much as with the nearby Agua Hedionda Lagoon. As of early 2018, no definitive plans have been set to change the lagoon, however.
