= Jack Keever =

American journalist (c.1938–2004)

Jack Keever (c. 1938 – July 18, 2004) was an American journalist and author, best known for his coverage of Charles Whitman's 1966 shooting spree.

== Personal ==
Keever collected books and memorabilia that were associated with the history of Texas. In his free time, he volunteered as a member of the author-selection committee for the Texas Book Festival.

=== Education ===
Keever graduated from the University of Texas at Austin in 1960. He later received his master's degree in journalism.

== Career ==
Keever began his career as the managing editor of The Daily Texan in 1959. He joined the Associated Press in 1961, where he would remain for thirty years. In addition to his coverage of the tower shooting, he also wrote sports columns for the University of Texas Longhorns, as well as local legislative sessions and governor's races. After transferring to the AP's Austin bureau, he reviewed articles before they were distributed through the wire service. In 1992, he retired from The Associated Press. He then later taught courses in journalism at Austin Community College until 2000.

=== Books ===
He also wrote several books, and was co-author of a biography of John Connally, called "Portrait in Power".

=== Awards ===
Keever received a number of awards, which include:

- 6 Charles E. Green journalism awards
- Honorable mention in the Paul Tobenkin Memorial Award for Columbia University
- 2000– Excellence in teaching from the National Institute for Staff and Organizational Development

== Death ==
Keever died from cancer at the age of 66 at his home in Austin, Texas.

== Family ==
Keever was married to his wife Cynthia Keever and together they had a son and daughter, Erin and Graham.
