= Scott Erskine =

American serial killer

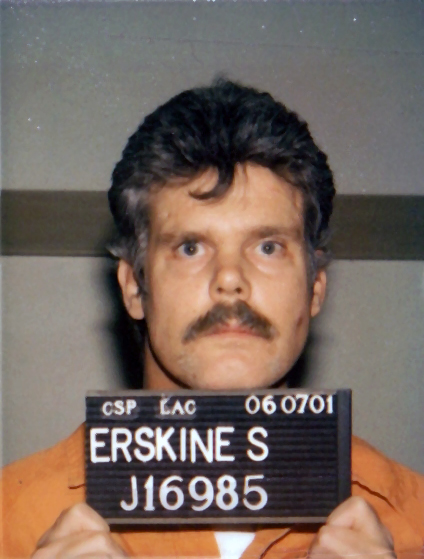
- Erskine in a 2001 prison photograph
- Born: December 22, 1962; San Diego, California, U.S.
- Died: July 3, 2020 (aged 57); San Quentin, California, U.S.
- Status: Deceased
- Convictions: California; First degree murder with special circumstances (2 counts); Kidnapping; Rape; Forced oral copulation with a firearm (3 counts); Penetration with a foreign object Possession of a firearm by a convicted felon Florida; Second degree murder
- Penalty: California; Death; Florida; Life imprisonment

Details
- Victims: 3+
- Span of crimes: 1972 – March 27, 1993
- Country: United States
- States: Florida and California
- Date apprehended: 1993

Scott Thomas Erskine (December 22, 1962 – July 3, 2020) was an American serial killer on California's death row, convicted in 2003 for the 1993 murder of two California boys. He was incarcerated at San Quentin State Prison.

In 2020, Erskine became one of a dozen California death row inmates to die in the span of less than two months as the result of a COVID-19 outbreak at San Quentin State Prison. He died on the same day as fellow death row inmate Manuel Machado Alvarez, who also died from COVID-19.

== Early life ==
Erskine grew up in Southern California. When he was five years old, Erskine darted into traffic on the Pacific Coast Highway in Long Beach and was hit by a station wagon. He remained in a coma for 60 hours. Although physically he appeared recovered, he frequently complained to his mother about headaches, and he experienced "black-out" moments where he could not remember what he was last doing. At the age of 10, he started molesting his 6-year-old sister, forcing her to perform oral sex upon him.

Erskine soon began raping his friends, threatening to kill them if they told anybody. Erskine attended Southwest Junior High School in San Diego, California and was placed in "special classes" for the emotionally disturbed. At 15, Erskine escaped from a juvenile detention facility, pulled a knife on a 13-year-old girl and raped her. The next morning, he assaulted a 27-year-old female jogger with a knife.

In 1980, while on his way to interview for a camp counselor's position, Erskine beat a 14-year-old boy unconscious during an attempted rape. He also raped another inmate while imprisoned. Erskine begged the San Diego judge at the time to spare him from adult prison. Despite his mother's pleas to send her son to a mental institution, Erskine was sentenced to four years in prison; he was paroled in 1984.

In 1993, Erskine invited a woman, who was waiting for the bus, into his home and held her hostage for several days, repeatedly raping and sodomizing her before letting her go. He was quickly arrested. He was convicted of multiple charges, including rape and kidnapping, and sentenced to 70 years in prison. As a convicted sex offender, Erskine had to submit his DNA to a database.

In March 2001, the San Diego Cold Case squad reopened the investigation of the unsolved 1993 murders of nine-year-old Jonathan Sellers and 13-year-old Charlie Keever. The police tested cotton swabs taken from Keever's mouth at the time of death, that contained semen. The DNA sample was entered into CODIS, and was matched to Erskine.

== The trial ==
In September 2003, Erskine went on trial for the two murders. The jurors were shown photos of the crime scene: Sellers was at the entrance of the makeshift fort hanging from a castor bean tree branch. He was naked from the waist down, his legs and arms bound with rope, and his mouth gagged. His genitals showed obvious signs of sexual assault, and a noose was tied around his neck.

On the ground lay Keever, his head resting on a pile of his and Sellers' clothes. He was also naked from the waist down, legs and arms bound, his mouth gagged, and his genitals were bleeding from extensive bite marks. He, too, had a rope around his neck. The pathologist determined Charlie Keever was alive when the bite marks were inflicted. Erskine's DNA was also found on two cigarette butts found near the bodies.

Erskine's public defender never denied Erskine killed the boys, but instead focused on Erskine's car accident when he was 5 years old. The public defender stated that Erskine received serious brain injuries that diminished his capacity to differentiate between right and wrong. They argued that life without the possibility of parole was a more appropriate punishment.

On October 1, 2003, the jury found Erskine guilty of murder; however, they could not agree on the sentence. Eleven jurors voted for the death penalty, while one juror voted for life without parole. The judge declared a mistrial on the penalty phase.

In April 2004 Erskine went before a second jury to decide his punishment for the murder. This jury returned a verdict of death. On September 1, 2004, a California judge affirmed the jury's verdict and sentenced Erskine to death. He was transported to San Quentin six days later.

== Florida murder ==
While awaiting the start of his trial, Florida investigators matched Erskine's DNA in the unsolved case of 26-year-old Renee Baker, who was murdered on June 23, 1989. He was formally charged in 2003, and was sentenced in August 2004. Erskine, who lived in Palm Beach County, Florida, at the time, admitted to raping and killing Baker and pleaded guilty to second degree murder. He was sentenced to life without parole.

Baker drowned when Erskine broke her neck and left her near the bank of the Intracoastal Waterway in Palm Beach. Florida authorities suspect Erskine may be linked to other unsolved homicides.

== Death ==
Erskine died on July 3, 2020, after contracting COVID-19 during the COVID-19 pandemic in California. He was 57. Erskine died on the same day as fellow death row inmate Manuel Machado Alvarez, who also died from COVID-19. Both of them had been hospitalized before their deaths.

== See also ==
- List of serial killers in the United States
