= Manuel Machado Alvarez =

Cuban murderer

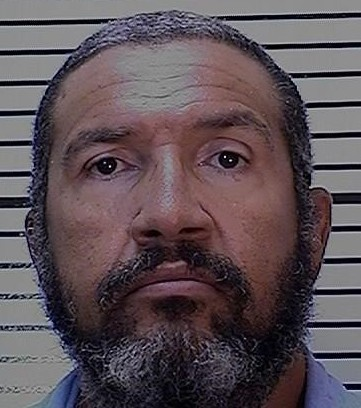
- Machado in 2018
- Born: 1960; Cuba
- Died: July 3, 2020 (aged 59); San Quentin, California, United States
- Status: Deceased
- Convictions: First degree murder with special circumstances Voluntary manslaughter with a deadly weapon Rape with a deadly weapon Robbery with a deadly weapon Attempted robbery with a deadly weapon Assault with a deadly weapon Escape
- Penalty: Death

Details
- Victims: Pedro Ramirez, 21; Allen Ray Birkman, 35
- Date: December 27, 1981; May 17, 1987
- Country: United States
- State: California

Manuel Machado Alvarez (1960 – July 3, 2020) was a Cuban murderer who was sentenced to death in California. In 1987, while on parole for voluntary manslaughter, he murdered a man during a robbery, a crime for which he was sentenced to die.

In 2020, Machado became one of a dozen California death row inmates to die in the span of less than two months as the result of a COVID-19 outbreak at San Quentin State Prison. He died on the same day as Scott Erskine, who also died from COVID-19.

== Early life ==
Machado was born in Cuba in 1960. As a child, he suffered a serious head injury, which may have contributed to what may have been epilepsy. His mother died when he was young, and his stepmother was abusive and neglectful. Machado began to exhibit problematic behavior.

Machado arrived in the United States in the Mariel boatlift in 1980. After initially being detained at several camps, he went to Richmond, Virginia, in 1981, under the sponsorship of a married couple with young children. He lived with the family for about two months, and displayed mixed behavior of both kindness and anger.

Machado moved to California in late 1981, where he would later commit his crimes. He struggled to assimilate into life in a different country, but was able to make a few friends.

== Crimes ==
On December 27, 1981, 21-year-old Pedro Ramirez ran into a liquor store in Hollywood, Los Angeles. Machado was chasing him with a butcher knife. Ramirez stopped and put his hands up to protect himself. With his other hand, Machado pulled Ramirez's hands down, said "Chinga su madre" ("Fuck your mother, motherfucker"), fatally stabbed him through the throat, and withdrew the blade. Machado then approached one of the store's clerks, but fled when the man pulled out a shotgun and told him to stop. Manuel later said he killed Ramirez out of revenge for him burglarizing the house of his male lover.

Machado was convicted of voluntary manslaughter with a deadly weapon and assault with a deadly weapon and sentenced to four years in prison. In December 1982, he escaped from a maximum security prison with two other Spanish-speaking inmates. They surrendered several hours later, and each of their sentences were extended by 16 months. Machado was paroled in 1986.

In March 1987, in violation of his parole, Machado moved from Los Angeles to Sacramento. There, he lived on and off with Leslie Colyer and Neetelfer Hawkins, his friend. Machado spent most of his time using drugs and drinking alcohol.

On May 12, 1987, a drunk Machado made sexual advances toward Sandra S., a local sex worker, near her apartment building late at night. Sandra rejected his advances, then returned to her room and went to sleep. She awoke at noon. Having a "real bad feeling", Sandra looked forward to see Machado masturbating at the foot of her bed. She called for her boyfriend's help, but neither he nor Sandra's son were home. Machado started raping Sandra when Percy Spence, one of her friends, walked in. Spence asked her if she was having a date. Sandra said no, but Machado said yes, prompting Sandra to keep saying no. Spence became confused and left. By the time another one of Sandra's friends, Anthony Simpkins, arrived, Machado had finished raping her. As Simpkins was entering, he passed Spence. When Simpkins asked him what was happening, Spence replied "Oh, just let it be." Sandra ran to Simpkins and said Machado had raped her, prompting him to flee. He stole the nearby car of one of his acquaintances, Edwin Glidewell, and drove off.

On May 15, Machado met a woman named Belinda Denise Ross as she was cashing a welfare check. They became acquainted, got in the car together, and, over the next few days, set out to obtain drugs and alcohol.

On May 17, Machado had Ross drive to an office of the Golden 1 Credit Union, where he got out. Around this time, 35-year-old Allen Ray Birkman, a technician for the Sacramento Police Department, withdrew money from his wife's account at an ATM. Machado approached Birkman and the two got into a struggle. Machado stabbed him in the heart and fled the scene with Ross. Before Birkman was taken to a hospital, he gave a description of Machado. He died from his injuries the following day.

Later that day, Machado and Ross drove to the apartment of Gail Patton, one of Ross's friends. The two entered the apartment, with Ross holding the knife. She wiped the knife and had Patton give it to Machado. Shortly after, police officers arrived at Patton's apartment. Machado and Ross told Patton not to say anything. The officers told Patton they were investigating the stabbing at the Golden 1 Credit Union and asked her if she knew anything about the car used by the perpetrators. She said no and the police left. Patton then told Machado that he needed to leave. Machado left, leaving behind the knife and the car. Ross did not go with him, and she was arrested several days later.

Not long after leaving the house, Machado robbed and assaulted 78-year-old Greta Slatten. Slatten had driven to a store with no cars in the parking lot and no people present outside, other than Machado. She stayed in her car with doors locked until Machado appeared to walk to a payphone. When Slatten passed by Machado, he knocked her unconscious before stealing her car and purse. He was arrested in Mississippi on May 27, after a high-speed chase. His passenger, Charles Robinson, was also arrested. Machado was soon returned to California to face criminal charges, including murder. While awaiting trial, he punched fellow inmates on two different occasions. These assaults were used against him at the sentencing phase of his trial.

== Trial ==
Machado was charged with first degree murder with special circumstances, rape, robbery, and attempted robbery, while Ross was charged with first degree murder and attempted robbery. The two were tried jointly in 1989, with the prosecution seeking a death sentence for Machado.

At trial, Machado denied everything. He said he had consensual sex with Sandra and that Glidewell's car was given to him as debt security. He proclaimed his innocence in Birkman's murder, saying he was mistakenly identified. Ross admitted being the getaway driver in Birkman's murder, but denied knowing that Machado was going to rob and kill him.

On June 9, 1989, Machado was found guilty on all counts. Ross was only convicted of attempted robbery and being an accessory to murder after the fact. She received a sentence of 3 years and 8 months, and an additional 5 years as a serious felony enhancement due to a prior robbery conviction. She was released from prison in the 1990s.

During the sentencing phase for Machado, the prosecution pointed to his prior convictions and history of violence as aggravating factors. Machado's defense team discussed his troubled upbringing and gave examples of times when he'd shown kindness, including positive interactions he had with Neetelfer Hawkins.

On August 3, 1989, the jury returned a verdict of death against Machado. He was formally sentenced to death on September 14, 1989. Birkman's family, who gave victim impact statements in court, were mostly indifferent to the question over whether Machado should be executed, saying all that mattered to them is that he die in prison. Machado was sent to death row at San Quentin State Prison.

== Death ==
Machado died on July 3, 2020, at the age of 59, after contracting COVID-19 during the COVID-19 pandemic in California. He died on the same day as fellow death row inmate Scott Erskine, who also died from COVID-19. Both of them had been hospitalized before their deaths.
