= De Luz Heights, California =

Unincorporated community in California, United States

- Unincorporated community
- Location within California
- Coordinates: 33°25′52″N 117°16′36″W
- Country: United States
- State: California
- County: San Diego
- Elevation: 1,299 ft (396 m)
- Time zone: UTC-8 (Pacific (PST))
  - Summer (DST): UTC-7 (PDT)
- Postal code: 92028
- Area codes: 442/760
- GNIS feature ID: 1868370

De Luz Heights (De Luz, Spanish for "Of Light") is an unincorporated community that is in northwestern San Diego County, California, United States.

== Geography ==
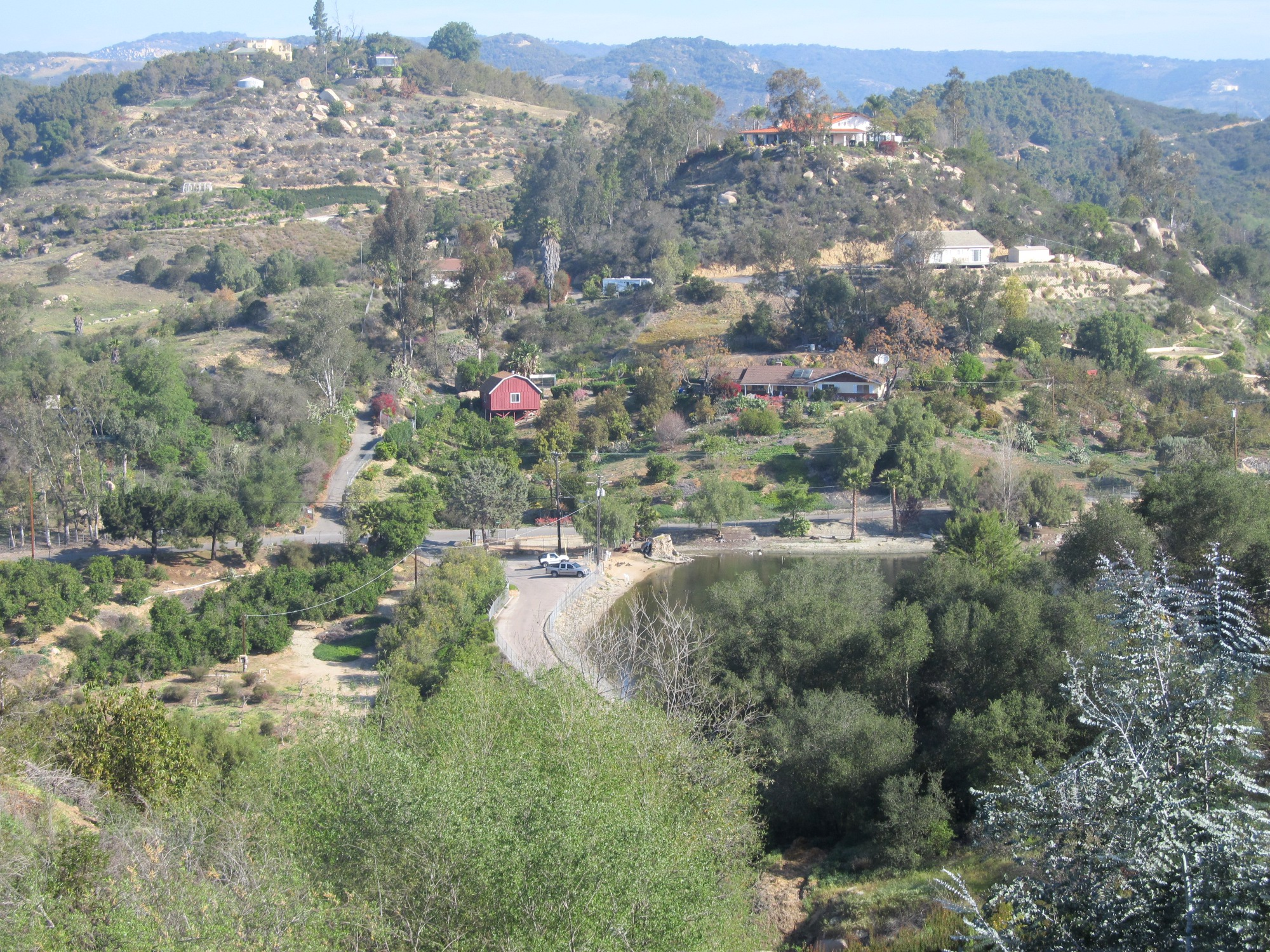
View north of De Luz Heights and Ross Lake.

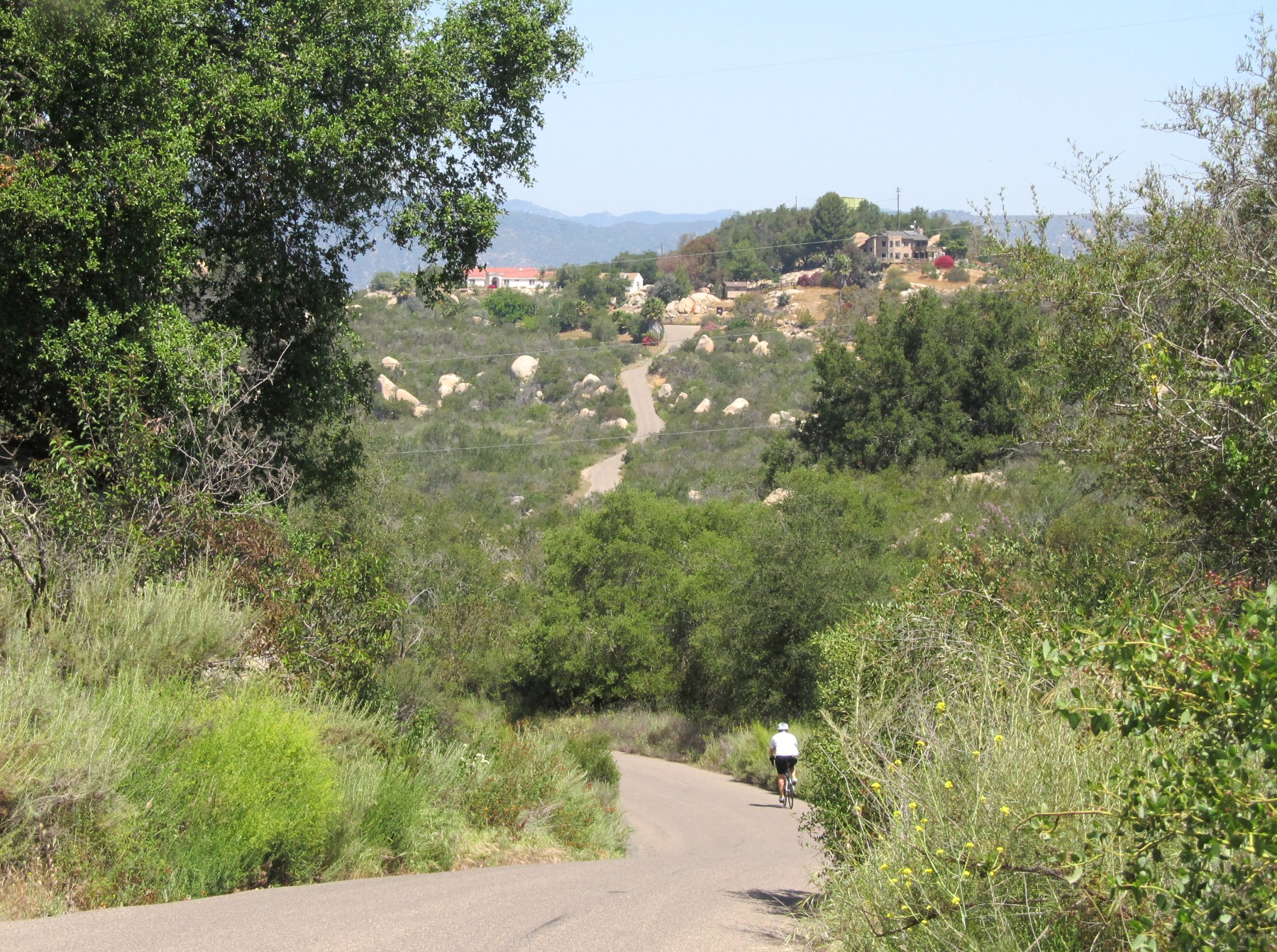
View north of De Luz Heights Road, to its terminus at Big Rock Ranch.

De Luz Heights is on the Santa Rosa Plateau of the Santa Ana Mountains. It is between De Luz Road to the west and Sandia Creek Drive to the east. It is northwest of Fallbrook, southwest of Temecula, and immediately east of Marine Corps Base Camp Pendleton.

De Luz Heights is an agricultural community with narrow country lanes lined by avocado groves, commercial flower nurseries, citrus ranches, and vineyards.

== See also ==
- Santa Rosa Plateau Ecological Reserve
