= Murders of Charlie Keever and Jonathan Sellers =

1993 murders in San Diego County, California, US

- Location: Otay River, Imperial Beach, San Diego County, California
- Date: March 27, 1993
- Attack type: Child molestation, torture, and murder
- Weapon: Rope
- Deaths: 2
- Victims: Charlie Keever; Jonathan Sellers
- Motive: Sexual
- Verdict: Guilty (September 1, 2004)
- Convictions: 2 counts of first-degree murder
- Convicted: Scott Erskine

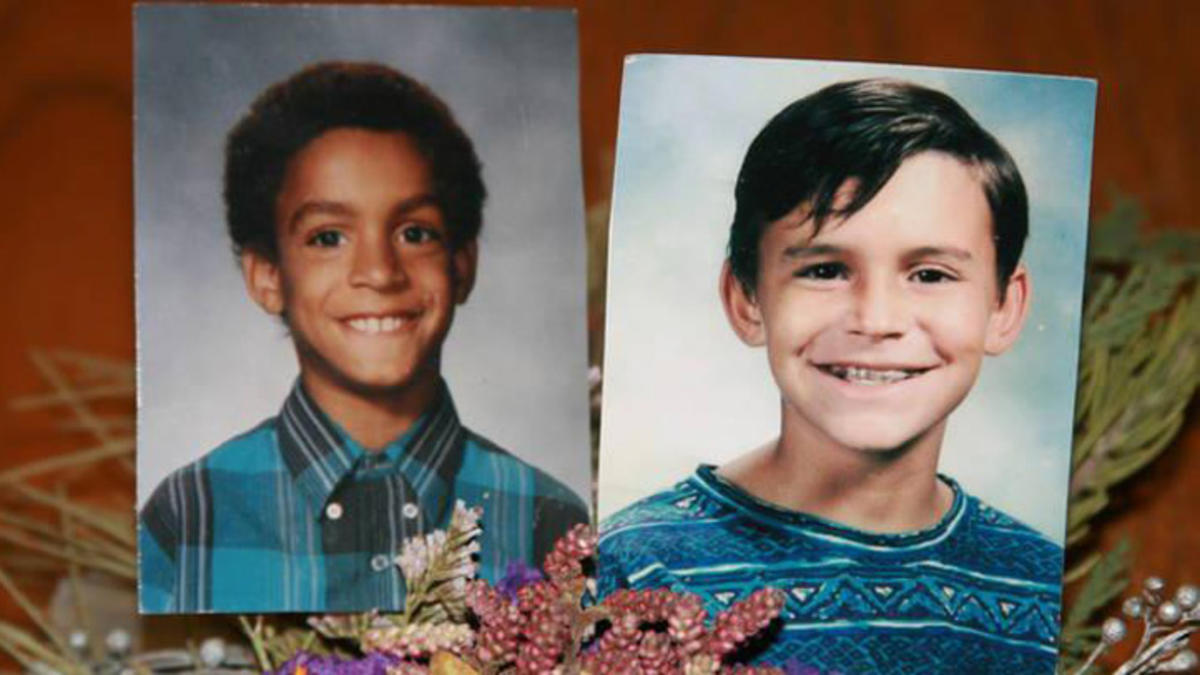
Sellers and Keever

The murders of Charlie Keever and Jonathan Sellers took place on March 27, 1993, in San Diego County, California. The rape and murders were solved via DNA match eight years after their deaths.

== The victims ==
Charles Allen "Charlie" Keever (November 1, 1979 – March 27, 1993) was a 13-year-old boy, the youngest of three children, siblings, Lisa Keever and Michael Keever. Charlie's parents are David Keever and Maria Keever. His father and two grandparents died before Charlie's murderer was discovered.

Jonathan Lee "Jon" Sellers (April 18, 1983 – March 27, 1993) was 9 years old, the fourth of six children, two minutes younger than his twin sister, Jennifer. His older half-brother, Alton Williams II, later became a cast member on The Real World: Las Vegas. His other siblings are Natasha Sellers, Dennis Michael Sellers and Tammie R. Sellers. Jonathan's parents are Dennis L. Sellers and Milena M. Sellers.

Both boys were buried at Holy Cross Catholic Cemetery in Chollas View, San Diego.

== The crime ==
On March 27, 1993, Charlie Keever and Jonathan Sellers' elder brother, 13-year-old Alton Williams, decided to spend the day bike riding. However, a last-minute change of plans resulted in Alton staying behind and Jonathan joining Charlie instead. Jennifer, Jonathan's twin sister, also wanted to go along but Jonathan said he did not want a girl tagging along so Milena Sellers, Jonathan's mother, told Jennifer to let the boys enjoy the day and she could go next time; Jennifer remained at home.

Around noon, Jonathan and Charlie departed on their 20-inch royal-blue bicycles and went to Rally's (a local fast-food restaurant) in the Imperial Beach neighborhood of San Diego. Afterward, they went to a nearby pet store and played with some of the dogs and cats, chatting with the manager and customers. After leaving the pet store, the boys were never seen alive again.

Police surmise that the boys were lured along the Otay River in Imperial Beach where they were molested and killed.

On March 29, 1993, Charlie and Jonathan's bodies were discovered by a bike rider 10 yards from their bikes in overgrown brush on the west bank of the Otay River. Charlie was on the ground, his head on top of his and Jonathan's clothing. His genitals were bloody and showed extensive bite marks. The autopsy report concluded he was alive when the bite marks were inflicted on him. Tissue samples found in Charlie's mouth eventually proved to contain the killer's DNA.

Jonathan was found hanging by a rope from a castor bean tree. His legs and arms were bound with rope, his mouth gagged and he was naked from the waist down. A rope was wrapped tightly around his neck and his genitals were damaged.

== Crime solved via DNA ==
In March 2001, a DNA database identified Scott Erskine as a suspect, based on the DNA found at the scene of the 1993 murders. Erskine was already in prison for a rape committed six months after the boys' murders.

In 2003, Erskine went to trial on the charges of two counts of murder with the special allegations of sodomy, oral copulation, child molestation and torture and three counts of special circumstances: torture, sexual assault and multiple murders. He was found guilty.

During the penalty phase of the trial, one juror did not want to give Erskine the death penalty, so the judge declared a mistrial for the penalty phase portion of the trial.

In April 2004, a new jury convened voted unanimously for the death penalty. On September 1, 2004, a California judge sentenced Erskine to death and he was sent to San Quentin State Prison. Erskine died of COVID-19 complications on July 3, 2020, while incarcerated.
