= San Elijo Hills, San Marcos, California =

Coordinates: 33°06′N 117°11′W

San Elijo Hills, California
- Planned community of San Marcos, CA
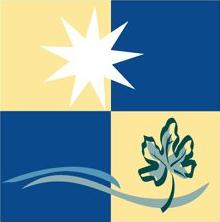
- Flag
- Interactive map of San Elijo Hills, California
- Country: United States
- State: California
- County: San Diego
- City: San Marcos

Area
  - Total: 1,921 acres (777 ha)
- Time zone: PST
  - Summer (DST): PDT
- ZIP code: 92078
- Area codes: 760, 442
- Website: http://www.sanelijohills.com/

San Elijo Hills is a master-planned community in the southwest of San Marcos, California, built by San Elijo Hills Development Company, and managed by HomeFed Corporation. San Elijo is home to three of the largest schools in San Marcos Unified School District. Unlike the rest of San Marcos, San Elijo Hills has its own town center, featuring a public park (including a stage and seating for community events), a clock tower, a fountain, and rows of shops and restaurants.

== Etymology ==
In 1769, the Portola Expedition named the area San Alejo in honor of Saint Alexius. The term "Elijo" is an Anglo-Saxon misspelling of a proper name "Alejo."

== Timeline ==
- 1994 - 1,921 acres (3.002 sq mi) San Elijo Hills property purchased by The San Elijo Hills Development Company, planning commenced.
- 1997 - Overall plan approved by the San Marcos City Council.
- 2004 - San Elijo Middle School opened, with the elementary and middle schools sharing facilities for two years, until the completion of the elementary school.
- 2004 - San Elijo Park, a 19 acres (77,000 m^{2}) city park, opened.
- 2004 - Peace Monument installed at the eastern entrance to the community's town square on September 11.
- 2006 - San Elijo Elementary School completed.
- 2008 - Fire station opened in San Elijo Hills.
- 2009 - MarketWalk, a residential/retail project in the town center, opened.
- 2009 - Double Peak Park opened.
- 2016 - Double Peak K-8 school opened.

== Education ==
=== San Marcos Unified School District ===
- San Elijo Middle School
- San Elijo Elementary School
- San Marcos High School
- Double Peak K-8 School

=== California State University, San Marcos ===
San Elijo Hills is served by California State University, San Marcos, located in San Marcos.

== Culture ==
=== Events ===
The San Elijo Hills Homeowners Association organizes a number of community events, including a golf outing, Concert in the Square, Oktoberfest, Tree Lighting Ceremony, Independence Day Celebration, and Easter Egg Hunt.

== Recreation ==
=== Parks ===
==== Double Peak Park ====
Double Peak Park features a 150-seat concrete, terraced amphitheater for interpretive ranger talks, a group picnic shelter, individual picnic tables, an adventure play area, restrooms, a resident park ranger, and a parking lot.

==== San Elijo Hills Park ====
San Elijo Hills Park includes a soccer field, two baseball diamonds, picnic/barbecue areas, a children's water "sprayground", an enclosed dog park, jogging paths, and a plaza for large events. The park is also the main trailhead for a network of 18 miles (29 km) of trails. The park's Community Center, operated by the city of San Marcos, has facilities for classes, parties and special events.

=== Trails ===
San Elijo Hills has 18 miles (29 km) of trails that are popular for hiking, cycling and horseback riding.

=== AYSO Region 1505 ===
AYSO Region 1505 is a volunteer-run youth soccer program in San Elijo Hills and the surrounding communities. The organization fielded 75 teams with more than 600 players in 2010.
