= Coleman (surname) =

Coleman is a surname of Irish and English origin. The Irish surname is derived from the Irish Ó Colmáin, Ó Clumhain, or Mac Colmáin. The English surname is an occupational name denoting a burner of charcoal, or possibly a servant of a person named Cole.

Notable people with the surname include:

== A ==
- A. E. Coleman, African-American discoverer of gold in Julian, California
- Ada Coleman (1875–1966), English longtime head bartender at the Savoy Hotel
- Adam Coleman (born 1991), Australian rugby union player
- Alan Coleman (1936–2013), English-born television writer, director and producer
- Alan Coleman (cricketer) (born 1983), English cricketer
- Ann Crittenden Coleman (1813–1891), American author, translator
- Anthony Coleman (born 1955), American jazz pianist
- Asa Coleman (c. 1830s–after 1893), African-American politician and former slave

== B ==
- Baoan Coleman (1939–2025), Vietnamese-born American actor
- Barry Coleman, state legislator in Arkansas
- Bessie Coleman (1892–1926), American aviator
- Blake Coleman, (born 1991), American ice hockey player
- Brandon Coleman (wide receiver), (born 1992), American football wide receiver
- Brandon Coleman (offensive lineman) (born 2000), American football offensive tackle

== C ==
- Cam Coleman (born 2006), American football player
- Catherine Coleman (born 1960), American astronaut
- Chad L. Coleman (born 1966/1967), American actor
- Charles Coleman (disambiguation)
- Charlotte Coleman (1968–2001), English actress
- Chase Coleman (born 1985), American actor, director, writer and musician
- Chaz Coleman (born 2006), American football player
- Chloe Coleman (born 2008), American actress
- Choo-Choo Coleman (1937–2016), American baseball catcher
- Chris Coleman (disambiguation)
- Chuck Coleman (1962 or 1963–2024), American aviator, aerospace engineer and test pilot
- Clive Coleman (born 1961), English lawyer, journalist and comedy writer
- Corey Coleman (born 1994), American football player
- Corrine Grad Coleman (1927–2004), American writer and women's rights activist
- Craig Coleman (born 1963), Australian rugby league footballer
- Cy Coleman (1929–2004), American composer, songwriter and jazz pianist

== D ==
- Dabney Coleman (1932–2024), American actor
- Daisy Coleman (1997–2020), American sexual abuse victim advocate
- D'Alton Corry Coleman (1879–1956), Canadian businessman and president of the Canadian Pacific Railway
- David Coleman (disambiguation)
- Davon Coleman (born 1991), American football player
- Derrick Coleman (born 1967), pro basketball player
- Des Coleman (born 1965), British actor and presenter
- Diane Coleman (1953–2024), American lawyer and disability rights advocate
- Dominic Coleman (born 1970), British actor
- D. C. Coleman (1920–1995), British economic historian
- Don Coleman (musician), Canadian rock singer
- Don Coleman (linebacker) (born 1952), American football player and entrepreneur
- Don Coleman (offensive tackle) (1928–2017), American football player
- D. Jackson Coleman (born 1934), American doctor and inventor
- Donald Coleman (1925–1991), British politician
- Doriane Lambelet Coleman, Swiss-born American law professor
- Doug Coleman, American politician
- Dylan Coleman (born 1996), American baseball player

== E ==
- Earl Coleman (singer) (1925–1995), American jazz singer
- Eli Coleman (born 1948), American sexologist
- Eliot Coleman (born 1938), American farmer, author, agricultural researcher and educator
- Eric Coleman (defensive back) (born 1966), American former football player

== F ==
- Fred Coleman (born 1975), American football player

== G ==
- Garnet Coleman (1961–2026), American politician
- Gary Coleman (1968–2010), American actor
- Gary B.B. Coleman (1947–1994), American blues guitarist, singer, songwriter and record producer
- Geoff Coleman (footballer) (born 1936), English footballer
- George Coleman (disambiguation)
- Gerald Coleman (born 1985), American ice hockey goalkeeper
- Greg Coleman (American football) (born 1954), American football player

== H ==
- Helena Coleman (1860–1953), Canadian poet, music teacher, and writer
- Herb Coleman (disambiguation)

== I ==
- Iain Coleman (1958–2025), British Member of Parliament
- Itoro Coleman (born 1977), American basketball coach

== J ==
- Jack Coleman (disambiguation)
- Jacqueline Coleman (born 1982), American educator, politician and Lieutenant Governor of Kentucky
- James Coleman (disambiguation)
- Jamie Coleman (born 1975), American football player
- Jamye Coleman Williams (1918–2022), née Coleman, American activist and writer
- Jayda Coleman (born 2001), American softball player
- Jean Coleman (athlete) (1918–2008), Australian sprinter
- Jean Coleman (officer) (1908–1982), World War II S.O.E. agent in France
- Jean Ellen Coleman (1928–1996), American librarian
- Jenna Coleman (born 1986), English actress
- Jerry Coleman (1924–2014), baseball player and broadcaster
- Jerry "Bo" Coleman (born 1936), American radio personality
- Jermaine Coleman, better known as J. Cole (born 1985), American hip-hop artist
- Jim Coleman (journalist) (1911–2001), Canadian sports journalist, writer and press secretary
- Joe Coleman (disambiguation) or Joseph Coleman
- John Coleman (disambiguation)
- Jonah Coleman (born 2003), American football player
- Jonathan Coleman (disambiguation)

== K ==
- KaRon Coleman (born 1976), American football player
- Kelly Coleman (1938–2019), American basketball player
- Ken Coleman (1925–2003), American sports announcer
- Keon Coleman (born 2003), American football player
- Kit Coleman (1856–1915), Canadian newspaper columnist

== L ==
- Lamont Coleman, better known as Big L (1974–1999), American hip-hop artist
- Larnel Coleman (born 1998), American football player
- Lavon Coleman (born 1994), American football player
- Leonard Coleman (born 1962), American football former player
- Leonard S. Coleman Jr. (born 1949), American baseball executive
- Leslie Coleman (1878–1954), Canadian agricultural scientist in India
- Lisa Coleman (disambiguation)
- Loren Coleman (born 1947), American scientist
- Lorenzo Coleman (1975–2013), American basketball player
- L. Zenobia Coleman (1898–1999), American librarian

== M ==
- Mack Coleman (1952–1977), American basketball player
- Marie Coleman (born 1933). Australian feminist, social activist, public servant and journalist
- Margot Valerie Coleman, British judge
- Mark Coleman (born 1964), American mixed martial arts fighter
- Martin Coleman (born 1950), Irish hurler
- Martin Coleman, Jnr, his son, Irish hurler
- Mary Sue Coleman (born 1943), American scientist and educator
- Matt Coleman III (born 1998), American basketball player
- Megan Kate Coleman (born 1985), South African beauty queen
- Michael Coleman (disambiguation)
- Monique Coleman (born 1980), American actress

== N ==
- Nancy Coleman (1912–2000), American actress
- Nicholas Coleman (disambiguation) or Nick Coleman
- Noel Coleman (1919–2007), English actor
- Norm Coleman (born 1949), American politician
- Norman Jay Coleman (1827–1911), American newspaper publisher and politician
- Norris Coleman (born 1961), American basketball player

== O ==
- Ornette Coleman (1930–2015), American jazz saxophonist

== P ==
- Percy Coleman (1892–1934), Australian politician
- Peter Coleman (disambiguation)
- Phil Coleman (athlete) (1931–2021), American runner
- Phil Coleman (footballer) (born 1960), English footballer
- Priscilla Coleman (artist), court artist
- Priscilla K. Coleman, American college professor

== R ==
- Ralph Coleman (disambiguation)
- Richard Coleman (1930–2008), English actor
- Robert Coleman (disambiguation), also Bob and Bobby Coleman
- Robin R. Means Coleman (born 1969), American author, scholar and educator
- Ronald Coleman (disambiguation), also Ronnie Coleman
- Russell Coleman (born 1976), American attorney

== S ==
- Séamus Coleman (born 1988), Irish footballer
- Seth Coleman (born 2000), American football player
- Sharon L. Coleman (born 1945), American politician
- Sidney Coleman (1937–2007), American theoretical physicist
- Sidney Coleman (American football) (born 1964), American former football player
- Sophie Coleman (born 1990), British triathlete
- Stephen Coleman (born 1973), American film orchestrator
- Stephen Coleman (professor), British professor of communication
- Steve Coleman (born 1956), American saxophonist
- Steve Coleman (American football) (born 1950), American football player

== T ==
- Terry Coleman (born 1943), American politician
- Tevin Coleman (born 1993), American football player
- Thomas Coleman (disambiguation)
- Tom Coleman (disambiguation)
- Tony Coleman (born 1945), English footballer
- Townsend Coleman (born 1954), American voice actor
- Travis Coleman (born 1980), American football player

== V ==
- Vanessa Coleman, American convicted of facilitating various crimes, including murder, committed against a couple
- Vas Coleman, birth name of Yung Bans, American rapper and songwriter
- Vernell Coleman (1918–1990), community activist
- Vernon Coleman (born 1946), English conspiracy theorist
- Vince Coleman (disambiguation)
- Vincent Coleman (1900–1971), American actor

== W ==
- Wanda Coleman (1946–2013), American poet
- Warren Coleman (1901–1968), American operatic baritone
- William Coleman (disambiguation)

== X ==
- Xavier Coleman (born 1995), American football player

== Z ==
- Zendaya Coleman, better known as Zendaya (born 1996), American actress, dancer and singer

== See also ==
- General Coleman (disambiguation)
- Justice Coleman (disambiguation)
- Colman (surname)
- Coltman
- Kohlmann
- Kohlman
- Kollmann (Kollman)
- Kolman, Colmán
