= Colman (surname) =

Colman or Colmán is a surname. Notable people with the surname include:

== A ==
- Alex Colman (born 1998), Belgian racing cyclist
- Andrew Colman (born 1944), British psychologist
- Annabelle Colman (born 2004), Australian Paralympic competitor
- Arecio Colmán (born 1951), Paraguayan footballer

== B ==
- Benjamin Colman (1673–1747), American Congregationalist minister
- Blanche Colman (1884–1978), American lawyer
- Booth Colman (1923–2014), American film, television and stage actor

== C ==
- Cathy Colman, American poet
- Caroline Colman (1831–1895), English reformer, wife of Jeremiah Colman the MP
- Chanan Colman (born 1984), Danish-Israeli basketball player
- Cristian Colmán (born 1994), Paraguayan footballer
- Conrad Colman (born 1983), New Zealand-American yachtsman

== D ==
- Dan Colman (born 1990), American poker player
- David Colman (1949–2011), American neuroscientist
- Dick Colman (1914–1982), American football player and coach
- Donald Colman (1878–1942), Scottish football player and trainer
- Doug Colman (born 1973), American football player and coach

== E ==
- Eamon Colman (born 1957), Irish artist
- Eddie Colman (1936–1958), British footballer
- Edward Colman (American politician) (1828–1898), American Civil War officer and politician from Wisconsin
- Edward Colman (cinematographer) (1905–1995), American cinematographer
- Edward Colman (martyr) (1636–1678), English Catholic courtier
- Edward Colman (serjeant-at-arms) (c. 1734–1815), English politician, courtier and House of Commons official
- Elihu Colman (1841–1899), American lawyer and politician
- Enrique Pérez Colman (1886–1957), Argentine lawyer, academic and politician
- Ethel Colman (1863–1948), Lord Mayor of Norwich, daughter of Jeremiah Colman
- Eugene Ernest Colman (1878–1964), English chess master

== F ==
- Felicity Colman (born 1967), Australian academic
- Frank Colman (1918–1983), Canadian baseball player
- Fraser Colman (1925–2008), New Zealand politician

== G ==
- Gastón Colmán (born 1989), Uruguayan footballer
- Geoffrey Colman (1892–1935), English cricketer, father of Timothy Colman
- George Colman the Elder (1732–1794), English dramatist
- George Colman the Younger (1762–1836), English dramatist
- Grace Colman (1892–1971), British politician
- Gustavo Colman (born 1985), Argentine footballer

== H ==
- Henry Colman (1923–2012), American television producer and screenwriter
- Henry R. Colman (1800–1895), American pioneer in Wisconsin and co-founder of Lawrence University
- Hila Colman (1909–2008), American author

== I ==
- Iván Colman (born 1995), Argentine footballer

== J ==
- Jack Colman (1887–1965) was a New Zealand rugby union footballer
- Jeremiah Colman (1777–1851), English miller
- Jeremiah Colman (MP) (1830–1898), English businessman and politician; father of Ethel
- Sir Jeremiah Colman, 1st Baronet (1859–1942), English businessman
- Jeremy Colman (born 1948), Welsh civil servant
- John Colman (died 1609), English sailor
- José Colman (born 1985), Paraguayan footballer
- Josué Colmán (born 1998), Paraguayan footballer
- Juan Carlos Colmán (1922–1999), Argentine footballer
- Julia Colman (1828–1909), American temperance educator, activist, editor and writer

== L ==
- Lucy N. Colman (1817–1906), American freethinker, abolitionist and feminist campaigner
- Luis Colman (1954–2014), Uruguayan rower

== M ==
- Lady Mary Colman (1932–2021), English courtier and philanthropist
- Mike Colman (1968–1994), American ice hockey player
- Sir Michael Colman, 3rd Baronet (1928–2023), British businessman

== N ==
- Neville Colman (1945–2003), South African hematologist and forensic DNA expert
- Nicolás Colman (fl. 1536), English conquistador who served the Spanish Crown
- Nigel Colman (politician) (1886–1966), British businessman and politician
- Nigel Colman (RAF officer) (born 1971), British Royal Air Force officer
- Norman Jay Colman (1827–1911), American attorney, politician and newspaper publisher

== O ==
- Olivia Colman (born 1974), British actress
- Orlando Colmán (born 2002), Paraguayan footballer

== P ==
- Paul Colman (born 1967), British-Australian pop-rock musician
- Penny Colman (born 1944), American author
- Peter Colman (born 1944), Australian medical researcher

== R ==
- Richard Colman (born 1984), Australian paralympic athlete
- Richard Colman (MP) (c. 1633–1672), English politician
- Robert Colman (died 1428), English Franciscan and university chancellor
- Roberta F. Colman (1938–2019), American biochemist
- Roger Colman (c. 1623–1660), English landowner and politician
- Roger Colman (sailor) (born 1951), Australian competitive sailor
- Ronald Colman (1891–1958), English actor
- Rosamund Colman (1885–1950), Welsh golf and tennis player
- Rudy Colman (born 1956), Belgian racing cyclist

== S ==
- Samuel Colman (1832–1920), American interior designer
- Samuel Colman (British painter) (1780–1845)
- Samy Colman (born 1996), Moroccan equestrian
- Sara Colman, British jazz singer
- Stanley Colman (1862–1942), English cricketer
- Steve Colman, American poet, playwright, producer and director
- Stuart Colman (1944–2018), English musician, record producer and broadcaster
- Stuart Colman (architect) (1848–1941), Welsh architect

== T ==
- Timothy Colman (1929–2021), British businessman
- Tony Colman (born 1961), stage name London Elektricity, English drum and bass producer
- Tony Colman (politician), British politician and businessman
- Trevor Colman (1941–2022), British politician
- Tyler Colman, American wine critic

== V ==
- Valeria Colmán (born 1990), Uruguayan footballer

== W ==
- Walter Colman (1600–1645), English Franciscan
- Wayne Colman (born 1946), American football player
- William Colman (1728–1794), English Anglican priest and academic

== See also ==
- Edward Colmans (1908–1977), American actor
- Coleman (surname)
