= Jeremiah Colman (disambiguation) =

Jeremiah Colman (1777–1851) was a miller who invented Colman's mustard.

Jeremiah Colman may also refer to:

- Sir Jeremiah Colman, 1st Baronet (1859–1942)
- Sir Jeremiah Colman, 2nd Baronet, of the Colman baronets
- Jeremiah Colman (MP) (1830–1898)

== See also ==
- Colman (disambiguation)
