= Coleman House =

Coleman House may refer to:

in Singapore

- Coleman House, Singapore

in the United States

- John Coleman House, Eutaw, Alabama, listed on the National Register of Historic Places (NRHP) in Greene County
- Coleman-Banks House, Eutaw, Alabama, NRHP-listed in Greene County
- Coleman House (Lewes, Delaware), NRHP-listed in Sussex County
- Cheely-Coleman House, Jewell, Georgia, NRHP-listed in Hancock County
- James W. Coleman House, Moultrie, Georgia, NRHP-listed in Colquitt County
- James Coleman House (Swainsboro, Georgia), also known as Coleman House Inn, NRHP-listed in Emanuel County
- Cunningham-Coleman House, Wadley, Georgia, NRHP-listed in Jefferson County
- Devereux-Coleman House, Milledgeville, Georgia, NRHP-listed in Baldwin County
- Coleman House (Newton, Kansas), NRHP-listed in Harvey County
- Coleman House (Bedford, Kentucky), NRHP-listed in Trimble County
- William L. Coleman House, Bedford, Kentucky, NRHP-listed in Trimble County
- Coleman-Desha Plantation, Cynthiana, Kentucky, NRHP-listed in Harrison County
- Coleman Hall, Fayette, Missouri, NRHP-listed in Howard County
- William E. Coleman House, Deer Lodge, Montana, NRHP-listed in Powell County
- Dakin-Coleman Farm, Millerton, New York, NRHP-listed in Dutchess County
- Coleman-White House, Warrenton, North Carolina, NRHP-listed in Warren County
- George L. Coleman Sr. House, Miami, Oklahoma, NRHP-listed in Ottawa County
- Coleman–Scott House, Portland, Oregon, NRHP-listed in northeast Portland
- Stiegel-Coleman House, Brickerville, Pennsylvania, NRHP-listed in Lancaster County
- Webb-Coleman House, Chappells, South Carolina, NRHP-listed in Saluda County
- Cravens-Coleman House, Chattanooga, Tennessee, NRHP-listed in Hamilton County
- Coleman-Cole House, Waxahachie, Texas, NRHP-listed in Ellis County
- William Coleman House, Midway, Utah, NRHP-listed in Wasatch County
- Watkins-Coleman House, Midway, Utah, NRHP-listed in Wasatch County
- Coleman-Furlong House, Port Townsend, Washington, NRHP-listed in Jefferson County
