= Coleman =

Coleman may refer to:

== Places ==
=== Antarctica ===
- Coleman Glacier (Antarctica)
- Coleman Peak, Ross Island

=== Canada ===
- Coleman, Alberta, a community
- Coleman, Ontario, a township municipality
- Coleman, Prince Edward Island, a rural community
- Lake Coleman, a former lake created approximately 75,000 years ago

=== United States ===
- Coleman, Arkansas, an unincorporated community
- Coleman, Florida, a city
- Coleman, Georgia, a census-designated place and former city
- Coleman, Michigan, a city
- Coleman, Missouri, an unincorporated community
- Coleman, Ohio, an unincorporated community
- Coleman, Oklahoma, an unincorporated community and census-designated place
- Coleman, Texas, a town
  - Coleman Municipal Airport
- Coleman, West Virginia, an unincorporated community
- Coleman, Wisconsin, a village
- Coleman City, California
- Coleman County, Texas
- Coleman Township, Holt County, Nebraska
- Coleman Branch, a stream in Tennessee
- Coleman Creek (disambiguation)
- Coleman Glacier (Washington)
- Coleman Pond, Georgia

=== Elsewhere ===
- Coleman, Leicester, England, an electoral ward and administrative division of the city of Leicester
- Coleman Army Airfield, Mannheim, Germany

== People ==
- Coleman (surname), a list of people
- Coleman (given name), a list of people

== Schools ==
- Coleman University (1963–2018), a former private university in San Diego, California, United States
- Coleman College (disambiguation)
- Coleman High School (disambiguation)

== Other uses ==
- Coleman (brand), a manufacturer of camping gear
- Coleman Manufacturing Company, a North Carolina textile mill
- Federal Correctional Complex, Coleman, Florida, a federal prison complex
  - United States Penitentiary, Coleman, two prisons (Coleman I and II) for men
- Coleman Medal, an Australian Football League award
- Cameron Coleman, a fictional character in Seven on 7: Seven on 7 with Cameron Coleman, and the third season of The Boys

== See also ==
- Colman (disambiguation)
