= James Coleman =

James Coleman may refer to:

== Academics ==
- James Earl Coleman (born 1946), American attorney and professor of law
- James Samuel Coleman (1926–1995), American sociologist
- James Smoot Coleman (1919–1985), American political scientist

== Artists and entertainers ==
- James Coleman (broadcaster) (born 1968), New Zealand television presenter, radio host and actor
- James Coleman (Irish artist) (born 1941)
- Jim Coleman (actor) (born 1961), American actor and producer
- Jim Coleman (musician) (fl. 1990s–2010s), American keyboards and sampler player
- J. Paul Emerson or Jimmy Coleman (1942/3–2001), American radio host

== Government ==
- James Coleman (politician) (fl. 2010s–2020s), president pro tempore of the Colorado State Senate
- James H. Coleman (born 1999), councilmember for the City of South San Francisco
- James H. Coleman (judge) (1933–2024), justice of the Supreme Court of New Jersey
- James M. Coleman (1924–2014), American jurist and legislator
- James P. Coleman (1914–1991), governor of Mississippi
- James S. Coleman (judge) (1906–1987), justice of the Supreme Court of Alabama

== Sports ==
- James W. Coleman, early 20th-century American basketball coach
- Jim Coleman (curler), curler in the 2010 Safeway Championship
- Jim Coleman (dancer), dancer who worked with Martha Mason in the 1980s
- Jim Coleman (volleyball), volleyball player for the United States at the 1968 Summer Olympics
- James Coleman, a gridiron football official, currently on Clete Blakeman's crew

== Other people ==
- James J. Coleman (born 1950), American electrical engineer
- James Malone Coleman, bishop of the Episcopal Diocese of West Tennessee
- Jim Coleman (journalist) (1911–2001), Canadian sports journalist

== Other uses ==
- James Coleman House in Swainsboro, Georgia
- James W. Coleman House in Moultrie, Georgia

== See also ==
- Coleman (disambiguation)
- James Colman, American businessman
