= Michael Colman =

Michael Colman may refer to:

- Mike Colman, ice hockey player
- Sir Michael Colman, 3rd Baronet (1928–2023), British businessman

== See also ==
- Michael Coleman (disambiguation)
- Colman (surname)
