= Colman baronets of Gatton Park (1907) =

Escutcheon of the Colman baronets of Gatton Park

The Colman baronetcy, of Gatton Park in the parish of Gatton in the County of Surrey, was created in the Baronetage of the United Kingdom on 26 November 1907 for Jeremiah Colman. He was Chairman of J. & J. Colman Ltd, mustard, cornflour and starch manufacturers, of Norwich and London, and also served as a Lieutenant of the City of London.

== Colman baronets, of Gatton Park (1907) ==
- Sir Jeremiah Colman, 1st Baronet (1859–1942)
- Sir Jeremiah Colman, 2nd Baronet (1886–1961)
- Sir Michael Jeremiah Colman, 3rd Baronet (1928–2023)
- Sir Jeremiah Michael Powlett Colman, 4th Baronet (born 1958).

The heir apparent is the 4th Baronet's eldest son, Joseph Jeremiah Colman (born 1988).

== Notes ==
Baronetage of the United Kingdom
Preceded by Bilsland baronets	Colman baronets of Gatton Park; 26 November 1907	Succeeded by Cory baronets
