= 1907 New Zealand rugby union tour of Australia =

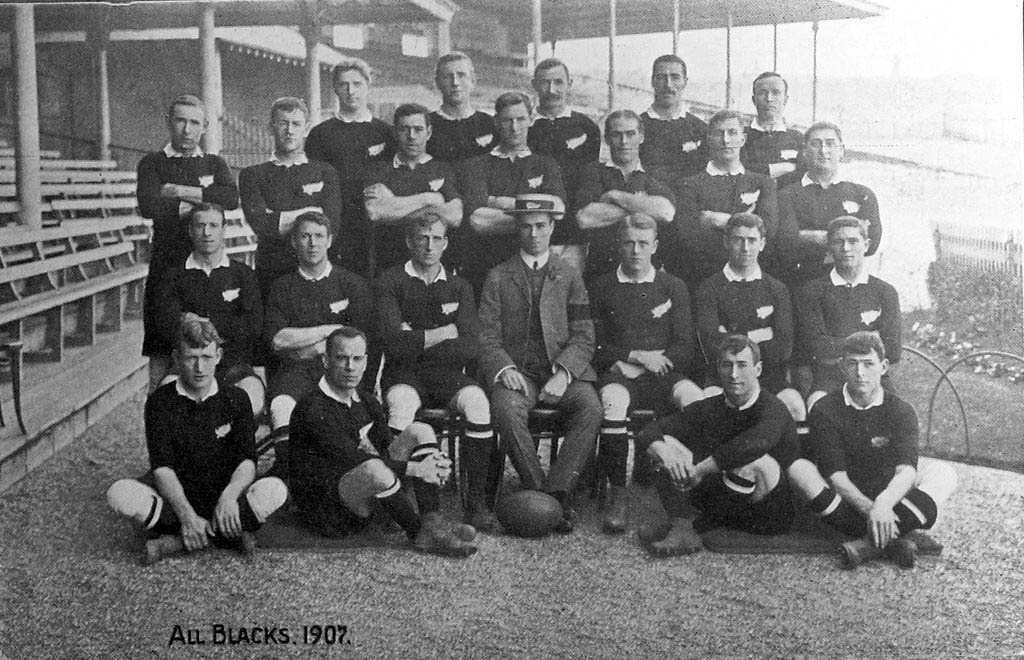
- The touring team
- Top point scorer: Frank Fryer (33)
Summary
P	W	D	L
Total
7	5	0	1
Test match
3	2	1	0
Opponent
P	W	D	L
Australia
3	2	1	0

Tour chronology
- ← 1905 Europe & N.America 1910 Australia →

The 1907 New Zealand rugby union tour of Australia was the sixth tour by the New Zealand national team to Australia. Four matches were played against regional and district sides along with three Test match against the Australia national side, being the first time both teams played each other.

New Zealand won the series with two victories and a tied match. Before the tour matches, New Zealand played a preliminary game v. the Wellington RU team at the Athletic Park, won by the All Blacks 19–6.

== Match summary ==
Complete list of matches played by the All Blacks in Australia:

Test matches

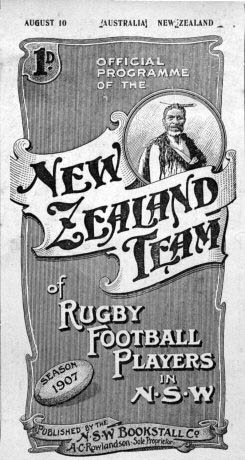
Official programme of the third test

#	Date	Rival	City	Venue	Score
1	13 Jul	NSW Waratahs	Sydney	Cricket Ground	11–3
2	17 Jul	NSW Waratahs	Sydney	Cricket Ground	0–14
3	20 Jul	Australia	Sydney	Cricket Ground	26–6
4	24 Jul	Queensland Reds	Brisbane	Woolloongabba Ground	23–3
5	27 Jul	Queensland Reds	Brisbane	Woolloongabba Ground	17–11
6	3 Aug	Australia	Brisbane	Woolloongabba Ground	14–5
7	10 Aug	Australia	Sydney	Cricket Ground	5–5

Balance
Pl	W	D	L	Ps	Pc
7	5	1	1	96	47

== Match details ==
=== Waratahs (first match) ===
13 July

NSW Waratahs	3–11	New Zealand
	Report	Try: Roberts, Seeling, Wallace; Con: Wallace

Cricket Ground, Sydney
Attendance: 51,000
Referee: N.B. Martin (New South Wales)

Team details

New Zealand: S. T. Casey, A. McDonald, J. M. O'Sullivan, W. Cunningham, A. R. H. Francis, W. Johnston, C. E. Seeling, G. A. Gillett, F. Roberts, H. J. Mynott, W. J. Wallace, J. Hunter (c), F. E. Mitchinson, F. C. Fryer, G. Spencer

=== Waratahs (second match) ===
17 July

NSW Waratahs	14–0	New Zealand
	Report

Cricket Ground, Sydney
Attendance: 25,000

Team details

New Zealand: S. T. Casey, H. Paton, A. McDonald, W. Cunningham, A. R. H. Francis, W. Johnston, J. C. Spencer, J. T. H. Colman, F. Roberts, A. G. Eckhold, E. E. Booth, J. Hunter (c), W. J. Wallace, F. C. Fryer, G. Spencer

=== Australia (first Test) ===
20 July

Australia	6–26	New Zealand
Con: P. Carmichael; Pen: P. Carmichael	Report	Try: Francis, Hughes, Mitchinson (3), Seeling; Con: Wallace (4)

Cricket Ground, Sydney
Attendance: 50,000
Referee: A. Brown (New South Wales)

Team details

Australia	New Zealand

Australia: J. Rosewell (Graves), T. S. Griffen, J. T. Barnett (Richards), P. A. McCue, P. H. Burge (c), P. Flanagan, J. Hughes, N. E. Row, F. Wood, C. H. McKivatt, C. Russell, W. Dix, F. B. Smith, G. Watson, P. Carmichael
New Zealand: E. Hughes, S. T. Casey, A. R. H. Francis, W. Cunningham, W. Johnston, C. E. Seeling, A. McDonald, J. T. H. Colman (Spencer), F. Roberts H. J. Mynott, W. J. Wallace, J. Hunter (c), F. E. Mitchinson, F. C. Fryer, E. E. Booth

=== Reds (first match) ===
24 July

Queensland Reds	3–23	New Zealand
	Report	Try: Francis (3), Fryers (4); Con: Spencer

Woolloongabba Ground, Brisbane

Team details

Queensland	New Zealand

New Zealand: S. T. Casey, E. Hughes, J. M. O'Sullivan, W. Cunningham, A. R. H. Francis, G. W. Nicholson, C. E. Seeling, J. Hogan, F. Roberts (c), A. G. Eckhold, E. E. Booth, W. J. Wallace, F. E. Mitchinson, F. C. Fryer, G. Spencer

=== Reds (second match) ===
27 July

Queensland Reds	11–17	New Zealand
	Report	Try: Fryer (5); Con: Gillett

Woolloongabba Ground, Brisbane
Attendance: 14,000
Referee: Campbell (Queensland)

Team details

Queensland	New Zealand

New Zealand: A. McDonald, E. Hughes, W. Johnston, W. Cunningham, G. W. Nicholson, J. C. Spencer, C. E. Seeling, J. Hogan, F. Roberts (c), A. G. Eckhold, E. E. Booth, W. J. Wallace, G. A. Gillett, F. C. Fryer, G. Spencer

=== Australia (second Test) ===
3 August

Australia	5–14	New Zealand
Try: Messenger; Con: Messenger	Report	Try: Francis, Hunter, Seeling, Wallace; Con: Wallace

Woolloongabba Ground, Brisbane
Attendance: 17,000
Referee: C. B. Cochrane (Queensland)

Team details

Australia	New Zealand

Australia: A. M. Oxlade (c), V. Oxenham, J. T. Barnett, P. H. Burge, W. Caniffe, J. Fihelly, P. Flanagan, E. W. Richards, F. Wood, E. F. Mandible, H. H. Messenger, F. B. Smith, C. Russell, C. E Parkinson, W. Dix
New Zealand: E. Hughes, S. T. Casey, A. R. H. Francis, W. Cunningham, W. Johnston, C. E. Seeling, G. W. Nicholson, G. A. Gillett, F. Roberts, H. J. Mynott, W. J. Wallace, J. Hunter (c), F. E. Mitchinson, F. C. Fryer, J. T. H. Colman

=== Australia (third Test) ===
10 August

Australia	5–5	New Zealand
Try: Wood; Con: Messenger	Report	Try: Mitchinson; Con: Wallace

Cricket Ground, Sydney
Attendance: 35,000
Referee: C. E. Morgan (New South Wales)

Team details

Australia	New Zealand

Australia: J. Rosewell, T. S. Griffen, J. T. Barnett, P. A. McCue, P. H. Burge (c), J. Hughes, A. B. Burge, N. E. Row, F. Wood, C. H. McKivatt, H. H. Messenger, E. F. Mandible, F. B. Smith, C. Russell, W. Dix
New Zealand: E. Hughes, S. T. Casey, G. W. Nicholson, W. Cunningham, W. Johnstonm, J. M. O'Sullivan, A. R. H. Francis, G. A. Gillett, F. Roberts, H. J. Mynott, W. J. Wallace, J. Hunter (c), F. E. Mitchinson, F. C. Fryer, E. E. Booth
