= Colman =

Colman or Colmán may refer to:

== People ==
- Colman (given name)
- Colman (surname)

== Places ==
- Colman, South Dakota, United States, a city
- Arthurstown (Irish: Colmán), County Wexford, Ireland, a village

== Other uses ==
- Colman's, a British mustard manufacturer
- Colman baronets, two titles in the Baronetage of the United Kingdom
- Colman, sequel to Monica Furlong's Wise Child novel

== See also ==
- St Colman's (disambiguation)
- Coleman (disambiguation)
- Colm
- Kolman, a Slavic name sometimes transliterated as Colman
- Coloman, an ancient Germanic name
- Kálmán, a Hungarian surname and given name
- Colmar (disambiguation)
