= Don Coleman =

Don Coleman may refer to:

- Don Coleman (actor) (1893–1987), American film actor
- Don Coleman (offensive tackle) (1928–2017), American football player
- Don Coleman (linebacker) (born 1952), American football player and entrepreneur
- Don Coleman (musician), Canadian rock singer
- Don Coleman (coach) (1933–2020), Texas high school basketball coach

== See also ==
- Donald Coleman (1925–1991), British politician
- Donald Coleman (cricketer) (1927–1983), New Zealand cricketer
