= Richard Colman (disambiguation) =

Richard Colman is an athlete.

Richard Col(e)man may also refer to:

- Richard Colman (MP)
- Dick Colman (Richard Whiting Colman Jr.), American football player and coach
- Richard Coleman, actor
- Richard Henry Coleman, organist
- Richard A. Coleman Highway
- Rich Coleman, Canadian politician
