= Colmar (disambiguation) =

Colmar is a commune in France.

Colmar may also refer to:

- Colmar, Illinois, USA
- Colmar, Kentucky, USA
- Colmar, Pennsylvania, USA
- Colmar-Berg, a commune and town in Luxembourg
- Colmar station (disambiguation), stations of the name

== See also ==
- Colmars
- Colomars
- Colmenar (disambiguation)
- Colma
- Colman
