= John Coleman =

John Coleman may refer to:

== Sports ==
- John Coleman (Australian footballer) (1928–1973), Australian rules footballer and coach for Essendon
- John Coleman (footballer, born 1946), English footballer
- John Coleman (footballer, born 1962), English football manager and former player
- John Coleman (Gaelic footballer) (born 1951), Irish Gaelic retired footballer
- John Coleman (greyhound trainer) (born 1935)
- John Coleman (baseball, born 1863) (1863–1922), American baseball outfielder and pitcher
- John Coleman (baseball, born 1860) (1860–1915), American baseball right-handed starting pitcher
- John Coleman (rugby league), Irish rugby league player
- Tim Coleman (John George Coleman, 1881–1940), English footballer
- John J. Coleman, college football player for Louisiana State University
- John Kevin Coleman (born 1944), Irish hurler and local politician

== Military ==
- John Coleman (VC) (1821–1858), Victoria Cross recipient
- John Coleman (Medal of Honor) (1847–1904), Medal of Honor recipient

== Entertainment ==
- John Coleman (artist) (born 1949), American sculptor and painter of the American Southwest
- John Coleman (musician) (born 1934), British conductor and music arranger
- John Ery Coleman (1923–1993), American artist

== Others ==
- John Coleman (Australian politician) (1862–1905), New South Wales politician
- John Coleman (bishop) (1887–1947), Irish-born Australian bishop of the Catholic Church
- John Coleman (meteorologist) (1934–2018), co-founder of The Weather Channel
- John Coleman (psychologist) (born 1940), British author and psychologist
- John C. Coleman (1823–1919), California mining, railroad, and public utility magnate
- John Clay Coleman (1871–1911), American–Canadian minister, theologian, and black rights activist
- John Earl Coleman (1930–2012), teacher of Vipassana meditation
- John Royston Coleman (1921–2016), economist, president of Haverford College
- John V. Coleman (1874–?), coal miner and state legislator in West Virginia
- J. C. Coleman (John Cristopher Coleman, 1914–1971), Irish geographer, archaeologist, speleologist and mountaineer

== See also ==
- Jack Coleman (disambiguation)
- Jean Coleman (officer) (1908–1982), Anglo-French SOE Officer in WWII
- Jon Coleman (born 1975), American professional ice hockey player
- Jonathan Coleman (disambiguation)
