= Priscilla Coleman =

Priscilla Coleman may refer to:

- Priscilla K. Coleman, American psychologist known for her disputed work on abortion
- Priscilla Coleman (artist), UK court room sketch artist
