= Jack Coleman =

Jack Coleman may refer to:

- Jack Coleman (actor) (born 1958), American actor and screenwriter
- Jack Coleman (basketball) (1924–1998), American basketball player
- Jack Coleman (politician) (born 1953), American politician
- J. C. Coleman (died 1971), Irish geologist and speleologist

== See also ==
- Jack Colman (1887–1965), New Zealand rugby union player
- John Coleman (disambiguation)
- Coleman (disambiguation)
