= Sir Michael Colman, 3rd Baronet =

British businessman (1928–2023)

Arms of the Colman baronets

Sir Michael Jeremiah Colman, 3rd Baronet FRSA (7 July 1928 – 26 December 2023) was a British businessman. He served as director of Reckitt & Colman plc, the Church of England's First Church Estates Commissioner and founder of Summerdown, a commercial peppermint farm in Hampshire.

== Early life and education ==
Michael Jeremiah Colman was born on 7 July 1928 to Jeremiah Colman (later 2nd baronet, of Gatton Park; 1886–1961) and Edith Gwendolen Tritton (1902–1980), scion of the Tritton baronets. He was the grandson of Sir Jeremiah Colman, 1st Bt, and a descendant of Jeremiah Colman, founder of Colman's.

Colman was educated at Eton College. He served his national service in the Royal Marines and the Army, gaining the rank of Captain in the Queen's Own Yorkshire Yeomanry. In 1961, he inherited the Colman baronetcy from his father.

== Career ==
Colman began his business career in his family's condiment company, J. & J. Colman, working in the international division. He became director Reckitt & Colman plc's, the public successor to J. & J. Colman, overseas board in 1962 and finance director in 1980. He was chairman from 1986 until his retirement in 1995.

From 1993 to 1999, he served as the Church of England's First Church Estates Commissioner, overseeing the Church's investment portfolio. For his work with the Church, he was awarded the Cross of St Augustine. In 1993, he was awarded an honorary Doctor of Law (LL.D.) by the University of Hull. He was a fellow of the Royal Society of Arts.

After retiring from Reckitt & Colman plc in 1995, Colman founded Summerdown, a peppermint farm and distillery in Hampshire. Summerdown revived the Black Mitcham peppermint crop which had been extinct in England for 50 years.

== Personal life ==
On 29 October 1955, he married Judith Jean Wallop William-Powlett (born 7 February 1936), daughter of Vice Admiral Sir Peveril William-Powlett. They had three daughters and two sons, including Sir Jeremiah Colman, 4th Baronet. Lady Colman is patron of several charitable organizations, including SeeAbility and Basingstoke & District Disability Forum.

Sir Michael died on 26 December 2023, at the age of 95. He was succeeded in the baronetcy by his elder son, Jeremiah "Jamie" (born 1958).

Baronetage of the United Kingdom
Preceded by Jeremiah Colman	Baronet (of Gatton Park); 1961–2023	Succeeded by Jeremiah Colman
