= Jonathan Coleman =

Jonathan Coleman may refer to:

- Jonathan Coleman (author) (born 1951), American author
- Jonathan Coleman (politician) (born 1966), New Zealand politician
- Jonathan Coleman (physicist) (born 1973), professor of chemical physics
- Jonathan Coleman (presenter) (1956–2021), English-Australian television personality
- Jonathon Coleman, Australia singer-songwriter who performs as Bully Hay
- Jon Coleman (born 1975), American professional ice hockey player

== See also ==
- John Coleman (disambiguation)
- Coleman (disambiguation)
