= Tom Coleman =

Tom Coleman may refer to:

- Tom Coleman (film producer), founder of Atlantic Entertainment Group
- Tom Coleman (Georgia politician) (1928–2014), Georgia state senator
- Tom Coleman (Missouri politician) (born 1943), former U.S. Congressman from Missouri

== See also ==
- Thomas Coleman (disambiguation)
