= Laleh Mehran =

Laleh Mehran (born 1968) is an Iranian-born American digital artist, and professor. She is the graduate director and a professor in emergent digital practices at the University of Denver. Mehran is known for her interactive digital installation art. She lives between Denver and Columbus, Ohio.

== Early life and education ==
Laleh Mehran was born in 1968 in Tehran, Pahlavi Iran. Her family relocated to the United States when she was age 10, at the beginning of the Iranian Revolution in 1978.

Mehran received her BFA degree in creative photography from the University of Florida in 1991; and her MFA degree in electronic time-based media from Carnegie Mellon University in 1997.

== Career ==
Mehran is a multimedia artist whose interactive work blends video, performance and geometry into exciting new forms. Mehran's grand, participatory installations explore both her personal history as the daughter of Iranian scientists who fled the revolution roiling through the country in the 1970s as well as broader themes of alienation and resistance. Mehran's areas of research include the intersections of art and science, media politics, Eastern and Western philosophies and emerging forms of time-based media. Her work exists as interactive installations, videos, and performances.

Mehran's work has been shown individually and collaboratively in the US and international venues including the ISEA (United Arab Emirates), National Taiwan Museum of Fine Arts (Taiwan), FILE (Brazil), ACT Festival (South Korea), Massachusetts Museum of Contemporary Art (Massachusetts), Carnegie Museum of Art (Pennsylvania), The Georgia Museum of Art (Georgia), The Andy Warhol Museum (Pennsylvania), Denver Art Museum (Colorado), 404 International Festival of Art & Technology (Argentina), Next 5 Minutes 4 Tactical Media Festival (Netherlands), European Media Arts Festival (Germany), Boulder Museum of Contemporary Art (Colorado), Currents: The Santa Fe International New Media Festival (New Mexico), and the Pittsburgh Biennial (Pennsylvania).

Her interactive installation Unclaimed, a production with partner Chris Coleman, was shown at the 2015 Biennial of the Americas at the Museum of Contemporary Art Denver.

She previously taught at the Lamar Dodd School of Art at the University of Georgia.

== See also ==
- List of Iranian women artists
