= George Colman =

George Colman may refer to:

- George Colman the Elder (1732–1794), English dramatist
- George Colman the Younger (1762–1836), English dramatist, son of the above

== See also ==
- George Coleman (disambiguation)
