= Chris Coleman =

Chris or Christopher Coleman may refer to:

== Sports ==
- Chris Coleman (footballer) (born 1970), Welsh football manager and former Wales international player
- Christopher Coleman (bobsleigh) (born 1967), American bobsledder
- Christopher Coleman (cricketer) (born 1980), former English cricketer
- Chris Coleman (wide receiver, born 1977), American football wide receiver
- Chris Coleman (wide receiver, born 1999), American football wide receiver

== Others ==
- Chris Coleman (politician) (born 1961), Minnesota politician and mayor of Saint Paul
- Christopher Coleman (businessman) (born 1968), British businessman
- Chris Coleman, a character in episode of the American drama TV series Bull
- Christopher Coleman, convicted former chief of security of Joyce Meyer Ministries
- Chris Coleman (artist), American artist and open source advocate

== See also ==
- Christian Coleman, American sprinter
- Christian Coleman (rugby union), Welsh rugby union player
