= Charles Coleman =

Charles Coleman may refer to:

== Arts ==
- Charles Coleman (English painter) (1807–1874), English painter
- Charles Caryl Coleman (1840–1928), American painter
- Charles Coleman (actor) (1885–1951), Australian-American actor
- Charles C. Coleman (director) (1900–1972), American film director
- Charles Coleman (music producer) (born 1977), American record producer and songwriter

== Other ==
- Charles Coleman (American football) (born 1963), American football player
- Charles Coleman (British Army officer) (1903–1974), British general
- Charles Coleman (engineer) (1926–2005), electronic engineer - video tape recording
- Charles Coleman (murderer) (1947–1990), American convicted murderer
- Charles Coleman (politician), American member of the Wisconsin State Assembly
- Chase Coleman III (Charles Payson Coleman III, born 1975), American investor
