= William Coleman =

William, Will or Bill Coleman may refer to:

== Business ==
- William Coffin Coleman (1870–1957), founder of the Coleman Company
- William Frank Kobina Coleman (1922–?), Ghanaian engineer and director-general of the Ghana Broadcasting Corporation
- William T. Coleman III (1947–2020), American businessman, CEO of Veritas Technologies
- William Tell Coleman (1824–1893), American pioneer and businessman
- William C. Coleman (1901–1976), US railroad executive

== Entertainment ==
- Bill Coleman (artist) (1922–1993), Australian artist
- Bill Coleman (trumpeter) (1904–1981), jazz trumpeter
- Will Coleman (storyteller) Cornish film-maker, author, and musician
- William Stephen Coleman (1829–1904), English painter and book illustrator

== Politics ==
- Bill Coleman (Oklahoma politician), member of the Oklahoma Senate
- William Coleman (politician) (1878–?), house painter, labor activist, and Socialist politician from Milwaukee
- William C. Coleman Jr. (1925–2012), member of the Florida House of Representatives
- William D. Coleman (politician) (1842–1908), president of Liberia
- William H. Coleman (1871–1943), Republican member of the U.S. House of Representatives from Pennsylvania
- William Thaddeus Coleman Jr. (1920–2017), U.S. Secretary of Transportation

== Religion ==
- Bill Coleman (bishop) (1917–1992), Anglican bishop in Canada
- William D. Coleman (pastor) (1915–2001), first principal of the Andhra Christian Theological College, Hyderabad
- William Emmette Coleman (1843–1909), American clerk, Orientalist, spiritualist and writer

== Sports ==
- Will Coleman (American football) (1869–1934), American football coach at the University of Kansas
- William Coleman (basketball) (born 1988), American basketball player
- William Coleman (equestrian) (born 1983), American equestrian
- Bill Coleman (cricketer) (1878–1960), English cricketer

== Other ==
- William Coleman (editor) (1766–1829), first editor of the New York Evening Post
- William Coleman (historian) (1934–1988), American historian of biology
- William Coleman (judge) (1704–1769), judge in colonial Philadelphia, Pennsylvania
- William Caldwell Coleman (1884–1968), American federal judge
- William D. Coleman (scientist) (1950–2023), Canadian political science academic
- William Higgins Coleman (1812–1863), English botanist
- William Thaddeus Coleman III (born 1947), General Counsel of the U.S. Army
- William Peter Coleman (1928–2019), Australian writer and politician
- William B. Coleman, prisoner who carried out hunger strike which led to the Lantz v. Coleman case addressing the constitutionality of force-feeding

== See also ==
- Billy Coleman (born 1947), Irish motorsport rally driver
- William Coleman Anderson (1853–1902), American Republican politician
- SS William T. Coleman, 1942 Liberty ship
