= Robert Coleman =

Robert, Rob, Bob, or Bobby Coleman may refer to:

== Arts and entertainment ==
- Rob Coleman (born 1964), Canadian special effects artist
- Bobby Coleman (born 1997), American actor
- Robert Coleman, also known as Quakemaster, a supervillain from DC Comics

== Business and industry ==
- Robert Coleman (industrialist) (1748–1825), American industrialist
- Robert L. Coleman (?–1924), American financier assassinated in Albania
- Robert Habersham Coleman (1856–1930), American iron processing and railroad industrialist

== Science and medicine ==
- Robert Coleman (geologist) (1923–2020), American geologist
- Robert F. Coleman (1954–2014), American mathematician
- Robert S. Coleman (born 1959), American chemist

== Sports ==
- Robert M. Coleman (American football) (1878–1941), American college football player, coach, and physician
- Robert Coleman (sailor) (1883–1960), British Olympic sailor
- Bob Coleman (1890–1959), American baseball player

== Others ==
- Robert Colman or Coleman (died 1428), English medieval Franciscan friar and university chancellor
- Robert M. Coleman (Texan politician) (1799–1837), American politician and soldier
- Robert Coleman-Senghor (1940–2011), American professor and mayor of Cotati, California
