= Colmenar (disambiguation) =

Colmenar is a municipality in Andalusia, Spain.

Colmenar may also refer to places in Spain:

- Colmenar Viejo, a municipality in the Community of Madrid
  - AD Colmenar Viejo, a football team
- Colmenar del Arroyo, a municipality in the Community of Madrid
- Colmenar de Oreja, a municipality in the Community of Madrid
  - CD Colmenar de Oreja, a football team
- Colmenar de Montemayor, a municipality in the province of Salamanca, Castile and León

== See also ==
- Colmenarejo
- Colmar (disambiguation)
