= Judge Coleman =

Judge Coleman may refer to:

- Frank Joseph Coleman (1886–1934), judge of the United States District Court for the Southern District of New York
- James P. Coleman (1914–1991), judge of the United States Court of Appeals for the Fifth Circuit
- Sharon Johnson Coleman (born 1960), judge of the United States District Court for the Northern District of Illinois
- William Caldwell Coleman (1884–1968), judge of the United States District Court for the District of Maryland
- William Thaddeus Coleman Jr. (1920–2017), judge of the United States Court of Military Commission Review

== See also ==
- Justice Coleman (disambiguation)
