= Kohlmann =

Kohlmann is a German surname. Notable people with the surname include:

- Anneliese Kohlmann (1921–1977), German SS camp guard
- Anthony Kohlmann (1771–1836), French Roman Catholic missionary and military chaplain
- Clarence Kohlmann (1891–1944), American composer
- Emma Kohlmann (born 1989), American artist
- Evan Kohlmann (born 1979), American writer
- Fabienne Kohlmann (born 1989), German hurdler
- Janine Kohlmann (born 1990), German modern pentathlete
- Martin Kohlmann (born 1977), German politician
- Michael Kohlmann (born 1974), German tennis player
- Patricia Kohlmann (born 1968), Mexican swimmer
- Patrick Kohlmann (born 1983), German/Irish footballer
- Ralph Kohlmann, American lawyer and United States Marine Corps officer

== See also ==
- Kohlman
