= Michael Coleman =

Michael Coleman may refer to:

== Arts and entertainment ==
- Michael Coleman (author) (born 1946), English writer of books for children and young adults
- Michael Coleman (blues musician) (1956–2014), American blues guitarist
- Michael Coleman (dancer) (born 1940), British ballet dancer
- Michael Coleman (fiddler) (1891–1945), Irish-American fiddler
- T. Michael Coleman (born 1951), American bass player of bluegrass and folk music
- Michael Coleman, English musician of Brian and Michael
- Michael Coleman (The Walking Dead), a minor fictional character

== Others ==
- Michael Coleman (baseball) (born 1975), American outfielder
- Michael Coleman (bishop) (1902–1969), Anglican bishop
- Michael Coleman (hurler) (1962–2025), Irish hurler
- Michael Coleman (unionist), American labor union leader
- Michael B. Coleman (born 1954), American politician, former mayor of Columbus, Ohio
- Michael Gower Coleman (1939–2011), Roman Catholic bishop of Port Elizabeth, South Africa

== See also ==
- Michael Colman (disambiguation)
- Coleman (disambiguation)
