= Kollmann =

Kollmann is a German occupational surname, which means "coal miner" or "coal seller", from the Middle High German Kol "coal" and Mann "man". Alternative spellings include Köllmann, Kollman and Kolmann. The name may refer to:

- Arthur Kollmann (1858–1941) German medical researcher
- Augustus Frederic Christopher Kollmann (1756–1829), German composer
- Christina Kollmann (born 1988), Austrian cyclist
- Florian Kollmann (born 1980), German politician
- Gabriele Köllmann (born 1960), German slalom canoeist
- Jeffrey Kollman (born 1968), American musician
- Julius Kollmann (1834–1918), German scientist
- Nancy Kollmann (born 1950), American historian
- Peter Kollman (1944–2001), American chemist
- Petr Kolmann (born 1988), Czech ice hockey player
- Roland Kollmann (born 1976), Austrian football player
- Walter Kollmann (1932–2017), Austrian football player
