= Stanley Colman =

English cricketer

Personal information
- Born: 6 January 1862; Clapham, London
- Died: 27 February 1942 (aged 80); Walton-on-the-Hill, Surrey
- Batting: Right-handed
- Source: Cricinfo, 12 March 2017

Stanley Colman (6 January 1862 – 27 February 1942) was an English cricketer. He played six first-class matches for Surrey in 1882.

== Life and career ==
Stanley Colman was born on 6 January 1862 in Clapham. He was the youngest son of Edward Colman, who had played for Norfolk County Cricket Club in 1845, and the cousin of Sir Jeremiah Colman of Gatton Park.

Stanley Colman attended Amersham Hall school, near Reading, where his main sport was athletics, specifically sprint and hurdles races. He took up cricket after tearing a ligament during a competition event.

Colman was a right-handed batsman. He made his debut for Surrey against Nottinghamshire at Trent Bridge on 29 May 1882. A few days later, he scored 63 runs in his first innings against Middlesex at The Oval. His final appearance for the First XI was on 9 September against Gloucestershire. In total, in the 1882 season, he played six first-class matches, scoring 81 runs in 10 innings.

After being dropped from the First XI, Colman captained the Surrey Second XI. He represented Surrey in one further county match, against Essex at The Oval in 1888, scoring 19 and 7 in his first and second innings respectively. He played for W.G. Grace's XI against Oxford University in June 1899.

After retiring as a player, he served on the committees of Surrey and the Marylebone Cricket Club He was captain of The Wanderers for over 50 years and played both football and rugby for Clapham Rovers.

Colman died at his home, White House, Heath Drive, Walton-on-the-Hill, Surrey, on 27 February 1942. His funeral took place at the local parish church, St Peter's.
