= Coleman Creek =

Coleman Creek may refer to:

- Coleman Creek (San Diego County), a stream in California
- Coleman Creek (Bear Creek tributary), a stream in Oregon
- Coleman Creek (Hyco River tributary), a stream in Halifax County, Virginia
