= Attorney General Coleman =

Attorney General Coleman may refer to:

- James P. Coleman (1914–1991), Attorney General of Mississippi
- Peter Tali Coleman (1919–1997), Attorney General of American Samoa
- Marshall Coleman (born 1942), Attorney General of Virginia

== See also ==
- General Coleman (disambiguation)
