= Ralph Coleman =

Ralph Coleman may refer to:

- Ralph Coleman (baseball) (1895–1990), college baseball coach
- Ralph Coleman (American football) (born 1950), American football linebacker
- Ralph Pallen Coleman (1892–1968), American painter and illustrator
