= Colma =

Colma may refer to:

== Art, entertainment, and media ==
- Colma (album), 1998, by guitarist Buckethead
- Colma: The Musical (2006), an American independent film

== Places ==
- Colma, California, a town
  - Colma (BART station)
- Colma Creek, near the San Francisco Bay in California
- Monte Colma, a mountain in Liguria, northern Italy
