= Coleman (given name) =

Coleman is a masculine given name which may refer to:

- Coleman Barks (1937–2026), American poet and academic
- Coleman Bennett (born 2002), American football player
- Coleman Borthwick (born 2008), American baseball pitcher
- Coleman Crow (born 2000), American Major League Baseball pitcher
- Coleman Dowell (1925–1985), American writer
- Coleman Francis (1919–1973), American actor, writer, producer and director
- Coleman Hawkins (1904–1969), American jazz saxophonist
- Coleman Hawkins (basketball) (born 2001), American football player
- Coleman Hell (born 1989), Canadian singer-songwriter, musician and producer
- Coleman Hughes (born 1996), American writer and podcast host
- Coleman Lindsey (died 1968), American politician
- Coleman Mellett (1974–2009), American jazz guitarist
- Coleman Owen (born 2001), American football player
- Coleman Parsons (1905–1991), American scholar, writer and professor of literature
- Coleman Phillipson (1875? 1878?–1958), English legal scholar, law professor and historian
- Coleman Shelton (born 1995), American National Football League player
- Coleman Wong (born 2004), Hong Kong tennis player
- Coleman Young (1918–1997), American politician and mayor of Detroit

== See also ==
- T. Coleman du Pont (1863–1930), American engineer, politician and president of E. I. du Pont de Nemours and Company
