= Colmar station =

Colmar station may refer to:

- Colmar station (SEPTA), a SEPTA train station Colmar, Pennsylvania, USA
- Colmar station (Haut-Rhin), a railroad station in Colmar, France

== See also ==
- Colmar (disambiguation)
