= John Coleman (psychologist) =

British psychologist, born 1940

Dr. John Christopher Coleman (born 1940) is an English psychologist whose primary interest is adolescence. He has published widely on this subject. He is best known for his textbook The nature of adolescence. He is the Editor of the Routledge series "Adolescence and society" and is also the Editor of a new John Wiley series called "Understanding adolescence".

He was editor of the Journal of Adolescence from 1984 to 2000. In 1989 he founded the Trust for the Study of Adolescence. He was awarded an OBE in 2001 for services to youth justice.

His current research interests include young people and new technologies, the parenting of adolescents, and emotional health and well-being. He is engaged, with others, in the establishment of the Association for Young People's Health, which was launched at a major conference on 6 February 2008.
