= Lisa Coleman =

Lisa Coleman may refer to:

- Lisa Coleman (actress) (born 1970), British actress
- Lisa Coleman (musician) (born 1960), American musician
- Lisa Ann Coleman (1975–2014), American woman executed in Texas
