= William Higgins Coleman =

William Higgins Coleman (18 July 1812 – 12 September 1863) was an English botanist.

== Life ==
Coleman was educated at St John's College, Cambridge, where he graduated B. A. in 1836, M.A. in 1838, and was ordained deacon and priest by Kaye, bishop of Lincoln, in 1840. Becoming a master at Christ's Hospital, Hertford, he was engaged from 1840 to 1847 with the Rev. R. H. Webb in preparing the Flora Hertfordiensis (London, 1849). In 1847 he became assistant-master in the grammar school, Ashby-de-la-Zouch, Leicestershire.

Coleman died at Burton-on-Trent.

== Works ==
In 1834, Coleman was author, in conjunction with John William Colenso, of Examples in Arithmetic and Algebra (Cambridge).

The Flora Hertfordiensis contains an "Introduction on the Physical Geography and Botanical Divisions of the County", by Coleman, written in 1846, which is the first case in which a county flora was distributed into river-basin districts; and appendices (1) on this system, embodying the substance of a paper "On the Geographical Distribution of British Plants" in The Phytologist (1848, iii. 217); and (2) on Oenanthe fluviatilis, which he was the first to diagnose (English Botany Supplement, 2944, and Ann. Nat. Hist. v. 13, 188, t. 3).

Coleman also added Carex × boenninghausiana, Weihe, to the British list in 1842 (Eng. Bot. Sup. 2910) and Rubus colemanni was dedicated to him by the Rev. A. Bloxam. In 1851, in conjunction with Mr. Webb, he published a supplement to the Flora Hertfordiensis, and a second in 1859; and he also contributed notes upon mosses and flowering plants to the flora of the district surrounding Tutbury and Burton-on-Trent, by Edwin Brown, in Sir Oswald Mosley's Natural History of Tutbury, London, 1863.

Having "been long engaged in minute and extensive researches ... for the purpose of illustrating the more striking and difficult of the poetical passages of the Old Testament," he published in the Journal of Biblical Literature for July 1863 an elaborate paper on "The Eighteenth Chapter of Isaiah", which was reprinted with others, after his death, under the title of "Biblical Papers; being Remains of the Rev. W. H. Coleman", London.

Among his papers were found fragments of treatises on the Sinaitic inscriptions, and on the geology of the midland district.
