= John V. Coleman =

West Virginia state legislator

John V. Coleman (1874 - ?) was a coal miner and state legislator in West Virginia. He served in the West Virginia House of Delegates in 1920. He was one of four African Americans who were elected to represent Fayette County, West Virginia in the House of Delegates from 1896 to 1918.
