= Peter Coleman (disambiguation) =

Peter Coleman may also refer to:

- Peter Coleman (1928–2019), Australian writer and politician
- Peter Coleman (bishop) (1928–2001), Bishop of Crediton
- Peter Tali Coleman (1919–1997), Governor of American Samoa
- Peter Coleman (footballer) (born 1944), Scottish footballer
- Peter T. Coleman (academic) (born 1959), social psychologist and researcher
- Peter Coleman (sailor), American sailor

== See also ==
- Peter Colman (born 1944), biologist
- Peter Coleman-Wright (born 1958), Australian baritone
