= Robert S. Coleman =

Robert S. Coleman (born 1959) is an American chemistry professor and researcher. Coleman was a faculty member at both Ohio State University and the University of South Carolina. At Ohio State, he was on the faculty in the Department of Chemistry from 1996 to 2012, having moved to Ohio State as an associate professor from the University of South Carolina. At USC, Coleman taught as assistant professor from 1989 to 1995, and then as associate professor (with tenure) from 1995 to 1996. In 1996, he accepted a faculty position at Ohio State University to teach Organic Chemistry, where he was an associate professor from 1996 until 2000. He was promoted to full professor in 2000, teaching Organic Chemistry up until his retirement in 2012. He received his Ph.D. degree working with Professor Dale L. Boger (then at Purdue), completing the first total synthesis of the antitumor agent CC-1065. He was subsequently an NIH postdoctoral fellow at Yale University with Professor Samuel J. Danishefsky, where he completed (with M. Paz Cabal), the first total synthesis of the aglycone of the antitumor agent calicheamicin.

== Research ==
Coleman's independent research contributions include:

- Accomplished the first total chemical synthesis of the novel antitumor agent azinomycin A
- Developed the first synthesis of DNA containing sulfur-bearing nucleosides
- Developed the first stereocontrolled total synthesis of the kinase inhibitor calphostin A
- Developed the first computer generated model of an azinomycin B/DNA crosslink
- Developed the first fluorescent nucleotide probe for studying ultrafast DNA dynamics
- Published the first comprehensive study of the DNA binding properties of azinomycin B
- Developed a novel hetero-bis-metallated butadiene for the synthesis of polyene natural products, including the first total synthesis of the antitumor agent lucilactaene and 2'-O-methylmyxalamide D.
