= Alan Coleman (cricketer) =

English cricketer and coach

Personal information
- Full name: Alan James Coleman
- Born: 13 December 1983 (age 42); Ashford, Middlesex, England
- Batting: Right-handed
- Bowling: Right-arm fast-medium
- Role: Bowler

Domestic team information
- Years: Team
- 2002: Middlesex Cricket Board
- 2002: Dorset
- 2001–2002: Middlesex

Career statistics
| Competition | List A |
|---|---|
| Matches | 4 |
| Runs scored | 29 |
| Batting average | – |
| 100s/50s | –/– |
| Top score | 14* |
| Balls bowled | 97 |
| Wickets | – |
| Bowling average | – |
| 5 wickets in innings | – |
| 10 wickets in match | – |
| Best bowling | – |
| Catches/stumpings | 2/– |
- Source: Cricinfo, 15 November 2011

Alan James Coleman (born 13 December 1983, Ashford, Middlesex) is an English cricket administrator.

He is the current Middlesex Director of Cricket.

== Coaching career ==
In October 2021 he was appointed interim head coach of Middlesex following the removal of Stuart Law.

He was appointed as the club's first Head of Men's Performance Cricket in November 2021 before his promotion to Director of Cricket on 11 November 2022.

He has also coached the Middlesex Cricket Academy and the Middlesex 2nd XI.

== Playing career ==
Coleman represented Middlesex, the Middlesex Cricket Board and Dorset as a right-handed batsman and right-arm medium-fast bowler.

He made his 1st XI debut for Middlesex in a List A match against Sussex in the 2001 Norwich Union League.

He made two further appearances in that season's competition against Hampshire and Glamorgan, while in the following season's competition he appeared once against Gloucestershire. In his four List A appearances for Middlesex, he scored 29 runs with a high score of 14 not out. With the ball, he bowled a total of 16.1 wicketless overs.

Also during the 2002 season, Coleman played a single MCCA Knockout Trophy match each for Dorset against Devon and the Middlesex Cricket Board against the Northamptonshire Cricket Board.
