= Justice Coleman =

Justice Coleman may refer to:

- Benjamin Wilson Coleman (1869–1939), associate justice of the Supreme Court of Nevada
- Daniel Coleman (judge) (1801–1857), associate justice of the Alabama Supreme Court
- James P. Coleman (1914–1991), associate justice of the Supreme Court of Mississippi
- James S. Coleman (judge) (1906–1987), associate justice of the Alabama Supreme Court
- Josiah D. Coleman (born 1972), associate justice of the Supreme Court of Mississippi
- Mary S. Coleman (1914–2001), associate justice of the Supreme Court of Michigan
- Thomas W. Coleman (1833–1920), associate justice of the Alabama Supreme Court

== See also ==
- Judge Coleman (disambiguation)
