= Coltman =

Coltman is a surname, and may refer to:

- Amelia Coltman (born 1996), British skeleton racer
- Bob Coltman (born 1937), American singer
- Constance Coltman (1889–1969), English congregational minister
- Gary Coltman (born 1965), English cyclist
- Sir Leycester Coltman (1938–2003), British ambassador
- Liam Coltman (born 1990), New Zealand rugby union player
- Robert Coltman (1862–1931), American physician
- William Coltman (1891–1974), English recipient of the Victoria Cross
