= Bully Hay =

Australian rock and roots musician

- Born: Jonathon Coleman
- Origin: Tasmania, Australia
- Genres: Rock; blues and roots
- Occupations: Musician; singer-songwriter
- Instruments: Vocals; guitar
- Website: www.bullyhay.com

Bully Hay (born Jonathon Coleman) is an Australian singer-songwriter from Hobart, Tasmania. Coleman's father introduced him to guitar at age 14. He is self-taught and performed in bands and as a solo artist before settling on Bully Hay as his performing name. Hay's second studio album Anywhere But Here (March 2026) debuted at number 31 on the ARIA Charts.

== Career ==
On 30 October 2024, Hay released his debut studio album Black Dogs & Songbirds; an album about change, self-reflection and life's highs and lows.

Hay's second studio album Anywhere But Here was released in March 2026.

== Discography ==
=== Studio albums ===
List of albums, with selected details and chart positions
Title	Album details	Peak chart positions
Title	Album details	AUS
Black Dogs & Songbirds	Released: 30 October 2024; Format: LP, CDr, digital; Label: Bully Hay	—
Anywhere But Here	Released: 6 March 2026; Format: CD, LP, digital; Label: Bully Hay	31
