= Chris Coleman (artist) =

American digital artist and arts educator

- Born: Christopher Coleman; West Virginia
- Education: State University of New York at Buffalo, West Virginia University
- Known for: Interactive art installations using technology
- Website: digitalcoleman.com

Chris Coleman is an American digital artist and arts educator known for his sculptures, multimedia installations and open-source advocacy.

His works include The Magnitude of the Continental Divides (2009) and Unclaimed (2015), an interactive installation created with partner Laleh Mehran.

He is the founder and director of the Clinic for Open Source Arts, an organization dedicated to sustaining open source creative coding tools.

== Biography ==
Coleman was born in West Virginia. He attended West Virginia University for five years, studying engineering, before completing a Bachelor of Fine Arts in Sculpture. He moved to New York and earned a Master of Fine Arts degree at the State University of New York at Buffalo.

Coleman's work The Magnitude of the Continental Divides, an experimental video exploring themes of nationalism and war, was selected in 2009 by a jury chaired by actress Isabella Rossellini to win the Metropolis Art Prize, awarded by Internet television platform Babelgum. The video was played on three screens in Times Square. It won Best Experimental Film at the Festivus Film Festival in Denver, Colorado.

His interactive installation Unclaimed, a production with Laleh Mehran, was shown at the 2015 Biennial of the Americas at the Museum of Contemporary Art Denver.

He founded the Clinic for Open Source Arts (COSA) in 2015 through the University of Denver, where he was Professor of Emergent Digital Practices. COSA has been sustained with grants from the Knight Foundation and the National Endowment for the Arts.

In 2026, he was named Interim Director of the Arts and Humanities AI Institute at Ohio State University.

Coleman directs the Advanced Computing Center for the Arts and Design in the Department of Art at Ohio State University.
