= Ronald Coleman =

Ronald Coleman may refer to:

- Ronald Coleman, real name of OG Ron C (born 1973), American DJ, radio personality, record producer, and entertainment- and management company executive
- Ronald Coleman (basketball), American college basketball coach
- Ron Coleman (politician) (born 1941), American politician
- Ronald S. Coleman (born 1948), American Marine Corps lieutenant general
- Ronnie Coleman (born 1964), American professional bodybuilder
- Ronnie Coleman (American football) (born 1951), American NFL player

== See also ==
- Ronald Colman (1891–1958), English actor
