= Margot Valerie Coleman =

Margot Valerie Coleman is a judge from the United Kingdom. She was appointed as District Judge (Magistrates' Courts) with her appointment to take effect from 7 February 2005.

In May 2019, she ordered former Secretary of State for Foreign and Commonwealth Affairs Boris Johnson to appear in court to face allegations that he lied to the public during the 2016 Brexit referendum campaign.

In 2015, she was also in the news when she refused to extradite an alleged American paedophile to California who had been wanted by the FBI since 2007 for sexually abusing a boy under the age of 14 for five years, stating that the extradition would be a "flagrant denial" of the European convention on human rights. This judgement was later upheld by Lord Justice Aikens and Mr Justice Holroyde. In 2017 she did order his extradition, a decision which was upheld in June 2018 by Lord Burnett, the Lord Chief Justice and Mr. Justice Dingemans.
