= Charles Coleman (music producer) =

American rapper

- Also known as: CharlesInCharge
- Origin: Minneapolis, Minnesota, US
- Genres: Hip hop, R&B
- Occupations: producer, songwriter, artist
- Instruments: Akai MPC, Logic, Pro Tools
- Years active: 2001–present
- Website: www.CharlesInChargeMusic.com

Charles Coleman, "CharlesInCharge", is an American record producer and songwriter. He began his musical journey as a member of the group, ICON. It was with the group that CharlesInCharge began to professionally produce and write music. To create he uses an AKAI MPC Studio, Universal Audio Apollo Twin, and a Macbook Pro.

In 2015, CharlesInCharge produced a song for the NBA's Golden State Warriors. The song "Dub Nation (Locked N' Loaded)" performed by Bay Area rapper Rich Cole references the team's 2015 postseason run.

CharlesInCharge has worked with the music legend Prince. He co-wrote "Under The Same Cloud" with Kip Blackshire on a song that featured Prince and "The Fonky Baldheadz", the opening band for Prince's 2001 "Hit'n Run Tour".

Using his first writer name he co-wrote and co-produced for the Unsigned: Twin Cities CD. The tracks "All I Do" and "Got It Locked" are performed by Alex Whitfield. The project was sponsored by Best Buy and Northwest Airlines.

In 2017, CharlesInCharge released his debut solo single, Cheat Code produced by Mindkilla.

He has collaborated with numerous successful musicians and brands including DJ Skee, Jake One, Focus…, Too $hort, Tory Lanez, 1500 or Nothin', Locksmith, Brooke Jean, Koen Heldens, Trevor Lawrence Jr., Tony Gaskins, Cleveland P. Jones, Kaydence, Marcus Phillips, G-Technology and Wrike.

== Discography ==
- Features group projects, solo projects, production credits and features

=== CharlesInCharge Solo Projects ===
- List of songs performed by CharlesInCharge

Year	Title	Produced By
2017	"Cheat Code"	Mindkilla

=== CharlesInCharge Collaborations ===
- CP (Co-Produced), CW (Co-Writer), PA (Performing Artist), Producer, N/A (Not Available)
- List of features with other performing artists, showing year released and song title

Year	Artist(s)	Title	Participation
2017	Keak Da Sneak ft. JT The Bigga Figga	"She's in the Building"	CP, CW
2008	San Quinn	"Wind It Up"	CP, CW
2014	Balance ft. Big Rich	"Good As $"	CP, CW
2005	Kip Blackshire ft.The Fonky Bald Headz & Prince	"Under The Same Cloud"	CP, CW
2015	J Isaac Moore	"The Promotion"	CP, CW
2001	Unsigned Twin Cities	"All I do"	CP, CW
2001	Unsigned Twin Cities	"Got It Locked”	CP, CW
2016	Wrike Commercial	Wrike Commercial Theme	CP with Focus..., CW
