= Coleman High School =

Coleman High School may refer to one of the following public secondary schools in the United States:

- John A. Coleman Catholic High School, Hurley, New York
- Coleman High School (Arkansas), a segregated high school in Pine Bluff, Arkansas from 1915 to 1971
- Coleman High School (Texas), Coleman, Texas
- Coleman High School (Mississippi), Greenville, from which judge Leslie D. King graduated
