= Cathy Colman =

American poet, teacher and editor

Cathy Colman is an American poet, teacher and editor. Her first book, Borrowed Dress, won the 2001 Felix Pollak Prize for Poetry from the University of Wisconsin Press, chosen by Mark Doty. It made the Los Angeles Times bestseller list in October, 2001. Her second book, Beauty's Tattoo, was published by Tebot Bach Publications in 2009. Her third book, Time Crunch waa published by What Books Press, in October, 2019.

== Education ==
Colman began her education at University of California, Berkeley in 1969 as an art major and then transferred to San Francisco State University to study writing under the poet Stan Rice. She received her B.A. and M.A. (with honors) from San Francisco State University.

== Career ==
Colman was a freelance reviewer for The New York Times Book Review and reviewed photography and art for Artweek Magazine and Angeles Magazine. She worked as a personal assistant for Martin Scorsese during Raging Bull, as well as for director Daniel Petrie and comedian Alan King. She was a script doctor for screenwriters such as Callie Khouri, Scott Frank and Ed Solomon.

She taught writing workshops at U.C.L.A.'s The Writers Program, University of Southern California and The College of Arts and Crafts in Oakland, California.

Her poems have appeared in The Huffington Post, The Gettysburg Review, Ploughshares, The Colorado Review, Barrow Street and elsewhere. They have been translated into Italian, Russian and Croatian.

== Critical response ==
Writing in OmniVerse, Elena Karina Byrne said of Colman's work: "Cathy Colman’s new work includes poems that view illness as this unwelcome force that also creates the exiled “other” self. The second poem in her book Call Me When You Get There, “Half the Landscape Standing in for the Whole,” opens the metaphorical trap door, not to the basement or attic, but to the sky" Her Borrowed Dress was described by Carol Muske-Dukes in the Los Angeles Times' as "a kind of ecstatic rumination".

== Honors and awards ==
- 1975 The Browning Award for Poetry
- 1995 Asher Montandon Award for Poetry
- 2001 Felix Pollak Award for Poetry
- 2015 List of Indispensable Women Poets from Quill's Edge Press

== Published works ==
- Borrowed Dress. University of Wisconsin Press. 2001. ISBN 0299175405
- Beauty's Tattoo. Tebot Bach Publications. 2009. ISBN 9781893670419
- Chance of a Ghost Anthology. Helicon Nine Editions. 2005. ISBN 1884235387
- Time Crunch What Books Press. 2019 ISBN 9781532341465
