= Coleman House (Lewes, Delaware) =

Historic house in Delaware, United States

- U.S. National Register of Historic Places
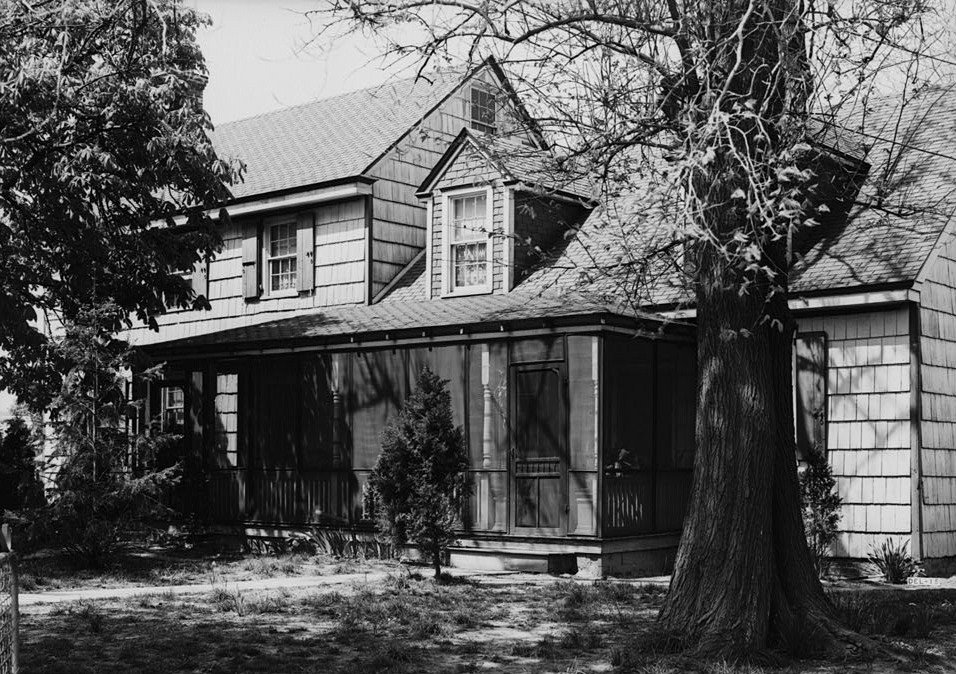
- Coleman House, HABS Photo, April 1936

- Location within Delaware Location within the United States
- Location: 422 Kings Hwy., Lewes, Delaware
- Coordinates: 38°46′12″N 75°8′31″W
- Area: 1 acre (0.40 ha)
- Built: c. 1815
- NRHP reference No.: 77000392
- Added to NRHP: April 11, 1977

Coleman House is a historic home located at Lewes, Sussex County, Delaware. It dates to about 1815, and consists of a two-story, three-bay, frame main section with 1 1/2-story, frame wing. Both sections are sheathed in cypress and have gable roofs. It is an outstanding example of the early-19th-century rural architecture once common in the Lewes area.

It was added to the National Register of Historic Places in 1977.
