= Vince Coleman =

Vince Coleman may refer to:

- Vince Coleman (baseball) (born 1961), American baseball player
- Vince Coleman (train dispatcher) (1872–1917), Canadian train dispatcher killed in the Halifax Explosion

== See also ==
- Vincent Coleman (1900–1971), American actor
