= Steve Colman =

American dramatist

Steve Colman is an American award-winning poet, playwright, producer, and director.

== Biography ==
Colman was the inaugural poet on the Peabody Award-winning television series Russell Simmons presents Def Poetry Jam on HBO. He co-wrote and co-starred in the Tony Award-winning Def Poetry Jam on Broadway." Colman co-conceived and assistant directed Sarah Jones's 2006 Tony Award-winning show Bridge and Tunnel, which was originally produced Off-Broadway by Meryl Streep.

His theater work, including his collaborations with Jones, have garnered two Drama Desk nominations, an Obie, and a Theater World Award. Colman co-authored Burning Down the House (SoftSkull Press), and Russell Simmons' Def Poetry Jam on Broadway and More (Atria Books).

== Works ==
- Colman, Stephen; Procope, Lynne, Bonair-Agard, Gonzalez, Guy; Olson, Alix. Burning Down The House. New York: Soft Skull Press, 1998.
- Simmons, Danny. Russell Simmons Def Poetry Jam on Broadway...and More. New York: Atria Books, 2003.
