= Coleman, Ohio =

Unincorporated community in Ohio, U.S.

Coordinates: 40°47′46″N 80°48′47″W

Coleman is an unincorporated community in Columbiana County, Ohio.

== History ==
A train station called Coleman was established in 1890. Coleman was settled by coal miners during the oil and coal boom of the 1890s. There was a hotel, a store and some houses which were all abandoned by 1930.
