= Coleman Parsons =

American writer and professor of literature

Coleman O. Parsons (1905–1991) was a scholar, writer and professor of literature, last as Professor Emeritus of English at City College of New York.

== Biography ==
Parsons was born in Ripley, West Virginia. He attended University of Southern California, University of Chicago before receiving his an A.B. (Artium Baccalaureus, A.B. or B.A.) at Columbia University and held a doctorate from Yale University.

Parsons, a premier authority on Scottish literature and culture, joined the City College faculty in 1937 and began teaching there full-time in 1947. Parsons was known as an excellent and challenging professor who participated heavily in intellectual and public life outside of the classroom. He was an active member and leader in the Andiron Club, an exclusive cultural and fraternal organization in New York City. Parsons was also an active Freemason.

He was the author of one of the most important critical works on Sir Walter Scott and nineteenth century Scottish literature, "Witchcraft and Demonology in Scott's Fiction," published in 1964, and wrote extensively for academic journals in the United States, Scotland, England and Germany.

== Death and legacy ==
In June 1991 Parsons died at his home in Manhattan following complications while recovering from a stroke. Numerous scholarships and awards are named in his honor. His papers are held at Columbia University to benefit researchers.
