= Nick Coleman =

Nicholas Coleman or Nick Coleman may refer to:

- Nicholas D. Coleman (Nicholas Daniel Coleman, 1800–1874), U.S. Representative from Kentucky
- Nick Coleman (British writer) (born 1960), British writer
- Nick Coleman (columnist) (1950–2018), American journalist in Minnesota
- Nick Coleman (politician) (Nicholas David Coleman, 1925–1981), American politician from Minnesota
