= Ralph Pallen Coleman =

American painter and illustrator

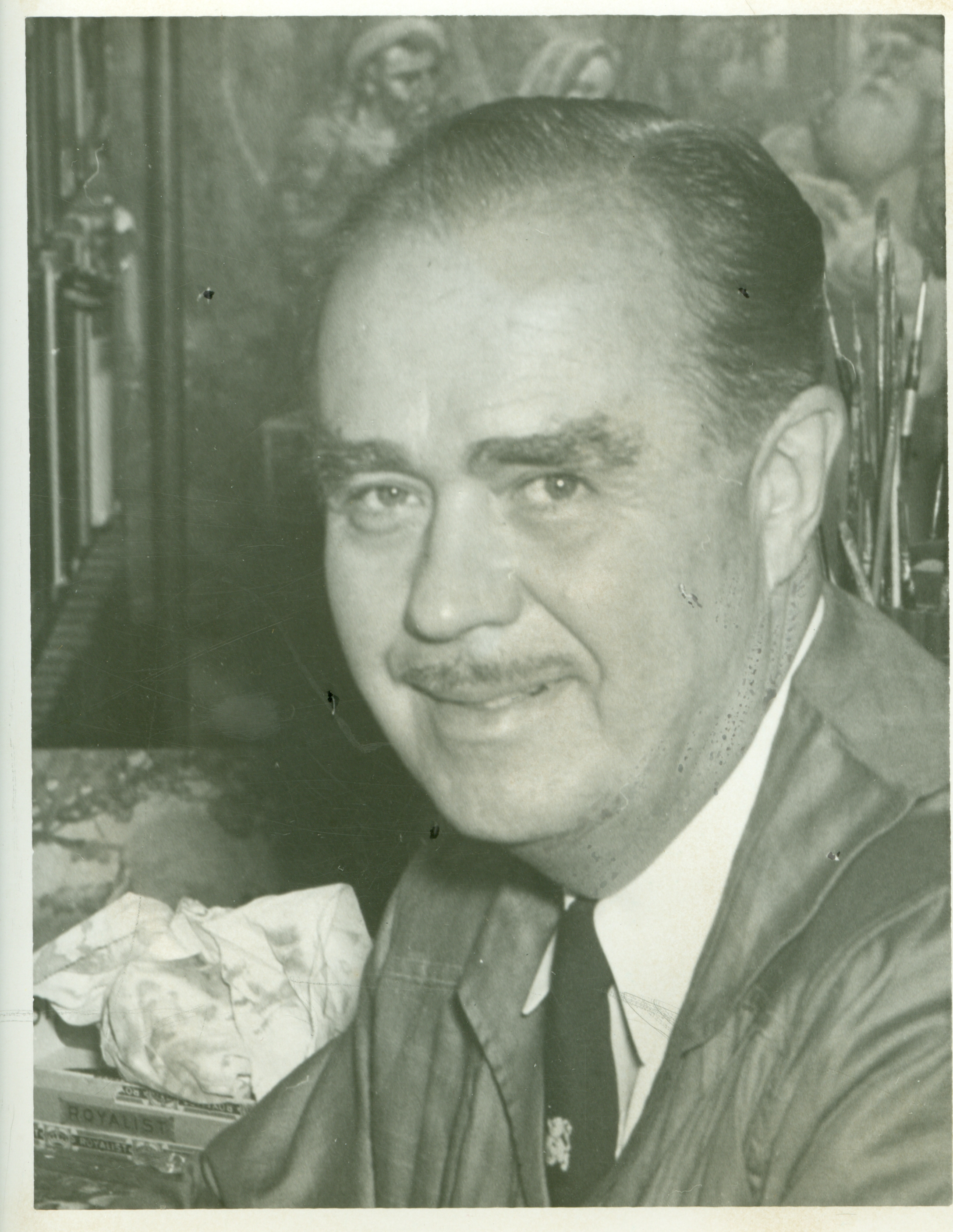
- Ralph Pallen Coleman in the Studio
- Born: June 6, 1892
- Died: April 3, 1968 (aged 75); Philadelphia, Pennsylvania
- Occupations: Painter, illustrator
- Years active: 1901–1968
- Notable work: The Eternal Christ

Ralph Pallen Coleman (June 27, 1892 – April 3, 1968) was an American painter and illustrator. His career spanned more than half a century during which he illustrated stories for many magazines, and later, religious illustrations and paintings which provided images of Christianity to millions of people during the 1950s–1960s. A native of Philadelphia, Pennsylvania, he grew up and lived there throughout his 75 years.

== Early life ==
Ralph Pallen Coleman was born to William Herr Coleman, a Philadelphia grocer, and Emma Coleman, a saloon keeper. He had one brother, William B. Coleman. Coleman attended grade school at the Camac School in North Philadelphia. Initially, he was athletically inclined and organized baseball teams at his home church, Bethlehem Presbyterian Church. His earliest existing drawing is a pencil sketch of Revolutionary soldiers that he drew in 1901, when he was nine years old. While attending Central High School which specialized in the classic teachings of Latin and Greek, he was awarded a partial scholarship to art school and left high school early. He received his formal art education at the Pennsylvania Museum School of Industrial Art which was then part of the Philadelphia Museum of Art. It is now an independent university called The University of the Arts. It was here that he learned the formal techniques of draftsmanship under the influence of Walter H.Everett, a teacher of illustration and one of the most highly regarded technicians of his time. Coleman displayed his facility for drawing the human face and figure and won first prize in a life drawing competition. Shortly thereafter, in 1913, he decided to strike out on his own by leaving school and taking a small studio, with two other students at 6th & Walnut Streets just a few blocks from the school and across the street from Curtis Publishing Company. Early assignments were not easy to come by for the illustrator. His first sale — a small line drawing to the American Sunday School Union — brought in $7.50. Sometimes, Coleman turned author so that he would end up both writing and illustrating his own stories.

== Magazine illustrations ==
Coleman formally got his education at the School of Industrial Art in Philadelphia. However, he never completed those studies. In 1917 he entered the commercial field due to financial need and joined the commercial art world of periodical publication that was flourishing in Philadelphia at the time. At this point, much of Coleman's work was for newspapers, including the Philadelphia Inquirer and the now defunct North American; for book jackets; and for religious publishing houses. During the First World War he executed a variety of war-related posters and illustrations including his first cover illustration for Literary Digest. It was a cover in 1917 featuring a doughboy "going over the top" in France. "Going over the top" refers to when a soldier would attempt to cross "no man's land" between two opposing trenches. During World War I he worked in the Marine Camouflage Department where he and several other artists directed the painting of both combat and merchant vessels. In 1915 that Coleman achieved a lifelong ambition when he sold his first illustration to the Saturday Evening Post. "High, Low and Close" was the first story which Ralph Pallen Coleman ever illustrated for The Saturday Evening Post. He delivered the black and white picture to the Post on May 12, 1915. Subsequently, he did scores of paintings for the Post, then the outstanding magazine in the United States and the flagship publication of Curtis Publishing Co.

During the Twenties, magazines and periodicals kept him busy turning out over 100 illustrations a year. He started the decade by illustrating for the popular "pulps" of the period. By the mid-twenties he was a regular contributor to Liberty, Holland's Magazine, Maclean's, Blue Book, Green Book and Short Stories magazines. His illustrations captured the spirit of the times, most notably in 1922 when he was commissioned to do the illustrations for the serial "Flaming Youth," a phrase that became the symbol of that gay and gaudy decade. In 1924, Coleman completed 178 illustrations for various publications. But he would have to wait until the Depression Years to be a regular in the "big leagues" of Curtis, Crowell-Collier and Hearst Publishing Companies. By the end of the decade, he had become a regular contributor to Cosmopolitan, the flagship magazine of the Hearst magazine empire, and its sister publication, Good Housekeeping.

During the Thirties, Ralph Pallen Coleman's career flourished with assignments to illustrate stories for W. Somerset Maugham, Louis Bromfield, F. Scott Fitzgerald, and Booth Tarkington, Sir Phillip Gibbs, Rex Beach, Clarence Buddington Kelland, and Edison Marshall. In 1931, after a hiatus of four years, Coleman returned to the pages of The Saturday Evening Post, still being edited by the legendary George Horace Lorimer. Much to his surprise, he began receiving assignments from the Post's archrival, Colliers. During the same week, Coleman had illustrations running in both the Post and Colliers. It was during this period that he began to use his brush to present his viewers with exotic scenes of faraway places they would never be able to visit in person. Quickly, he became one of the most sought-after illustrators of exotic stories laid in the South Seas, the Far East and Africa. Using extensive photographic research provided by magazines like National Geographic, the artist turned out a body of work depicting pith-helmeted explorers, bare-breasted natives, lithe jungle cats native to a Tropicana that he personally had never visited.

Many of his illustrations from this period carried a strong outline or vignette that clearly set the artwork off from the text that it was illustrating. This was one of the defining techniques of illustration during that era. This vignetting became a trademark of his work in publication. Like many of his fellow illustrators of the period, he was integrally involved in the tools of the trade: from making brushes, paints, easels, picture frames, and the photographic process to capture the images from which he painted.

== Religious illustrations ==
Ralph Pallen Coleman, a lifelong Presbyterian was an elder and trustee at Grace Presbyterian Church in Jenkintown, Pennsylvania. Religious images were always very powerful messages for him and he was able to integrate this passion into his professional career. His first commission as an illustrator was for a drawing at the request of the American Sunday School Union in 1914. Even during the Twenties and Thirties, when his output was primarily for the popular magazines, Coleman turned out a steady, if limited, stream of religious and Biblical paintings for Providence Lithograph Co. and various denominational publishing houses. But it was not until the 1940s when he was well into middle age, that Coleman embarked on a virtually new career — that of Biblical and religious artist, producing more than 400 religious paintings and murals.

In his later years after 1942, Coleman was able to use his illustrating skills to present a realistic kaleidoscope of hundreds of Biblical illustrations, culminating in the most complete series of paintings on the life of Christ ever done by a contemporary artist.

One of this most widely distributed works, "The Eternal Christ," was painted in 1942. The painting was reproduced and several million copies were distributed to both civilians and servicemen during World War II. With the advent of actual photography being able to be reproduced in the periodicals of the day, the "slick" magazine illustrator had to turn his talents primarily to paintings of a religious or Biblical nature.

Coleman’s interpretation of Jesus was influenced by Coleman’s studies on historical religious illustrations. His art style is known to always represent the subject as a young man, which was common in all his religious artworks. This can be seen from many of his major works like his 17 paintings for Life of Jesus by Donald F. Irvin, 57 paintings for The Way, The Truth and The Life, and 42 illustrations for Hurlbut’s Story of the Bible.

In his later years, Mr. Coleman designed a series of stained glass windows on the life of Christ for Grace Presbyterian Church and lectured extensively in the Philadelphia area showing slides of his paintings. Coleman’s work can still be viewed in many Philadelphia area venues. His commissioned works set the tone for the Whitemarsh Park chapel. His work in stained glass adorns the Grace Presbyterian Church in Jenkintown, Pennsylvania. A collection of his later work and papers resides in the Special Collections Research Center at the Syracuse University.

== Personal life ==
Ralph Pallen Coleman was born to William Herr Coleman, a Philadelphia grocer, and Emma Coleman, a saloon keeper. He had one brother, William B. Coleman. Coleman married Florence L. Haeberle of Philadelphia on June 2, 1917, and they had one son, Ralph P. Coleman Jr. He was a founding director and vice president of the Over-the-Counter Securities Fund, Inc., of Oreland, Pennsylvania and a founding officer of the Baederwood, Inc. land holding company. He served as a governor of the Health Club of the Philadelphia Young Men’s Christian Association, the Huguenot Society of Pennsylvania and a member of the National Society of Mural Painters and the Society of Illustrators. He died in Philadelphia at the age of 75 on April 3, 1968.
