= Samy Colman =

Moroccan equestrian

Personal information
- Nationality: Morocco
- Born: 23 April 1996 (age 28); Caen, Normandy, France

Sport
- Country: Morocco
- Sport: Show jumping

Samy Colman (born 23 April 1996) is a Moroccan equestrian.

== Career highlights ==
- March 2017: winner of the CSI1 in Cagnes-sur-Mer (1.35m) with Baloucetta.
- May 2017: winner of the Grand Prix Top Junior Talents (under 25) in La Baule with Simara Alia
- September 2018: second in the Grand Prix of His Majesty King Mohammed VI at the Official Showjumping Competition in Tetouan

== 2020 Tokyo Summer Olympics ==
The rider qualified to represent Morocco in the 2020 Tokyo Summer Olympics and was slated to compete in showjumping events alongside Abdelkebir Ouaddar, Ghali Boukaa and Ali Ahrach. Colman had to announce his withdrawal from the 2020 Olympic Games after testing positive for COVID-19.
