= General Coleman =

General Coleman may refer to:

- Charles Coleman (British Army officer) (1903–1974), British Army lieutenant general
- Ronald S. Coleman (born 1948), U.S. Marine Corps lieutenant general

== See also ==
- Attorney General Coleman (disambiguation)
