= Herb Coleman =

Herb Coleman may refer to:

- Herb Coleman (center) (1923–1985), American football player
- Herb Coleman (defensive lineman) (born 1971), American football player
