= José Colman =

Paraguayan footballer (born 1985)

Personal information
- Full name: José Luis Castro Colman
- Date of birth: 10 November 1985 (age 40)
- Place of birth: Asunción, Paraguay
- Position: Defender

Team information
- Current team: A.C. Este

Senior career*
Years	Team	Apps	(Gls)
2008–2009	AS Cittadella	1	(0)
2009	Pro Vercelli	14	(0)
2009–2010	Pol. Alghero	23	(2)
2010–2012	A.C. Este	57	(5)
2012–2013	A.C. Marano A.S.D.	?	(?)
2013	A.C. Este	26	(0)
- * Club domestic league appearances and goals as of 2 March 2014 ‡ National team caps and goals as of 30 August 2012

José Luis Castro Colman (born 10 November 1985) is a Paraguayan international footballer who plays for A.C. Este, as a defender.
