= Clarence Kohlmann =

American keyboardist and composer

- Born: September 24, 1891; Philadelphia, Pennsylvania, US
- Died: December 13, 1944 (aged 53) Philadelphia, Pennsylvania, US
- Genres: Sacred
- Occupations: Musician, composer
- Instruments: Piano, organ

Clarence R. Kohlmann (September 24, 1891 – December 13, 1944) was an American keyboardist and composer. He achieved renown for his arrangements of sacred music for the piano and organ.

He was educated in public schools and in music with private tutors. At age 17, he began composing original hymns and arranging musical settings for psalms.

From 1924 until his death in 1944, he was the resident organist at the Ocean Grove Great Auditorium organ in Ocean Grove, New Jersey. His work, The Storm, a display piece for the Auditorium organ, is a medley of songs with sound effects. It portrays an approaching Civil War battle followed by the return of peace as the storm subsides. It was recorded there in 1929, performed by Kohlmann.

== Works ==
=== Arrangements and transcriptions ===
- "Just As I Am Without One Plea", by Charlotte Elliott, arr. for piano
- "I Love to Tell the Story", by William G. Fischer, arr. for handbells
- The Storm, composed for the Ocean Grove Auditorium (1926)
- "Nobody Knows the Trouble I've Seen", transcribed for organ
- "Silent Night", by Franz Gruber, arranged for organ (1936)
- "Silent Night", by Gruber, arranged for piano
- "Jerusalem the Golden", by Alexander Ewing, arr. for handbells
- "Sweet Hour of Prayer", by William Batchelder Bradbury, arr. for organ
- "All Hail the Power of Jesus' Name", by Oliver Holden, arr. for piano
- "The Messiah", by G. F. Handel, arr. for organ
- "The Boys in Brown from Our Old Home Town", arr. for piano

=== Original compositions ===
- The Moon Maiden, (musical, 1935, music), with Elsie Duncan Yale (book and lyrics)
- At the Tourist Camp (Dad's Vacation) (operetta book, 1937, music), with Elsie Duncan Yale (book and lyrics)
- The Angel Choir: A Christmas Services, with Forrest G. Walter (1931)
- "Easter Fantasy"
- An Old-Fashioned Charm: A Musical Comedy, with Juanita Austin (book and lyrics)
- "A song in my heart", words by Lizzie DeArmond
- "Christmas Fantasy"
- "Carillon at Sunset" (published 1947)
- "Chanson du Soir" (1941)
- "Enchanted Gardens"
- "Enchantment" (1933)
- "Festival Postlude"
- "France is Calling", with H. D. Shaiffer
- "Idyl of the Flowers" (1941)
- "Love Light - A Love Sonnet"
- "The Ocean Grove Usher's March", 1941
- "Out of the shadows", words by Mrs. J. I. McClelland (1935)
- "Silver Wings"
- "Star Kisses"
- "Sun of My Soul" (for handbells)
- "Sunshine and rain" with Charles H. Gabriel
- "Wings of Faith"

=== Collections ===
- Organ Transcriptions of Favorite Hymns (1944)
- Concert Transcriptions of Favorite Hymns for Piano
- Twenty Piano Duet Transcriptions of Favorite Hymns
- More Concert Transcriptions of Favorite Hymns (for piano)
- Album of Duets for Organ and Piano
