= Coleman Pond =

- Location within Georgia
- Location: Irwin County, Georgia
- Coordinates: 31°43′08″N 83°26′43″W
- Type: Lake
- Surface elevation: 84 m (276 ft)

Coleman Pond is a lake in the U.S. state of Georgia.

Coleman Pond was named after one Mr. Coleman, the original owner of the site.
