= Coleman Branch =

Stream in Tennessee, United States

Coordinates: 35°46′23″N 87°21′16″W

Coleman Branch is a stream off of Duck River in Hickman County, Tennessee, in the United States. It is a tributary to the Duck River.

== History ==
Coleman Branch was named for a pioneer who settled there before 1830.

== See also ==
- List of rivers of Tennessee
