= Thomas Coleman (disambiguation) =

Thomas Coleman (1598–1647) was an English clergyman and scholar.

Thomas Coleman may also refer to:

- Thomas Coleman (New York politician) (1808–1894), New York politician
- Thomas Coleman, better known as Tommy Shades or Thomas Hart, Australian DJ and electronic music producer
- Thomas B. Coleman (1795–1848), American mayor of Nashville, Tennessee
- Thomas E. Coleman (1893–1964), Wisconsin politician
- Thomas F. Coleman, professor of computer science and mathematics
- T. Michael Coleman, American bass player

== See also ==
- Tom Coleman (disambiguation)
