= Frank Fryer =

- Born: Frank Cunningham Fryer; 2 November 1886 Riccarton, Christchurch, New Zealand
- Died: 22 September 1958 (aged 71) Hastings, New Zealand
- School: Christ's College

Rugby union career
- Position: Wing
Provincial / State sides
Years	Team	Apps	(Points)
1905–10	Canterbury	25	
International career
Years	Team	Apps	(Points)
1907–08	New Zealand	4	(0)

Frank Cunningham Fryer (2 November 1886 – 22 September 1958) was a New Zealand rugby union player. His position of choice was wing three-quarter. Fryer was educated at Christ's College where he was a member of the 1st XV between 1902 and 1904. Fryer represented Canterbury at a provincial level, and was a member of the New Zealand national side, the All Blacks, from 1907 to 1908. He played nine matches for the All Blacks including four internationals.
