= Florian Kollmann =

German politician (born 1980)

Member of the Landtag of Baden-Württemberg
- Incumbent
- Assumed office 11 May 2026
- Constituency: Heidelberg

Personal details
- Born: 1980 (age 45–46)
- Party: Alliance 90/The Greens

Florian Kollmann (born 1980) is a German politician who was elected member of the Landtag of Baden-Württemberg in 2026. From 2013 to 2024, he served as co-chairman of Alliance 90/The Greens in Heidelberg.
