= Tom Coleman (film producer) =

American film producer

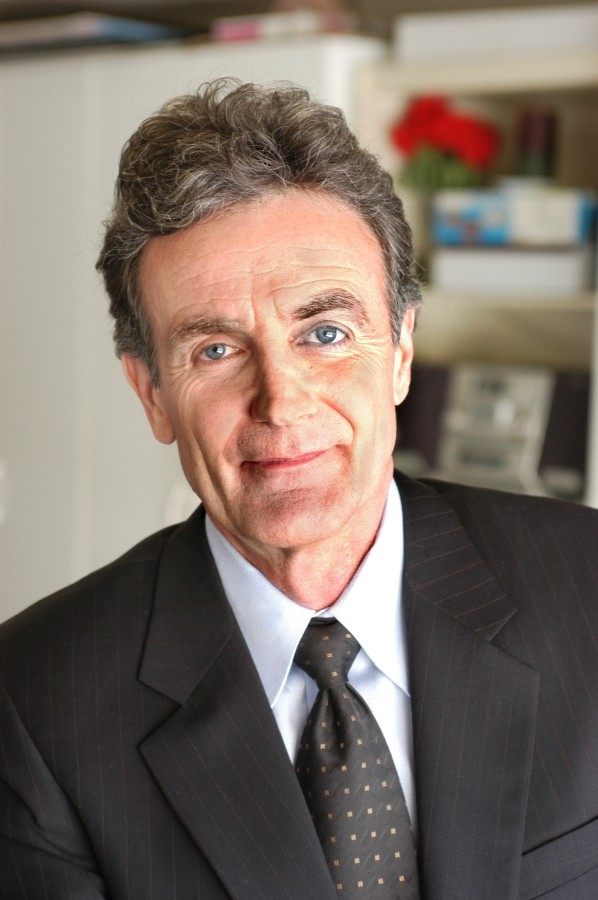
- Born: Thomas Joseph Coleman
- Other names: Thomas J. Coleman; T. Joseph Coleman; Hagan Thomas-Jones
- Occupations: Entrepreneur, Producer

Tom Coleman, also credited as Thomas J. Coleman and T. Joseph Coleman, founded the Atlantic Entertainment Group, private independent film and television company, in 1975 and served as its president. He became chairman and CEO of Prism Entertainment when the company merged with Atlantic in 1988. Coleman was chairman of Independent Entertainment Group. Rocket Pictures, an indie production company, was founded by Coleman in 1992. He is an Executive member of the Academy of Motion Picture Arts and Sciences, and an industry consultant for the Zurich Consulting Group based in Switzerland. In July 2001, he became CEO, President and director of Sun Network Group. Coleman is the Lead Producer of the musical ModRock.

Under his nom de plume, Hagan Thomas-Jones, Coleman is a member of the Dramatists Guild. He is currently CEO of Innovativ Media Group, a developer, producer and distributor of multi-media content. It has acquired many of the assets of Lux Digital Pictures including a library of feature motion pictures and, via New Broadway Cinema, produces adaptations of stage shows utilizing its trademarked DigiTheater™ virtual reality process. Innovativ also operates The Alien Channel on YouTube, in partnership with FullScreen, Inc., is developing the new web series Just Smart People, the customized movie title search destination VOD Movie Guide, and is a principal in the Film Finance Exchange.

== Partial filmography ==
Film	Year	Role
The Day the Music Died (Documentary)	1977	Producer
Madame Rosa(drama)	1978	Executive Producer
Valley Girl	1983	Executive Producer
Alphabet City	1984	Executive Producer
Night of the Comet	1984	Executive Producer
Teen Wolf	1985	Executive Producer
Roadhouse 66	1985	Executive Producer
Starchaser: The Legend of Orin	1985	Executive Producer
Nomads	1986	Executive Producer
The Adventures of the American Rabbit	1986	Executive Producer
Extremities	1986	Executive Producer
The Men’s Club	1986	Executive Producer
Modern Girls	1986	Executive Producer
Nutcracker: The Motion Picture	1986	Executive Producer
Wild Thing	1987	Executive Producer
Steele Justice	1987	Executive Producer
Summer Heat	1987	Executive Producer
The Garbage Pail Kids Movie	1987	Executive Producer
Teen Wolf Too	1987	Executive Producer
Cop	1988	Executive Producer
Patty Hearst	1988	Executive Producer
1969	1988	Executive Producer
It Came from the Sky	1999	Executive Producer
