= Coleman-Desha Plantation =

- U.S. National Register of Historic Places
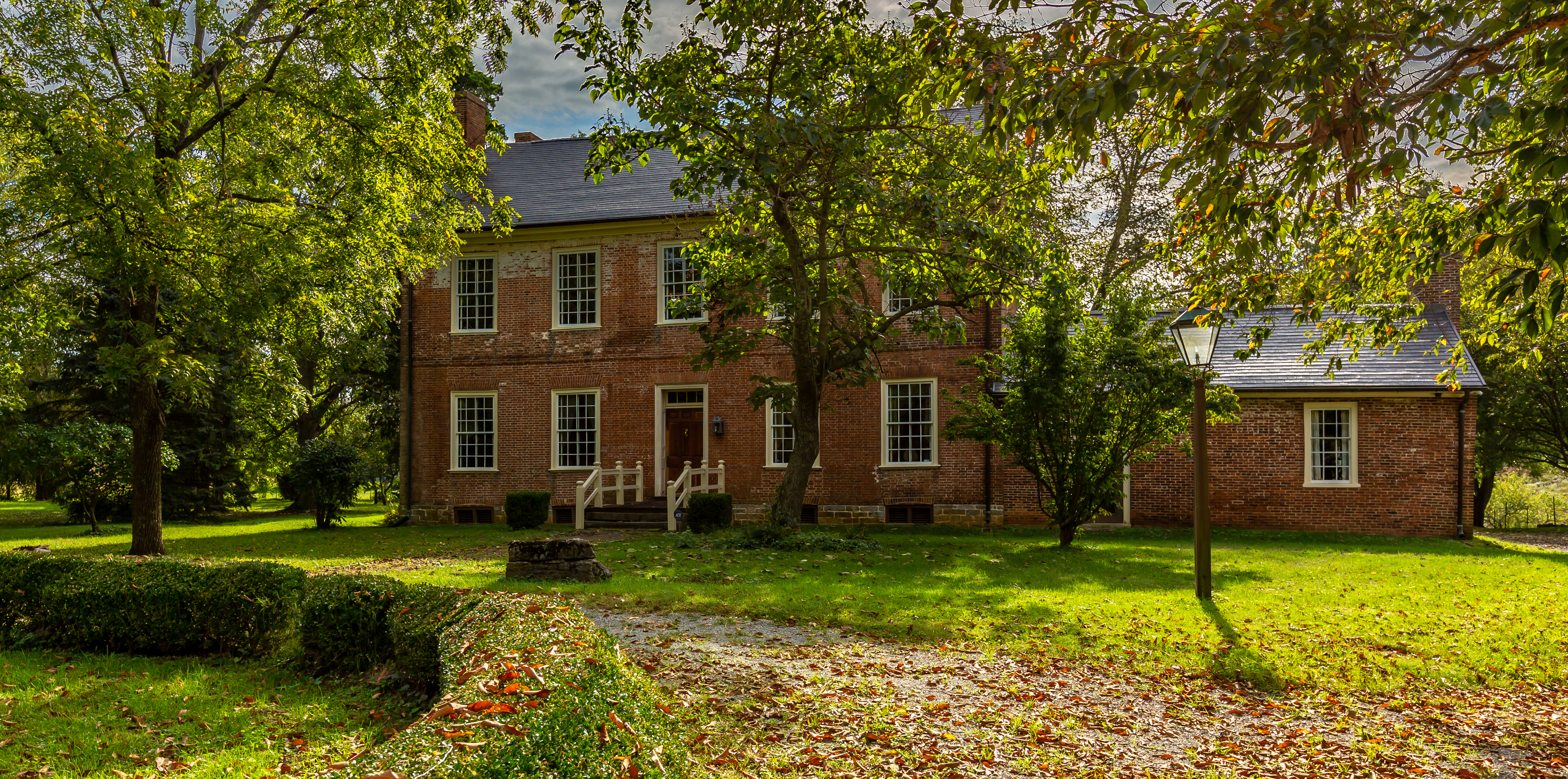

- Location within Kentucky Location within the United States
- Location: U.S. Route 62 E., Oddville Pike, 1 mile northeast of Cynthiana, Kentucky
- Coordinates: 38°24′00″N 84°16′20″W
- Area: 34 acres (14 ha)
- Built: c.1812
- Architectural style: Georgian, Early 19th century
- NRHP reference No.: 93000045
- Added to NRHP: February 26, 1993

The Coleman-Desha Plantation in Harrison County, Kentucky, near Cynthiana was listed on the National Register of Historic Places in 1993.

The main house, built in c. 1812, is Georgian in style. It has five-bay front and rear facades built of Flemish bond brick. The listing included four contributing buildings and two contributing structures: the main house and kitchen, a smokehouse, a springhouse, a double log crib barn (sheep barn), and a single log crib barn.
