= Andrew Colman =

British psychologist

Andrew M. Colman
- Born: 8 January 1944 (age 82); Johannesburg, South Africa
- Education: Rhodes University
- Awards: Fellow of the British Psychological Society since 1984
- Scientific career
- Fields: Psychology
- Workplaces: University of Leicester
- Thesis: Abstract and lifelike experimental games (1979)

Andrew Michael Colman (born 8 January 1944 in Johannesburg, South Africa) is a British psychologist known for his research on decision making and game theory.

== Career ==
Colman grew up in South Africa where he attended the University of Cape Town from which he was awarded a BA in Psychology in 1965 followed by an MA in 1968. In that year he participated in the sit-in during the Mafeje affair. He then worked for periods at both the University of Cape Town and Rhodes University before moving in 1970 to a post at the University of Leicester where he remained for the rest of his career. He was awarded a PhD by Rhodes University in 1979.

He has been a fellow of the British Psychological Society since 1984, and a fellow of the Higher Education Academy since 2016.
