= George Coleman (disambiguation) =

George Coleman (born 1935) is an American saxophonist and bandleader.

George Coleman may also refer to:

- George Coleman (athlete) (1916–2005), British racewalker
- George Drumgoole Coleman (1795–1844), Irish architect in Singapore
- George Preston Coleman (1870–1948), head of the Virginia Department of Transportation and mayor of Williamsburg, Virginia
- George W. Coleman (1867–1950), American publisher
- George William Coleman (1939–2024), American prelate of the Roman Catholic Church
- George Coleman, birth name of Bongo Joe Coleman (1923–1999), American musician

== See also ==
- George Colman (disambiguation)
