= Monte Colma =

Mountain in Italy

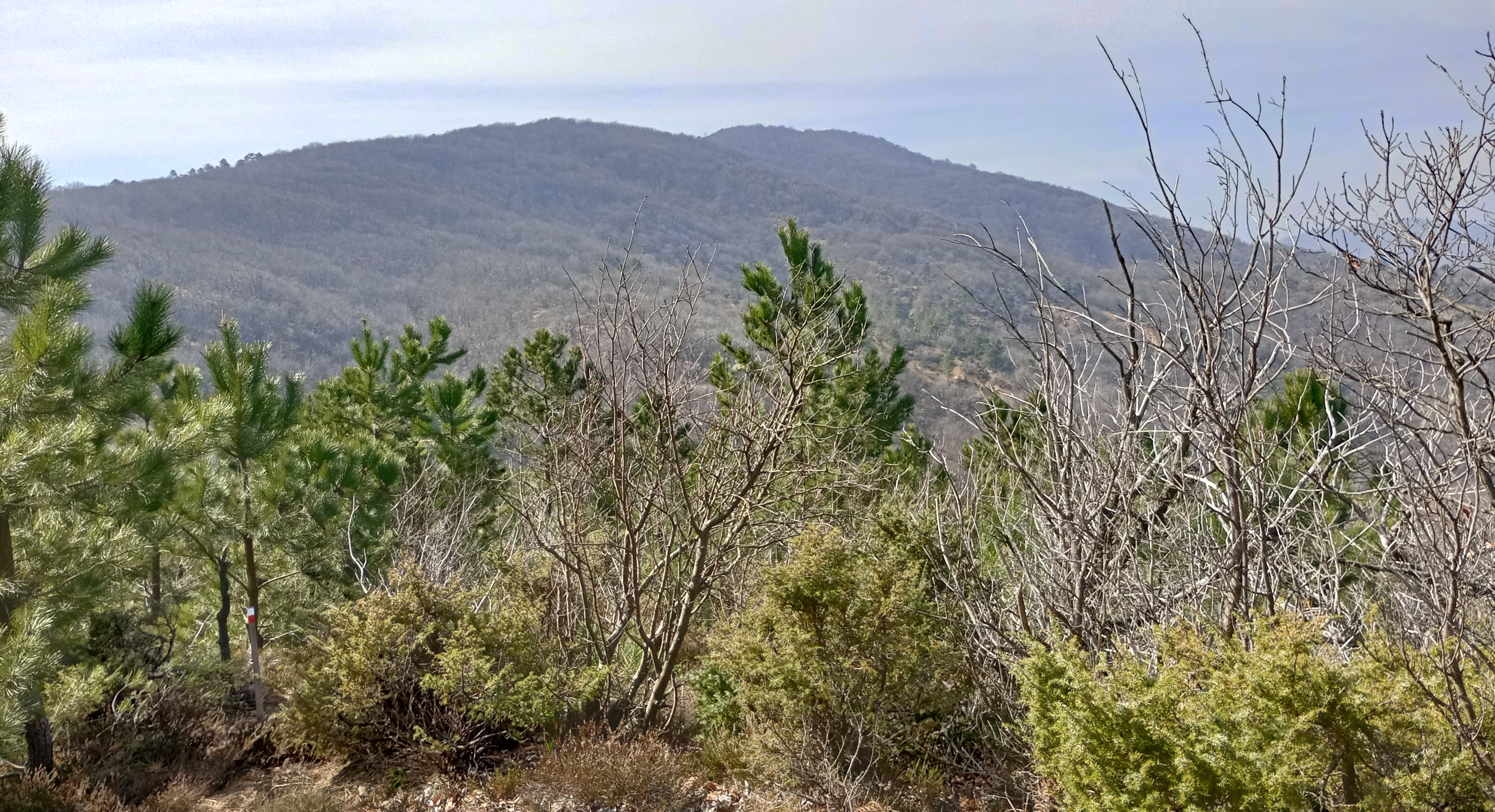

Highest point
- Elevation: 856 m (2,808 ft)
- Prominence: 131 m (430 ft)
- Coordinates: 44°34′47″N 08°41′52″E

Geography
- Location within Italy
- Location: Liguria / Piemonte, Italy
- Parent range: Ligurian Apennines

Monte Colma is a mountain in Liguria, northern Italy, part of the Ligurian Apennines. It is located in the provinces of Genoa and Alessandria. It lies at an altitude of 856 metres.

== Nature conservation ==
Part of the mountain is included in the Piedmontese natural park of the Capanne di Marcarolo.
