= Coleman Creek (Bear Creek tributary) =

Stream in Oregon, United States

- Location within Oregon Location within the United States

Physical characteristics
- Source
  - coordinates: 42.2054054°N 122.8950383°W
- Mouth
  - coordinates: 42.2859610°N 122.8233702°W

Coleman Creek is a stream in the U.S. state of Oregon. It is a tributary to Bear Creek.

Coleman Creek was named after Mathew H. Coleman, an early settler.
