= Kohlman =

Kohlman is a surname. Notable people with the surname include:

- Churchill Kohlman (1906–1983), American songwriter
- Freddie Kohlman (1918–1990), American musician
- Gary Kohlman, general counselor to the National Basketball Players Association
- Joe Kohlman (1913–1974), American baseball player
- Lynn Kohlman (1946–2008), American model, photographer and writer
- Richard E. Kohlman, Presiding Patriatch from May 2006 to March 2007

== See also ==
- Kohlmann
