= James W. Coleman House =

Historic house in Georgia, United States

- U.S. National Register of Historic Places
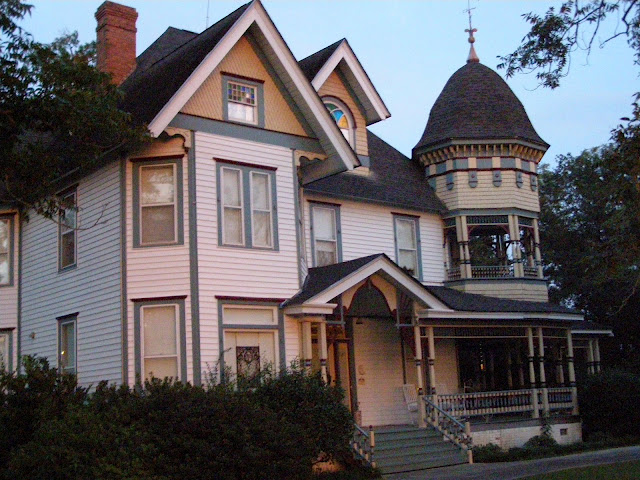

- Location within Georgia Location within the United States
- Nearest city: Moultrie, Georgia
- Coordinates: 31.224444°N 83.796944°W
- Area: 3 acres (1.2 ha)
- Built: 1903
- Architectural style: Late Victorian, Victorian Eclectic
- NRHP reference No.: 83003555
- Added to NRHP: December 22, 1983

The James W. Coleman House was built in Moultrie in Colquitt County, Georgia, in 1903 and listed on the National Register of Historic Places in 1983.

It is an imposing Late Victorian- and Victorian Eclectic-style house. Queen Anne elements are its massing, its gazebo-like porch tower, its irregular roof, and corbelled chimneys. Eastlake details include machine-turned columns of its porches and interior staircase.

The house is significant for its association with James W. Coleman (1871–1966), originally of Swainsboro, Georgia, who moved to Colquitt County in 1894 and who built this house. Coleman built and operated Colquit County's first cotton gin. The house and farm were viewed as a "model farm" and were used in marketing the county.

The property includes four contributing buildings.
