= Kolman =

Kolman is a name, used both as a surname and given name. Notable people with the name include:

== Kolman as surname ==
- Alojz Kolman (born 1967), Yugoslav-Slovenian artistic gymnast
- Ed Kolman (1915–1985), American football player
- Arnošt Kolman (1892–1979), Czech philosopher
- Nejc Kolman (born 1989), Slovenian football player

== Kolman as given name ==
- Kolman Helmschmied (1471–1532), German armourer
