= Priscilla Coleman (artist) =

American courtroom artist

Priscilla Coleman has worked as a court artist for ITN and newspapers in the UK for over 20 years, having originally started her career in America.

Coleman studied fine art and graphics at Sam Houston University in Texas. She worked for advertising agencies and a printing company laying out pages for publications before moving to the UK when her English husband wanted to return home.

She became a court artist when her art college teachers recommended her to cover a big case near where she went to university. With her background in graphics she was able to produce images for television news reports. In London, she was taken on by ITN.

When working, she prefers to sit in the court rather than in a media annexe, where the cameras tend to concentrate on who is speaking and the images are frequently too fuzzy. She does not actually draw in court - to do so would be illegal - but like other court artists takes notes in shorthand, for example about size of head, shape of nose, tie colour, haircut, without taking their eyes off the accused, as well as cryptic comments such as "gt bones... v. pretty silver hair... a v. glam older man... like an eagle" (Lord Hutton).

For her court sketches, she uses oil pastel and water-based sticks because "they look like chalks, but are durable and don’t smudge".

Among the high-profile cases Coleman has covered are the trials of Rosemary and Fred West, Ian Huntley and Maxine Carr, Barry George, Colin Ireland, and Raoul Moat's accomplices. She also covered Gillian Taylforth's unsuccessful libel case against The Sun, Harold Shipman, the Hutton inquiry and the inquests into the deaths of the 7 July bombings.

Apart from her work as a courtroom artist, Coleman produces silk screens and colour block graphics for interiors.
