= James Coleman House =

Historic house in Georgia, United States

- U.S. National Register of Historic Places
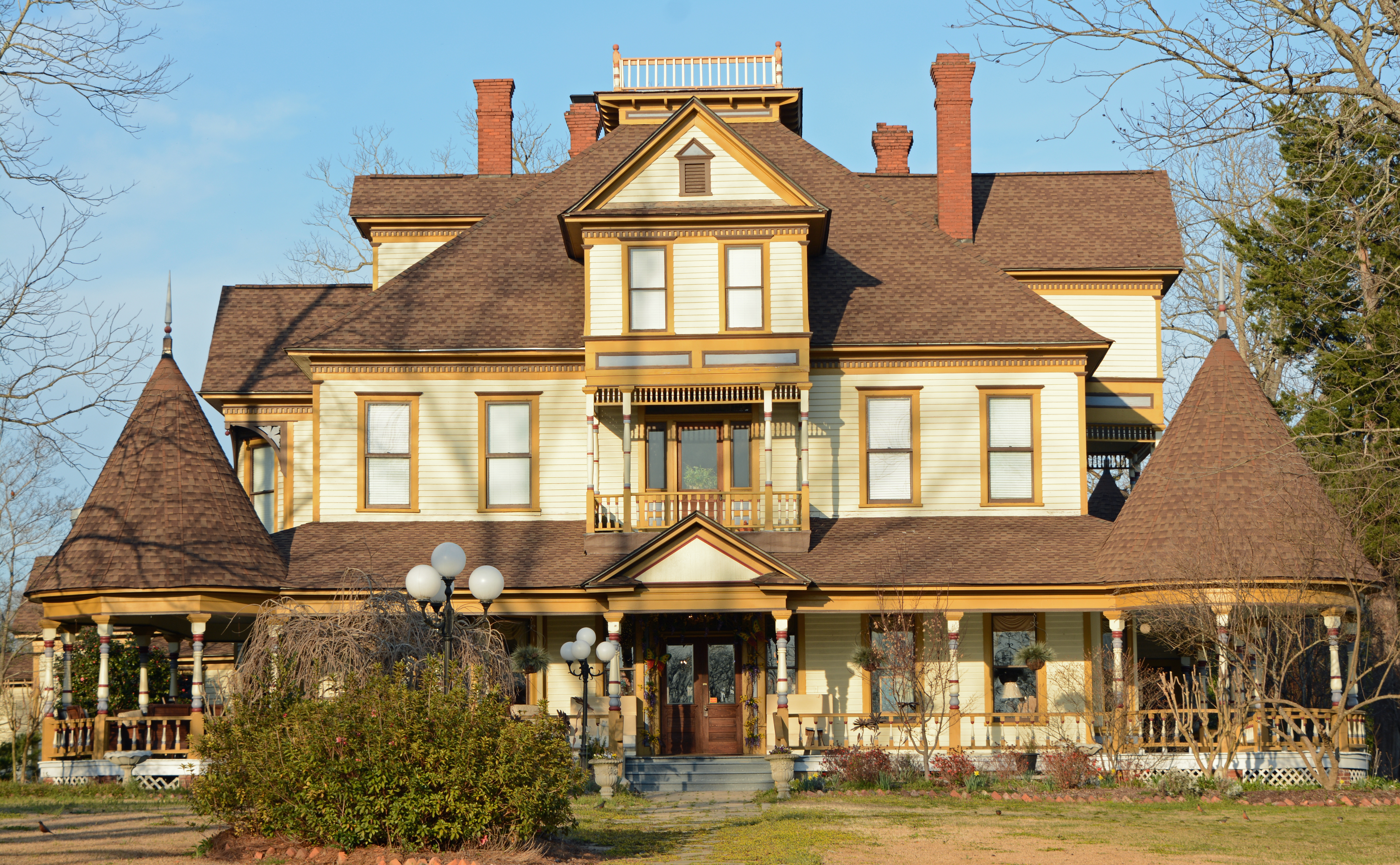

- Location within Georgia Location within the United States
- Location: 323 N. Main St., Swainsboro, Georgia
- Coordinates: 32.60186°N 82.33651°W
- Area: 2.8 acres (1.1 ha)
- Built: 1900-1904
- Architectural style: Queen Anne
- NRHP reference No.: 92000384
- Added to NRHP: April 28, 1992

The James Coleman House was built in Swainsboro, Georgia during 1900–1904. It was listed on the National Register of Historic Places in 1992. In 2017, it was a bed and breakfast inn, the Coleman House Inn.

It is a two-story wood-frame Queen Anne-style house with Classical Revival-style details.

It has 11 fireplaces.

On the south side of the property is a contributing one-story, brick hot house, used as a tool shed. There is also a non-contributing four-car garage.
