= Don Coleman (musician) =

- Born: Don Coleman
- Origin: Canada
- Genres: rock, light rock, AC
- Occupations: Singer-songwriter, composer
- Instruments: Vocals, keyboards, percussion
- Years active: 1983–present
- Website: Don Coleman Official Website

Don Coleman is a Canadian vocalist, songwriter, lyricist, performer and AC/DC tribute frontman.

In the autumn of 2021 Don Coleman released a song and video titled "Albert County Home Sweet Home" that celebrates Albert County, New Brunswick, Canada.
