= Richard Colman (MP) =

English Member of Parliament

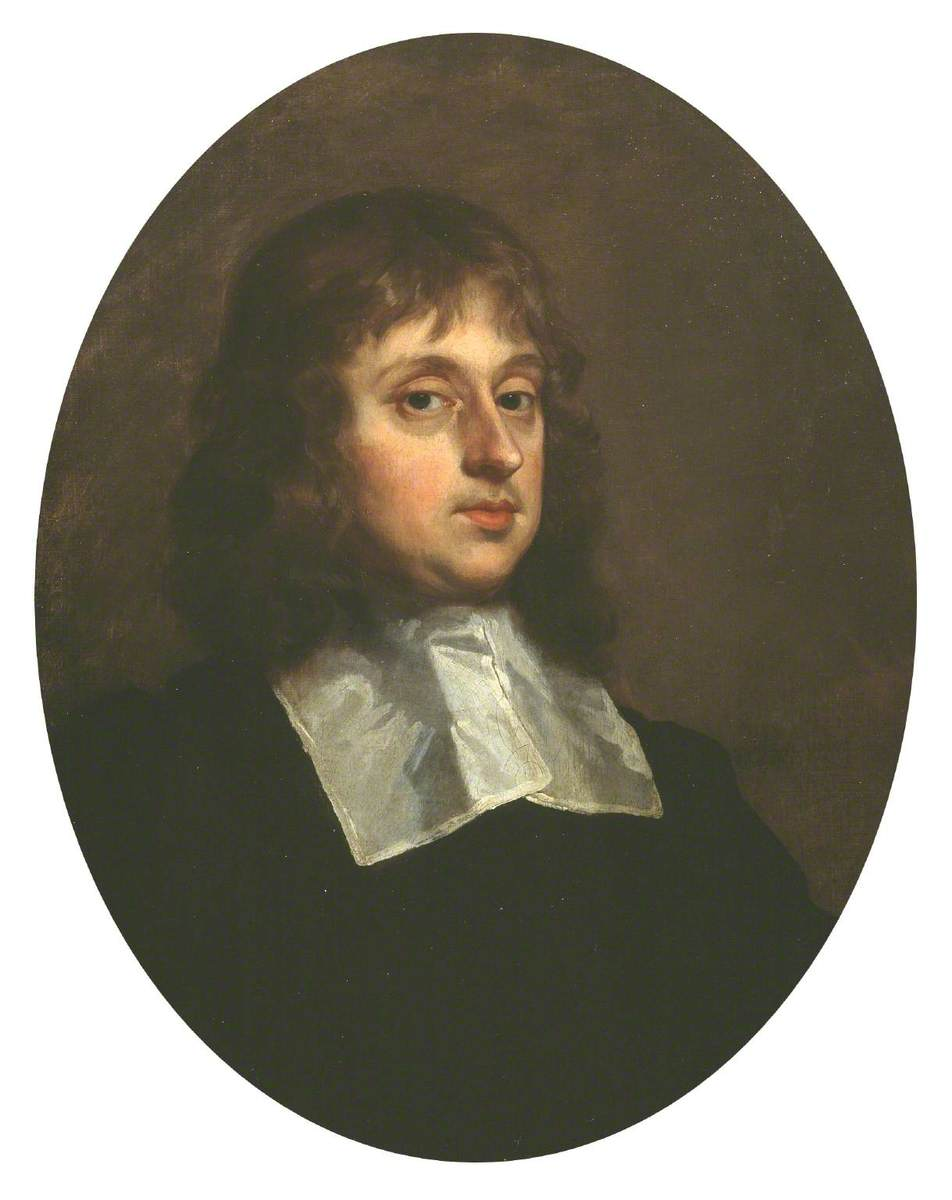
Portrait of Richard Colman - British School or John Greenhill (c.1649–1676) (attributed to); now in the Tate collection

Richard Colman (c. 1633–1672), of Lincoln's Inn and Melchet Park, Wiltshire, was an English Member of Parliament for Salisbury 8 February 1665 to 13 October 1672.
