= Colman baronets =

Set index for Colman baronets

There have been two baronetcies created for persons with the surname Colman, both in the Baronetage of the United Kingdom.

- Colman baronets of Gatton Park (1907)
- Colman baronets of Reigate (1952): see Sir Nigel Claudian Dalziel Colman, 1st Baronet (1886–1966)
