= Jack Colman =

New Zealand rugby union player

- Born: John Thomas Henry Colman; 14 January 1887 Hāwera, New Zealand
- Died: 28 September 1965 (aged 78) Hāwera, New Zealand
- Weight: 81 kg (179 lb)
- School: St Joseph's School
- Occupation: Blacksmith

Rugby union career
- Position(s): Utility back, wing-forward
Provincial / State sides
Years	Team	Apps	(Points)
1905–1922	Taranaki	49	
International career
Years	Team	Apps	(Points)
1907–1908	New Zealand	4	(2)

John Thomas Henry Colman (14 January 1887 – 28 September 1965) was a New Zealand rugby union player. A utility back and wing-forward, Colman represented Taranaki at a provincial level either side of World War I, and was a member of the New Zealand national side, the All Blacks, in 1907 and 1908. He played six matches for the All Blacks including four internationals.

Colman was a blacksmith. He died in Hāwera in 1965 and was buried in Hāwera Cemetery.
