= Colman's =

English condiment manufacturer

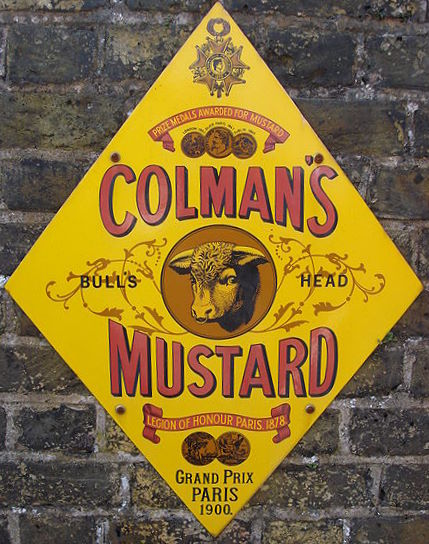
- An old Colman's advert at the Buckinghamshire Railway Centre
- Product type: Mustard
- Current owner: Unilever
- Country: Norfolk, East Anglia, England
- Introduced: 1814; 212 years ago
- Previous owners: Reckitt & Colman (now Reckitt Benckiser)

Colman's is an English manufacturer of mustard and other sauces, formerly based and produced for 160 years at Carrow, in Norwich, Norfolk. Owned by Unilever since 1995, Colman's is one of the oldest existing food brands, famous for a limited range of products, almost all being varieties of mustard, though now also producing a range of recipe and sauce mixes, as well as other condiments. In August 2026 Colman's was put up for sale.

== History ==
In the early 1800s, Jeremiah Colman began making mustard at a water mill near Norwich in the village of Bawburgh. To create a tangy flavour, he blended brown mustard (Brassica juncea) with white mustard (Sinapis alba).

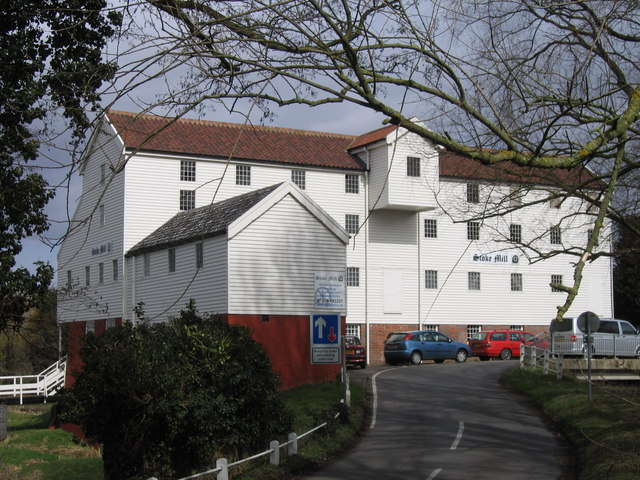
Stoke Holy Cross Mill was the home of Colman's Mustard from 1814 to 1862.

Colman founded Colman's of Norwich in 1814, at the Stoke Holy Cross mill on the River Tas, four miles (6.4 km) south of Norwich. In 1823 he took his adopted nephew, James, into the business, which became J. & J. Colman.

In 1851, J. J. Colman took over the business. By 1865, production had transferred to a large factory at Carrow Road on land at Thorpe Hamlet, bought from the Norfolk Railway to the south of Norwich, where the firm operated until the Norwich closure.

From 1855, the firm introduced its distinctive yellow packaging and bull's-head logo. In 1866, it was granted the Royal Warrant as manufacturers of mustard to Queen Victoria.

The Colman family's pioneering achievements in social welfare are part of Norwich's history. In 1857 a school was opened for the employees' children, while in 1864, the firm employed a nurse to help sick members of staff, a social revolution at the time. By 1893, Colman's had employed chemists to check the quality of seed in its mustard mill; this made Colman's one of the first food manufacturers to employ their own scientists.

From 1896, Jeremiah Colman became chairman. In 1903, the firm took over rival mustard maker Keen Robinson & Company, through which it also acquired the Robinsons barley water and baby food business. The purpose of the acquisition was to reduce competition within the mustard business. Under this subsidiary, experiments were done on rats and guinea pigs to test the growth-promoting effects of Almata, a product intended to emulate breast milk. Chemists were employed to promote Almata by providing what they referred to at the time as "medical propaganda".

In the 19th and early 20th centuries Wisbech uniquely held annual mustard markets where the sale of the harvest of 'brown' and 'white' seed took place. Regular annual Buyers included Messrs Colman's. By 1909, the company employed 2,300 people.

Keen's production was moved from London to Norwich in 1925. Together with Reckitt, the company acquired French's, the American mustard manufacturer, in 1926 for £750,000. At one point, as part of the company's Research Department, Britain's first industrial research aviary was established. This held a canary colony to research the effects of irradiated ergosterol, a source of Vitamin D, on their growth. This was on behalf of their pet food subsidiary R. T. French as they looked to purchase patents. Their research indicated that the vitamin had little or no positive effect. However, the colony remained a feature of the Department for product development and testing.

The Colman's part of the business was demerged in 1995 and Colman's became part of Unilever UK Ltd. In addition to mustard, it applies its name to condiments, sauces and other foodstuffs. Reckitt and Colman engaged in cost-cutting as it prepared to sell the brand, getting rid of the agronomy department, which had looked after plant breeding and seed development.

Colman's maintains links with Norwich. The founding family are commemorated in street names such as Colman Road (part of the A140 inner ring road), on which is situated Colman First and Middle Schools. In addition, the Colman House residence at the University of East Anglia is named after the company and Jeremiah Colman.

== Relocation ==
In January 2018, it was announced that Colman's was to leave its base in Norwich where the condiment had been produced for 160 years and would move its production to Burton upon Trent in Staffordshire and Germany.

In 2019, the Colman's factory in Norwich rolled its last jar of mustard off the production line and its "best before" date was changed for the occasion to: "Norwich's Last. By Its Finest. July 24th 2019". Colman's continued making other condiments at the Carrow site until closing in early 2020.

== Colman's Mustard Shop and Museum ==
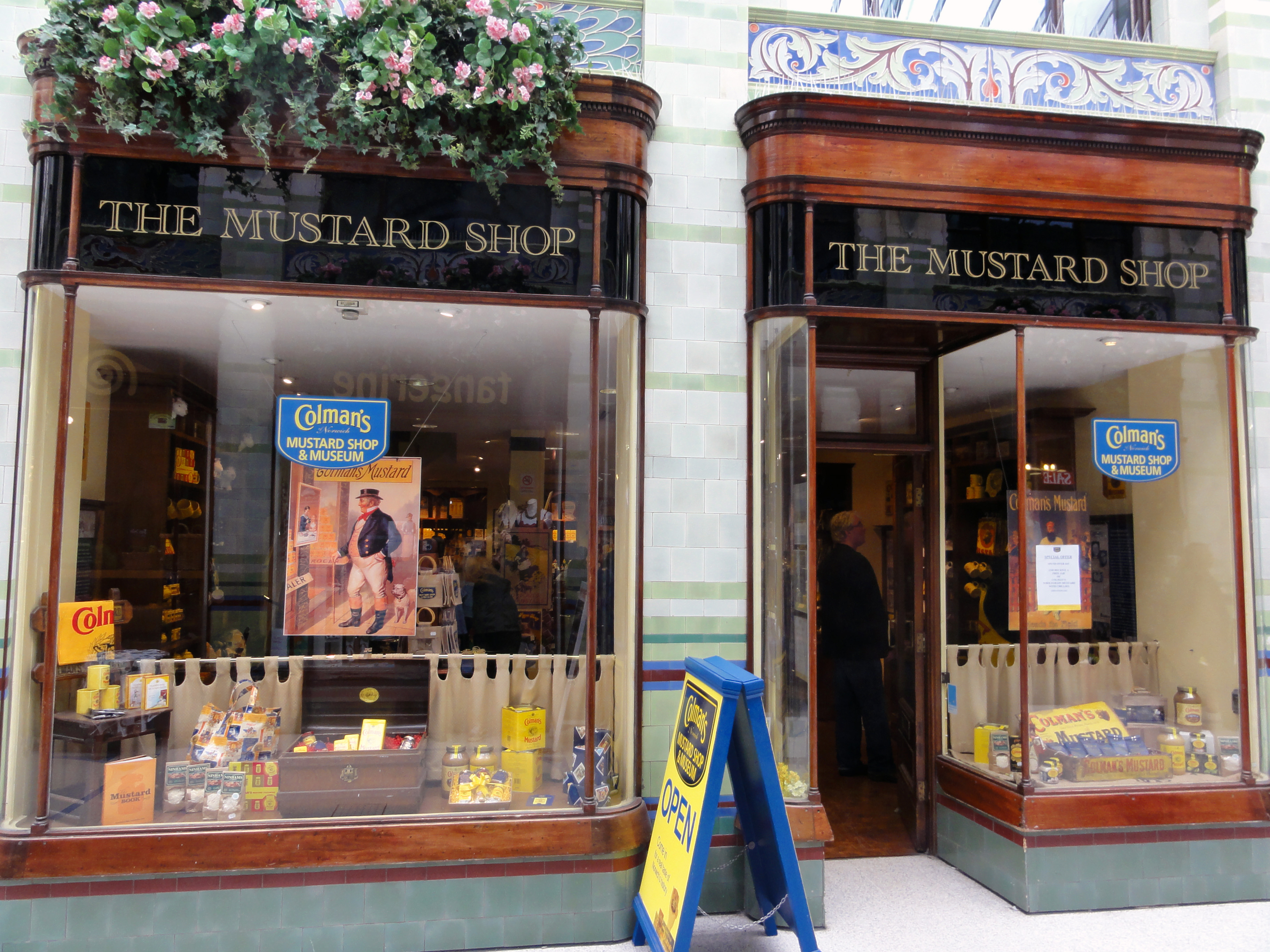
Colman's Mustard Shop and Museum in The Royal Arcade, Norwich, 2011

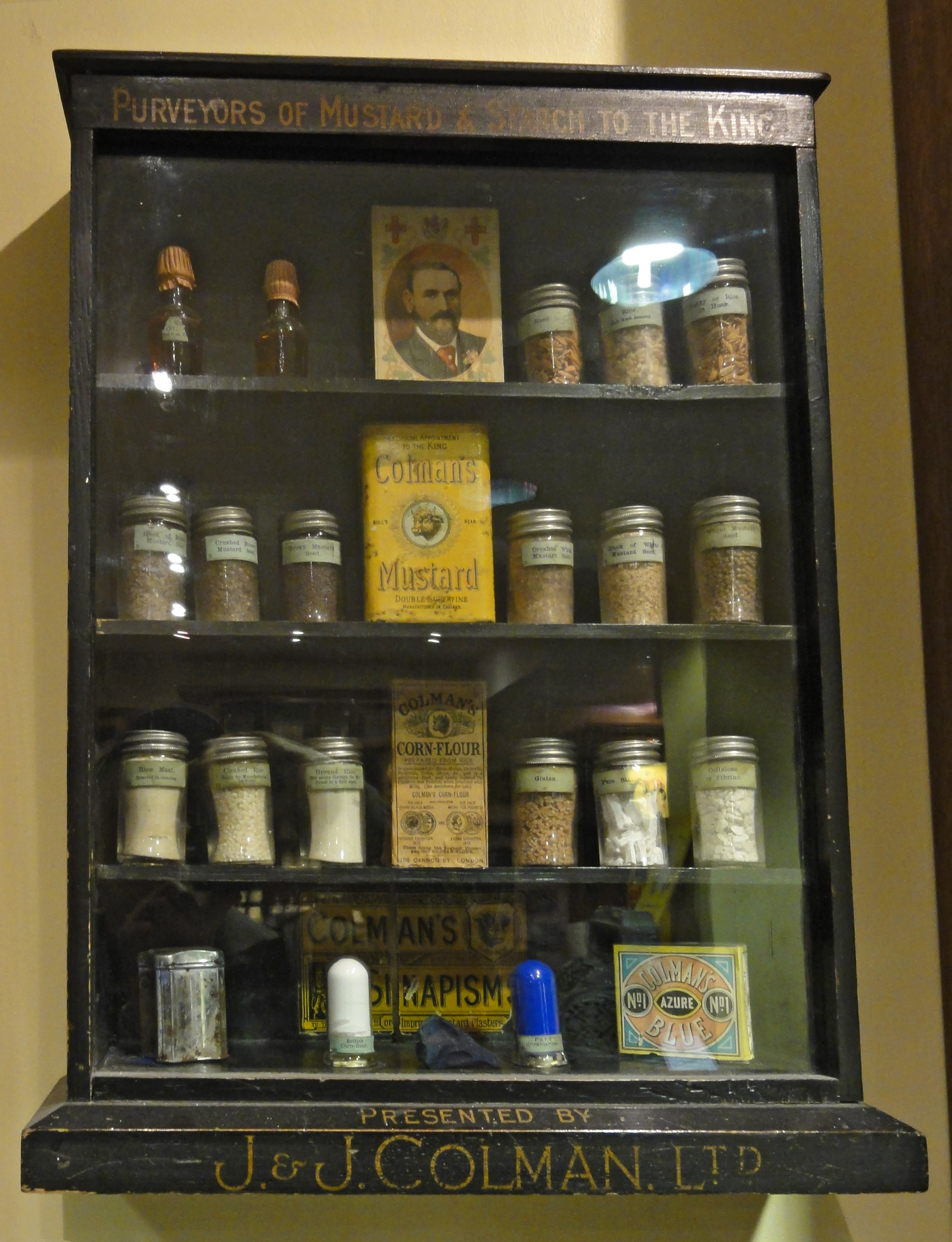
Schools' display cabinet showing ingredients for Colman's manufacture which was produced between 1900 and 1939, on display in Colman's Mustard Shop and Museum

The Mustard Shop traded in Norwich from 1973 to April 2017. The shop was originally opened in Bridewell Alley. In 1999, the shop was relocated to Norwich's Royal Arcade. Norwich Heritage Economic and Regeneration Trust took over the shop in 2009, making it both a retail operation and tourism attraction. In 2015, Guildhall Enterprises took the premises from HEART. The shop was closed in April 2017.

== Publicity ==
In the 1920s, Dorothy L. Sayers worked on their account. Sayers was employed by S. H. Benson; her collaboration with artist John Gilroy resulted in "The Mustard Club" for Colman's Mustard. Media slogans such as "Come on Colman's, light my fire" appeared in the late 20th century.

In 1975, British musician Roy Wood—best known as a member of The Move and Wizzard—collaborated with Colman's extensively in the promotional cycle for his second solo album entitled Mustard. This included a competition in Record Mirror & Disc in which readers could win, amongst other prizes, a one-gallon jar of Colman's mustard with Wood's autograph. The Colman's mustard giveaway was arranged by Wood’s label Jet Records in co-operation with the brand.

While the product was still manufactured in Norfolk, Colman's was the main shirt sponsor of Norwich City Football Club.

In the 1942 film Yankee Doodle Dandy, a part of the song "Off the Record" says "We entertained the Royalty / But we were never flustered / We served them Yankee hot dogs / With Colman's English mustard."

== Product range ==
- Colman's Mustard
  - English Mustard
  - Dijon Mustard
  - Whole-grain mustard
  - Apple Cider Mustard which is discontinued
  - American mustard which is discontinued
  - French mustard which is discontinued
  - Garlic Mustard which is discontinued
  - German Mustard which is discontinued
- Colman's Condiments
  - Bramley Apple Sauce
  - Mint Sauce: A product that had 2 names until late 2010's of Classic Mint Sauce and Fresh Garden Mint.
  - Cranberry Sauce a Christmas edition there was Cherry Cranberry Sauce in the mid 1990s.
  - Horseradish Sauce
  - Seafood Sauce
  - Tartare Sauce
  - Sweet Mint Jelly which is discontinued
- Colman's recipe mixes
  - Beef bourguignon
  - Sausage and onion casserole
  - Coq au vin
  - Chicken pie
  - Fish pie
  - Beef casserole
  - Chilli con carne
  - Sausage casserole
  - Chicken casserole
  - Cottage pie
  - Spaghetti bolognese
  - Tuna pasta bake
  - Chicken chasseur
  - Shepherd's pie
  - Hot chilli con carne
  - Chicken supreme
  - Beef stroganoff
  - Lamb hotpot
- Colman's sauce mixes
  - Pepper sauce
  - Onion sauce
  - Parsley sauce
  - Cheddar cheese sauce
  - White sauce
  - Bread sauce
- Colman's Big Night In
  - Salt and pepper chicken
  - Mexican burritos
  - Korean barbecue
  - Argentinian steak
  - Chicken kebab
  - Ultimate burger
  - Doner kebab
- Colman's Season and Shake
  - Mediterranean chicken
  - Garlic and herb roast chicken
  - Piri piri chicken
  - Sweet chilli chicken
  - Cajun chicken

== See also ==
- List of mustard brands
