= Jeremiah Colman =

English miller (1777–1851)

Jeremiah Colman (1777–1851) was an English miller who founded Colman's Mustard, a business which merged into the conglomerate Reckitt & Colman, and is now owned by Unilever.

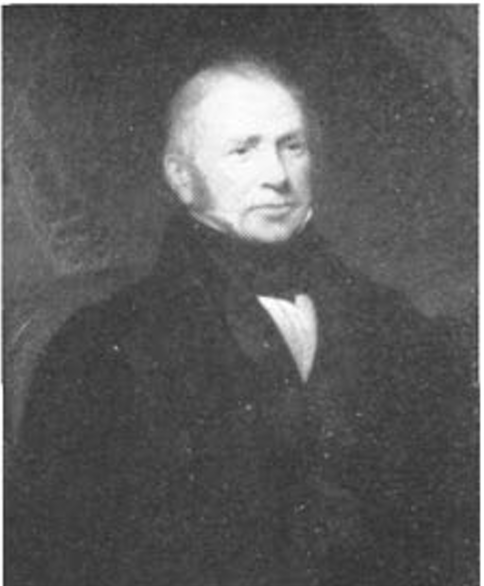
Jeremiah Colman (1771-1851) who began the milling of mustard at Magdalen Gate, Norwich, in 1804. J. &J. Colman is named after Jeremiah and his nephew James.

== Life ==
He was born in Norfolk in 1777 to Robert Colman (1749-1807) and Mary (née Harmer). Trained as a miller, Jeremiah Colman managed a mill at Bawburgh before buying his own mill at Pockthorpe in 1803.

In 1814 he bought the mustard business of Edward Ames and moved it to a mill at Stoke Holy Cross where he started crushing mustard seed. In 1823, having no children of his own, he went into partnership with his nephew James. By 1829 J & J Colman was selling mustard in London.

He was elected Sheriff of Norwich in 1845 and Mayor of Norwich in 1846.

Colman died aged 74 in 1851. He had married Anne but had no children. Within 20 years of his death his mustard business had become a Victorian household name.
