= Sir Jeremiah Colman, 1st Baronet =

British industrialist (1859–1942)

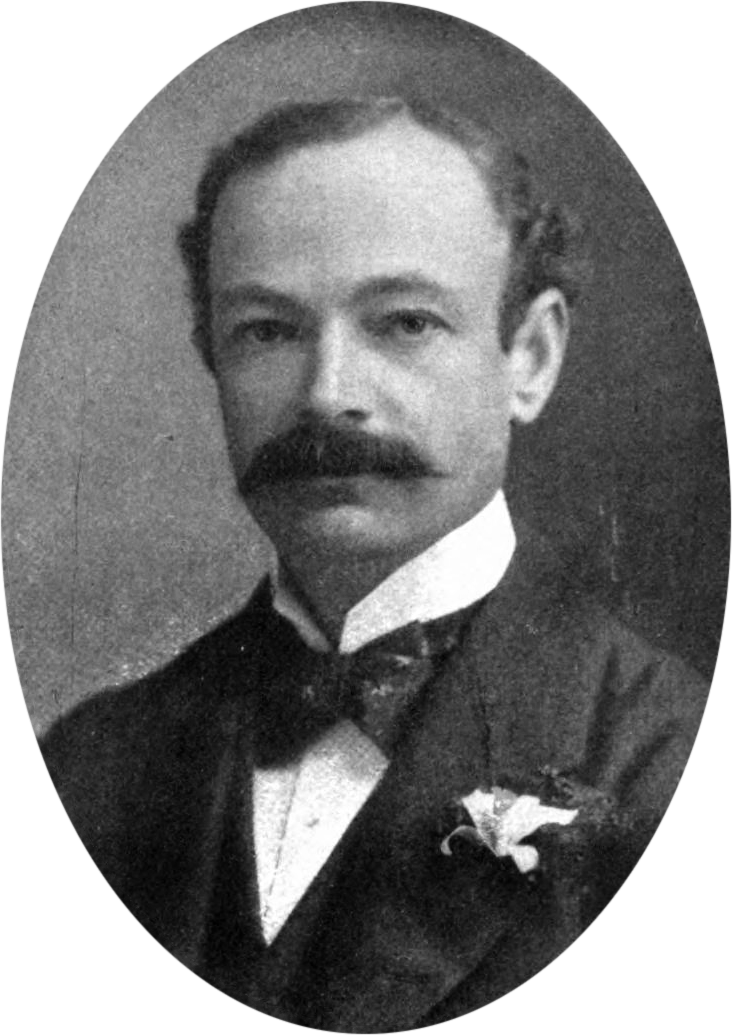
Coleman c.1914

Sir Jeremiah Colman, 1st Baronet, DL (24 April 1859 – 16 January 1942) was a British industrialist who developed Colman's Mustard into an international concern.

== Career ==
Colman was the son of Jeremiah Colman (1807–1885) and Isabella Button. Educated at King's College School and St. John's College, Cambridge, Colman joined the J & J Colman mustard business and then served as its Chairman from 1896. He was also Chairman of Commercial Union.

He served as High Sheriff of Surrey from 1893 to 1894 and also became Lieutenant of the City of London. He was created a baronet in 1907.

== Personal life ==
In 1885, he married Mary McMaster of Mitcham, Surrey. They had one son, also Jeremiah, who succeeded his father in 1942.

In 1888 he purchased Gatton Park, a country estate in Surrey. At Gatton Park he amassed one of the largest collections of orchids in the country. He commissioned Henry Ernest Milner to design the parterre.

He was also keen on cricket and from 1916 to 1923 he was President of Surrey County Cricket Club.

He also funded the Colman Library at the Department of Biochemistry at Cambridge University.

In 1936 he was the recipient of the Silver Fish Award, presented by the founder of Scouting, Lord Baden-Powell, for "making possible" the extension to London's East End Scouting home, Roland House.

Colman's brother in law was the lawyer Charles Tyrrell Giles.

Baronetage of the United Kingdom
New creation	Baronet (of Gatton Park); 1907–1942	Succeeded by Jeremiah Colman
