= Oakzanita Peak =

Mountain in California, United States

Highest point
- Elevation: 5,056 ft (1,541 m) NAVD 88
- Prominence: 214 ft (65 m)
- Listing: Hundred Peaks Section; San Diego Peak list
- Coordinates: 32°53′27″N 116°33′42″W

Geography
- Location: San Diego County, California, U.S.
- Topo map: USGS Cuyamaca Peak

Climbing
- Easiest route: Hike, class 1

Oakzanita Peak is a mountain in the Cuyamaca Mountains of San Diego County roughly 40 miles (64 km) from the Pacific Ocean, in Cuyamaca Rancho State Park east of San Diego and south-southwest of the town of Julian.
