= Stonewall Peak =

Mountain in southern California, United States

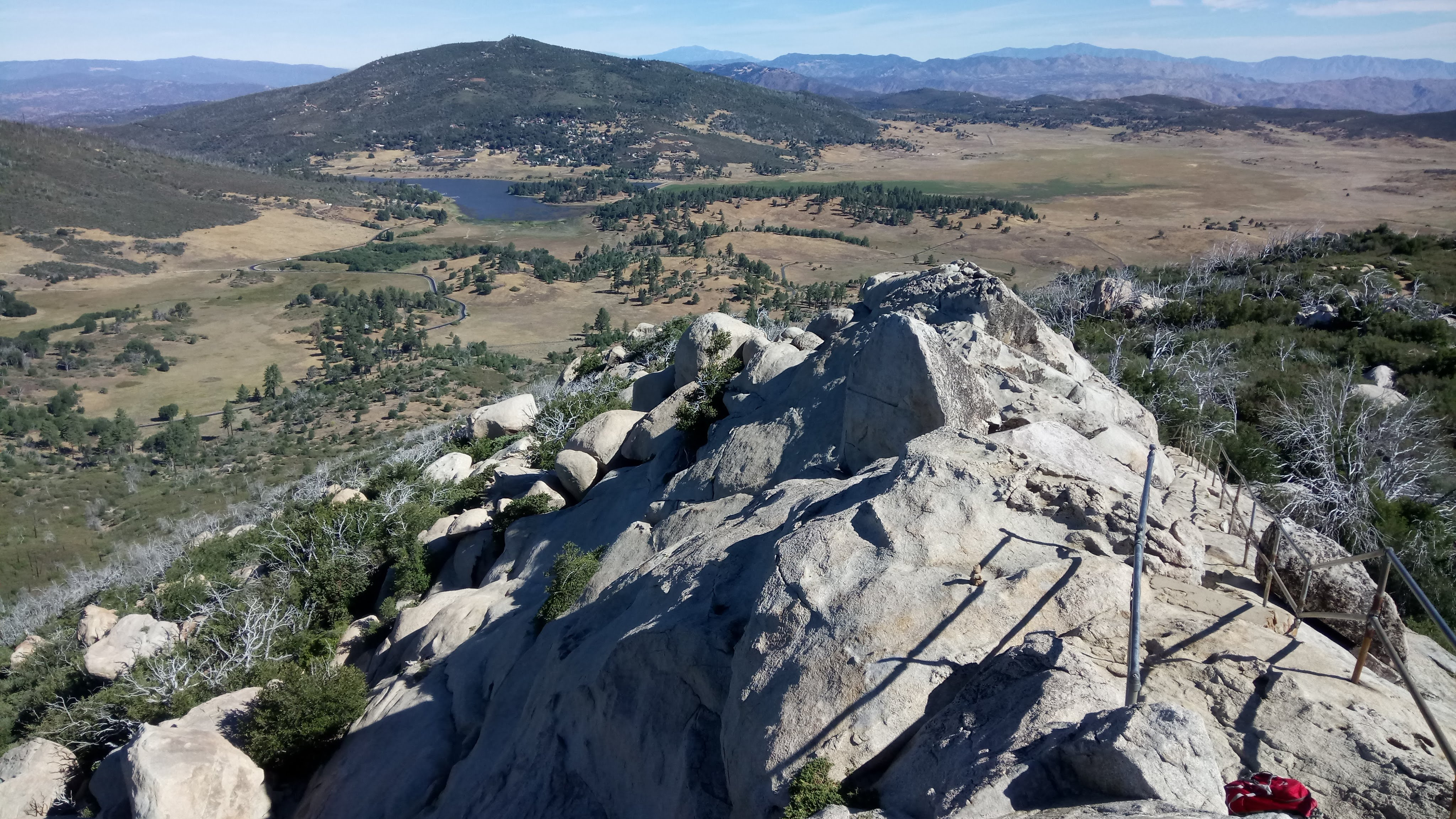
- Top of Stonewall Peak looking north

Highest point
- Elevation: 5730 ft (1747 m)
- Prominence: 860 ft (263 m)
- Isolation: 1.77 mi (2.85 km)
- Listing: San Diego peaks list #55
- Coordinates: 32°57′39″N 116°34′19″W

Geography
- Location: San Diego County, California, United States
- Topo map: USGS Cuyamaca Peak

Stonewall Peak is a prominent mountain in San Diego County, California, located in Cuyamaca Rancho State Park. It is east of San Diego and south of Julian.

The summit is accessible from Paso Picacho Campground, which is accessed by California State Route 79. Hikes can be done as an out and back going up the west side of the mountain, which is about four miles round trip, or it can be a loop, going up the west side and down the north, for a total of just over five miles. The hike to the peak from Paso Picacho is a series of gentle switchbacks with a staircase leading to the stone peak.

== History ==
Stonewall Peak was named after Stonewall Mine which was between Stonewall Peak and Lake Cuyamaca. The mine was originally named Stonewall Jackson Mine, after Confederate general Stonewall Jackson, and was founded in 1870. The mine was one of the richest in all of San Diego. Anti-Southern sentiments eventually led to the name being shortened to Stonewall Mine.

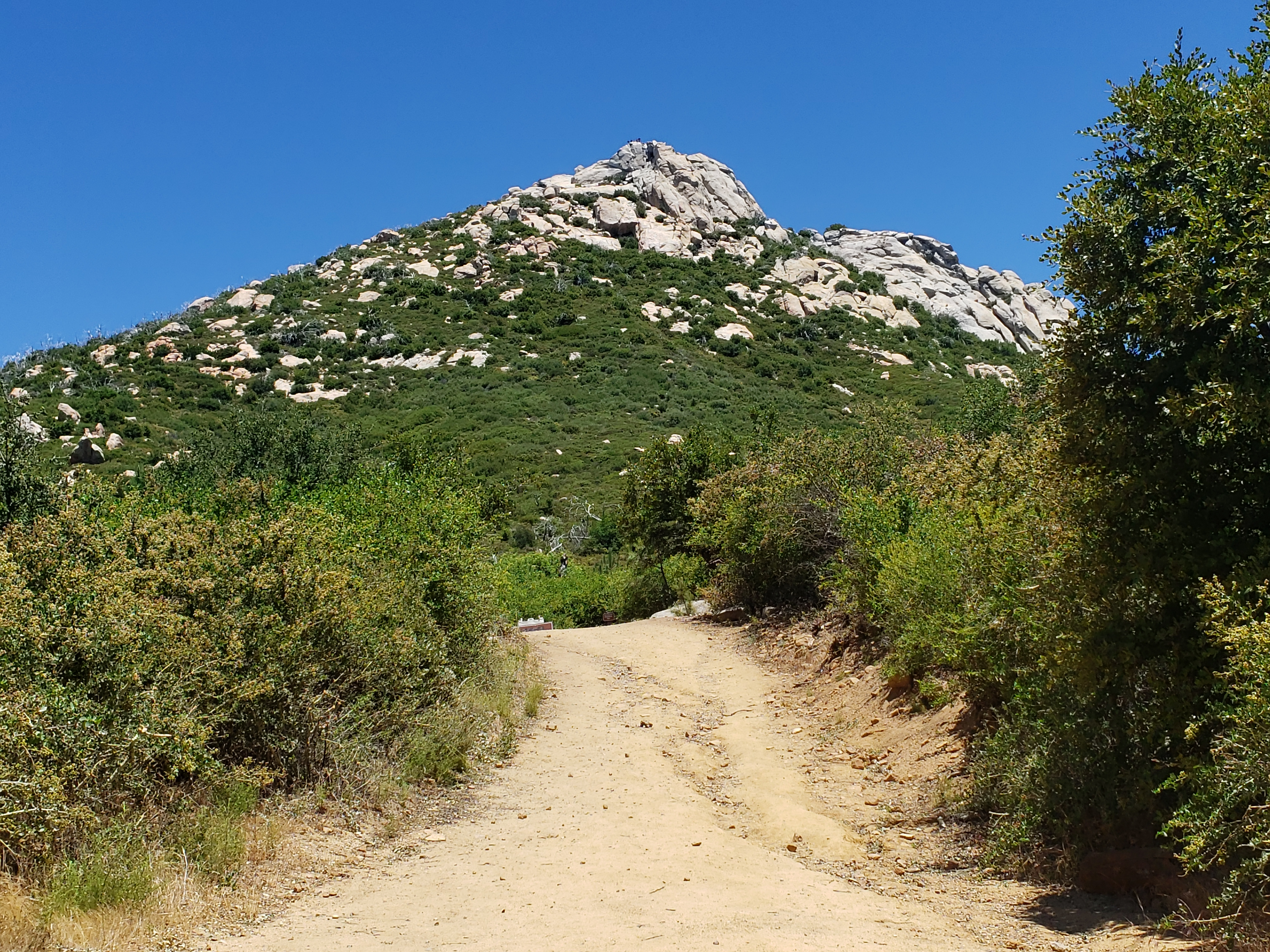
Stonewall Peak in Cuyamaca Rancho State Park

The peak's original Kumeyaay name was Cushi-Pi, meaning "Sharp Peak". Kumeyaay efforts lead to the change of the peak's official name to Cush-pii by the California Advisory Committee on Geographic Names in 2026.
