= Cuyamaca, California =

American region of eastern San Diego County

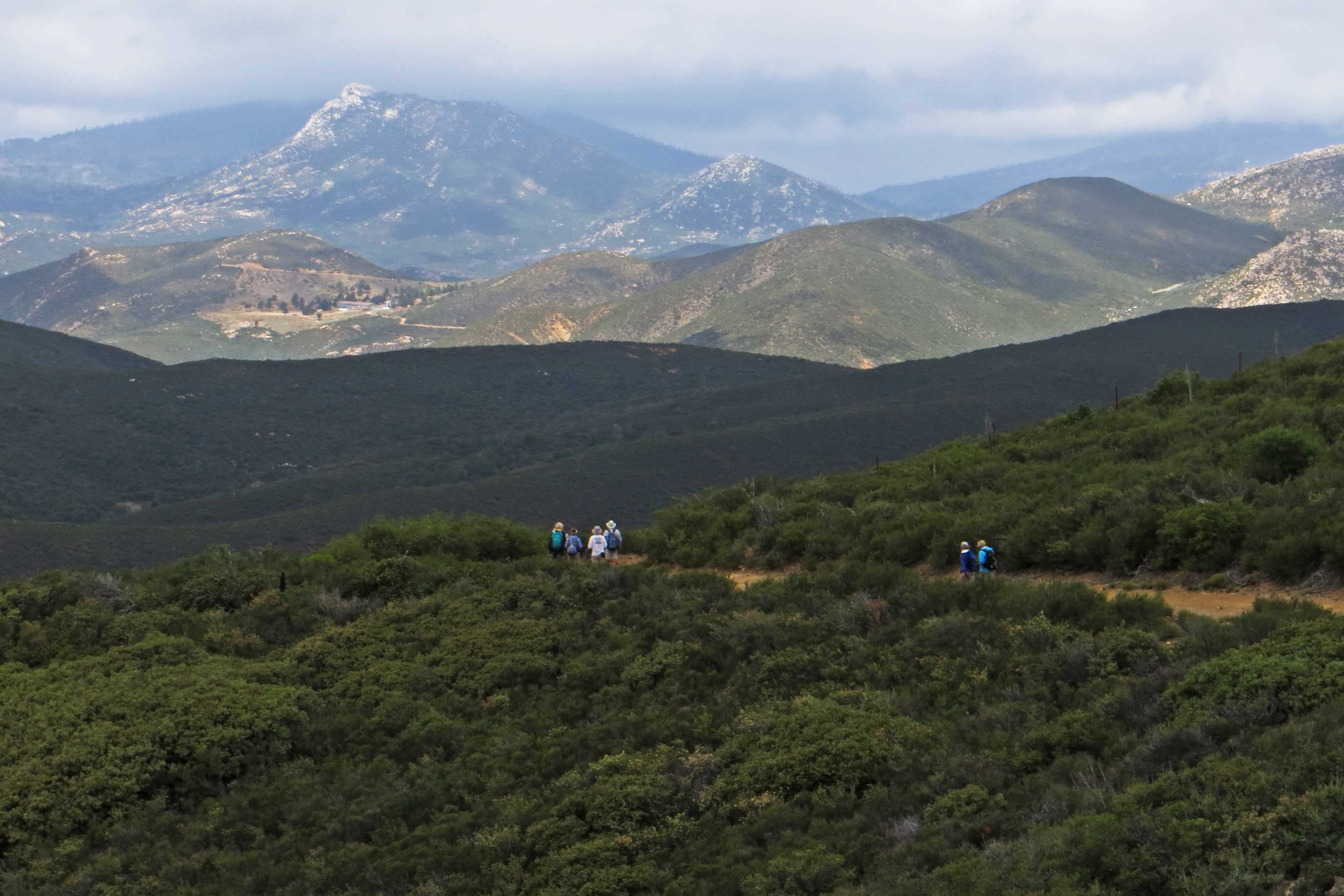
Cuyamaca Mountains "behind the clouds" and Stonewall Peak, seen from the Lagunas

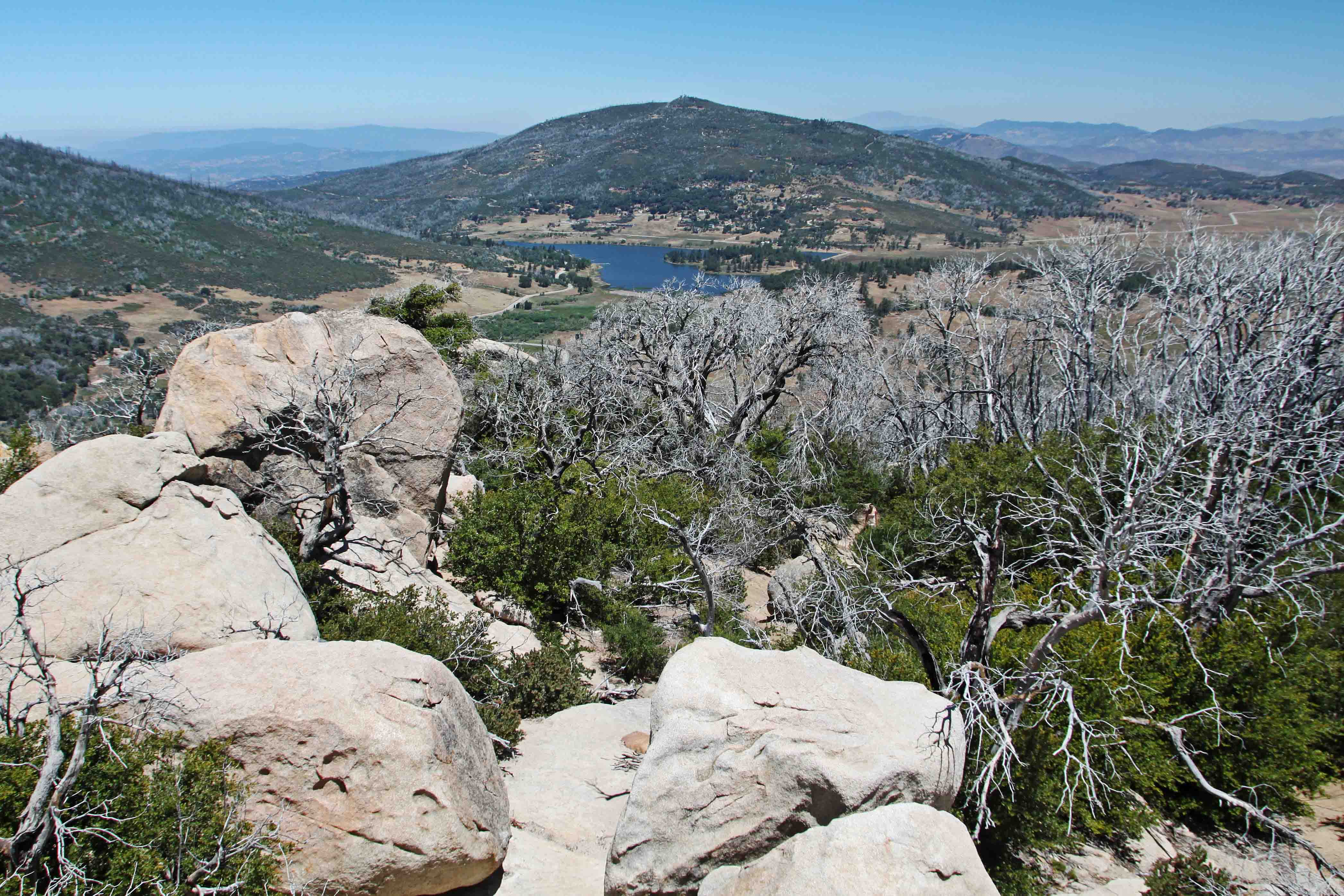
Lake Cuyamaca seen from Stonewall Peak

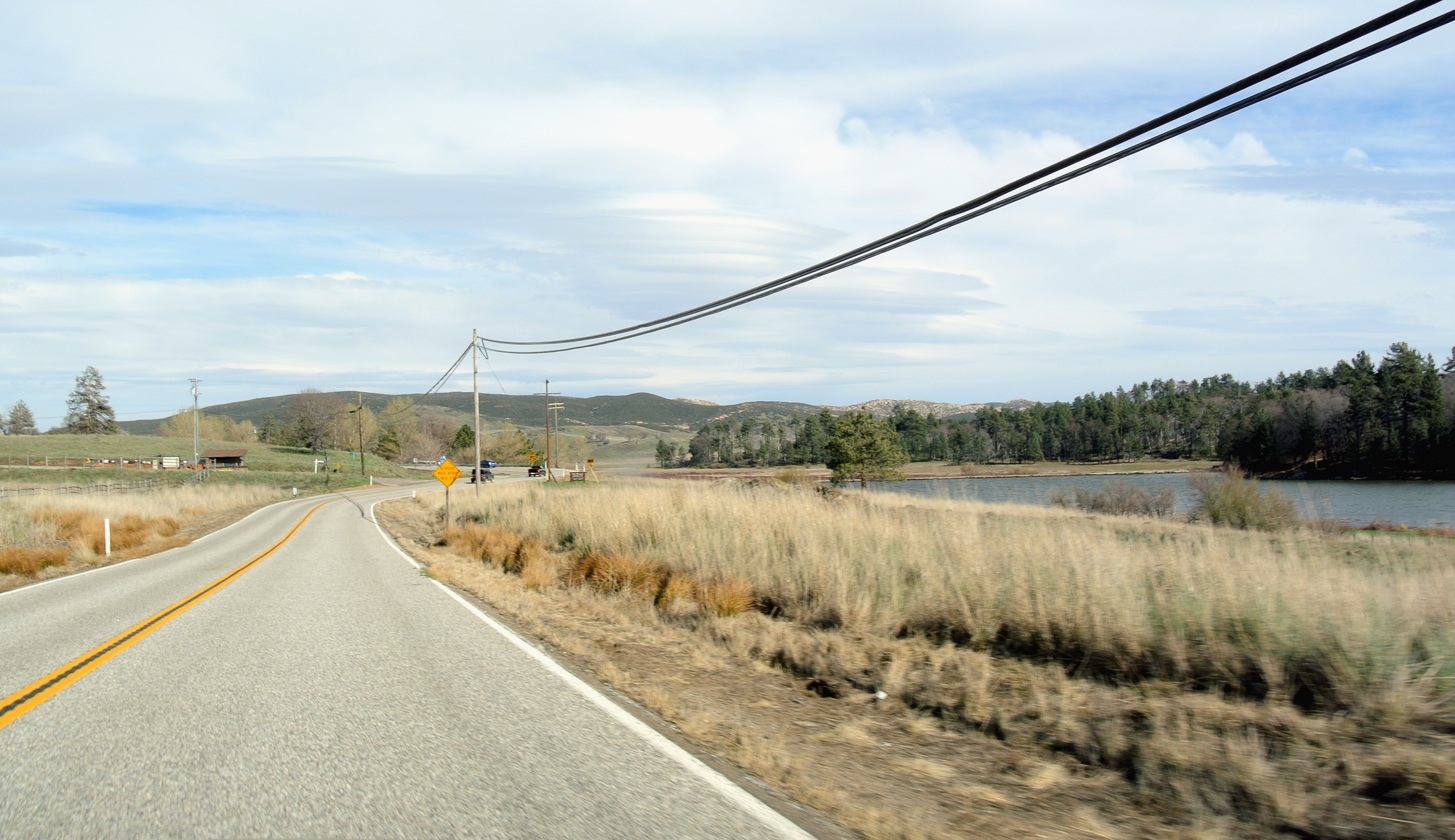
CA 79 looking north with Lake Cuyamaca on the right

Cuyamaca (Kumeyaay: ‘Ekwiiyemak) is a region of eastern San Diego County, California. It lies east of the Capitan Grande Reservation in the western Laguna Mountains, north of Descanso and south of Julian. Named for the 1845 Rancho Cuyamaca Mexican land grant, the region is now dominated by the 26,000-acre (110 km^{2}) Cuyamaca Rancho State Park. Within the park is the prominent Cuyamaca Peak, the second-highest mountain in San Diego County at 6,512 feet (1,984.9 m). The modern community of Cuyamaca is on the north side of the lake. It consists of the Cuyamaca Woods, Cuyamaca Resort, and North Peak areas.

The name is a Spanish corruption of the Kumeyaay phrase "'Ekwiiyemak", which means, according to Margaret Langdon's translation, "Behind the clouds". It has also been translated as "the place where it rains", a reference to the region's higher average precipitation than San Diego County's low coastal areas. Cuyamaca is a popular toponym lending its name to streets, businesses and a community college in the San Diego area.

== History ==
During the Julian Gold Rush, a quartz gold mine; the Stonewall Mine, was found on the south side of what is now Lake Cuyamaca. First a mining camp called Stonewall (1873–1876), then the mining company town of Stratton (1887–1888), renamed Cuyamaca City (1888–1906), at its peak had a population of 500 and served the Stonewall Mine.

In 1906, the post office was closed and service moved to Descanso. The town was abandoned after mining operations ceased, and few traces of it exist. The site of the town now lies within Cuyamaca Rancho State Park at 32°59′05″N 116°34′15″W.

The modern community of Cuyamaca later developed on the north side of the lake. Before the Cedar Fire of 2003, the community of Cuyamaca consisted of approximately 145 homes on a mountain (North Peak) north of the reservoir.

=== Cedar Fire ===
In October 2003, most of the Cuyamaca region was consumed by the Cedar Fire. Nearly 25,000 acres (100 km^{2}) in the state park and 120 homes in the community of Cuyamaca were incinerated. The fire also destroyed the Lakeland Resort, Camp Fire's Camp Wolahi and the former San Diego-Imperial Council, BSA's Camp Hual-Cu-Cuish . The historic Dyer Ranch house in the center of the state park, which functioned as a museum and the park headquarters, was also destroyed.

=== Climate ===
Climate data for Cuyamaca, CA (1991-2020 normals, extremes 1899–present)
Month	Jan	Feb	Mar	Apr	May	Jun	Jul	Aug	Sep	Oct	Nov	Dec	Year
Record high °F (°C)	76 (24)	75 (24)	82 (28)	86 (30)	92 (33)	101 (38)	104 (40)	110 (43)	101 (38)	94 (34)	85 (29)	78 (26)	110 (43)
Mean daily maximum °F (°C)	51.1 (10.6)	51.2 (10.7)	55.2 (12.9)	59.5 (15.3)	66.6 (19.2)	76.0 (24.4)	83.2 (28.4)	84.1 (28.9)	79.1 (26.2)	68.6 (20.3)	58.7 (14.8)	50.8 (10.4)	65.4 (18.6)
Daily mean °F (°C)	42.0 (5.6)	42.4 (5.8)	45.7 (7.6)	49.1 (9.5)	55.3 (12.9)	63.6 (17.6)	70.7 (21.5)	70.8 (21.6)	65.1 (18.4)	55.2 (12.9)	47.0 (8.3)	41.3 (5.2)	54.0 (12.2)
Mean daily minimum °F (°C)	33.0 (0.6)	33.5 (0.8)	36.2 (2.3)	38.7 (3.7)	43.9 (6.6)	51.2 (10.7)	58.1 (14.5)	57.6 (14.2)	51.2 (10.7)	41.8 (5.4)	35.3 (1.8)	31.8 (−0.1)	42.7 (5.9)
Record low °F (°C)	−1 (−18)	−1 (−18)	10 (−12)	20 (−7)	20 (−7)	27 (−3)	34 (1)	29 (−2)	23 (−5)	15 (−9)	10 (−12)	2 (−17)	−1 (−18)
Average precipitation inches (mm)	5.51 (140)	6.43 (163)	4.87 (124)	2.34 (59)	1.06 (27)	0.17 (4.3)	0.35 (8.9)	0.50 (13)	0.57 (14)	1.46 (37)	2.65 (67)	4.34 (110)	30.25 (768)
Average snowfall inches (cm)	3.8 (9.7)	5.4 (14)	5.5 (14)	3.1 (7.9)	0.1 (0.25)	0.0 (0.0)	0.0 (0.0)	0.0 (0.0)	0.0 (0.0)	0.0 (0.0)	0.7 (1.8)	1.3 (3.3)	19.9 (51)
Average precipitation days (≥ 0.01 in)	7.2	7.9	7.2	5.3	3.2	0.9	1.7	1.9	1.7	3.5	4.4	7.3	52.2
Average snowy days (≥ 0.1 in)	1.4	2.4	1.6	1.0	0.1	0.0	0.0	0.0	0.0	0.0	0.4	1.1	8.0
Source: NOAA
