= Cuyamaca Outdoor School =

Outdoor school in San Diego, California, United States

Coordinates: 32°55′38″N 116°33′32″W

Camp Cuyamaca Outdoor School
- 12561 Highway 79; Descanso, California 91916

Information
- Established: 1946
- Principal: 1
- Faculty: 2 Credentialed Teachers, 24 Outdoor Education Program Specialists, 6 Cabin Assistants, 1 Registered Nurse, 2 Health Services Technicians, 1 Child Nutrition Supervisor, 1 Chef, 2 Cooks, 4 Food Service Workers, 1 Maintenance & Operations Supervisor, 1 Maintenance Worker II, 2 Custodians, 1 Outdoor Education Program Assistant, 1 Site Administrator, 1 Principal
- Enrollment: 13,500 per year
- Website: Official website

Opened in 1946, Cuyamaca Outdoor School, the first Outdoor School in California and the only Outdoor School in San Diego County that is certified by ROSS (Residential Outdoor Science Schools) and COSA (California Outdoor Schools Administration), is owned by San Diego County Office of Education and located in the Cuyamaca Rancho State Park and Cleveland National Forest in Descanso, California. During the school year students, generally 6th graders, come to learn subjects related to outdoor education, staying between four and five days. On campus there are several dormitory facilities, a dining hall, multipurpose room, activity building and infirmary. The construction of several new buildings on campus has been "certified gold" by the U.S. Green Building Council.
