= California State Route 79 =

State highway in California

State Route 79
- SR 79 highlighted in red; gaps represent the relinquished portions

Route information
- Maintained by Caltrans
- Length: 90.97 mi (146.40 km) Portions of SR 79 have been relinquished to or are otherwise maintained by local or other governments, and are not included in the length.

Major junctions
- South end: I-8 near Descanso
- SR 78 from Julian to Santa Ysabel; SR 76 near Lake Henshaw; SR 371 near Aguanga; I-15 in Temecula; SR 74 in Hemet
- North end: I-10 in Beaumont

Location
- Country: United States
- State: California
- Counties: San Diego, Riverside

Highway system
- State highways in California; Interstate; US; State; Scenic; History; Pre‑1964; Unconstructed; Deleted; Freeways
← SR 78	→ I-80

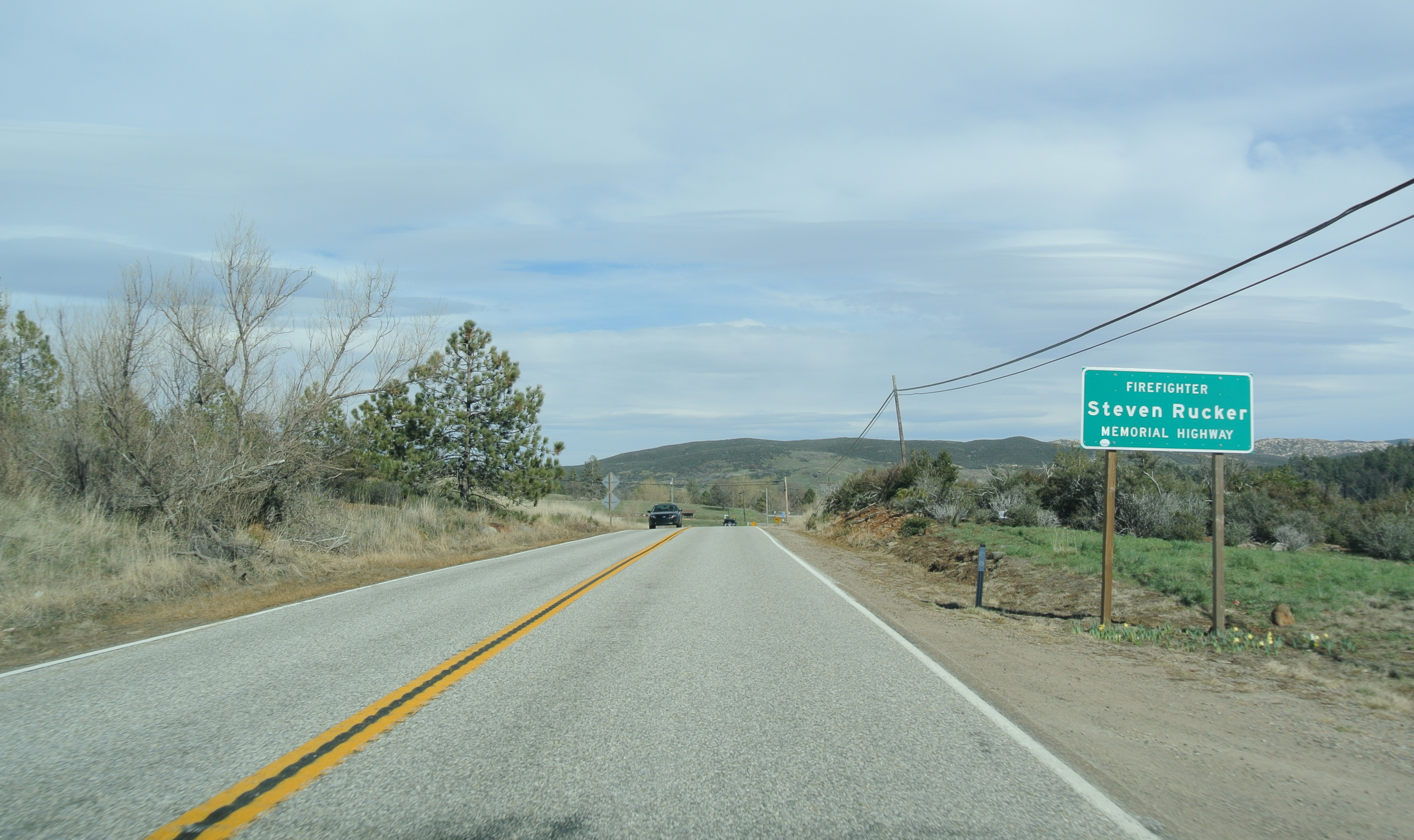
Steven Rucker Memorial Highway sign, looking north

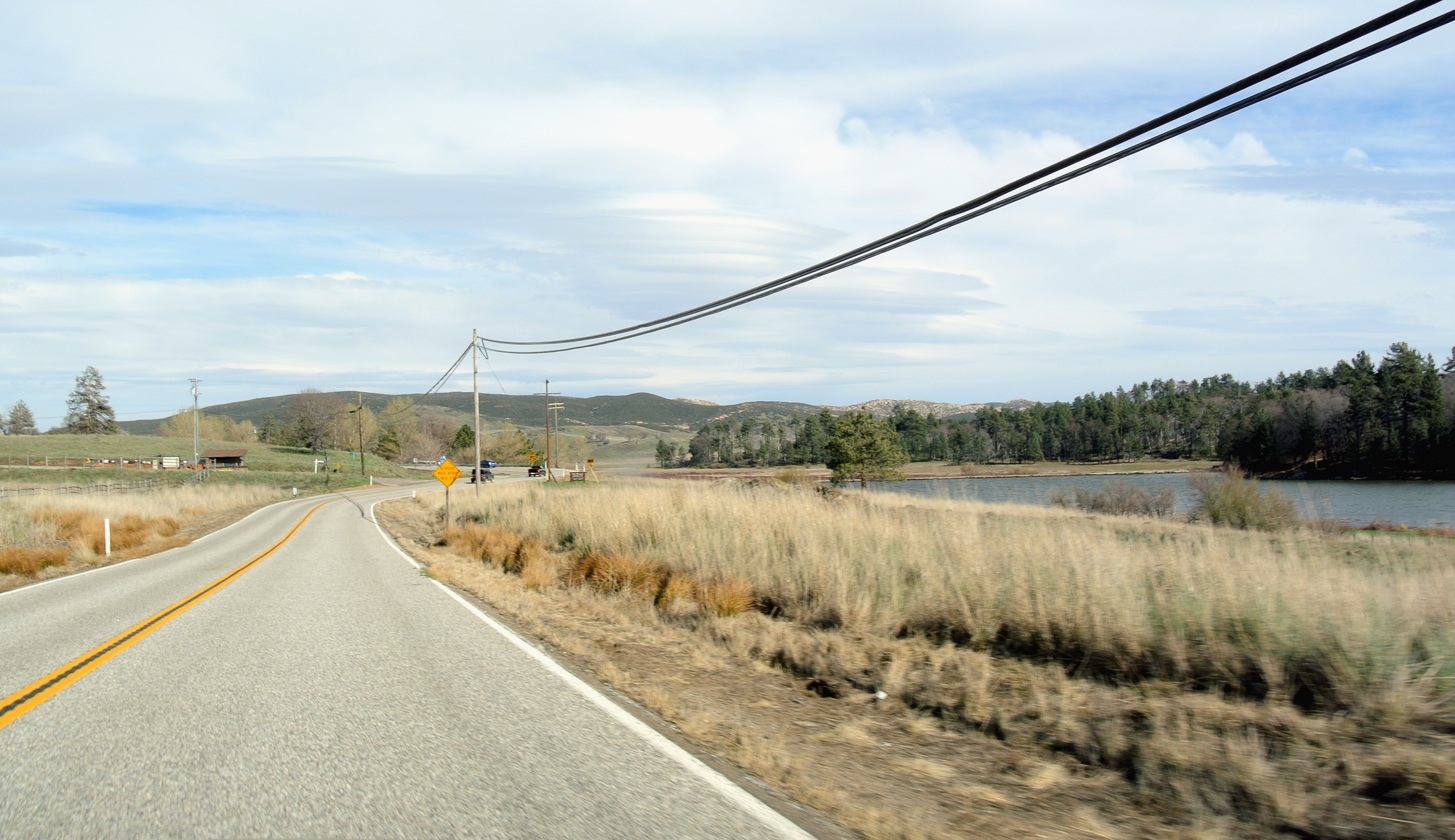
SR 79 looking north with Lake Cuyamaca on the right

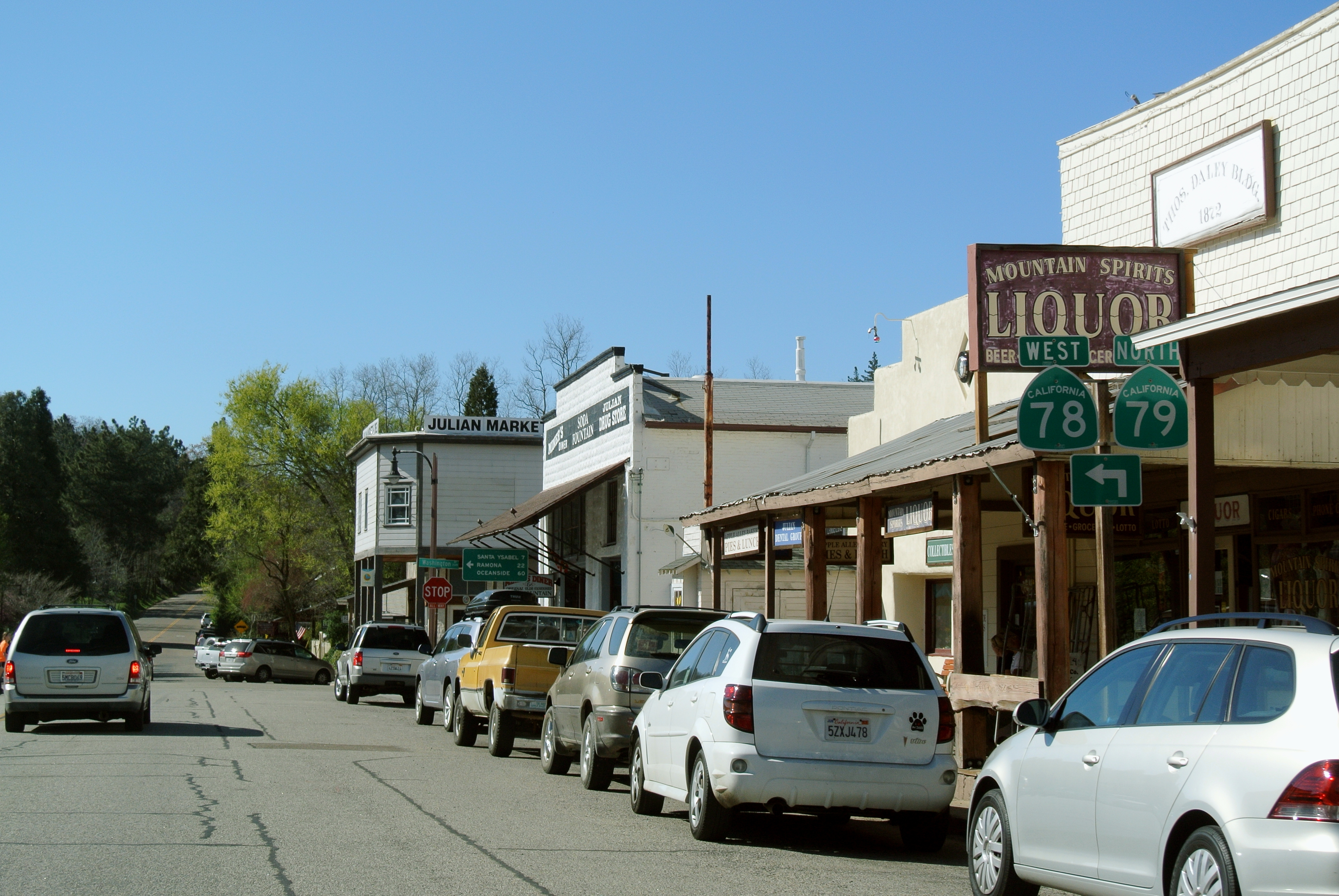
California State Route 78 and 79 in Julian

State Route 79 (SR 79) is an approximately 91-mile (146 km) north-south state highway in the U.S. state of California. The highway's southern terminus is at Interstate 8 (I-8) at the Descanso Junction in San Diego County. Its northern terminus is at Interstate 10 (I-10) in the city of Beaumont in Riverside County. In San Diego County, SR 79 connects with Lake Cuyamaca and Cuyamaca Rancho State Park, the communities of Julian and Warner Springs. In Riverside County, the highway runs through the cities of Temecula, Murrieta, Hemet, and San Jacinto before reaching Beaumont. Though some maps and signs may still mark SR 79 as continuous through the cities of Temecula and San Jacinto, control of segments within those cities were relinquished to those local jurisdictions and are thus no longer officially part of the state highway system.

== Route description ==
Route 79 is defined in section 379, subdivision (a), of the California Streets and Highways Code:

Route 79 is from:
(1) Route 8 near Descanso to Route 78 near Julian.
(2) Route 78 near Santa Ysabel to the Temecula city limits east of Butterfield Stage Road.
(3) Temecula city limits south of Murrieta Hot Springs Road to Route 74 near Hemet.
(4) Route 74 near Hemet to the San Jacinto city limit near Menlo Avenue.
(5) The San Jacinto city limit near Sanderson Avenue to Route 10 near Beaumont.

The definition omits the concurrencies with various other routes instead of duplicating those segments in those other routes' definitions in the code. And while control of former portions of Route 79 have been relinquished by the state to the cities of Temecula and San Jacinto, subdivision (b) further mandates that those cities must still "maintain within their respective jurisdictions signs directing motorists to the continuation of Route 79". Subdivision (c) further permits the state to relinquish control of the segment of Route 79 in Hemet.

SR 79 begins at I-8, about 35 miles (56 km) east of San Diego. The road runs along Old Highway 80 in the town of Descanso, until splitting to the north at a T intersection. The route then traverses Cuyamaca and Cuyamaca Rancho State Park on its way north. This portion of the route is very serpentine, with hairpin turns, as it follows the contours of the land by moving laterally, rather than up-and-down or via cuts.

It then overlaps SR 78 between Santa Ysabel and Julian, a distance of about eight miles (13 km). At Julian, both routes join at a T intersection just south of town, thus requiring a turn to stay on SR 79, and turn at an intersection in the northern portion of downtown. At Santa Ysabel, SR 79 comes to a T intersection with SR 78 running east–west. SR 79 continues northwest, meeting the eastern terminus of SR 76 near Lake Henshaw at the settlement of Morettis and passing through Warner Springs before crossing into Riverside County. SR 79 then meets the western terminus of SR 371 before going through Aguanga. It then passes Vail Lake and parallels Temecula Creek as it approaches the Temecula city limits, where it becomes a city-maintained road.

It overlaps I-15 for about three miles through Temecula. The ramps connecting SR 79 to I-15 are the first and third ramps northbound (second and fourth southbound) of those located between the Riverside/San Diego county line and the I-15/I-215 junction. In both cases, to enter SR 79 from I-15, one must head slightly east (although SR 79 is signed as a north–south highway). The southern exit from I-15 is known as Temecula Parkway. SR 79 exits from I-15 in the northern area of Temecula as Winchester Road. It then runs along the eastern city limits of Murrieta before passing by the reservoir at Diamond Valley Lake. SR 79 continues through the community of Winchester and turns east on SR 74 (Florida Avenue) west of Hemet. The section between the concurrencies with I-15 and SR 74 is signed as Winchester Road.

In Hemet, SR 79 overlaps SR 74/Florida Avenue, following it eastward for a few miles before heading north again through San Jacinto, where it also is a city-maintained road. SR 79 then goes over a range of hills (Lambs Canyon) and ends in Beaumont at Interstate 10. SR 79 is part of the California Freeway and Expressway System, and from the northern I-15 junction to I-10 is part of the National Highway System, a network of highways that are considered essential to the country's economy, defense, and mobility by the Federal Highway Administration. It is eligible for the State Scenic Highway System; however, it is not a scenic highway as defined by Caltrans. In 2012, SR 79 had an annual average daily traffic (AADT) of 1,550 between Paso Picacho Campground and Sunrise Highway, and 30,500 at Murrieta Hot Springs Road, the latter of which was the highest AADT for the highway.

== History ==
A stage road went through Oak Grove, and stagecoaches ran from 1858 to 1861 on a route from San Francisco to St. Louis and Memphis. A ranch house, Warner's Ranch, near Warner Springs was a stop on both the San Antonio–San Diego Mail and the Butterfield Overland Mail. A railroad line to Cuyamaca was under construction by 1887, though in 1889 the project encountered problems from workers departing to work in the nearby gold mines. By 1906, the stage road ran from Temecula through Warner Springs into Santa Ysabel and Ramona, and regularly scheduled automobile service was to begin in 1908 between San Diego and Warner Hot Springs.

That year, at a meeting between citizens of Oceanside and Escondido, each city proposed that a road from it to Warner Springs be constructed; the roads would meet somewhere in the San Luis Rey River valley. The president of the Escondido National Bank proposed a route from Escondido to Warner Springs shortly thereafter. Meanwhile, in 1911 The San Diego Union described the future road to Descanso, and described a "branch of the highway" that went through the Valley of the Pines "which for beauty cannot be surpassed in the United States" before continuing to Julian, the beginning of the San Luis Rey River, and Oceanside. However, the next year, the county highway commissioners determined that more funding would be needed to complete the road to Warner Springs.

By November 1912, the road to Warner Springs from San Diego was completed, including the part from Santa Ysabel, which had been widened. The road south of Julian to Decanso was open by 1916, but had a narrow crossing at the Cuyamaca dam, making the trip difficult. In 1922, the Automobile Club of Southern California noted that from Santa Ysabel to Julian, the road was in good repair, as well as from Cuyamaca to Descanso, even though the latter was a dirt road; the Julian to Cuyamaca road had "several soft spots". Seven years later, Julian residents expressed a desire to have the road from there to Descanso paved. Between Descanso and Temecula, what was to become SR 79 was defined as Route 78 in 1933. The Butterfield Overland Mail stage road was selected as the route of Imperial Highway.

In 1947, a contract to grade and pave part of what was known as State Sign Route 79 between Santa Ysabel and Julian was let, as paving of the highway progressed. The next year, plans were presented to realign part of the road between Julian and Cuyamaca, including one proposal to have it cross the lake. The California Chamber of Commerce made the suggestion in 1962 to convert SR 79 from Descanso to Julian to be an expressway. However, in 1968 those plans were called into question when the county planning commission recommended that the freeway be realigned away from Cuyamaca State Park, or not be built at all.

In the 1964 state highway renumbering, the highway was redefined as State Route 79, south of the junction with SR 71; from Temecula to that junction, the route was designated as SR 71 itself. In 1974, the part between the former junction with SR 71 and I-15 was added to SR 79, and removed from SR 71.

Originally, SR 79 was routed on Sage Road between Hemet and Radec.

The California State Legislature relinquished segments in Temecula and San Jacinto to those cities' control in 2004 and 2010, respectively.

Following the Cedar Fire in October 2003, utility poles and wires fell down on the highway, and the Cuyamaca area was heavily damaged. The next year, part of SR 79 from the western junction of SR 78 to Engineers Road near Lake Cuyamaca was renamed the Firefighter Steven Rucker Memorial Highway, after the firefighter from Novato who died while volunteering to fight the wildfire in Wynola. The City of Temecula proposed the construction of a four-lane road from State Route 79 that would bypass the city in 2005, though several obstacles to the plan, including aesthetic concerns and objections from the nearby Pechanga tribe, were noted. During the mid-2010s, the part of SR 79 through Winchester was widened to four lanes up to Domenigoni Parkway.

== Future ==
Due to increased traffic congestion through the San Jacinto Valley, there are plans to realign SR 79 to a new four-lane (eventually six-lane) limited-access expressway, spanning approximately 12 miles from East Newport Road to the southern end of the current divided highway portion at Ramona Expressway. The selected alignment would have access points at Domenigoni Parkway, Grand Avenue, SR 74 (Florida Avenue), Esplanade Avenue/Warren Road, Cottonwood Avenue, Sanderson Avenue, and Ramona Expressway, with additional grade separations at Stetson Avenue and Devonshire Avenue. An additional interchange with Mid County Parkway is proposed upon completion of that project. However, construction on the highway realignment has not begun because the project is only partially funded.

=== 79 realignment segment 3 ===
Riverside County Transportation Commission expects to start construction on the Realignment of SR 79 between Simpson Road to Newport Road by 2028 as an expressway. it is expected to cost 288 million

== Major intersections ==
Except where prefixed with a letter, postmiles were measured on the road as it was in 1964, based on the alignment that existed at the time, and do not necessarily reflect current mileage. Postmile prefixes include: R reflecting a realignment in the route since then, M indicating a second realignment, L referring to an overlap due to a correction or change, and T indicating postmiles classified as temporary. Segments that remain unconstructed or have been relinquished to local control may be omitted. The numbers reset at county lines; the start and end postmiles in each county are given in the county column.

County	Location	Postmile	Exit	Destinations	Notes
San Diego; SD L0.04-53.04		L0.04		Japatul Road	Continuation beyond I-8
San Diego; SD L0.04-53.04		L0.04		I-8 – El Centro, San Diego	Interchange; south end of SR 79; I-8 exit 40
San Diego; SD L0.04-53.04		0.00		Old Highway 80 – El Centro	Former US 80 east
San Diego; SD L0.04-53.04		14.44		CR S1 (Sunrise Highway) – Mount Laguna	
San Diego; SD L0.04-53.04	Julian	20.22 58.13 (Note: Indicates that the postmile represents the distance along SR 78 rather than SR 79.)		SR 78 east – Westmorland, Brawley	South end of SR 78 overlap
San Diego; SD L0.04-53.04	Santa Ysabel	51.11 20.23		SR 78 west / Washington Street – Ramona	North end of SR 78 overlap
San Diego; SD L0.04-53.04	Morettis Junction	27.37		SR 76 west – Lake Henshaw, Palomar Mountain, Oceanside	
San Diego; SD L0.04-53.04		31.70		CR S2 (San Felipe Road) – Ranchita, Borrego Springs	
Riverside; RIV 0.00-40.45	Aguanga	2.27		SR 371 east – Anza, Indio, Palm Desert	
Riverside; RIV 0.00-40.45	Radec	5.80		CR R3 north (Sage Road) – Hemet	
Riverside; RIV 0.00-40.45	Temecula	16.07		Butterfield Stage Road	North end of state maintenance
Riverside; RIV 0.00-40.45	Temecula	19.07		CR S16 south (Pechanga Parkway) – Pala	Former US 395 south
Riverside; RIV 0.00-40.45	Temecula	19.79 3.44 (Note: Indicates that the postmile represents the distance along I-15 rather than SR 79.)		I-15 south (Temecula Valley Freeway) / Temecula Parkway (to Old Town Front Street) – San Diego	Interchange; south end of I-15 overlap, I-15 exit 58
Riverside; RIV 0.00-40.45	Temecula	19.79 3.44	South end of freeway on I-15		
Riverside; RIV 0.00-40.45	Temecula	4.98	59	Rancho California Road, Old Town Front Street	
Riverside; RIV 0.00-40.45	Temecula	6.62 R2.28	North end of freeway on I-15		
Riverside; RIV 0.00-40.45	Temecula	6.62 R2.28		I-15 north (Temecula Valley Freeway) / Winchester Road – Riverside, Los Angeles	Interchange; north end of I-15 overlap, I-15 exit 61
Riverside; RIV 0.00-40.45	Murrieta	R4.78		Murrieta Hot Springs Road	South end of state maintenance
Riverside; RIV 0.00-40.45	Winchester	M7.63		Benton Road — Lake Skinner	
Riverside; RIV 0.00-40.45	Winchester	R16.67		Simpson Road	
Riverside; RIV 0.00-40.45	Hemet	R19.16 34.33 (Note: Indicates that the postmile represents the distance along SR 74 rather than SR 79.)		SR 74 west (Florida Avenue) / Vista Place – Perris, Riverside	South end of SR 74 overlap
Riverside; RIV 0.00-40.45	Hemet	36.92		Warren Road	Serves Hemet-Ryan Airport
Riverside; RIV 0.00-40.45	Hemet	40.59		CR R3 south (State Street)	
Riverside; RIV 0.00-40.45	Hemet	41.34 25.65		SR 74 east (Florida Avenue) / San Jacinto Street	North end of SR 74 overlap
Riverside; RIV 0.00-40.45	San Jacinto	27.48		Menlo Avenue	North end of state maintenance
Riverside; RIV 0.00-40.45	San Jacinto	28.17		Main Street, San Jacinto Avenue – Soboba Hot Springs	
Riverside; RIV 0.00-40.45	San Jacinto	29.88		State Street, Ramona Expressway	
Riverside; RIV 0.00-40.45	San Jacinto	32.30		Ramona Expressway, Sanderson Avenue	South end of state maintenance
Riverside; RIV 0.00-40.45	Gilman Hot Springs	M33.78		Gilman Springs Road	Interchange
Riverside; RIV 0.00-40.45	Beaumont	40.45		I-10 – Indio, Los Angeles	Interchange; north end of SR 79; I-10 exit 94
Riverside; RIV 0.00-40.45	Beaumont	40.45		Beaumont Avenue	Continuation beyond I-10
1.000 mi = 1.609 km; 1.000 km = 0.621 mi: Concurrency terminus
