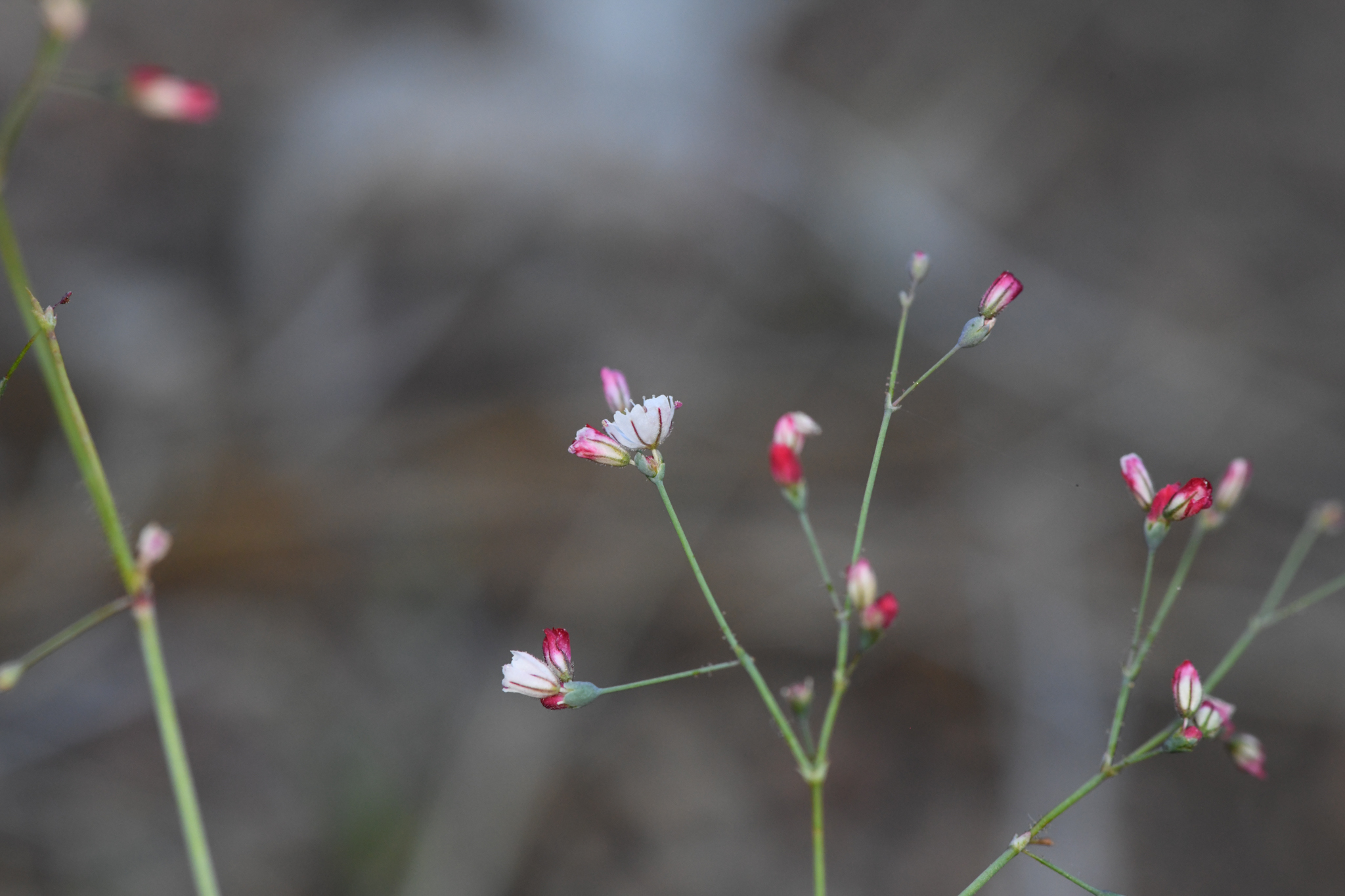

Conservation status
- Vulnerable (NatureServe)

Scientific classification
- Kingdom: Plantae
- Clade: Embryophytes
- Clade: Tracheophytes
- Clade: Angiosperms
- Clade: Eudicots
- Order: Caryophyllales
- Family: Polygonaceae
- Genus: Eriogonum
- Species: E. apiculatum

Binomial name
- Eriogonum apiculatum S.Watson

= Eriogonum apiculatum =

Species of wild buckwheat

Eriogonum apiculatum is a species of wild buckwheat known by the common name San Jacinto buckwheat. It is endemic to California, where it is known from the San Jacinto, Santa Rosa, Palomar, and Cuyamaca Mountains of San Diego and western Riverside Counties. Its habitat includes chaparral and wooded slopes on granite sands. This is an annual herb producing a spreading to erect, glandular stem up to 90 centimeters tall. The oblong leaves appear at the base of the plant. They are hairy and glandular in texture. Most of the stem is made up of the inflorescence, branching, spindly cyme with clusters of flowers at the tips of the branches. The individual flowers are under 3 millimeters wide and are white in color with reddish stripes.

== Taxonomy ==
The botanist Sereno Watson described and named Eriogonum apiculatum in 1882, placing it in the Eriogonum genus. Together with its genus it is classified in the Polygonaceae family and the species has one heterotypic synonym, Eriogonum apiculatum var. subvirgatum named by Susan Gabriella Stokes in 1937.
