= Fuego de los Muertos =

- Locations: San Diego, California
- Country: United States
- Inaugurated: October 2003
- Most recent: October 2007
- Participants: 520
- Website: www.fuegodelosmuertos.com (defunct)

Fuego de los Muertos (often abbreviated to FDLM) was an annual, Burning Man affiliated, regional decompression party event. It is organized by burners from San Diego and Orange County and is hosted in the rural and semi-arid eastern part of San Diego County.

The event takes usually takes place just before or after Halloween weekend and draws inspiration from four traditions: Burning Man, Samhain, Día de los Muertos and All Hallows' Eve.

== History ==
While 2004 was first year that there was an event of this name, it was the second decompression event that has taken place in San Diego. The prior event, known as "SD Decom," took place in 2003 and had an estimated attendance of 250. The 2003 event happened to coincide with the October wildfires of that year at a location that was nearly destroyed by fire.

In spite of the chilly and damp weather, FDLM managed to draw nearly 500 participants for 2004, perhaps double the attendance of the 2003 event. Two performance stages were set up for DJs, bands and belly dancers. The Mystic Art Grove had a score of art installations. Numerous theme camps were established, including the Purple Turtle Chill Zone, Liquid O, BubbleLounge, Fahrenheit 451, Vibestation, BRC Zendo, Satreheedn, Cantina de los Muertos and Haunted Chill Zone, Camp RVIP, Xara, the Massage Confessional, the Space Bars, Phat Elvis, and more. A wide variety of events took place including a fire eating workshop, Zen meditation, massages, and even a wedding.

In 2007 the event was hosted at The Village, a property just outside Borrego Springs, CA. The event sold out and attracted the largest number of participants to date. Artistic expression was limited due to permit restrictions and poor weather. Once again, the event was notably affected by wildfire; it took place just as the nearby California wildfires of October 2007 began. Highway closures affected some as they returned to San Diego.
