= KNSJ =

Community radio station in Descanso–San Diego, California

- Descanso, California; United States
- Broadcast area: Mountain Empire, San Diego
- Frequency: 89.1 MHz

Programming
- Format: Community radio; Free-form radio
- Affiliations: Pacifica Radio Network

Ownership
- Owner: Activist San Diego

History
- First air date: July 4, 2013
- Call sign meaning: "Networking for Social Justice"

Technical information
- Licensing authority: FCC
- Facility ID: 172605
- Class: B1
- ERP: 330 watts
- HAAT: 729 meters
- Transmitter coordinates: 32°53′31″N 116°25′8″W

Links
- Public license information: Public file; LMS
- Website: knsj.org

KNSJ ( 89.1 MHz) is a community radio station licensed to Descanso, California, and serving the Mountain Empire area. It first signed on the air on July 4, 2013. Content includes locally produced programs, as well as news and information from the BBC and Pacifica Radio. Spanish-language programming airs from 8 pm to 11 pm. The station's founder is Martin Eder.

In May 2023, KNSJ moved to a new studio inside the Employee Rights Center in San Diego.

In February 2026, the broadcast tower KNSJ rented on Monument Peak was destroyed by a winter storm. The station continued streaming online but predicted that it could be off of the airwaves for up to one year.

== See also ==
- List of community radio stations in the United States
