= Mid County Parkway =

Proposed highway in Riverside County, California, United States

Route information
- Maintained by RCTC
- Length: 16 mi (26 km)
- Status: Construction in progress

Major junctions
- West end: I-215 in Perris
- East end: SR 79 in San Jacinto

Location
- Country: United States
- State: California

Highway system
- County routes in California

The Mid County Parkway is a proposed 16-mile (26 km) highway in Riverside County, California, United States which would link San Jacinto in the east and Perris in the west in response to high levels on congestion on existing routes. The corridor was identified by the Riverside County Integrated Project. Construction began in 2020.

== Route description ==
The corridor is planned to begin at SR 79 in San Jacinto and follow or replace Ramona Expressway up to Lake Perris, where Ramona Expressway branches northwest, from where it will continue west. Options include a route west to Interstate 215, connecting to the interstate at Placentia Avenue, or turning north and connecting with Interstate 215 near Cajalco Expressway and Ramona Expressway.

The project originally consisted of a longer 32-mile (51 km) highway from San Jacinto through Perris, then replacing or following Cajalco Road to its interchange with Interstate 15 in Corona, but due to environmental, community and financial concerns, the $3 billion project was cut in half with the removal of the proposed Perris-to-Corona portion of the corridor.

== History ==
The Placentia Avenue interchange with I-215 is the first part of the Mid County Parkway to be completed. It was opened to traffic on December 13, 2022.
