= Descanso, California =

- Unincorporated community Census designated place
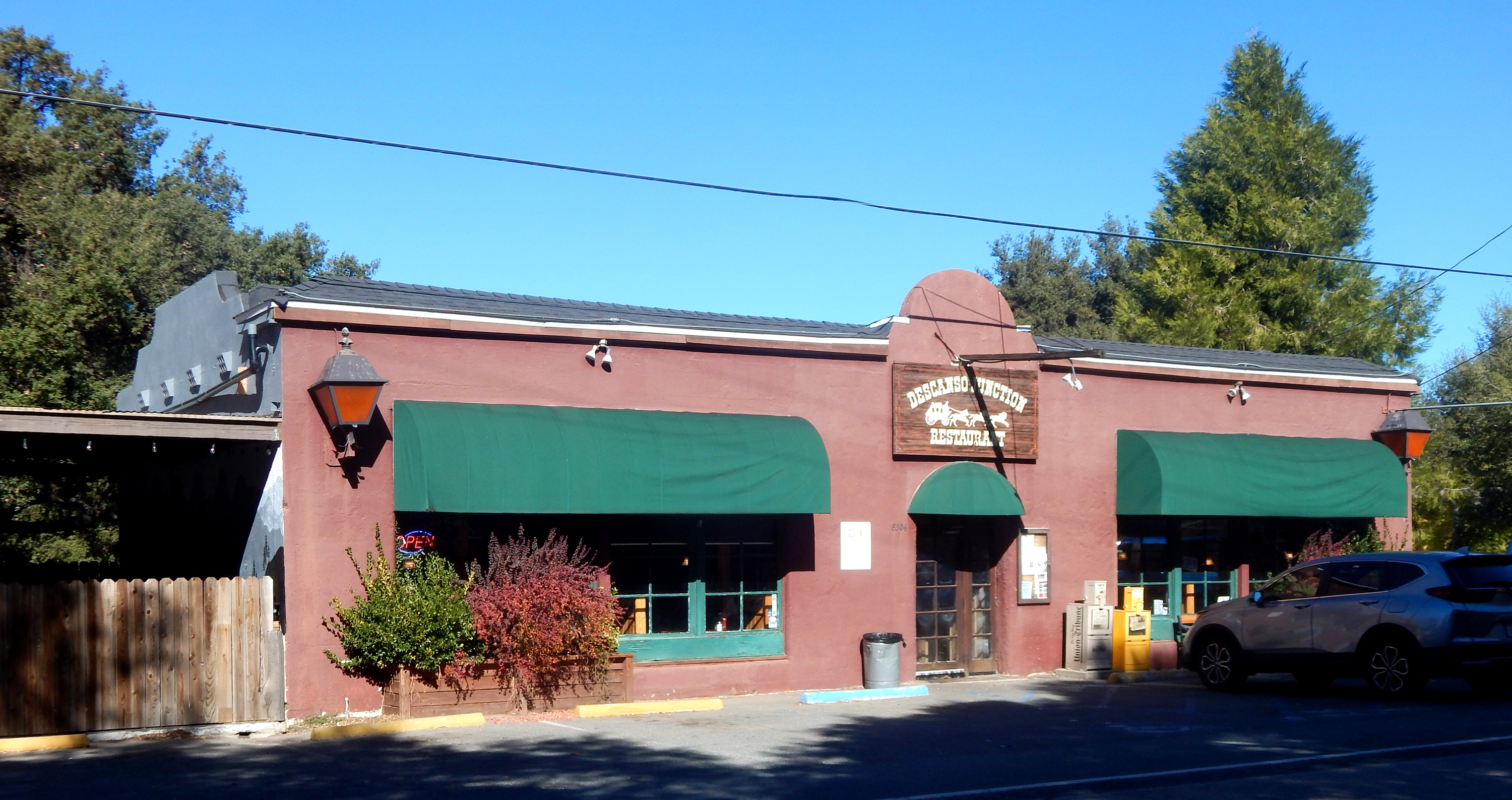
- The Descanso Junction restaurant

- Location of Descanso in San Diego County, California.

- Location within San Diego County Location within California Location within the United States
- Coordinates: 32°51′10″N 116°36′57″W
- Country: United States
- State: California
- County: San Diego

Area
  - Total: 19.15 sq mi (49.61 km^{2})
  - Land: 19.15 sq mi (49.61 km^{2})
  - Water: 0 sq mi (0.00 km^{2}) 0%
- Elevation: 3,573 ft (1,089 m)

Population (2020)
  - Total: 1,499
  - Density: 78.2/sq mi (30.21/km^{2})
- Time zone: UTC-8 (Pacific (PST))
  - Summer (DST): UTC-7 (PDT)
- ZIP codes: 91916
- Area code: 619
- FIPS code: 06-18940
- GNIS feature ID: 2582992

Descanso (Spanish for "Rest") is a small unincorporated community in the Cuyamaca Mountains, within the Mountain Empire area of southeastern San Diego County, California. The community's name is a Spanish word meaning "rest from labor".

The population was 1,499 at the 2020 census, up from 1,423 at the 2010 census. For statistical purposes, the United States Census Bureau categorizes Descanso as a census-designated place. It is in California's 48th congressional district.

Descanso is located east of Alpine and west of Pine Valley. At a 3,450 feet (1,050 m) elevation, it is located at the south entrance to Cuyamaca Rancho State Park and also borders Cleveland National Forest to the west and east.

The area was heavily threatened by the 2003 Cedar Fire. The community consists of many small ranches and newer homes of San Diego commuters. Horseback riding and hiking are frequent pastimes due to the proximity to San Diego's back-country recreation areas. It is approximately a 50-minute commute from downtown San Diego. The majority of residents generally commute to San Diego as the local job market is limited. Community radio station KNSJ operates out of Descanso.

The Descanso Fire Station of the United States Forest Service is home to the Laguna Hotshots. Descanso is home to many firefighters, and many local teenagers join either the Forest Service or the California Department of Forestry and Fire Protection (which also provides direct fire and EMS protection to the community).

The ZIP Code is 91916, and the community is inside area code 619.

== History ==
In 1884, a group of Spiritualists started Hulburd Grove. In 1898, the residents of the area started the Descanso school and the Descanso Town Hall. Peter Jacobs started the Descanso Park Addition in 1926.

== Geography ==
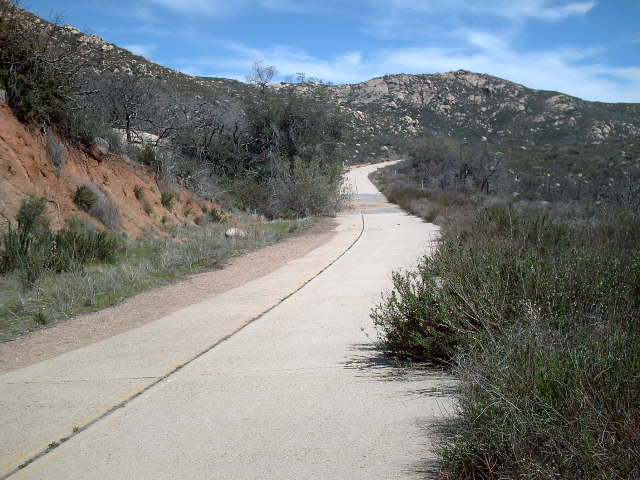
Old Highway 80, south and west of Descanso

According to the United States Census Bureau, the CDP covers an area of 19.2 square miles (49.8 km^{2}), all of it land.

=== Climate ===
According to the Köppen Climate Classification system, Descanso has a warm-summer Mediterranean climate, abbreviated "Csa" on climate maps.

== Demographics ==
Historical population
Census	Pop.	Note	%±
2010	1,423		—
2020	1,499		5.3%
U.S. Decennial Census; 1860–1870 1880-1890; 1900 1910 1920; 1930 1940 1950; 1960 1970 1980; 1990 2000 2010; 2020

Descanso first appeared as a census designated place in the 2010 U.S. census.

=== Racial and ethnic composition ===
Descanso CDP, California – Racial and ethnic composition Note: the US Census treats Hispanic/Latino as an ethnic category. This table excludes Latinos from the racial categories and assigns them to a separate category. Hispanics/Latinos may be of any race.
Race / Ethnicity (NH = Non-Hispanic)	Pop 2010	Pop 2020	% 2010	% 2020
White alone (NH)	1,198	1,148	84.19%	76.58%
Black or African American alone (NH)	5	5	0.35%	0.33%
Native American or Alaska Native alone (NH)	25	10	1.76%	0.67%
Asian alone (NH)	15	14	1.05%	0.93%
Native Hawaiian or Pacific Islander alone (NH)	8	0	0.56%	0.00%
Other race alone (NH)	5	9	0.35%	0.60%
Mixed race or Multiracial (NH)	17	83	1.19%	5.54%
Hispanic or Latino (any race)	150	230	10.54%	15.34%
Total	1,423	1,499	100.00%	100.00%

=== 2020 census ===
As of the 2020 census, Descanso had a population of 1,499. The population density was 78.3 inhabitants per square mile (30.2/km^{2}).

The whole population lived in households, and 0.0% of residents lived in urban areas while 100.0% lived in rural areas.

The age distribution was 274 people (18.3%) under the age of 18, 89 people (5.9%) aged 18 to 24, 302 people (20.1%) aged 25 to 44, 460 people (30.7%) aged 45 to 64, and 374 people (24.9%) who were 65 years of age or older. The median age was 50.5 years. For every 100 females, there were 100.7 males, and for every 100 females age 18 and over, there were 100.8 males age 18 and over.

There were 604 households, out of which 132 (21.9%) had children under the age of 18 living in them, 344 (57.0%) were married-couple households, 42 (7.0%) were cohabiting couple households, 103 (17.1%) had a female householder with no partner present, and 115 (19.0%) had a male householder with no partner present. 141 households (23.3%) were one person, and 72 (11.9%) were one person aged 65 or older. The average household size was 2.48. There were 415 families (68.7% of all households).

There were 673 housing units at an average density of 35.1 units per square mile (13.6 units/km^{2}), of which 604 (89.7%) were occupied. Of occupied units, 490 (81.1%) were owner-occupied, and 114 (18.9%) were occupied by renters. The homeowner vacancy rate was 0.0%, and the rental vacancy rate was 12.9%.

=== Income and poverty ===
In 2023, the US Census Bureau estimated that the median household income was $125,714, and the per capita income was $53,639. About 0.0% of families and 2.0% of the population were below the poverty line.

=== 2010 census ===
The 2010 United States census reported that Descanso had a population of 1,423. The population density was 74.1 inhabitants per square mile (28.6/km^{2}). The racial makeup of Descanso was 1,290 (90.7%) White, 5 (0.4%) African American, 29 (2.0%) Native American, 16 (1.1%) Asian, 9 (0.6%) Pacific Islander, 46 (3.2%) from other races, and 28 (2.0%) from two or more races. Hispanic or Latino of any race were 150 persons (10.5%).

The census reported that 1,423 people (100% of the population) lived in households, 0 (0%) lived in non-institutionalized group quarters, and 0 (0%) were institutionalized.

There were 585 households, out of which 152 (26.0%) had children under the age of 18 living in them, 326 (55.7%) were opposite-sex married couples living together, 44 (7.5%) had a female householder with no husband present, 27 (4.6%) had a male householder with no wife present. There were 33 (5.6%) unmarried opposite-sex partnerships, and 7 (1.2%) same-sex married couples or partnerships. 140 households (23.9%) were made up of individuals, and 54 (9.2%) had someone living alone who was 65 years of age or older. The average household size was 2.43. There were 397 families (67.9% of all households); the average family size was 2.82.

The population was spread out, with 256 people (18.0%) under the age of 18, 108 people (7.6%) aged 18 to 24, 260 people (18.3%) aged 25 to 44, 604 people (42.4%) aged 45 to 64, and 195 people (13.7%) who were 65 years of age or older. The median age was 49.0 years. For every 100 females, there were 101.8 males. For every 100 females age 18 and over, there were 103.0 males.

There were 696 housing units at an average density of 36.2 per square mile (14.0/km^{2}), of which 440 (75.2%) were owner-occupied, and 145 (24.8%) were occupied by renters. The homeowner vacancy rate was 3.3%; the rental vacancy rate was 9.4%. 1,086 people (76.3% of the population) lived in owner-occupied housing units and 337 people (23.7%) lived in rental housing units.

== Local attractions ==
Local attractions include:

- Laguna Mountains
- Viejas Casino
- Lake Cuyamaca
- Lake Morena
- Pacific Southwest Railway Museum
- Julian, nearby historical mining town
- Sweetwater River

== Local churches ==
- Chapel of the Hills Methodist Church
- Our Lady of Light Catholic Church

== Transportation ==
San Diego MTS route 888 provides service on Mondays and Fridays between El Cajon, Descanso, and Jacumba Hot Springs.
