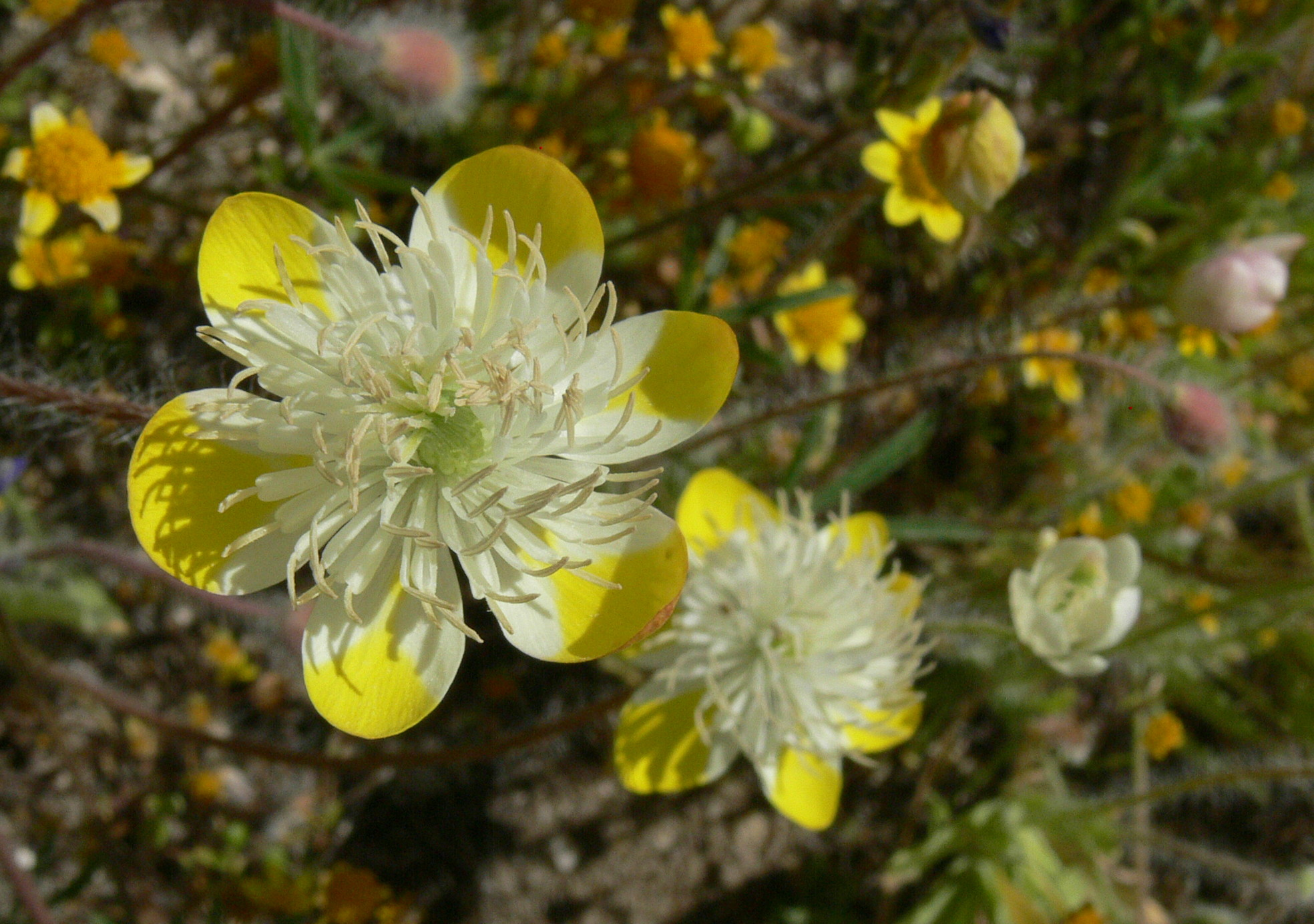

Conservation status
- Secure (NatureServe)

Scientific classification
- Kingdom: Plantae
- Clade: Tracheophytes
- Clade: Angiosperms
- Clade: Eudicots
- Order: Ranunculales
- Family: Papaveraceae
- Subfamily: Papaveroideae
- Tribe: Platystemoneae
- Genus: Platystemon; Benth.
- Species: P. californicus

Binomial name
- Platystemon californicus Benth.

= Platystemon =

Genus of flowering plants

Platystemon is a monotypic genus of flowering plants in the poppy family containing the single species Platystemon californicus, which is known by the common name creamcups. It is native to Oregon, California, Arizona, Utah and Baja California, and is found in open grasslands and sandy soils below 6,000 feet (1,800 m) elevation.

== Description ==
Platystemon californicus is a variable plant taking such a wide range of forms it has been split, reorganized, and redescribed as up to 57 different species. Its form often varies according to geography and habitat conditions. Coastal forms may be hairless and a bit succulent, while semidesert individuals can be squat, hairy plants. Some authors describe separate varieties, which are ecotypes adapted to specific, often very limited, habitat types.

The annual herb is usually at least a bit hairy, sometimes quite woolly. The stem is upright to decumbent and 3 to 30 centimeters long. The leaves are oppositely arranged or whorled about the stem. They are widely linear and smooth-edged with rounded or pointed tips. They are 1 to 9 centimeters long. The inflorescence is a single flower growing from a leaf axil or the tip of the stem. It is borne on a peduncle 3 to 26 centimeters long with three hairy sepals. The flower usually has six petals, but a large flower can have more. The petals vary in size, shape, and color. They measure 6 to 19 millimeters long and have rounded or pointed tips. There are five basic color patterns: solid white, solid yellow, and a white petal with a yellow tip or yellow base or both. The all-yellow petals are less common. The petals may age reddish. The center of the flower is filled with several whorls of stamens with thickened ends. The fruit is a capsule up to 1.6 centimeters long which is divided into many sections containing shiny black seeds.

The flowers are partly wind-pollinated and partly pollinated by solitary bees.

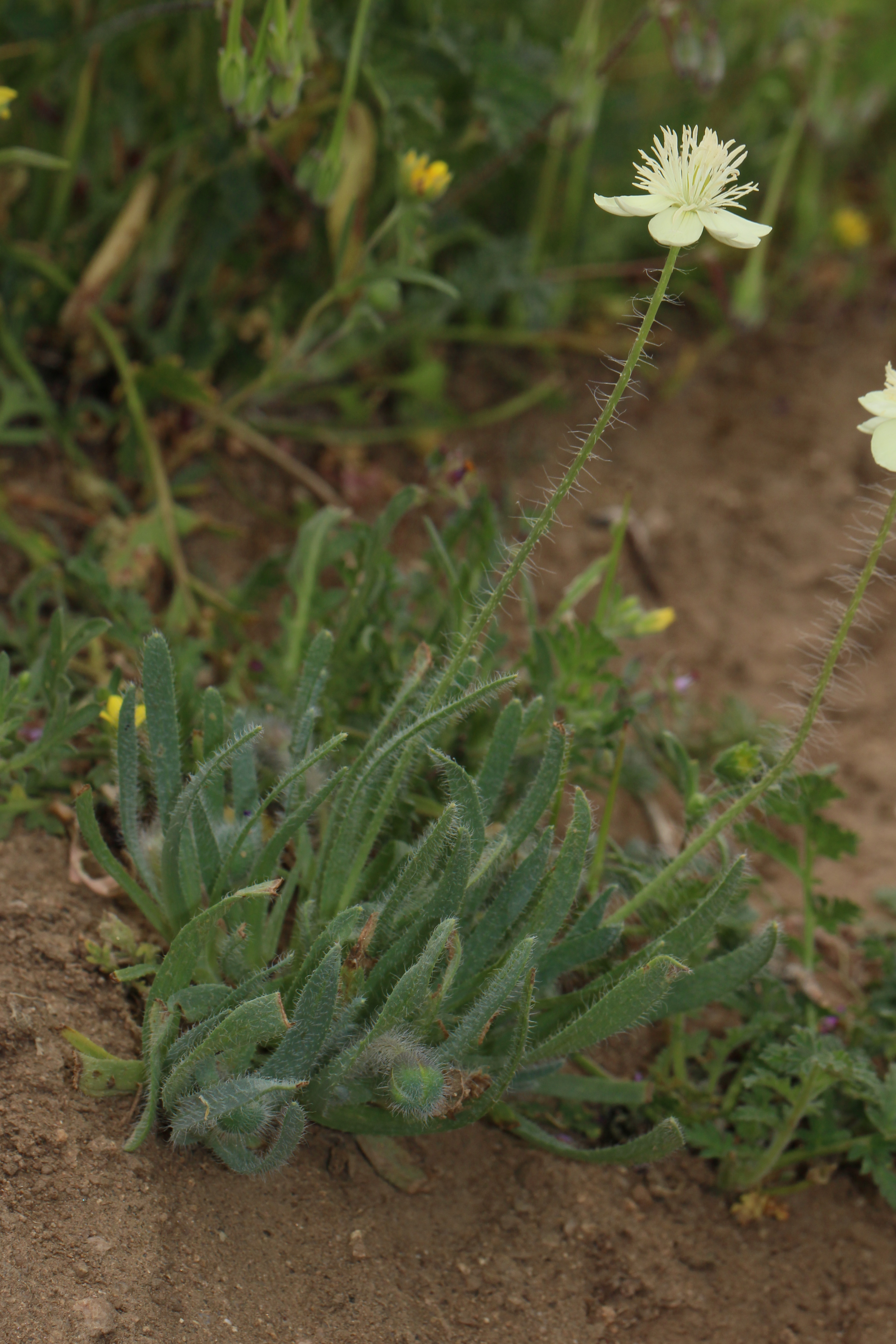
Desert individuals may be quite woolly or shaggy with whorled basal leaves. Flower buds are nodding with three overlapping and loosely touching sepals.
