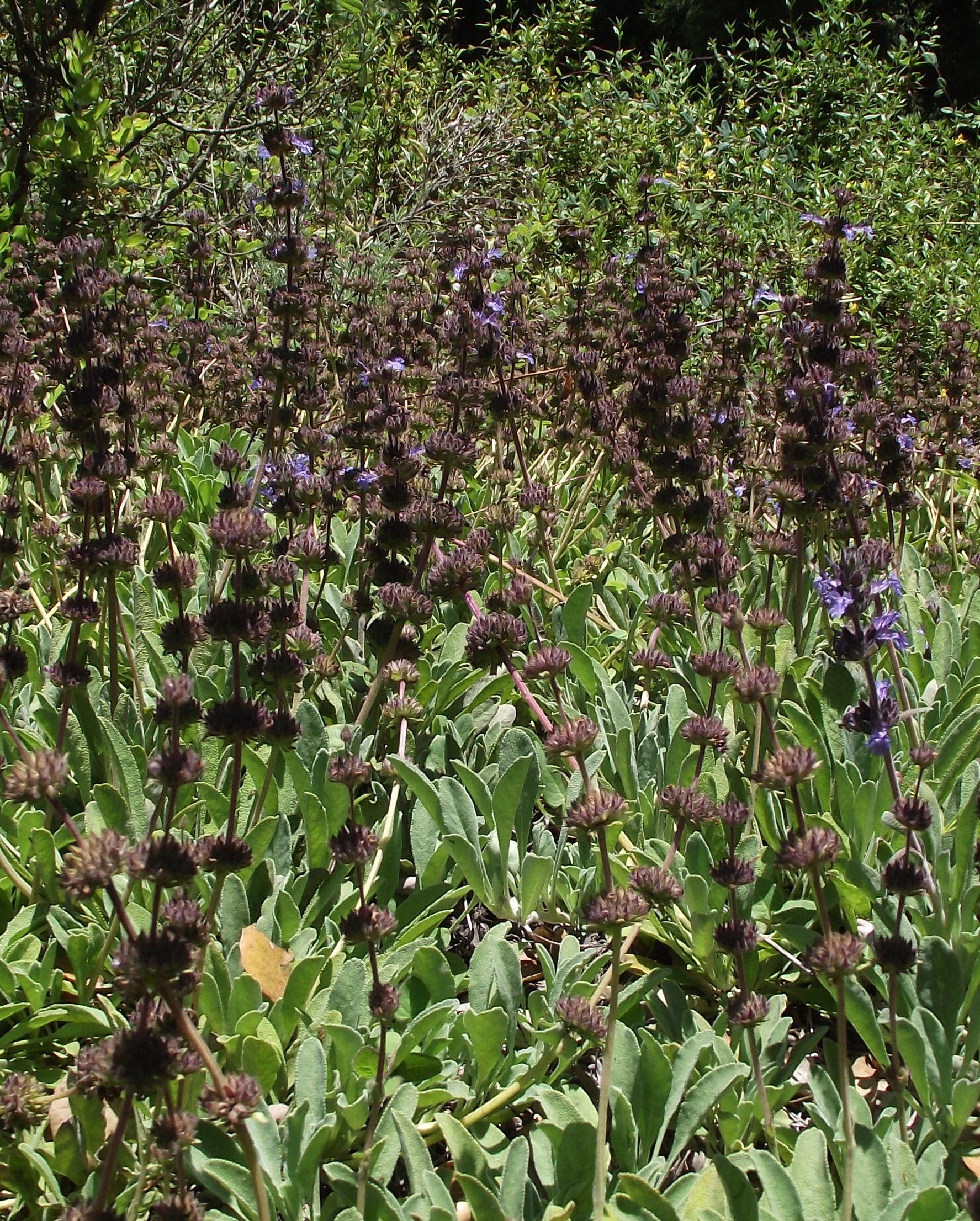

Conservation status
- Secure (NatureServe)

Scientific classification
- Kingdom: Plantae
- Clade: Tracheophytes
- Clade: Angiosperms
- Clade: Eudicots
- Clade: Asterids
- Order: Lamiales
- Family: Lamiaceae
- Genus: Salvia
- Species: S. sonomensis

Binomial name
- Salvia sonomensis Greene

Synonyms
- Audibertia humilis Benth.; Audibertiella humilis (Benth.) Briq.; Ramona humilis (Benth.) Greene

= Salvia sonomensis =

Species of flowering plant

Salvia sonomensis (Sonoma sage, creeping sage) is a low-growing perennial plant that is endemic to California.

== Description ==
Salvia sonomensis, as suggested by its common name "creeping sage", is a mat-forming subshrub with stems growing up to about 30 cm (12 in) tall, with 15 cm (5.9 in) inflorescences that stand above the foliage. The species is highly variable in leaf shape and size and in flower color. Leaves can be long and narrow, or shorter and rounded, with leaf color also showing a wide range from yellow-green to gray-green. Flowers can be pale lavender, lavender-purple, or lavender-blue.

== Taxonomy ==
The specific epithet, sonomensis, refers to Sonoma County, California, one of the areas where it is found.

== Distribution and habitat ==
S. sonomensis is found in three distinct areas in California: the California Coastal Range from Siskiyou to Napa county; from Monterey county to San Diego county; and in the Sierra Nevada foothills. It can be found growing under 2,000 m (6,600 ft) elevation on dry hillsides and woodlands.

== Cultivation ==
Salvia sonomensis is easy to grow in cultivation, except in heavy clay soils and where there is too much irrigation. There are several different varieties, based on the different leaf types and flower colors. Two particularly hardy selections that were chosen from higher elevations are 'Cone Peak' and 'Serra Peak'. 'John Farmar-Bowers' is a white flowered variety. There are also two hybrids that are believed to be a cross between S. sonomensis and S. mellifera: 'Dara's Choice' and 'Mrs. Beard'.

== Stimulant use ==
According to Dale Pendell, in his book Pharmako/poeia, "Salvia sonomensis contains a camphorlike substance that is a mild stimulant when smoked."
