= Lake Cuyamaca =

Reservoir and park in California, US

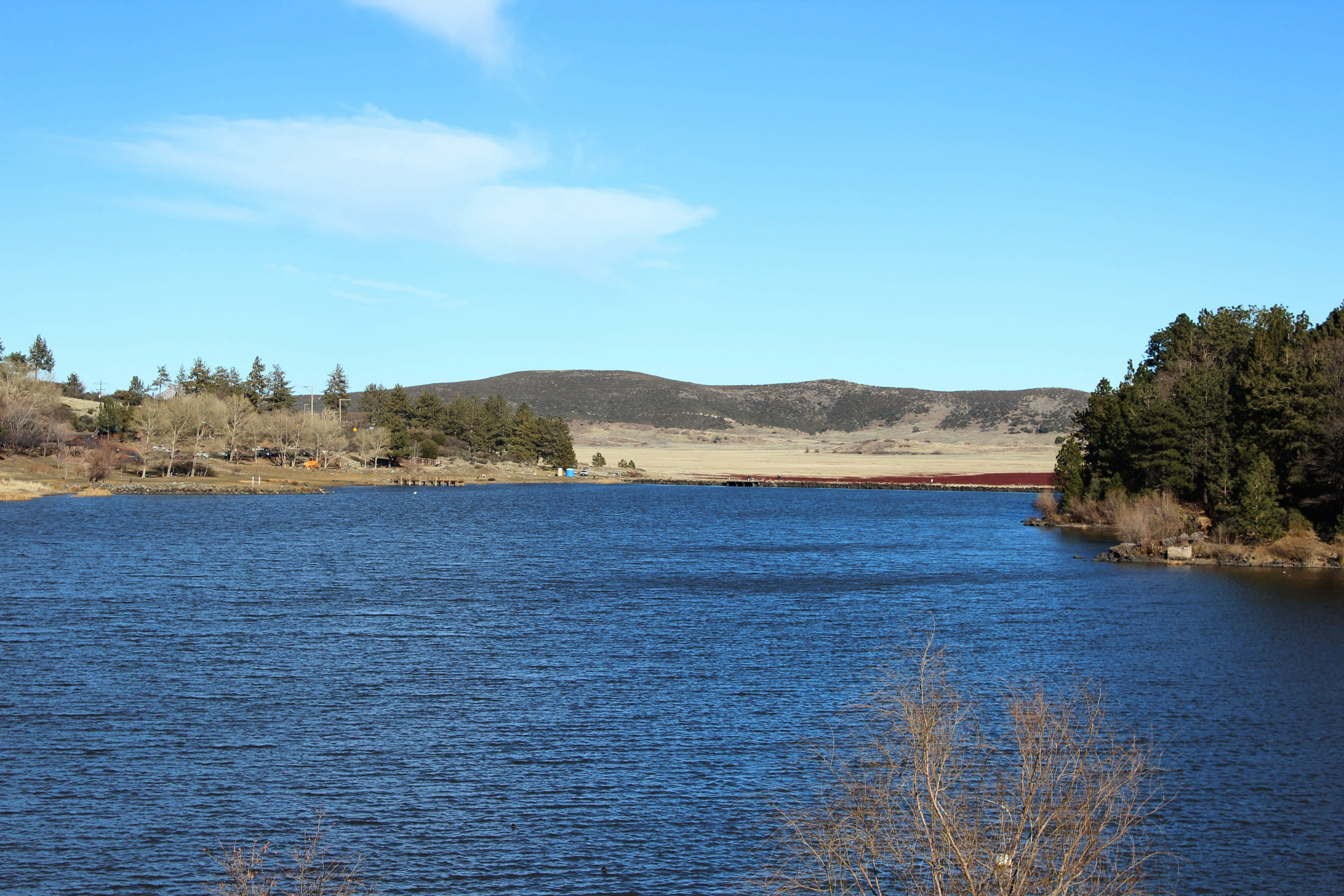
- Lake Cuyamaca in 2022

- Location within San Diego County, California Location within California Location within the United States
- Location: Cuyamaca Mountains, San Diego County, California
- Coordinates: 32°59′11″N 116°34′50″W
- Type: Reservoir
- Basin countries: United States
- Managing agency: Helix Water District
- Built: 1888
- Surface area: 110 acres (45 ha)
- Surface elevation: 4,613 feet (1,406 m)
- Website: www.lakecuyamaca.net

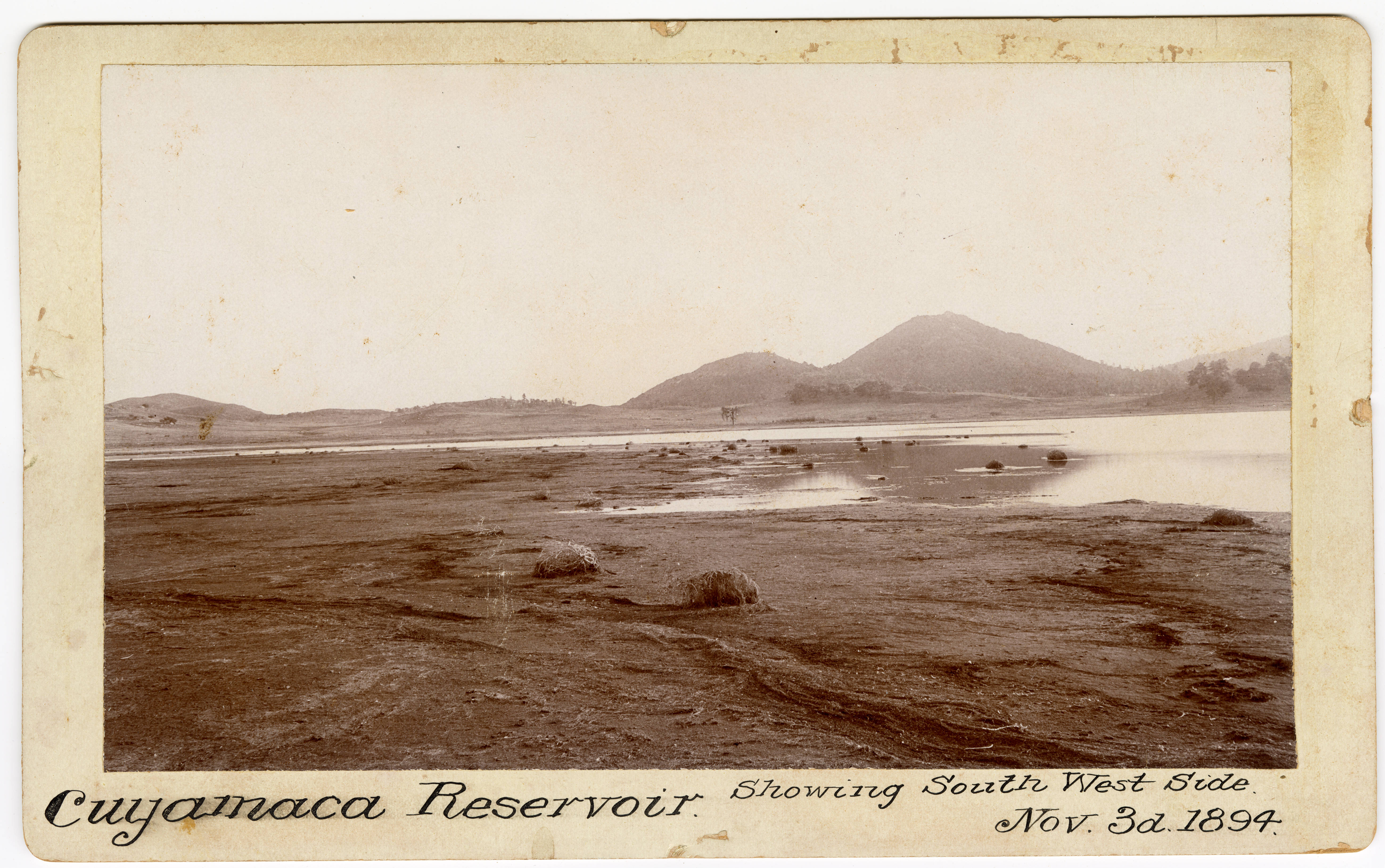
Taken in 1894, is a picture of Cuyamaca Reservoir showing the South West Side

Lake Cuyamaca, also called Cuyamaca Reservoir, is a reservoir, nature park and recreation area in the eastern Cuyamaca Mountains. It covers 110 acres (45 ha) in East County, San Diego.

== Geography ==
California State Route 79 wraps around three shores, and provides access to/from Julian to the north and I−8 to the south.

Lake Cuyamaca is 2 miles (3.2 km) north of the Paso Picacho Campground and its trailheads in Cuyamaca Rancho State Park.

== History ==
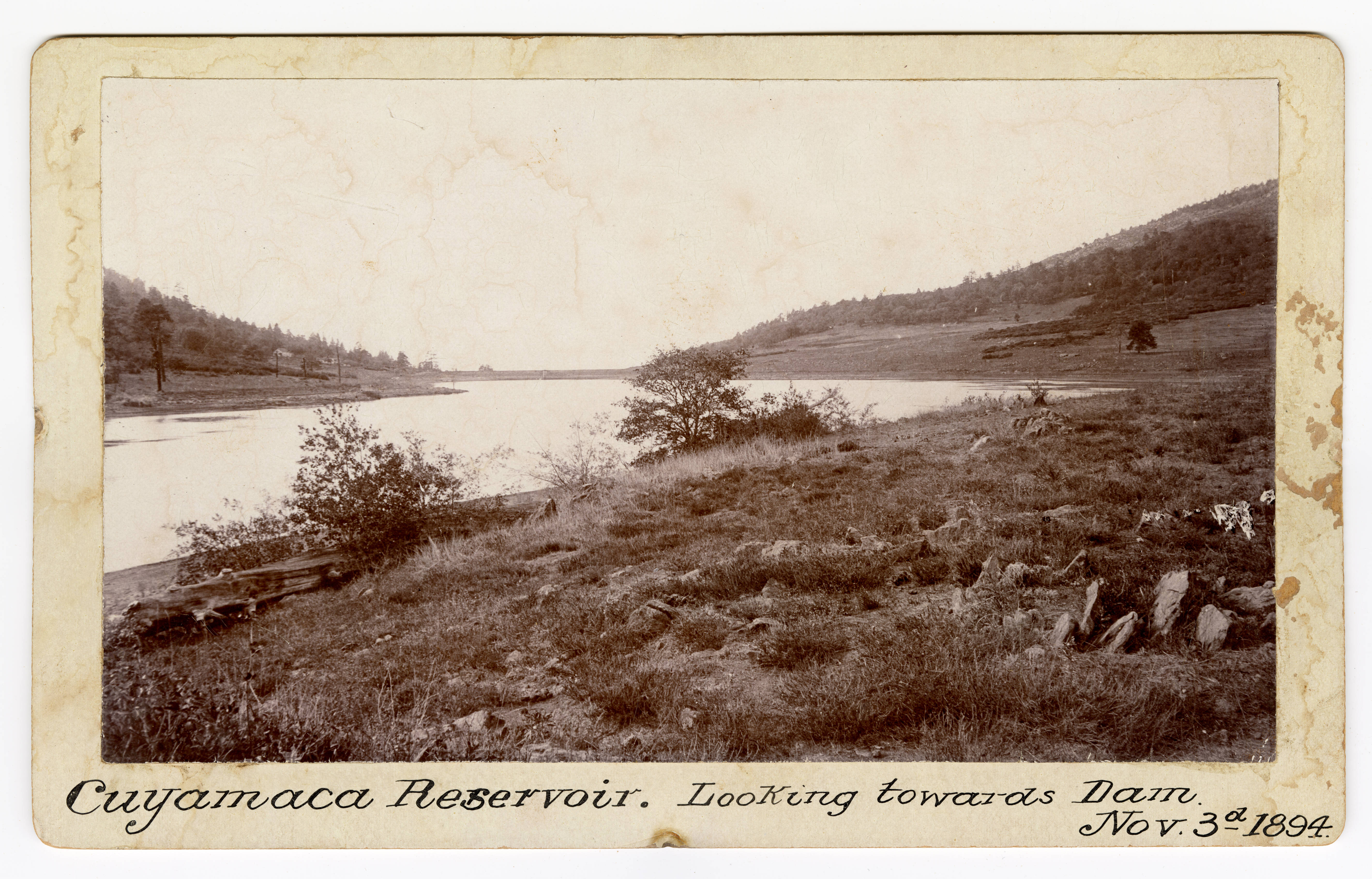
Lake Cuyamaca in 1894, 6 years after the dam's construction

The dam at Lake Cuyamaca is the second-oldest in California still in use, and was completed in 1888. It was built to supply drinking water to the city of San Diego. It was originally piped down to San Diego in wooden flumes. It continues to be part of a municipal water supply system for the Helix Water District.

In the mid-1960s, the Lake Cuyamaca Recreation and Park District was formed. Through various projects over time, it has created a more permanent water supply infrastructure and new recreation features at the reservoir.

== Recreation ==
Lake Cuyamaca is a recreation area operated by the Lake Cuyamaca Recreation and Park District and the Helix Water District. It offers boating, fishing, picnicking, birdwatching, hiking, wedding and party venues, cabin rentals and camping. A store, restaurant, pub, and tackle shop are onsite, as well as boat rentals.

The reservoir is stocked with over 38,000 lbs. of trout annually, and is the only San Diego lake that is able to stock trout all year long. Other species of fish include Florida bass, smallmouth bass, channel catfish, crappie, bluegill and sturgeon.

Conical Middle Peak is above the area on the west, and North Peak on the north. Hiking trails reach the summit of Cuyamaca Peak, located to the southwest of Lake Cuyamaca and in Cuyamaca Rancho State Park.

== See also ==
- Lake Cuyamaca (Wikimedia Commons)
- Cuyamaca Rancho State Park
- List of dams and reservoirs in California
- Parks in San Diego County, California
