= Cuyamaca Mountains =

Mountain range in southern California

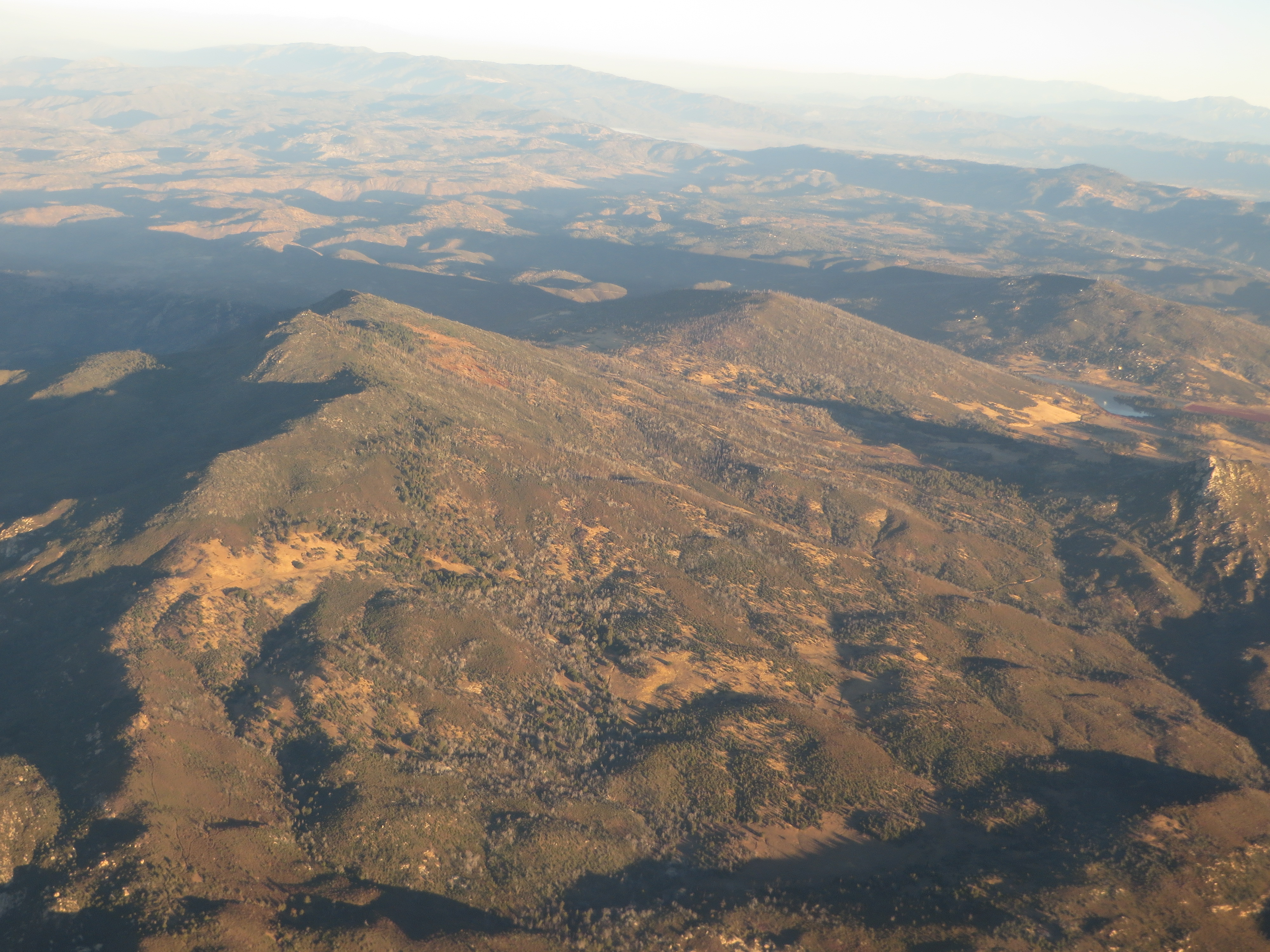

Highest point
- Peak: Cuyamaca Peak
- Elevation: 1,985 m (6,512 ft)

Geography
- Location within California Location within San Diego County, California
- Country: United States
- State: California
- District: San Diego County
- Range coordinates: 32°56′31.174″N 116°36′14.070″W
- Topo map: USGS Cuyamaca Peak

The Cuyamaca Mountains (Kumeyaay: ‘Ekwiiyemak), locally the Cuyamacas, are a mountain range of the Peninsular Ranges in San Diego County, California. The mountain range runs roughly northwest to southeast. The Laguna Mountains are directly adjacent to the east, with Palomar Mountain and Hot Springs Mountain more distant to the north.

Most of the range consists of extensive oak forest and chaparral, part of the California montane chaparral and woodlands ecoregion, interspersed with pine forests and lush riparian zones, featuring year round creeks and waterfalls. The San Diego River and Sweetwater River both have their headwaters in these mountains, which flow over 50 miles to the ocean. The pine forests were extensively burned by the 2003 Cedar Fire, along with many large areas of chaparral and oak woodland, which has since experienced slow and steady regrowth.

The high elevation produces a risk of snowfall throughout the winter months. Cuyamaca Peak, at 6,512 feet (1,985 m), is San Diego County's second highest, after Hot Springs Mountain.

== Geography ==
The range's highest peaks are Cuyamaca Peak at 6,512 feet (1,985 m), North Peak at 5,993 feet (1,827 m), Middle Peak at 5,883 feet (1,793 m), and Stonewall Peak at 5,700 feet (1,700 m). The San Diego River and the Sweetwater River both have headwaters in the Cuyamacas. The Cuyamaca Reservoir lies adjacent to the east side of the range.

Mountains are primarily protected within the Cleveland National Forest. Cuyamaca Rancho State Park, with California oak woodlands habitat, is located in the range.

The former mining town of Julian is in the northern section, and the towns of Descanso, Pine Valley and Guatay is in the southern. Alpine, a more populated town with some dense residential development, lies directly to the west of the range, bordering the Lakeside and El Cajon areas.

Interstate 8 passes through the southern part of the Cuyamaca Mountains. California State Route 79, known as the Cuyamaca Highway, runs north–south along the eastern part of the mountains.

== Gold rush ==
Gold was discovered in the Cuyamacas in 1870 and the mountains were subject to a gold rush. Towns and encampments of Coleman City, Branson City, Eastwood, Julian, and Banner sprang up to support the miners. First there was a mining camp called Stonewall (1873–1876), then the company town of Stratton (1887–1888), renamed Cuyamaca City (1888–1906), had a peak population of 500 and served the Stonewall Mine. The town was abandoned after mining operations ceased, and few traces of it exist. The site of the town now lies within Cuyamaca Rancho State Park. Other gold mines were supported by the town of Julian, which celebrates its mining history with an annual festival called Gold Rush Days. The Eagle-High Peak Mine, no longer productive, is now a museum and gives daily tours.

== See also ==
- California chaparral and woodlands
- California mixed evergreen forest
- California montane chaparral and woodlands
