= Cedar Fire =

2003 wildfire in Southern California

- Part of the 2003 California wildfires
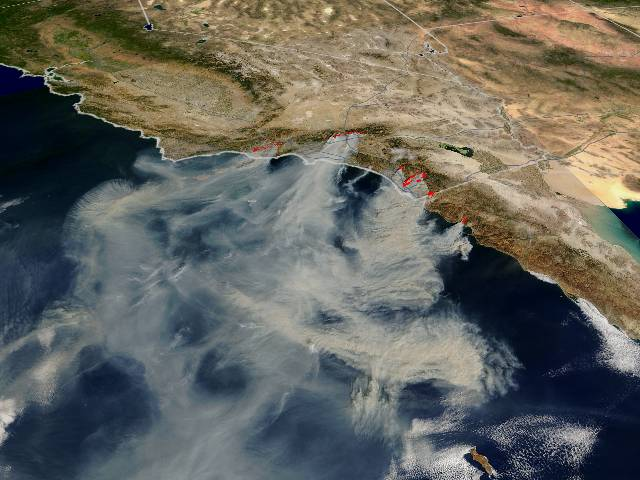
- A dozen simultaneous wildfires in October 2003; the Cedar Fire is the group of large red dots right of center.
- Date: October 25, 2003 –; November 5, 2003; (12 days)
- Location: San Diego County, California, United States
- Coordinates: 33.016667°N 116.683333°W

Statistics
- Burned area: 273,246 acres (1,106 km^{2})

Impacts
- Deaths: 14 civilians; 1 firefighter
- Injuries: 113
- Structures destroyed: 2,232 residential; 22 commercial; 566 outbuildings
- Cost: At least $1.331 billion (2003 USD)

Ignition
- Cause: Signal fire

Map
- Perimeter of Cedar Fire
- Location of Cedar Fire in Southern California Cedar Fire (southern California)

The Cedar Fire was a massive, highly-destructive wildfire, which burned 273,246 acres (1,106 km^{2}) of land in San Diego County, California, during October and November 2003. The fire's rapid growth was driven by the Santa Ana winds, causing the fire to spread at a rate of 3,600 acres (15 km^{2}) per hour. By the time the fire was fully contained on November 4, it had destroyed 2,820 buildings (including 2,232 homes) and killed 15 people, including one firefighter. Hotspots continued to burn within the Cedar Fire's perimeter until December 5, 2003, when the fire was fully brought under control.

The fire remains one of the largest wildfires in California history and, as of July 2023, the tenth-largest wildfire in the state's modern history. According to CALFIRE, it is also the sixth-deadliest and fourth-most destructive wildfire in state history, causing just over $1.3 billion in damages. In November 2018, the Camp Fire (2018) surpassed the Tubbs Fire (which had previously surpassed the 1991 Oakland Firestorm and the Cedar Fire) to become the single most destructive wildfire in California history, in terms of the number of buildings destroyed. In December 2017, the Thomas Fire surpassed the Cedar Fire to become California's largest modern wildfire on record, before the Mendocino Complex Fire's Ranch Fire surpassed both fires to become the state's largest wildfire in August 2018.

== Fire progression ==
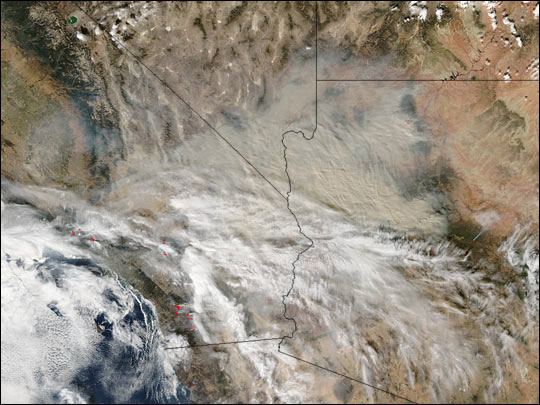
Smoke from the fires drifts toward Arizona and Nevada, after the wind shifted on October 29

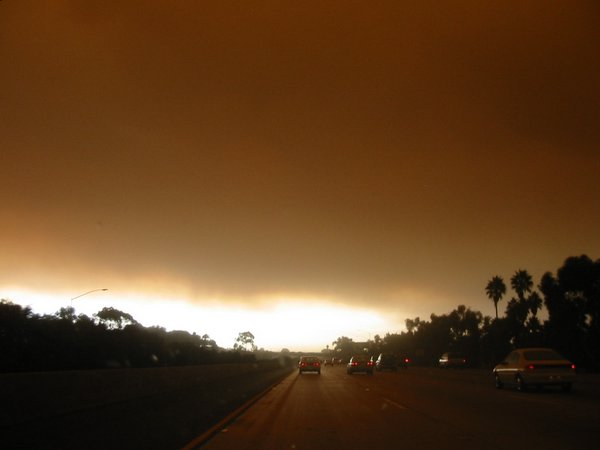
View of the Cedar Fire from southbound Interstate 5 near Pacific Beach, on the first morning of the fire

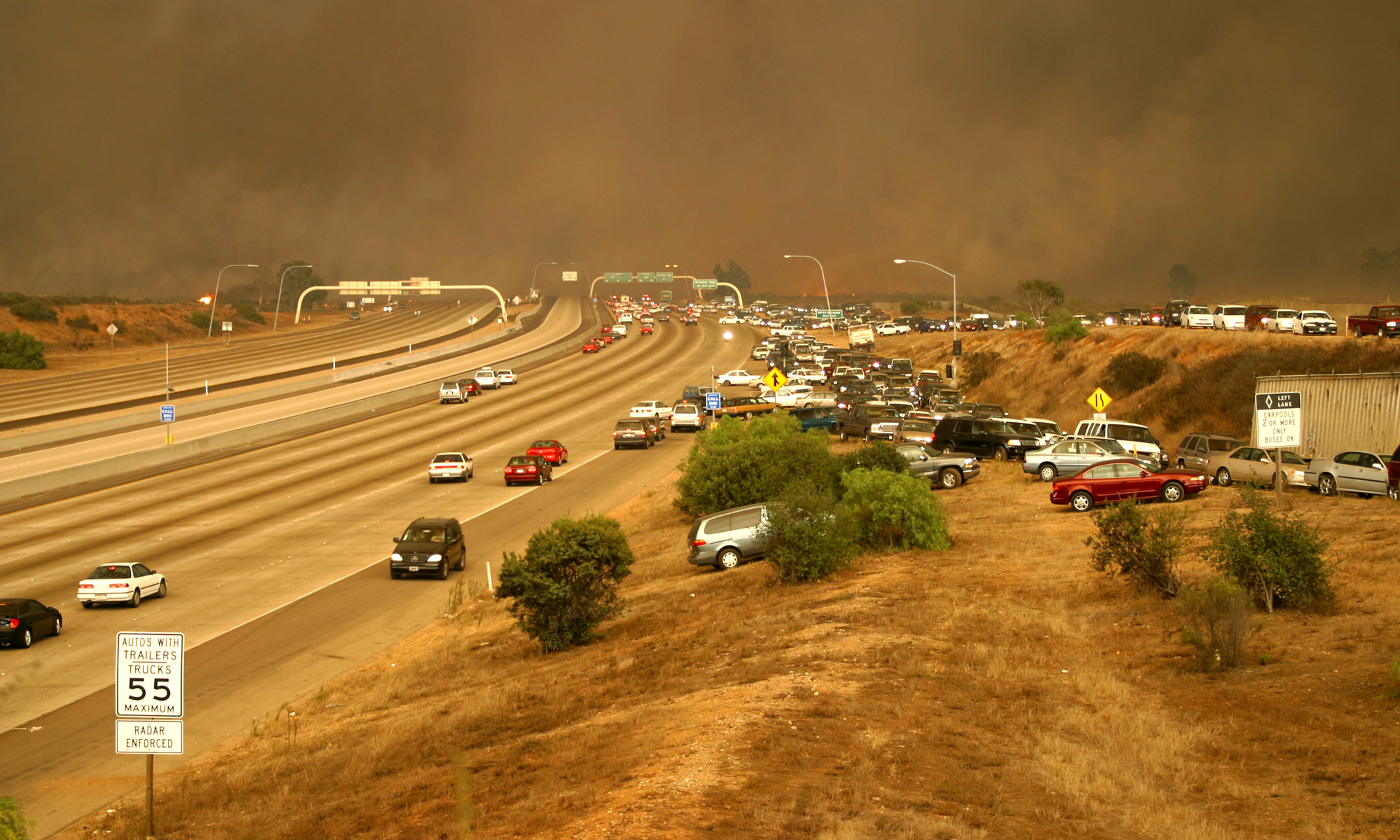
Drivers scramble up the embankment to escape from Interstate 15, as the Cedar Fire crosses the freeway

The Cedar Fire began in the Cuyamaca Mountains within the Cleveland National Forest. It was first reported at 5:37 p.m. PDT on October 25, 2003, to the south of Ramona in central San Diego County. At the time it began, at least eleven other wildfires were actively burning in Southern California. Within ten minutes of the initial report, the U.S. Forest Service had deployed 10 fire engines, two water tenders, two hand crews and two chief officers. Within 30 minutes, 320 firefighters and six fire chiefs were en route. An ASTREA helicopter of the San Diego County Sheriff's Department that was rescuing a hunter spotted the fire at about the same time as the first phone report was received and called for an air response. Another sheriff's helicopter equipped with a Bambi Bucket was dispatched to drop water on the fire. When the helicopter was only minutes away from the fire, a Forest Service fire chief cancelled the water drop because policy required the cutoff of aerial firefighting 30 minutes before sunset, a decision which was later severely criticized by the public, media, and other elected officials.

Between the time the fire started and midnight, the predicted strong easterly Santa Ana winds surfaced and the fire burned approximately 5,319 acres. By 3:00 a.m., 62,000 acres (250 km^{2}) had burned. Overnight, the fast-moving fire killed 12 people living in Wildcat Canyon and Muth Valley in the northern part of Lakeside, who had little or no warning that the fire was approaching. The fire destroyed 39 homes on the Barona Indian Reservation. In only a few hours, the Cedar Fire pushed southwest over 30 miles (48.3 km) and burned over 100,000 acres (400 km^{2}) at rates of up to 6,000 acres (24 km^{2}) per hour. The fire also crossed several large highways, including Interstate 15, and by noon on October 26, the fire was burning hundreds of homes in the Scripps Ranch community of San Diego, and was threatening many others.

On October 26, the fire forged into Alpine, Harbison Canyon, Lake Jennings and Crest, burning hundreds more homes in areas that had been devastated by the Laguna Fire 33 years earlier. By October 28, the strong easterly Santa Ana winds died down and the fire turned east, consuming another 114,000 acres (460 km^{2}). The entire community of Cuyamaca, most of nearby Cuyamaca Rancho State Park, and more than 500 homes surrounding the town of Julian were destroyed.

On October 29, a group of firefighters attempting to defend a house in Riverwood Estates, near Santa Ysabel, became entrapped and overrun by the fire. One firefighter died. Another firefighter sustained severe injuries, and two others were hurt. Firefighters finally achieved full containment of the Cedar Fire on November 3, and the Cedar Fire was completely brought under control on December 5.

== Impacts ==
In the wake of the 2003 firestorm, including the Cedar Fire, California Governor Arnold Schwarzenegger (Gray Davis was still governor) declared a state of emergency and activated the National Guard to assist in the disaster relief process. President George W. Bush declared Los Angeles, San Bernardino, San Diego and Ventura counties major disaster areas. Air travel in and around the region was also disrupted due to the effect on air traffic control radar.

San Diego's Qualcomm Stadium was used as an evacuation site, forcing the NFL to move the Monday Night Football game on October 27 between the San Diego Chargers and Miami Dolphins to Sun Devil Stadium in Tempe, Arizona. The decision to move the game to Arizona was made less than 24 hours before the game started, and admission was free.

== Investigation ==
Investigators determined that the fire was started by Sergio Martinez of West Covina, California, a novice hunter who was unprepared for the local back country and had become disorientated after venturing into "thick and tall" brush. Martinez initially told investigators that he had fired a shot from his rifle to draw attention and that "sparks" from the shot had caused the fire.

After gathering branches and other flammable brush together, Martinez intentionally lit a large fire that he quickly lost control of, spreading to the surrounding Chaparral brush. The daily high temperature combined with low humidity & low moisture content of the highly flammable chaparral were ideal for a wildfire. At 8 p.m. local time the predicted evening Santa Ana winds blew hot and dry desert air from the east westward though the rugged terrain fanning the intense flames westward towards the residential areas of San Diego.

Two local Sheriff deputies searched for Martinez in a helicopter. They found him disoriented and confused, but he apologized for starting the fire while being transported in the helicopter.

Martinez was charged in federal court on October 7, 2004 with setting the wildfire and lying about its cause to investigators. In November 2005, as part of a plea deal a federal judge sentenced Martinez to six months in a work-furlough program and ordered him to complete 960 hours (40 days) of community service. He also was sentenced to five years' probation and to pay $9,000 in restitution. As part of the plea bargain, prosecutors dropped the charge of lying to investigators.

== Criticism of the response ==
=== Outdated policies ===
There were a number of controversies associated with the Cedar Fire, resulting in investigations lasting several years. A report, the 2003 San Diego County Fire Siege Fire Safety Review, prepared in the wake of the fire and presented to the Governor's Blue Ribbon Fire Commission, criticized the overall response. The report stated that though the fire conditions and severity should have been expected, the responsible agencies were not properly prepared when the fire broke out, and radio communications problems exacerbated the problem. The report stated that "Disorganization, inconsistent or outdated policies among agencies that grounded aircraft or caused other problems, and planning or logistics in disarray also marked the preliminary stages of the difficult, dangerous firefighting." With multiple fires already burning in the state, many local crews were already headed north to fight other fires and could not be recalled to assist with the Cedar Fire.

=== Forest Service issues ===
The turning away of the Sheriff's helicopters by the U.S. Forest Service in the fire's early stages came under severe criticism by the public, media and elected officials, believing that an opportunity to prevent the fire from becoming out of control had been lost. The federal government has an aviation assets "cutoff" policy which stated that "aircraft (planes or helicopters) may not be dispatched so as to arrive at an incident no later than 30 minutes before sunset". The helicopter pilot later claimed he could have made multiple water drops in the time he had before darkness. However, a study conducted by the Forest Service concluded that even if the helicopter had been able to drop multiple loads of water with direct hits on the flames, the impact on the fire would have been minimal.

Cutoff also prevented two air tankers and a helicopter stationed at Ramona Airport from being dispatched to the fire, although the tankers likely could not have been used anyway as the pilots had just spent seven hours fighting another fire, and FAA regulations stipulated that they could not continue to fly.

=== California Department of Forestry issues ===
A contributing factor to the initial lack of aviation resources to fight the fire was the California Department of Forestry's "no divert" policy, which allows incident commanders to dedicate certain resources to a particular fire; the policy applied to both airborne aircraft as well as those on the ground awaiting dispatch. At the time that the Cedar Fire started, there were already 11 other fires burning in the region. Aviation resources in the area were currently being held on the ground under a "no divert" declaration, in order to be available for structures' protection on another fire. However, weather and visibility at the other fire was precluding their use, so the aircraft sat idle, despite the fact that conditions were acceptable for their use on the Cedar Fire.

Both the media and local elected officials were also critical of the lack of use of military aviation assets located nearby at Camp Pendleton and Miramar. The U.S. Marine Corps operates CH-46 Sea Knight and CH-53 Sea Stallion helicopters that can carry water-dropping buckets, but existing policies prohibited their use until all other civilian resources were used. Additionally, the military aircraft radios were not compatible with those used by most state and local fire agencies, and the military pilots had not received any training in fire-specific operations, making them a potential safety hazard both to firefighters on the ground and other aircraft over the fire.

== Fatalities ==
Fifteen people, including one firefighter, were killed by the fire. A survivor, Rudy Reyes, was burned over approximately 70% of his body. Many of those killed were trapped by the flames which were driven by 60-mile-per-hour (97 km/h) winds outpaced fleeing residents. Of those killed, 13 died in the first 24 hours of the fire. At least 10 people were trapped in their vehicles trying to outrun the flames, some of whom were disfigured to the point that identification was made based on their deceased dog's collars. On October 29, fire overran an engine crew from the Novato Fire District near the town of Julian, killing engineer Steven Rucker. The three other crewmembers sheltered in a house.

== See also ==
- Santiago Canyon Fire
- 1991 Oakland firestorm
- 2003 California wildfires
  - Old Fire
- October 2007 California wildfires
  - Witch Fire
- 2008 California wildfires
- May 2014 San Diego County wildfires
- October 2017 Northern California wildfires
  - Tubbs Fire
- December 2017 Southern California wildfires
  - Thomas Fire
  - Lilac Fire
