= Cuyamaca Rancho State Park =

State park in California, United States

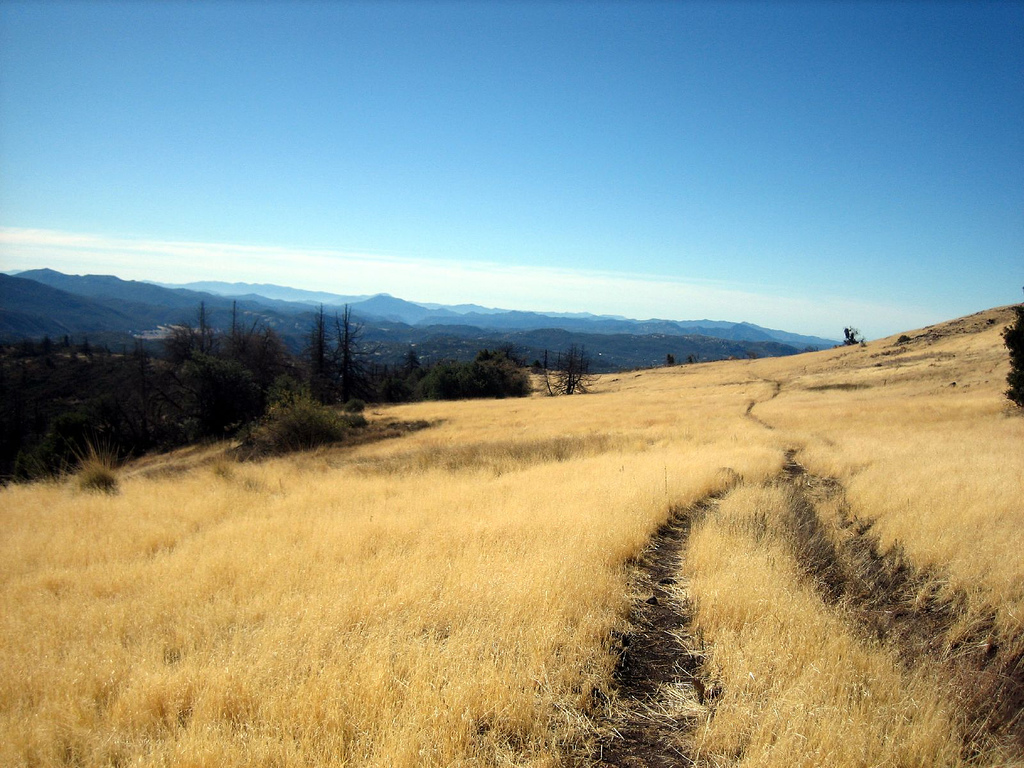
- The West Mesa Trail in Cuyamaca Rancho State Park

- Location within California Location within the United States
- Location: San Diego County, California, United States
- Nearest city: San Diego, California
- Coordinates: 32°56′N 116°34′W
- Area: 24,693 acres (99.93 km^{2})
- Established: 1933
- Governing body: California Department of Parks and Recreation

Cuyamaca Rancho State Park is a state park in inland San Diego County, California, United States, located 40 miles (64 km) east of the metropolitan area of San Diego. The park is situated near the southernmost reaches of the Cleveland National Forest, as well as the Cuyamaca and Laguna Mountains of the Peninsular Ranges. The park's 26,000 acres (11,000 ha) of land features pine, fir, and oak forests, interspersed with meadows, creeks and streams that exist due to the relatively high elevation of the area when compared to its surroundings. The park includes the 6,512-foot (1,985 m) Cuyamaca Peak, the second-highest point in San Diego County.

Park amenities include trails for hiking, horseback riding, and mountain biking, as well as campgrounds for family, group, equestrian, and primitive trail camping; and an exhibit at a former gold mine, the Stonewall Mine. For fauna, nearly 20–25 mammalian species call the park home, in addition to over 140 species of resident and migratory birds, sixteen species of reptile, five amphibian species, three fish species and over 700 species of various arthropods, butterflies, spiders and other invertebrates have been found to inhabit the park.

The park was closed for several months due to massive fire damage incurred during the 2003 Cedar Fire. Although much of the forest was burned, the park has since been reopened. Native plants are, mostly, evolutionarily attuned to seasonal drought and fire ecology, and have since re-established in most areas; the large amount of ash, blackened wood and burnt plant matter greatly stimulates dormant seeds and undamaged saplings to sprout vigorously, as well as triggering a flush of growth from various bulbs and rhizomes lying hidden beneath the surface of the ground.

== Geology ==
Cuyamaca Rancho State Park is located in the Peninsular Range, which extends from the San Jacinto Mountains north of the park, southward to the tip of Baja California. At the western edge of the most seismically active area in North America, the range is a great uplifted plateau, cut off from the Colorado Desert to the east by the Elsinore Fault Zone, where vertical movement over the last two million years has amounted to thousands of feet of tectonic uplift.

Metamorphosed sediments such as schist, gneiss, and quartzite are abundant in the Cuyamacas, particularly in the Stonewall Mine area. Most of the rocks now seen in the park are plutonic: either the granodiorite comprising Stonewall Peak, or the gabbro comprising Cuyamaca Peak. As these bedrocks weather, they become the parent material of the coarse, acidic, red soil found throughout the area. Gabbro weathers to a darker red soil than granodiorite or other quartz-rich rock.

Gold is a natural element that appears around granite formations because gold forms during cooling and solidification of igneous rock. Gold commonly occurs in association with quartz, either as pure gold or as an ore. In the Cuyamaca area, gold is associated with the metasediment called Julian Schist. At mines in this area, including the Stonewall, veins of gold were followed into the bedrock and the surrounding ore was excavated. Most streams in the park have small amounts of gold, since it is constantly being removed from the quartz exposures by weathering.

== Flora ==
=== Trees ===
Cuyamaca's average elevation of nearly 5,000 feet (1,500 m) enables many conifers and broadleaf trees to exist; a rarity in xeric Southern California. The conifers include the white fir, incense cedar, Coulter pine, Jeffrey pine, sugar pine and ponderosa pine. The broadleaves include the white alder, Arizona ash, California sycamore, Fremont cottonwood, coast live oak, canyon live oak, Engelmann oak, California black oak, interior live oak, oracle oak, and red willow.

=== Shrubs ===
Large shrubs, those ranging from 4–15 feet (1.2–4.6 m), include chamise, Eastwood manzanita, Cuyamaca manzanita, Mexican manzanita, cupleaf mountain lilac, whitebark mountain lilac, Palmer mountain lilac, mountain mahogany, creek dogwood, Parish goldenbush, yerba santa, Parish burning bush, toyon, California barberry, laurel sumac, hollyleaf cherry, western chokecherry, scrub oak, coffeeberry, western azalea, white sage, and elderberry.

The park's smaller shrubs, ranging from 1–4 feet (0.30–1.22 m), include California buckwheat, Wright's buckwheat, chaparral honeysuckle, California rose, creeping sage, snowberry, and poison oak.

=== Wildflowers ===
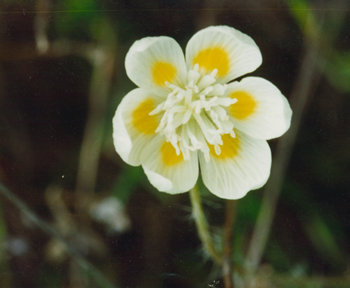
creamcups (Platystemon californica)

Early Season	Middle Season	Late Season
milkmaids (Cardamine californica)	purple nightshade (Solanum xanti)	penstemon (Penstemon spp.)
California peony (Paeonia californica)	monkeyflower (Mimulus spp.)	locoweed (Astragalus spp.)
goldfields (Lasthenia spp.)	mule's ears (Wyethia helenioides)	cudweed (Pseudognaphalium californicum)
creamcups (Platystemon californica)	milkweed (Asclepias spp.)	thistle (Cirsium occidentale)
checkerbloom (Sidalcea spp.)	wallflower (Erysimum spp.)	Indian paintbrush (Castilleja spp.)
splendid Mariposa lily (Calochortus splendens)	golden bowl Mariposa lily (Calochortus concolor)	California fuchsia (Epilobium canum)
tidytips (Layia spp.)	virgin's bower (Clematis lasiantha	goldenrod (Solidago spp.)
golden yarrow (Eriophyllum confertiflorum)	yarrow (Achillea millefolium)	
columbine (Aquilegia spp.)	Humboldt's lily (Lilium humboldtii ssp. ocellatum)	
baby blue eyes (Nemophila menziesii)
purple lupine (Lupinus polyphyllus)
goldenstars (Bloomeria crocea)

== Fauna ==
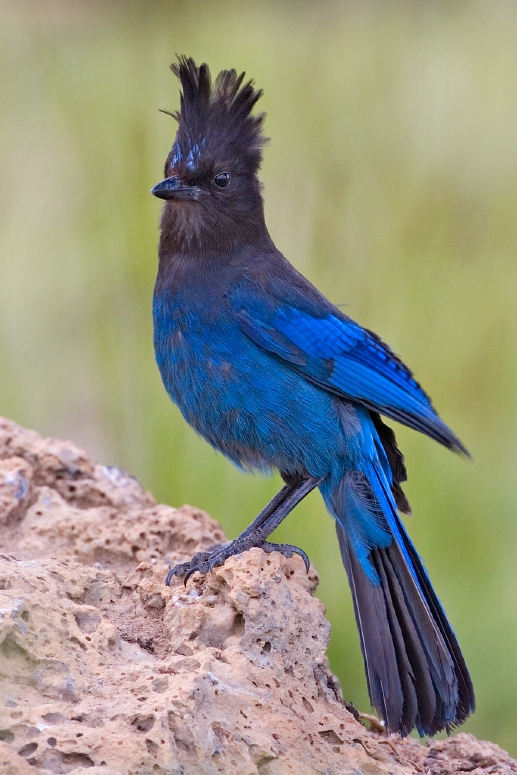
Steller's jay

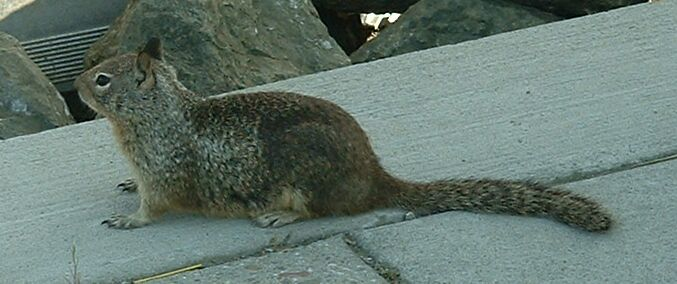
California ground squirrel

Over 20 mammal species have been observed in Cuyamaca Rancho State Park, including:

- Black-tailed jackrabbit (Lepus californicus)
- Bobcat (Lynx rufus)
- Botta's pocket gopher (Thomomys bottae)
- Broad-footed mole (Scapanus latimanus)
- California brush rabbit (Sylvilagus bachmani)
- California ground squirrel (Otospermophilis beachyi)
- California vole (Microtus californicus)
- Coyote (Canis latrans)
- Deer mouse (Peromyscus sp.)
- Desert cottontail (Sylvilagus audubonii)
- Desert pocket mouse (Chaetodipus sp.)
- Dulzura kangaroo rat (Dipodomys simulans)
- Dusky-footed woodrat (Neotoma fuscipes)
- Gray fox (Urocyon cinereoargenteus)
- Merriam's chipmunk (Tamias merriami)
- Mountain lion (Felis concolor)
- Southern mule deer (Odocoileus hemionus fulgilinatus)
- Raccoon (Procyon lotor)
- Ringtail (Bassariscus astutus)
- Spotted skunk (western) (Spilogale gracilis)
- Striped skunk (Mephitis mephitis)
- Virginia opossum (Didelphis virginiana)
- Western gray squirrel (Sciurus griseus)

Nearly 200 species of birds have been documented, with some of the most common species being the wild turkey, acorn woodpecker, Nuttall's woodpecker, northern flicker, Steller's jay, western bluebird, white-breasted nuthatch, mountain chickadee, oak titmouse, American robin, red-tailed hawk, and red-shouldered hawk. Migrants, transients and summer residents include the ash-throated flycatcher, Baltimore oriole, black-headed grosbeak, house wren, lesser goldfinch, several warblers, and the western wood pewee.

Resident amphibians and reptiles include the canyon tree frog, Pacific tree frog, red-legged frog, western toad, common king snake, gopher snake, California mountain kingsnake, racer, striped racer, and western garter snake.

=== Cougar incidents ===
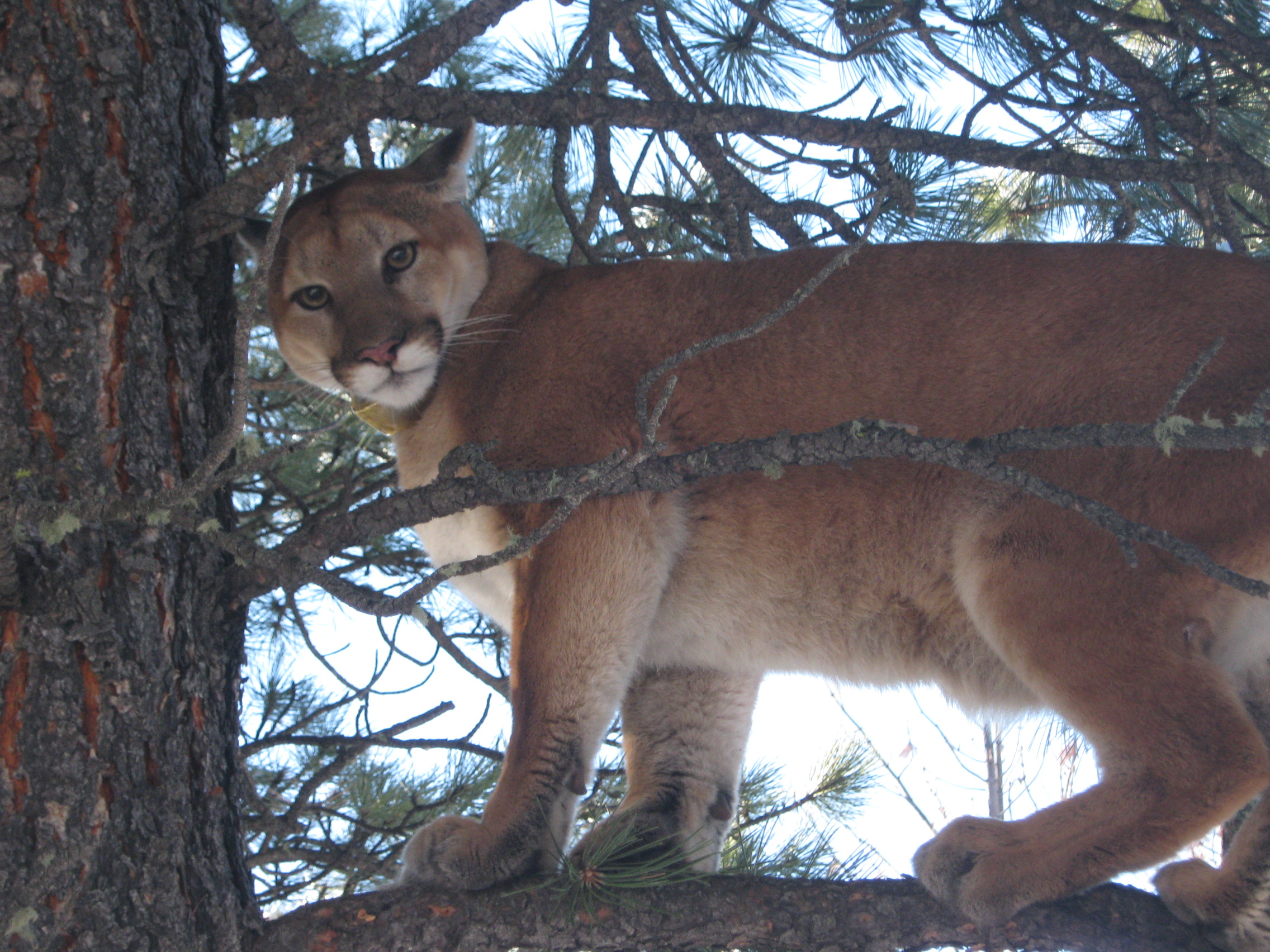

Generally cougars are quite elusive, but for a ten-year span Cuyamaca Rancho State Park experienced a rash of incidents between visitors and cougars, including one human fatality. Park users are warned not to hike, run, horseback ride or bike alone.

Cuyamaca Rancho's first reported cougar incident took place in June 1988. A European couple with a small child was chased by two cougars in the park's Green Valley Campground. A game warden investigated and killed the two male cats. In September 1993 a cougar chased two horseback riders for .5 miles (0.80 km), prompting park officials to close Cuyamaca Rancho for two weeks and install gated barriers around the campgrounds and parking areas. 11 days after the park reopened, however, a different cougar nipped a girl playing with her family in the campground and fought with their dog. The 41-pound (19 kg) juvenile female cat was located and shot.

1994 saw two separate incidents in which a cougar acted aggressively toward a party of three humans; officials located and shot both animals. Then in December 56-year-old Iris Kenna was killed during an early morning solo hike by a 130-pound (59 kg) male cougar, which was located and destroyed that night.

A cub acting aggressively toward a woman on horseback was reported and killed in 1996. In 1998 a pair of hikers were menaced for 15 minutes before driving the cat off with pepper spray. Two other aggressive cougar incidents were reported that year, both in the park's horse camp.

Fatal cougar attacks are extraordinarily rare. In all of California since 1890 there have been 16 verified attacks on humans, only six leading to fatalities. Leading cougar attack website CougarInfo.org has not listed any incidents at Cuyamaca Rancho since 1998.

== Park history ==
Historical features in Cuyamaca Rancho State Park date from prehistoric humans through the Southern California Gold Rush.

=== Native Americans ===
Indigenous peoples in the area date back a minimum of 7000 years. Traces of their ancient and pre-contact civilizations are within the park, which is a Cuyamaca complex archeological site. Early bedrock mortars mark the sites of summer camps and villages. Even the name "Cuyamaca" is a Spanish version of the name the native Kumeyaay peoples used for this place. In water-short Southern California, the Native Americans called the area Ah-Ha Kwe-Ah Mac, meaning "the place where it rains".

Kumeyaay peoples' traditional lands range from San Diego east through the Cuyamaca and the Laguna Mountains through present-day Anza-Borrego Desert State Park to beyond the Salton Sea in the east, and south beyond present day Ensenada, Baja California, on the Baja California peninsula in Mexico. A typical band's typical range was a 20-mile (30 km) radius from their winter home. Today twelve federally recognized Kumeyaay tribes are in San Diego County.

=== 19th century ===
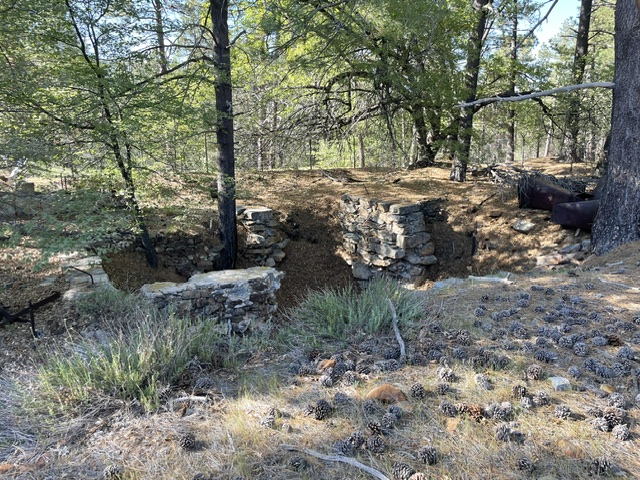
Entrance to the collapsed Stonewall Mine

The park is located on the 1845 Rancho Cuyamaca Mexican land grant. With the discovery of gold in Julian in 1869, the Spanish, Mexican, and American governments and settlers changed the Kumeyaay's way of life forever. Disease spread through the Kumeyaay, traditional ways of life were destroyed, and promises broken as the Indians were expelled in 1875 from ancestral lands and taxed without representation. Currently there are about 20,000 Kumeyaay descendants in San Diego County, 10% of whom live on the 18 reservations which range from 6.3 to 122,000 acres (0.025 to 490 km^{2}).

The Stonewall Mine opened in 1870 and started the boomtown of Cuyamaca City. Peak production at the mine occurred between 1886 and 1891 while employing over 200 workers. In 1889 Cuyamaca Dam was completed and in 1892 Stonewall Mine was permanently sealed after large losses.

=== 20th century ===
In 1923 Ralph Dyar bought the Cuyamaca Rancho and built a summer home. In 1933 he sold his property to the state, thereby creating Cuyamaca Rancho State Park. Now the park is over 26,000 acres (105 km^{2}) of protected wildlife habitat, watershed, archeological sites, botanical reserve, and recreational land with roughly half of the park classified as wilderness area.

== Cuyamaca Rancho State Park Interpretive Association ==
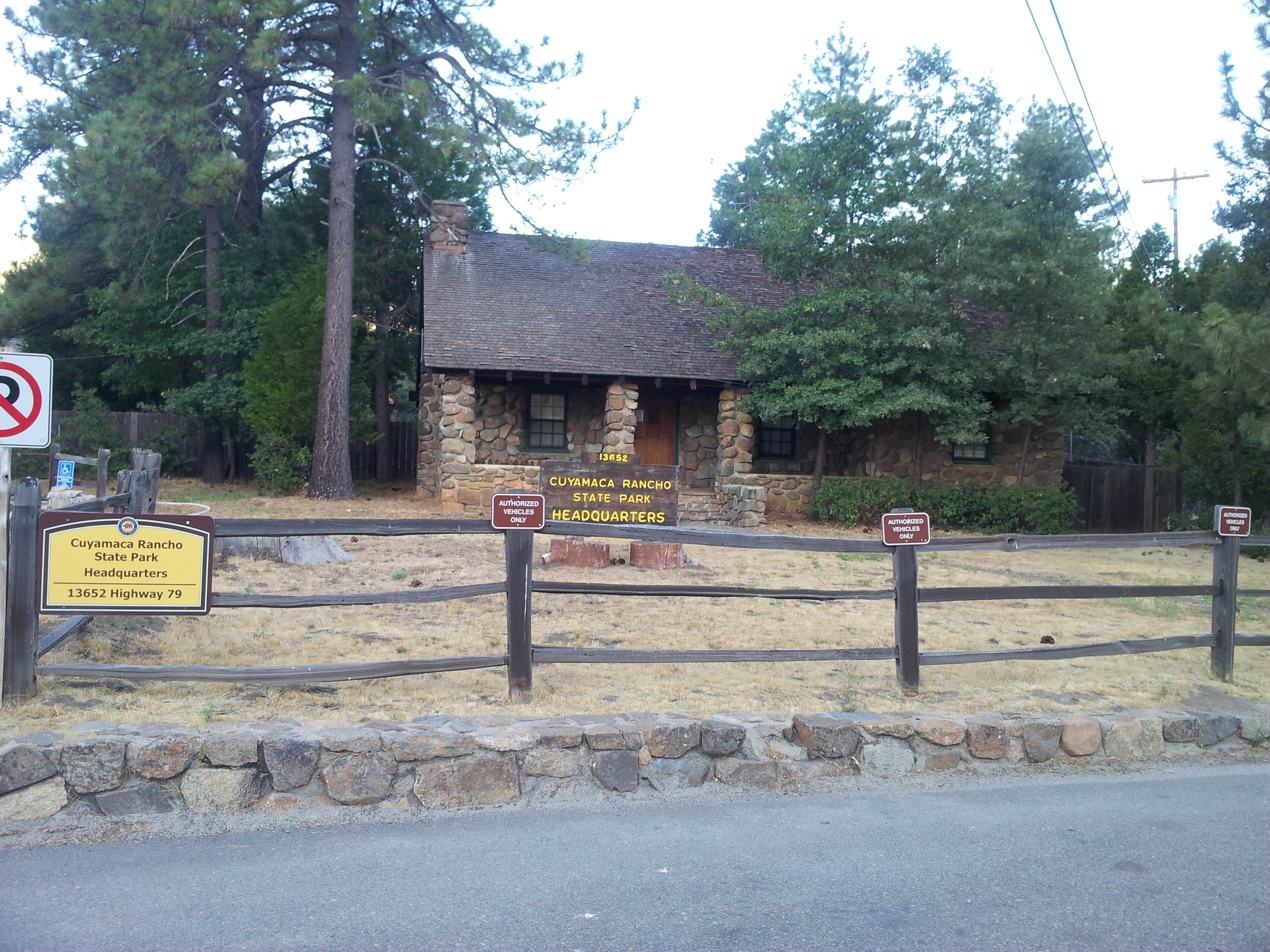
Front view of the park

The Cuyamaca Rancho State Park Interpretive Association (CRSPIA) supports the mission of Cuyamaca Rancho and Palomar Mountain State Parks through education and interpretive activities that enhance the visitor's experience. CRSPIA accomplishes its goals principally through fundraising and supporting interpretive programs. Support is also provided for the parks' volunteer groups, which include the Interpretive Assistance Unit, the Mounted Assistance Unit, the Mountain Bike Assistance Unit, and the Trails Maintenance Unit.

Historically CRSPIA has passed along to park programs more than 95% of all funds received from the public. Sources of funds include profits from the operation of a gift shop and bookstore, sale of firewood, membership dues, and various fundraising events. Over the last decade, revenues have grown steadily to the current level of approximately $40,000 per year. Members receive a monthly newspaper, The Stonewall Sentinel.

The extensive Cedar Fire of October 2003 in Cuyamaca Rancho State Park destroyed the park's museum, CRSPIA's gift shop, and bookstore along with the entire inventory. However a temporary facility has been constructed to house operations and provides these services once again to park visitors.

== See also ==
- Cuyamaca Outdoor School
- List of California native plants
- List of California state parks
