= Fortuna Mountain =

Mountain in California, United States

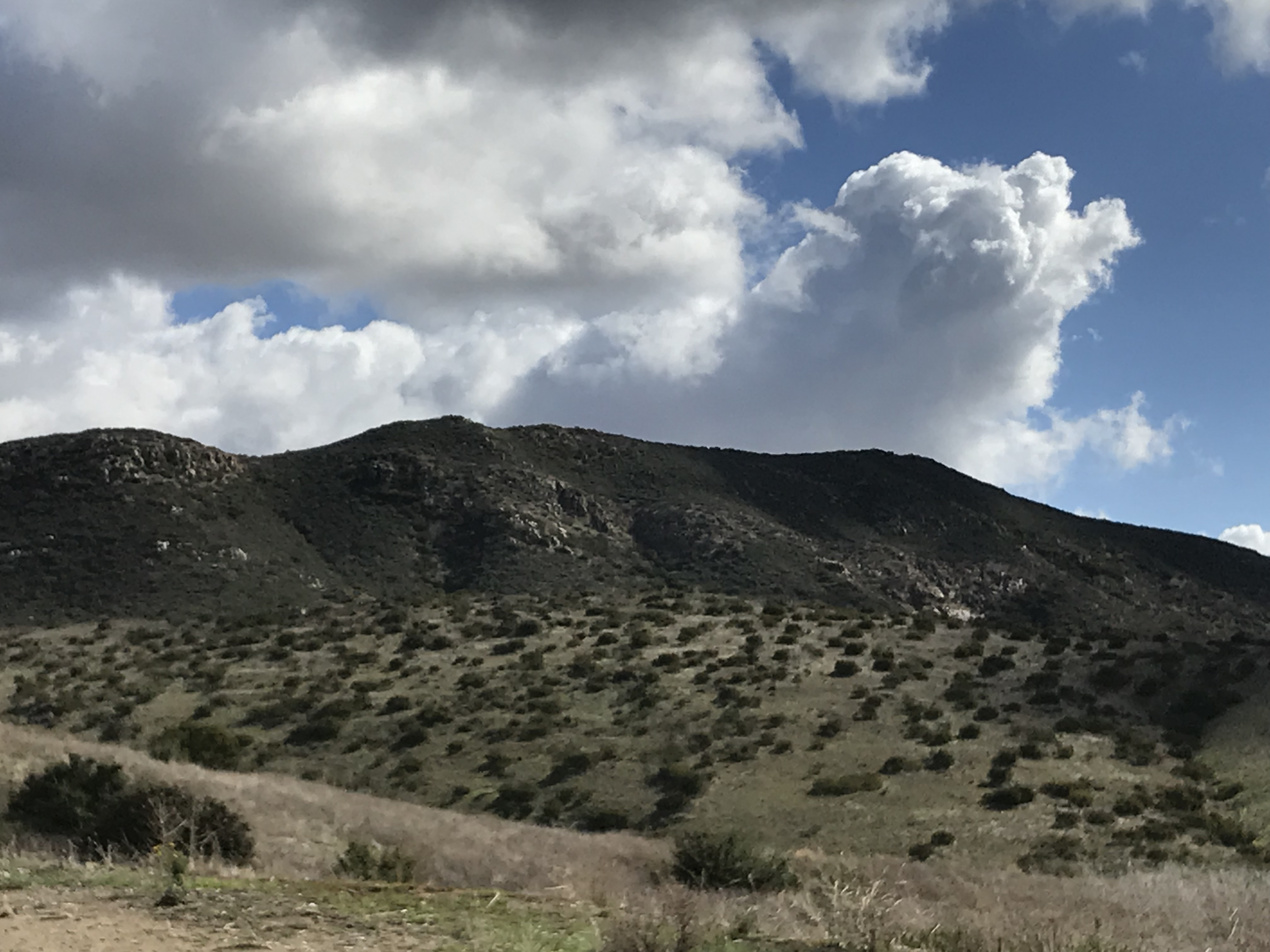
- North Fortuna Mountain viewed from California State Route 52.

Highest point
- Elevation: 1,293 ft (394 m) NAVD 88
- Prominence: 411 ft (125 m)
- Listing: San Diego Peak list
- Coordinates: 32°50′49″N 117°03′39″W

Geography
- Location: San Diego County, California.
- Topo map: USGS La Mesa

Climbing
- Easiest route: Trail class 1

Fortuna Mountain, also known as North Fortuna Mountain, is a 1,293-foot (394 m) mountain located in Mission Trails Regional Park in San Diego, California. The mountain is the northernmost of the five peaks that dominate the center of Mission Trails Regional Park. Due to the surrounding lower mesa topography, Fortuna is easily visible to those traveling on nearby Interstate 15 through Marine Corps Air Station Miramar and those on State Route 52 over the Mission Trails Summit between San Diego and Santee, California.

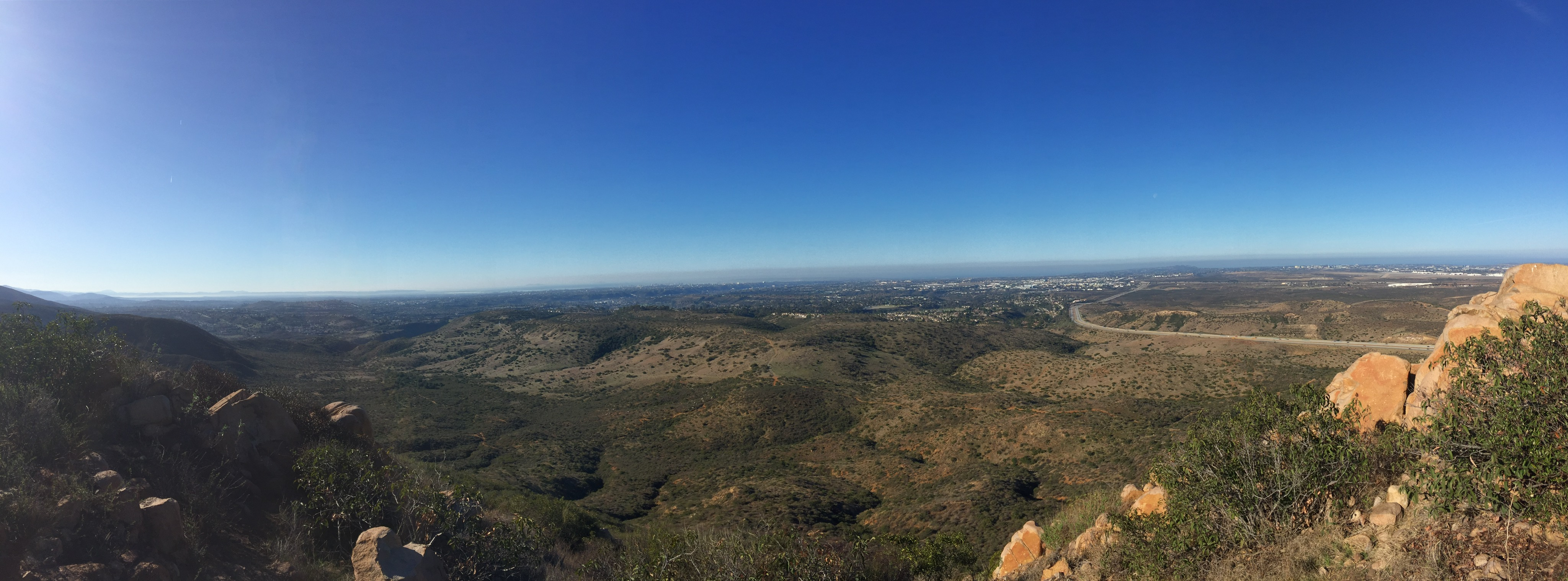
Panorama from the Summit looking west toward Point Loma

== Hiking ==
There are several routes to the summit of North Fortuna Mountain. More popular routes being those that leave from the area around Old Mission Dam and proceed up the saddle between North Fortuna and its smaller neighbor South Fortuna before turning to the north up the summit ridge to the North Fortuna Summit. The summit affords those that make it to the top 360-degree views of San Diego, Santee, MCAS Miramar as well as other landmarks such as Cowles Mountain to the immediate south and the Cuyamaca Peak and the Cuyamaca Mountains to the east.
