= Lee Passmore =

American Photographer & Field Naturalist

- Born: January 9, 1874; Ridgetown, Ontario, Canada
- Died: December 12, 1958 (aged 84); San Diego, California, United States
- Other name: Levi Nickerson Passmore
- Known for: Nature photography

Notes
- Assoc: San Diego Natural History Museum

Lee Passmore (January 9, 1874 – December 12, 1958) was an American photographer and field naturalist who worked with scientists and staff at the San Diego Natural History Museum documenting the flora and fauna of Southern California. Passmore published photo essays on natural history subjects in popular magazines from the 1920s to the 1940s, and contributed photographs to several natural history monographs. He donated his extensive collection of photographic negatives, glass slides, and Kodachrome transparencies to the San Diego Natural History Museum in 1958; these include significant collections of images on the natural history of the trapdoor spider, the carpenter bee, and the tomato sphinx moth.

Passmore also photographed life in early 20th-century San Diego; subjects include the 1915 Panama–California Exposition in Balboa Park, Old Town San Diego, Old Mission Dam, Sunset Cliffs, the tuna industry, and boats the San Diego harbor. The San Diego Historical Society holds a large number of Passmore's photographs of San Diego subjects (c. 1905–1935).

== Biography ==
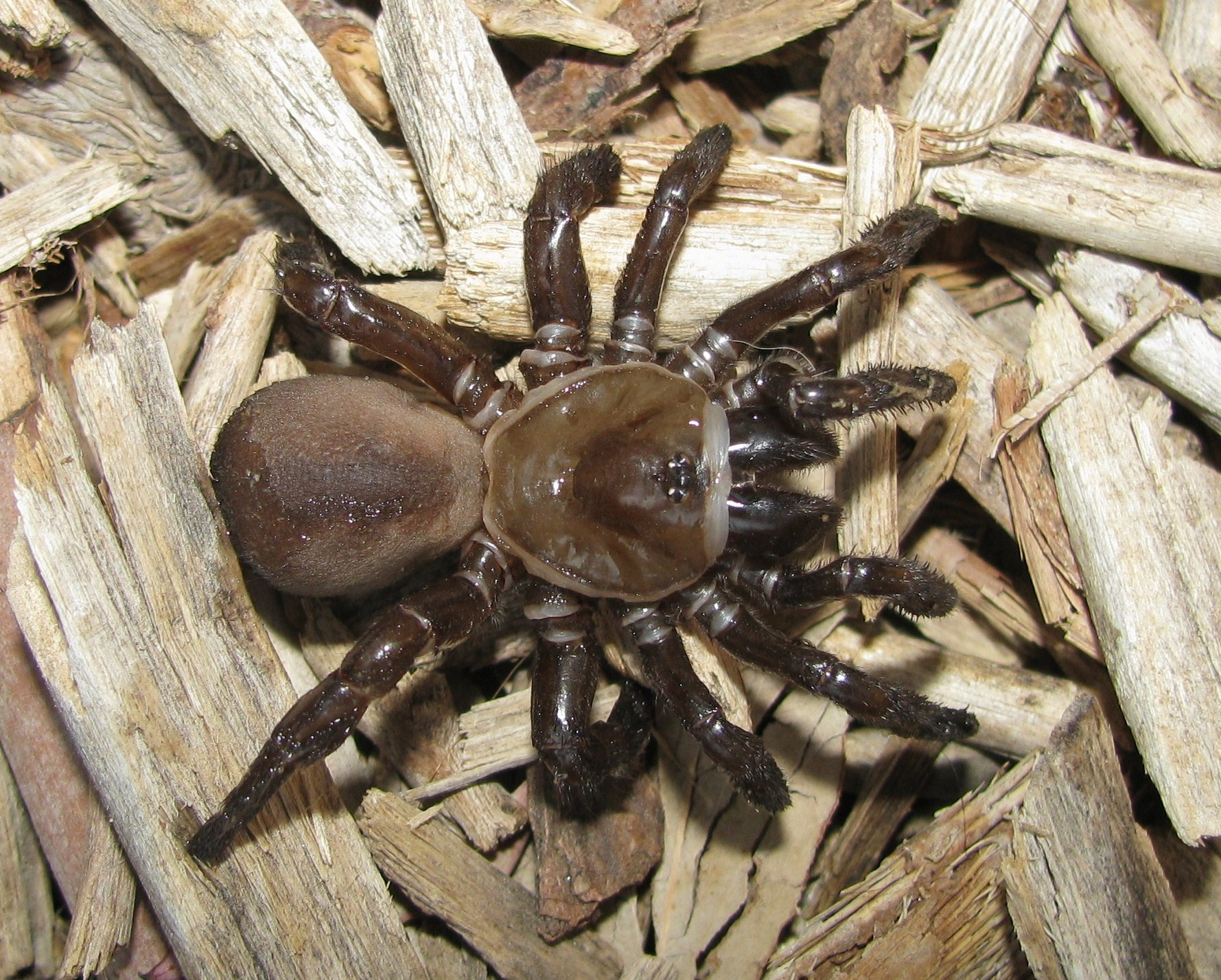
Bothriocyrtum californicum (California trapdoor spider), dorsal view

Born Levi Nickerson Passmore (1874) in Ridgetown, Ontario, Canada to American-born father William H. Passmore and Canadian mother Sarah Ann Smith, Passmore was raised in Canada. He married Georgia Preston in 1899; they had a daughter and two sons. Widowed between 1902 and 1910, Passmore emigrated to the United States and opened a photography studio in San Diego in 1908. He married Lida Wickey in 1914.

== Photography ==
Passmore specialized in marine scenes from 1908 to 1912, producing a record of the transport of logs by Benson rafts. Passmore worked as a barker and guide for the Star & Crescent Boat Company's harbor excursions, and produced photographs of San Diego locations for the Union-Title Insurance & Trust Company.

In 1914, Passmore discovered flume tiles at Old Mission Dam (in what is now Mission Trails Regional Park). His photographs provide a record of the method used to transport water from the dam to the mission in the early 1800s. From the 1930s, Passmore focused his interest on field photography of natural history subjects, particularly insects and spiders. He was a charter member of the San Diego Natural History Museum and an early member of the San Diego Zoological Society.

Passmore died on December 12, 1958, in San Diego, California.

== Selected bibliography ==
- Dunn, H.H.; Passmore, Lee (October 1929). "Winged kings of a bird empire". Popular Mechanics: 626–629.
- Passmore, Lee (August 1933). "California trapdoor spider performs engineering marvels". National Geographic. LXIV (2): 195.
- Passmore, Lee (1935). Grosvenor, Gilbert (ed.). "California trapdoor spider," Our insect friends and foes and spiders. Washington, D.C.: National Geographic Society.
- Passmore, Lee (1936). "Tarantula and tarantula hawk". Nature. 27: 155–159.
- Passmore, Lee (October 1938). "Jumping spiders". Popular Science: [102–103].
- Passmore, Lee (1939). "The tarantula molts". Nature. 32: 151–152.
- Emans, Elaine V.; Young, Viola A.; Passmore, Lee; Kuehn, O.C. (1940). About spiders : introducing Arachne. New York: E.P. Dutton & Co.
- Passmore, Lee (April 29, 1946). "Insect battles – Microphotographs show how spiders kill flies and wasps kill spiders". Life. pp. 79–82.
- Passmore, Lee. "A picture story of the mud-dauber wasp". Lee Passmore, Photographer & Naturalist. n.d.
- Passmore, Lee. "The black widow spider". Lee Passmore, Photographer & Naturalist. n.d.
- Passmore, Lee; Beck, F.E. "The life of a trap-door spider". Lee Passmore, Photographer & Naturalist. n.d.

== See also ==
- Boone, Andrew R. (March 1937). "Photographer of Insects Records Life Dramas of Strange Creatures". Popular Science Monthly: 36–37, 125–125.
- "Daring Cameraman Snaps Animals on Desolate Isle". Popular Science Monthly: 48. May 1931.
