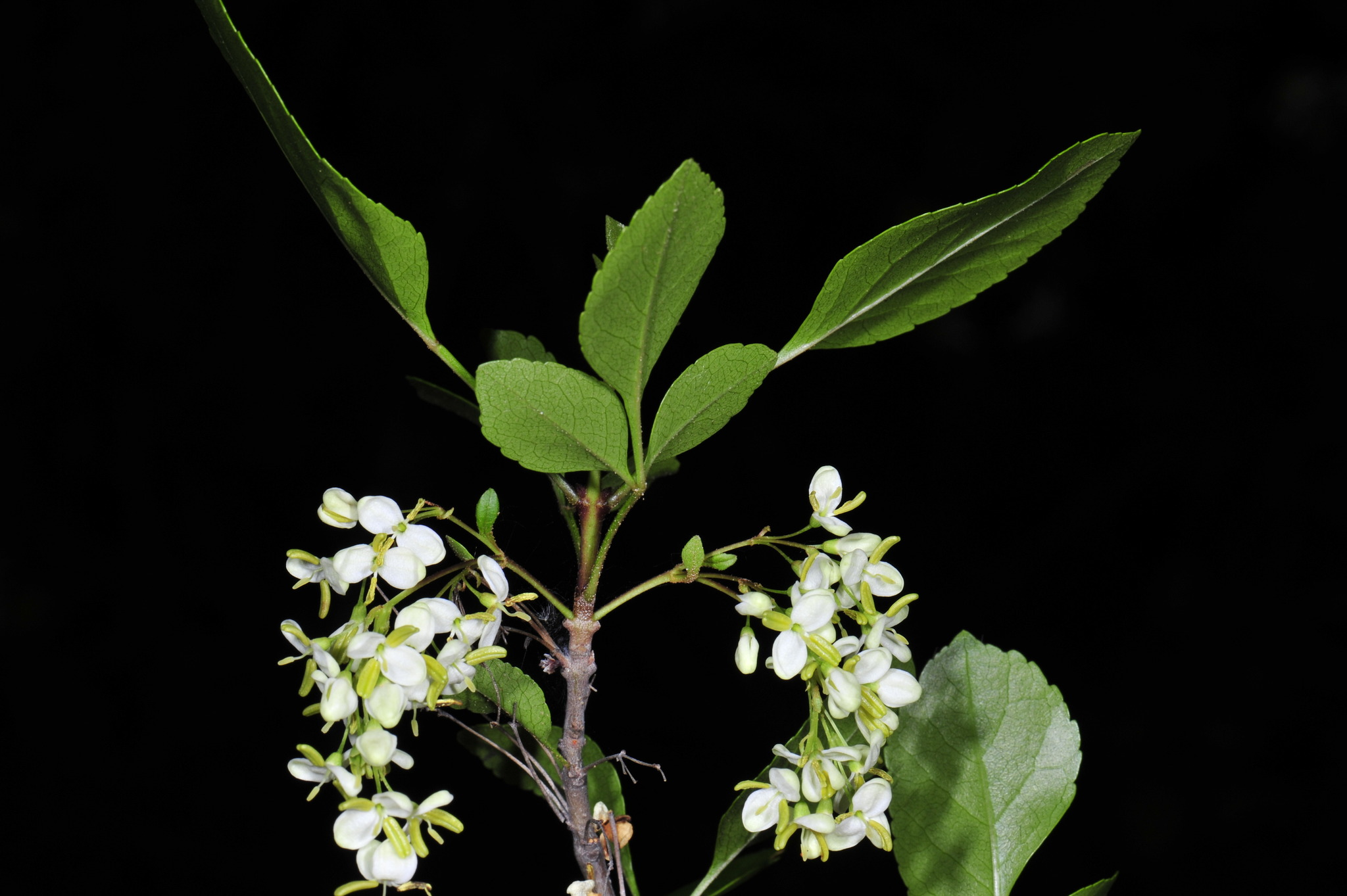

Conservation status
- Vulnerable (NatureServe)

Scientific classification
- Kingdom: Plantae
- Clade: Tracheophytes
- Clade: Angiosperms
- Clade: Eudicots
- Clade: Asterids
- Order: Lamiales
- Family: Oleaceae
- Genus: Fraxinus
- Species: F. parryi

Binomial name
- Fraxinus parryi Moran, 2001

= Fraxinus parryi =

Species of tree

Fraxinus parryi, known by common names chaparral ash, crucecilla, and fresnillo, is a species of ash native to southwestern North America, growing as a shrub or a small tree.

== Description ==
Generally growing as a shrub to a tree, the plant has smooth, gray bark. The twigs are cylindric to 4-angled. The buds are glandular-puberulent. The plant bears simple or compound glabrous leaves with 1 to 3 unequal leaflets, with this unevenness especially pronounced in the terminal leaflet, which are shaped attenuate-petiolate. It bears flowers with two petals that are 4.5 to 6.5 mm long. The flowers are bisexual, cream-white. The fruits are 2.2 to 3 cm long, 7 to 9 mm wide, with a body broadly oblong to oblanceolate, flat, and broadly winged to near the base.

== Taxonomy ==
=== Classification ===
The chaparral ash was first described by Reid Moran in a 2001 publication of Aliso. It was described as a consequence over confusion about the species of ash common to northwestern Baja California.

Initially, the ash species native to northwestern B.C. was described as Fraxinus dipetala var. trifoliolata, by John Torrey. Torrey himself was uncertain if this represented a distinct species or an extreme form of F. dipetala, as he was working off of a specimen collected in 1850 by Charles C. Parry.

George B. Sudworth (1908) and Paul C. Standley (1924) both listed the shrub as F. dipetala trifoliolata, whilst Elbert L. Little (1953) considered it variety trifoliolata, and E. Murray (1985) made it subspecies trifoliolata. Gertrude N. Miller (1955) and Little (1979) later called it a synonym of F. dipetala. Edward A. Goldman (1916) misidentified it as Fraxinus attenuata.

Harlan Lewis and Carl Epling noted the significant morphological differences between F. dipetala and this plant, with Ira L. Wiggins (1964 and 1980) also treating this ash as its own species. However, Lewis and Epling, along with those who regarded this ash as a new species, like Wiggins, described it as F. trifoliata, a misspelling of trifoliolata. This, in turn, would make it F. trifoliolata, which is a homonym of an already existing species of Chinese ash, F. trifoliolata W. W. Smith (1916), native to Sichuan and Yunnan provinces in China.

In response to the confusion over the taxonomic classification of the ash, Moran described it as Fraxinus parryi, in honor of the collector C. C. Parry.

The classification of Fraxinus by Eva Wallander in 2008 regards this species as a synonym of F. dipetala, the California ash. However, the Jepson treatment and regional sources like the San Diego Natural History Museum consider F. parryi to have enough qualifying morphological characteristics to be a separate species, noting that more molecular work will be needed to differentiate the two.

== Distribution and habitat ==
Native to southwestern North America, the chaparral ash is predominantly extant in northwestern Baja California, with a small population north of the border in the United States. In Baja California, it grows on the western side of the peninsula, from the border to the southern end of the Sierra San Pedro Martir. It extends far south enough that it grows with some desert flora, like the Boojum tree, Fouquieria columnaris, and the cardon, Pachycereus pringlei. In the north, it shares habitat with redshanks, Adenostoma sparsifolium, and the California juniper, Juniperus californica. The species' northern extent is in southern San Diego County, in Lyons Valley and Lawson Valley, where it is rare and threatened, with the California Native Plant Society designating it with a California Rare Plant Rank of 2B.2 (rare, threatened, or endangered in CA; common elsewhere).

== Gallery ==
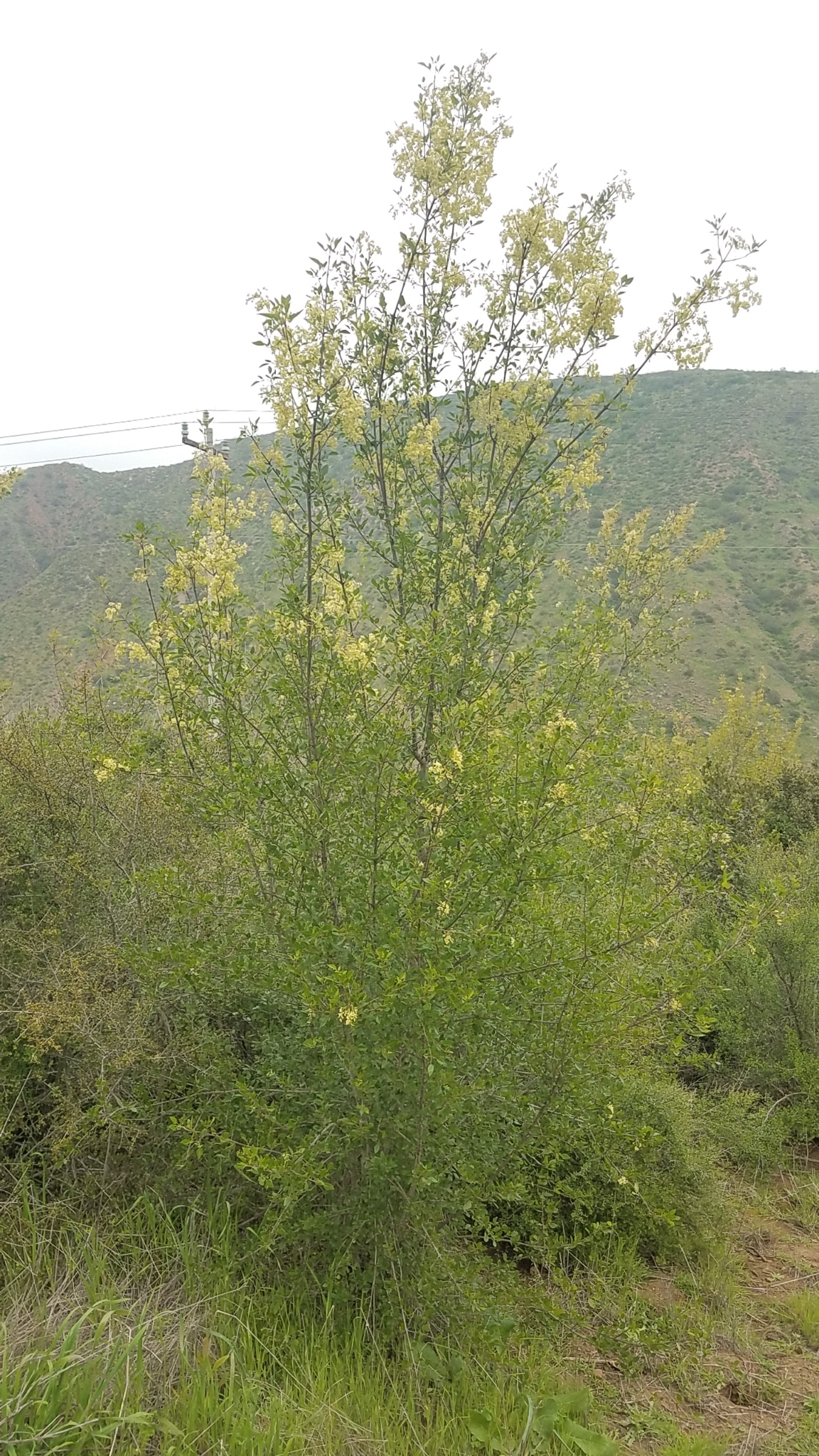
Plant in habitat

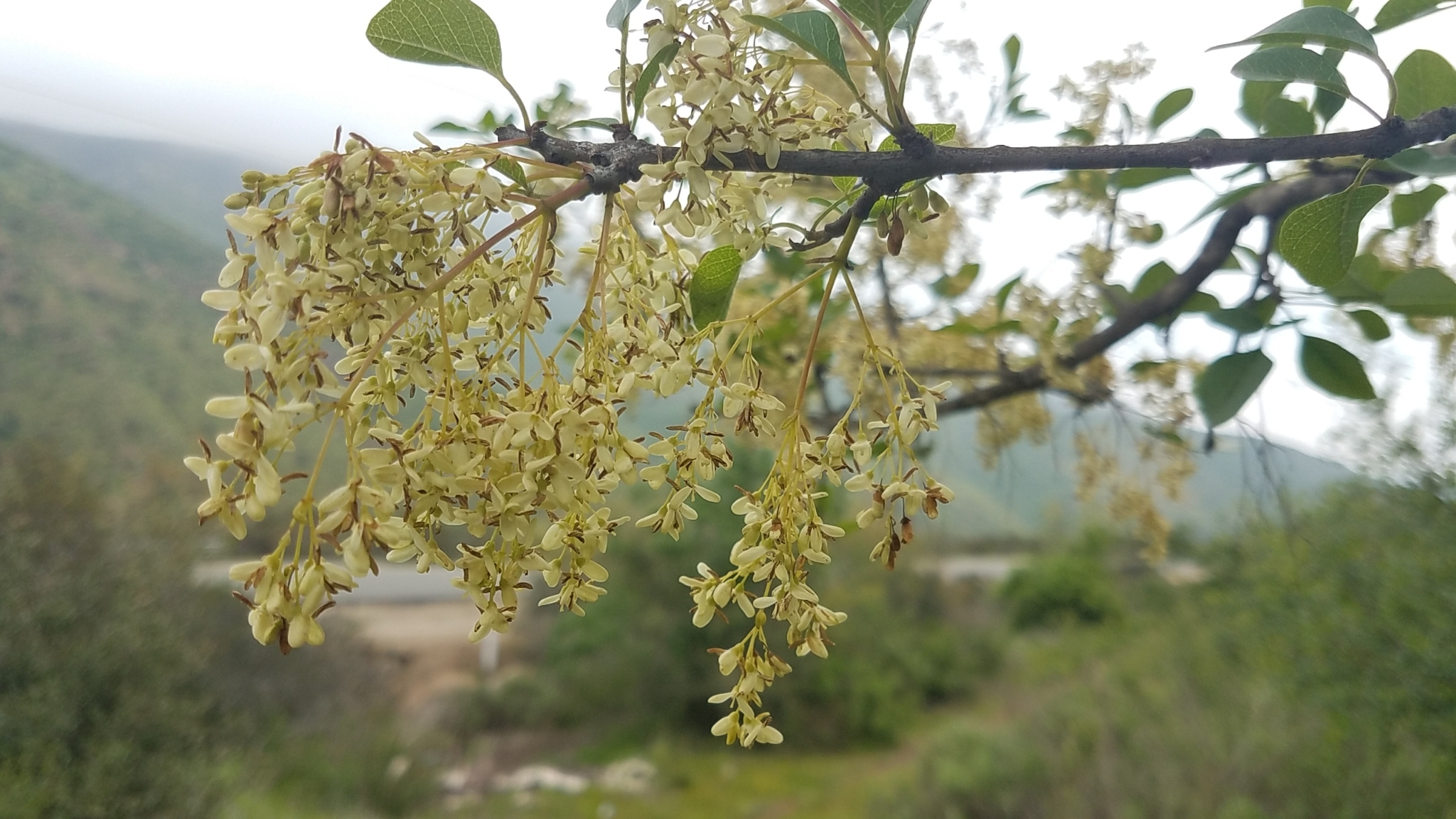
Detail of inflorescence

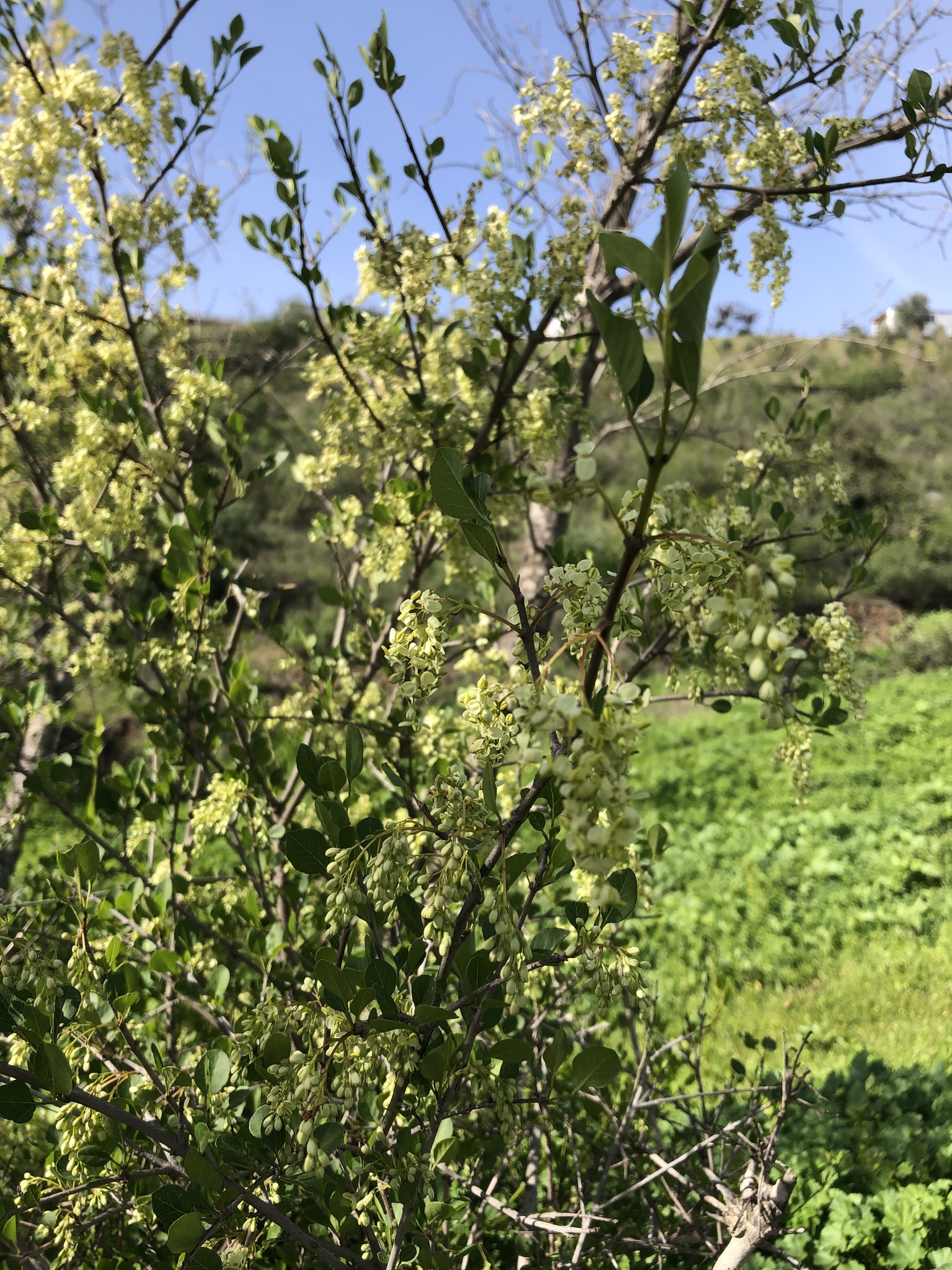
Detail of plant

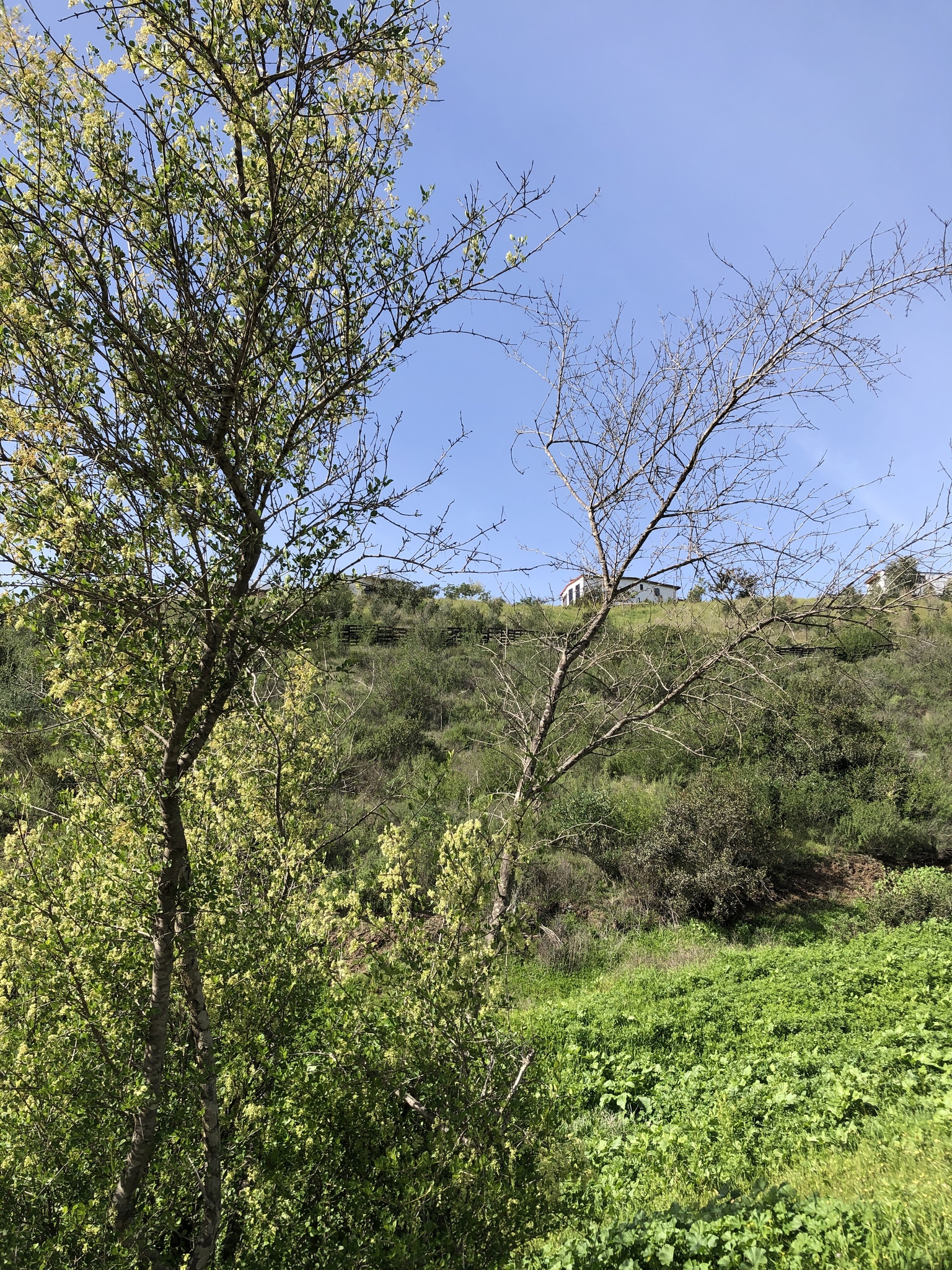
Plant in habitat
