= Deerhorn Valley =

Valley in San Diego County, California

Coordinates: 32.682°N 116.7236°W

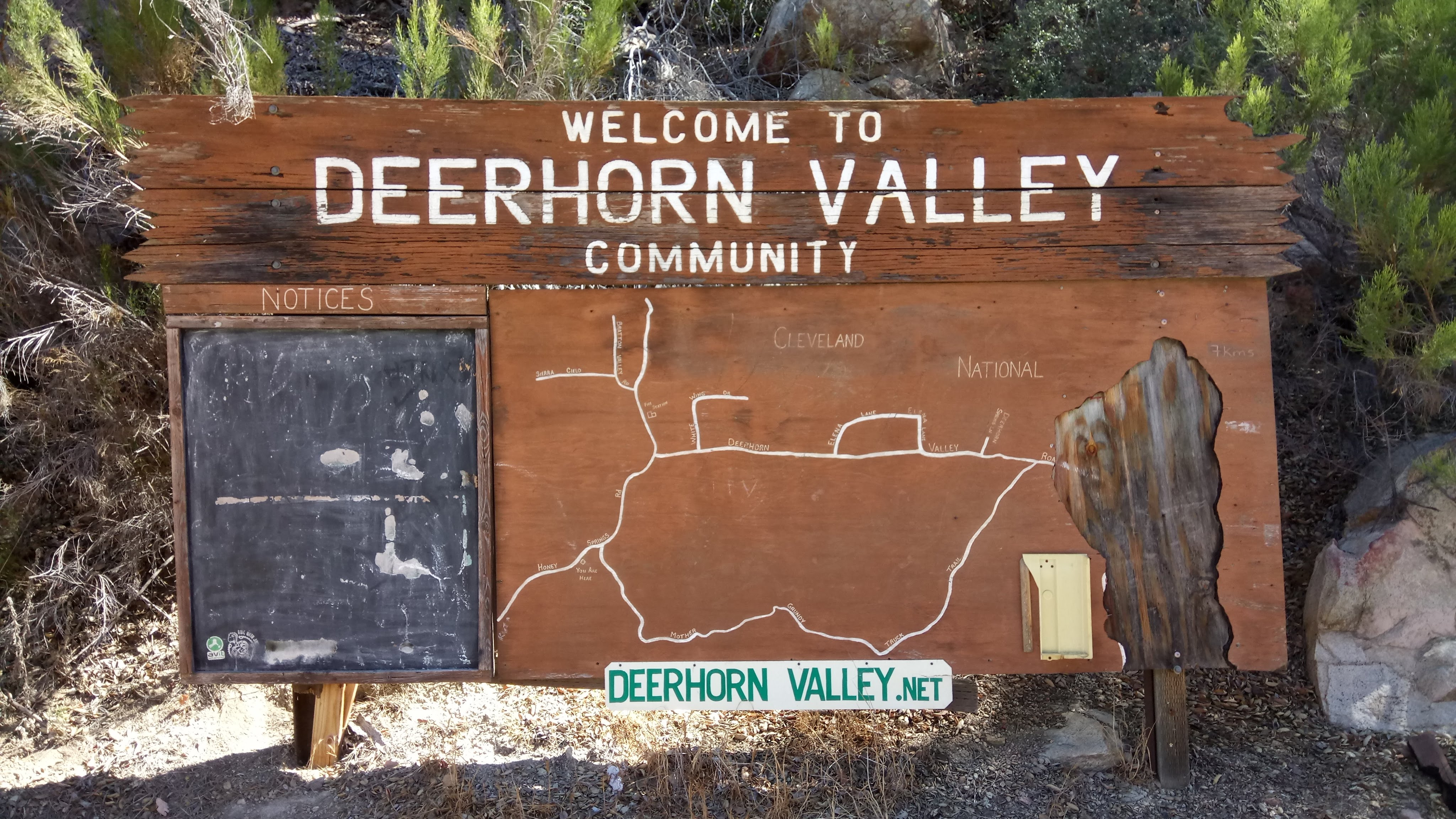
Deerhorn Valley Signpost

Deerhorn Valley is a valley in San Diego County, California. It extends from Lyons Peak in the west to Barber Mountain and Elena Mountain in the north-east.

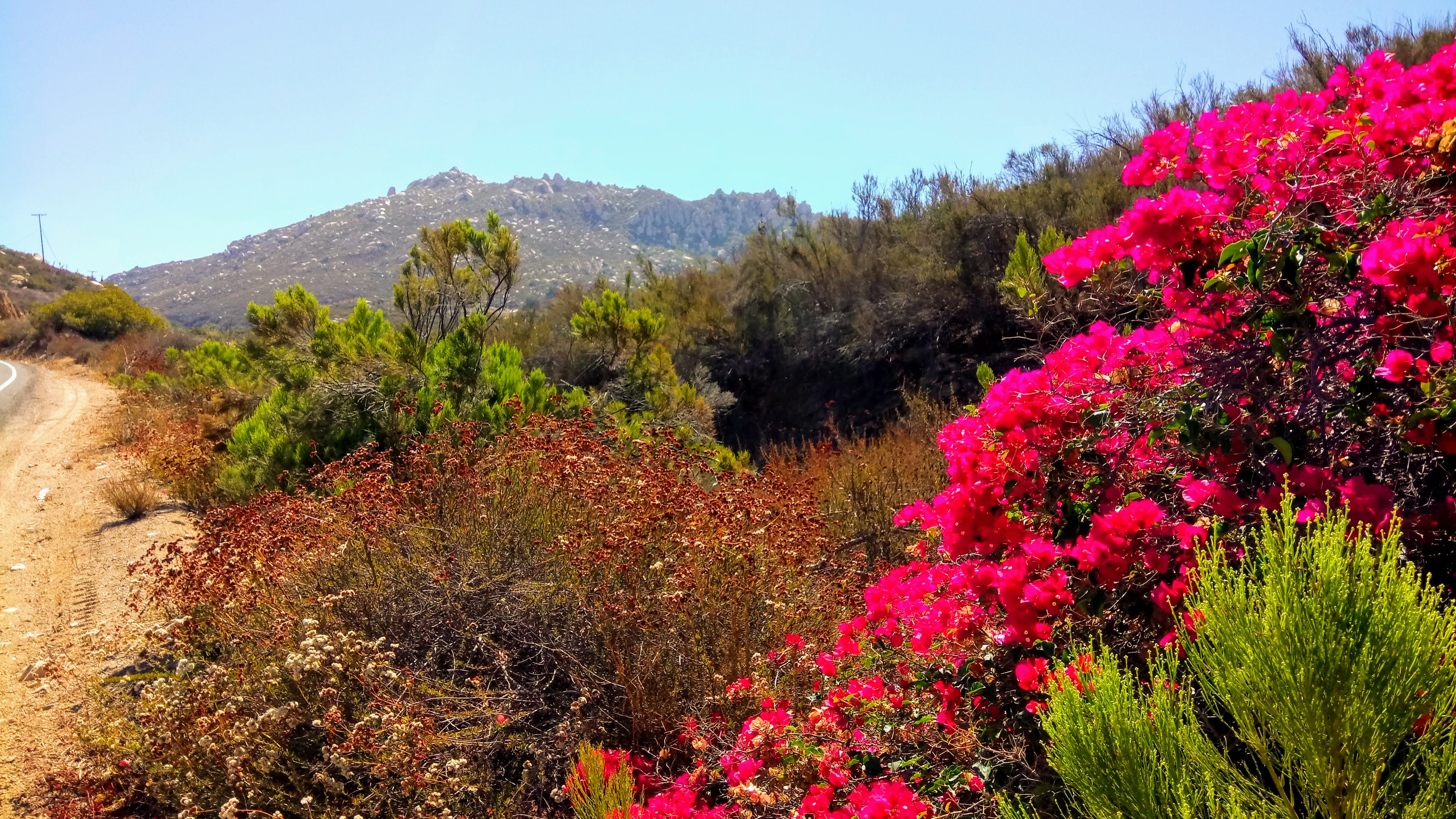
Landscape at Honey Spring Road
