= Cuyamaca Peak =

Mountain in California, United States

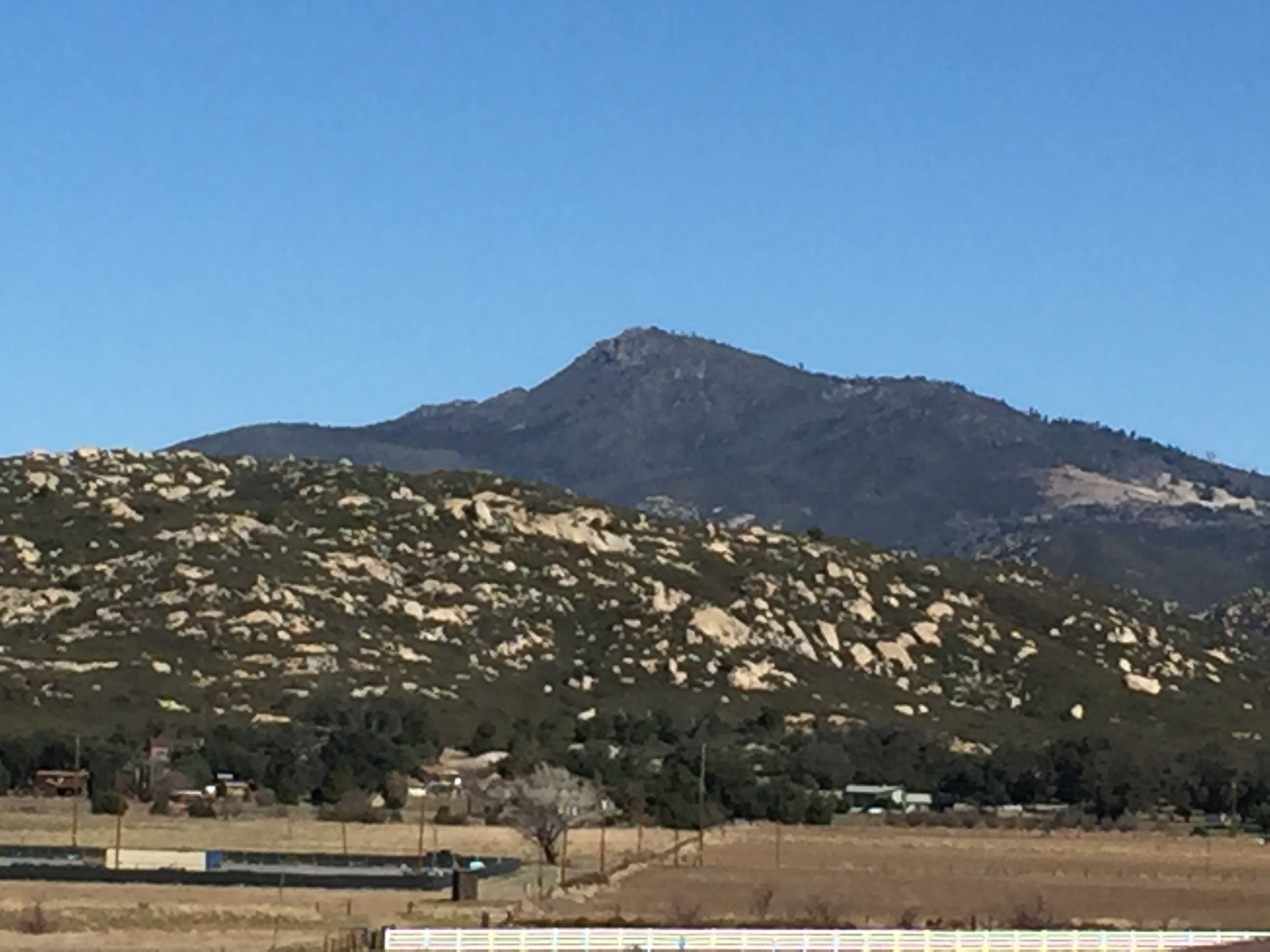
- Cuyamaca Peak from the South

Highest point
- Elevation: 6,512 ft (1,985 m) NAVD 88
- Prominence: 2,855 ft (870 m)
- Listing: Hundred Peaks Section; San Diego peaks list #56
- Coordinates: 32°56′48″N 116°36′24″W

Geography
- Location within California
- Location: San Diego County, California, United States
- Parent range: Cuyamaca Mountains
- Topo map: USGS Cuyamaca Peak

Climbing
- Easiest route: Hike, class 1

Cuyamaca Peak is a mountain peak of the Cuyamaca Mountains range in San Diego County, California.

== Geography ==
At 6,512 feet (1,985 m), its summit is the second-highest point in San Diego County.

Cuyamaca Peak is located roughly 40 miles (64 km) from the Pacific Ocean, within Cuyamaca Rancho State Park. It is east of the city of San Diego and southwest of Julian.

A popular 3.5-mile (5.6 km) year-round hike to the summit of Cuyamaca leads from the Paso Picacho Campground, starting at about 5,000 feet (1,500 m).

== Ecology ==
Snow in winter is common above 5,000 feet (1,500 m) and surrounding regions in Cuyamaca Rancho State Park. During summer, Bracken Ferns, a variety of wildflowers and native bunchgrasses dominate mountain meadows and the forest floor. Prior to the Cedar Fire, Black oaks once lit up the mountain.

=== Cedar Fire ===
In October 2003, the Cedar Fire started roughly 6.5 miles to the NE of Cuyumaca Peak, when a lost hunter started a small signal fire in hopes of rescue; it quickly got out of control and burned through much of the area which hadn't seen a wildfire in over 30 years. Along side Cuyumaca Peak, the rest of the Cuyumaca state park saw a large loss of once-abundant White Fir (Abies concolor), Incense Cedar (Calocedrus decurrens), Jeffrey pine, Coulter pine, Sugar pine, and Black oak (Quercus kelloggii) that once lined the area.

Small seedlings of new White fir, Sugar Pine, Coulter Pine, Jeffrey Pine, and Incense Cedar were seen within a year of the Cedar Fire, mainly due to the amount of fertilizer rich Phos-chek (aerial fire retardant) dropped in the area during the 2003 fires, and were thriving as saplings by 2007, an example of fire ecology.

=== Precipitation ===
The significant elevation of Cuyamaca relative to its surrounding landscape catches Pacific moisture easily, forming clouds which are forced to release their moisture in order to pass east, resulting in average annual precipitation of 20–32 inches (51–81 cm). Fall and Winter storms account for 70%, with summer thunderstorms largely accounting for the balance. During the winter, snow may fall, and hoar frost is common upon the highest elevations.

== Views ==
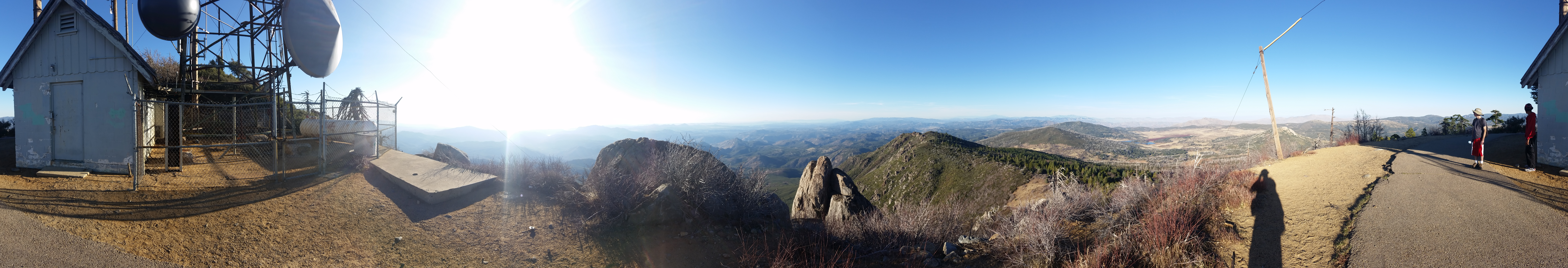
View from the end of Lookout Road atop Cuyamaca Peak.

On clear days, visibility from the summit of Cuyamaca Peak can range from 60 to 100 miles (97 to 161 km) in nearly every direction.

To the west, the Pacific Ocean, the Coronado Islands of Mexico, the coastline of San Diego County, Viejas Mountain, and El Cajon Mountain can be seen.

Looking north, one can see 6,140-foot (1,870 m) Palomar Mountain among the ridge of Palomar Mountains. On very clear days, the 8,716-foot (2,657 m) Toro Peak in the Santa Rosas and the San Jacintos are visible. Closer yet is Volcan Mountain slightly to the northeast, the former gold rush town of Julian lying in front. Directly north are the closest summits, Middle and North Peaks.

Directly east is the Anza Borrego Desert and the Laguna Mountains, including Whale Peak. Far beyond is the Salton Sea. To the south are Lyons Peak and Lawson Peak; further to the southeast are Mexican border mountains such as Table Top Mountain and the Sierra de Juárez.

== See also ==
- Cuyamaca Rancho State Park
- Cuyamaca Mountains
- Cleveland National Forest

== Gallery ==
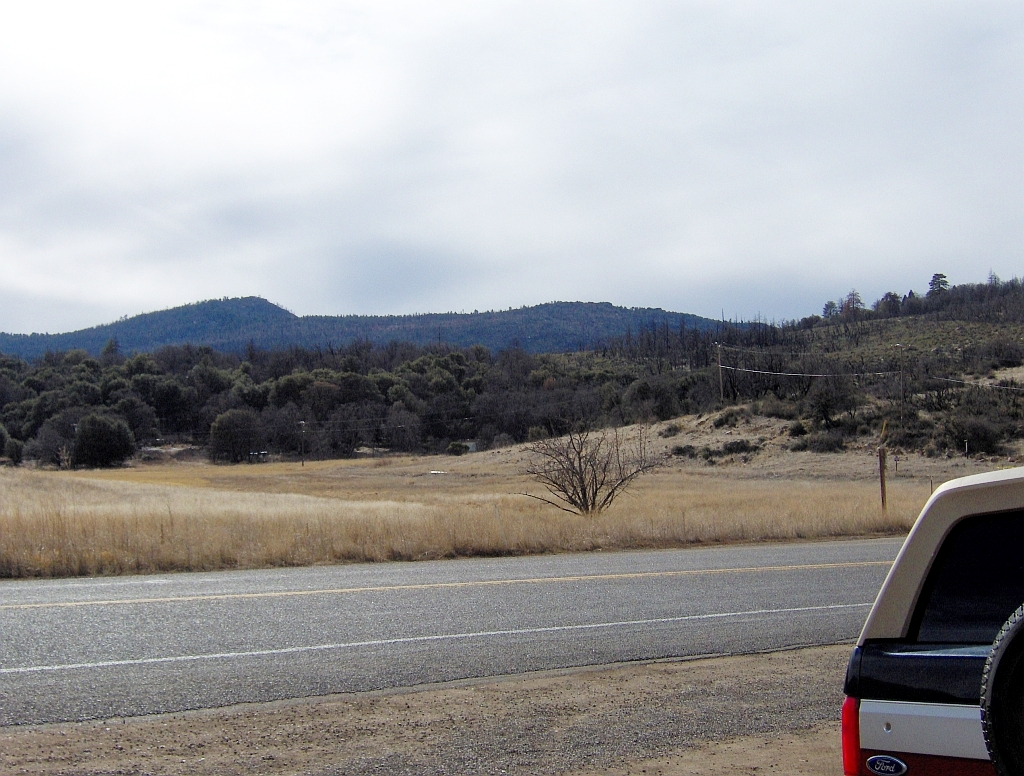
View of Cuyamaca Peak from the east.

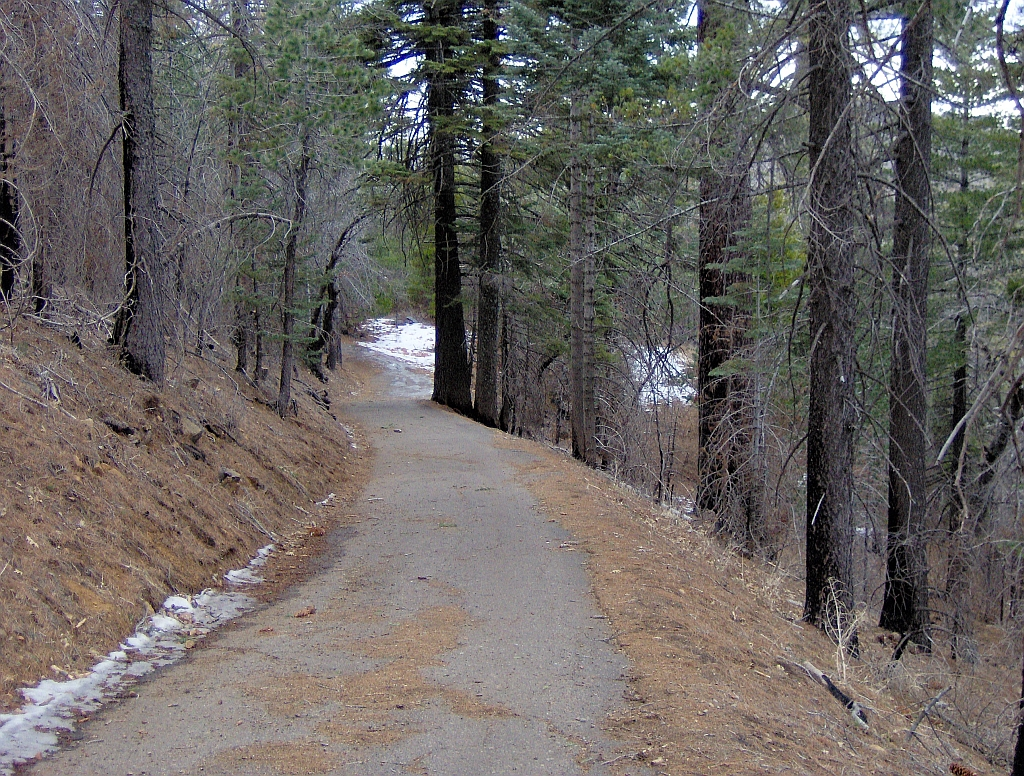
Just down from the Cuyamaca summit.

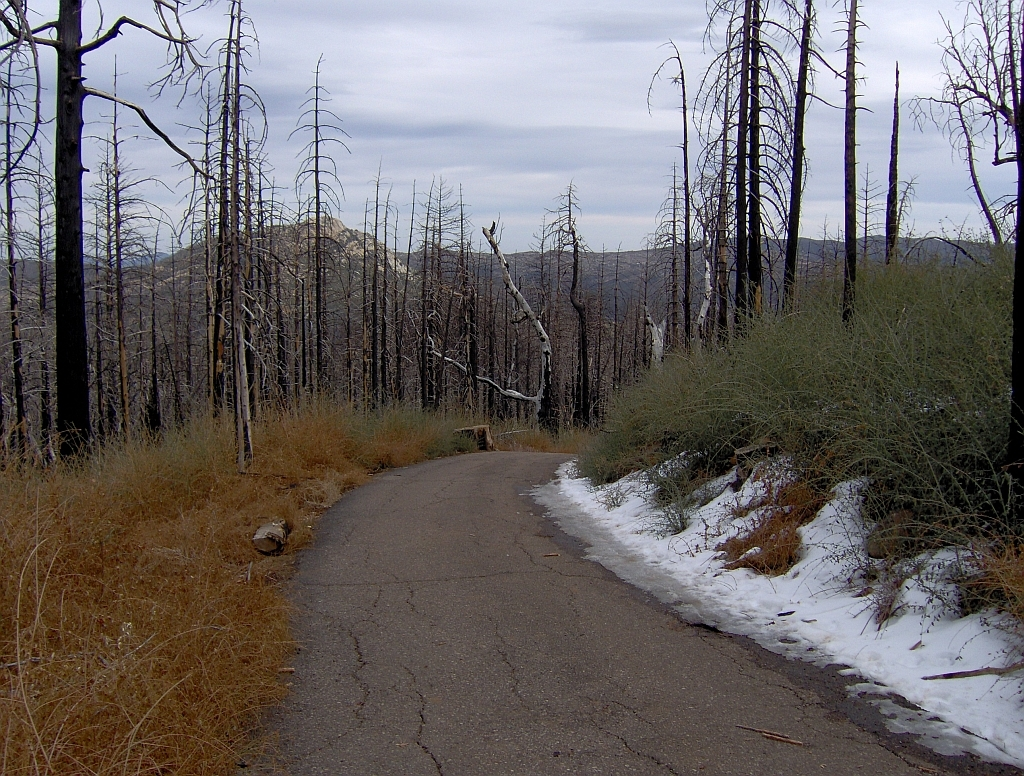
Burned forest on the lower slopes of Cuyamaca.

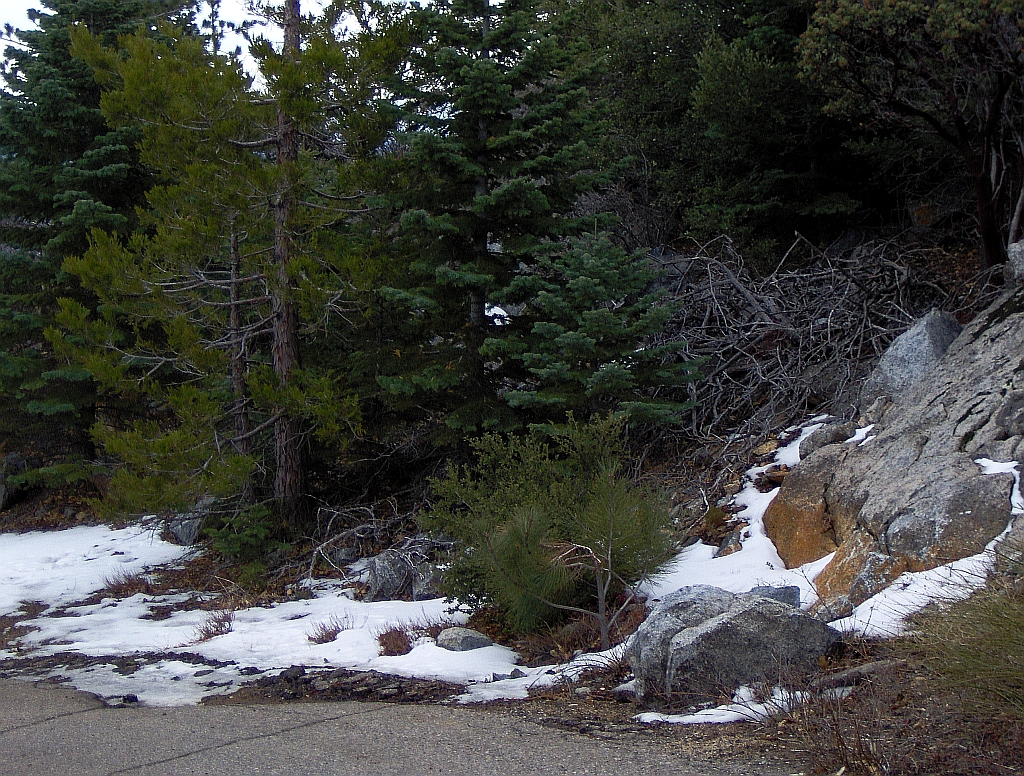
Forest nearing the summit.

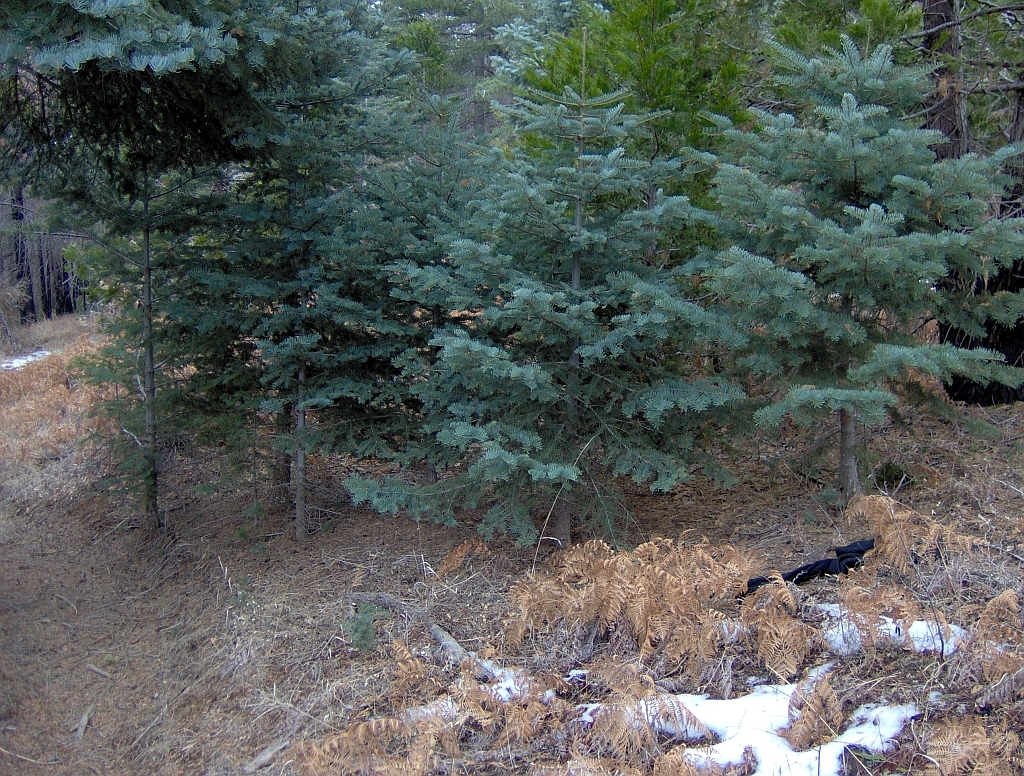
White Firs near Cuyamaca's summit, deceased Bracken Ferns.

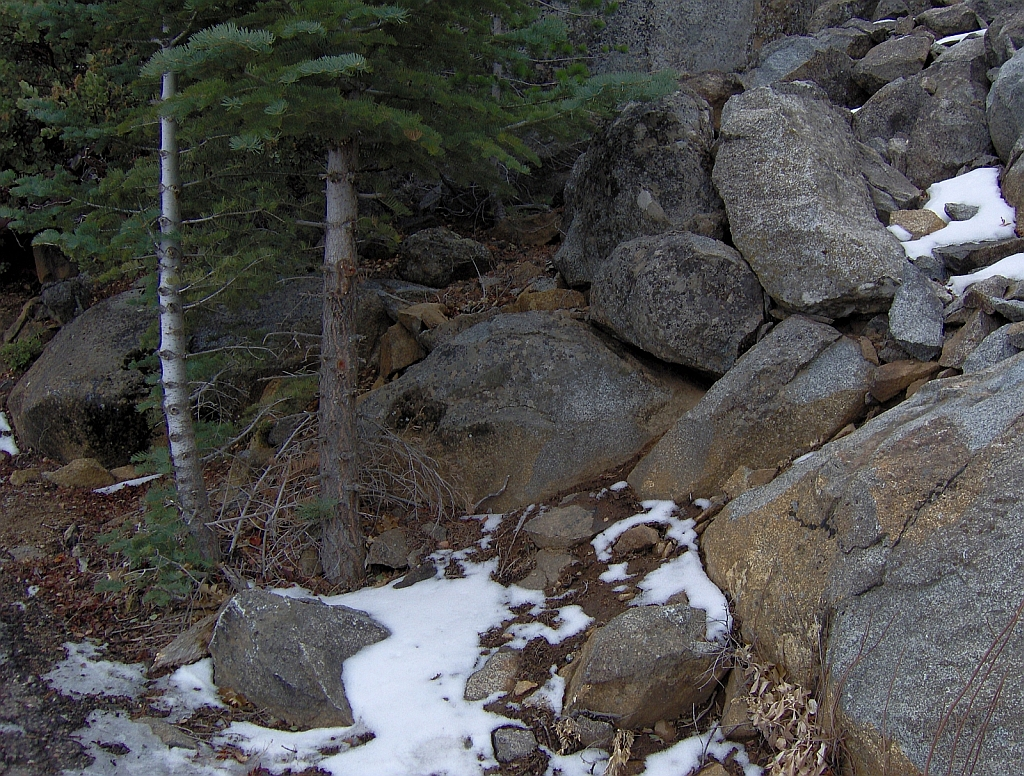
Typical Cuyamaca scene, White Firs, Granite, January snow.

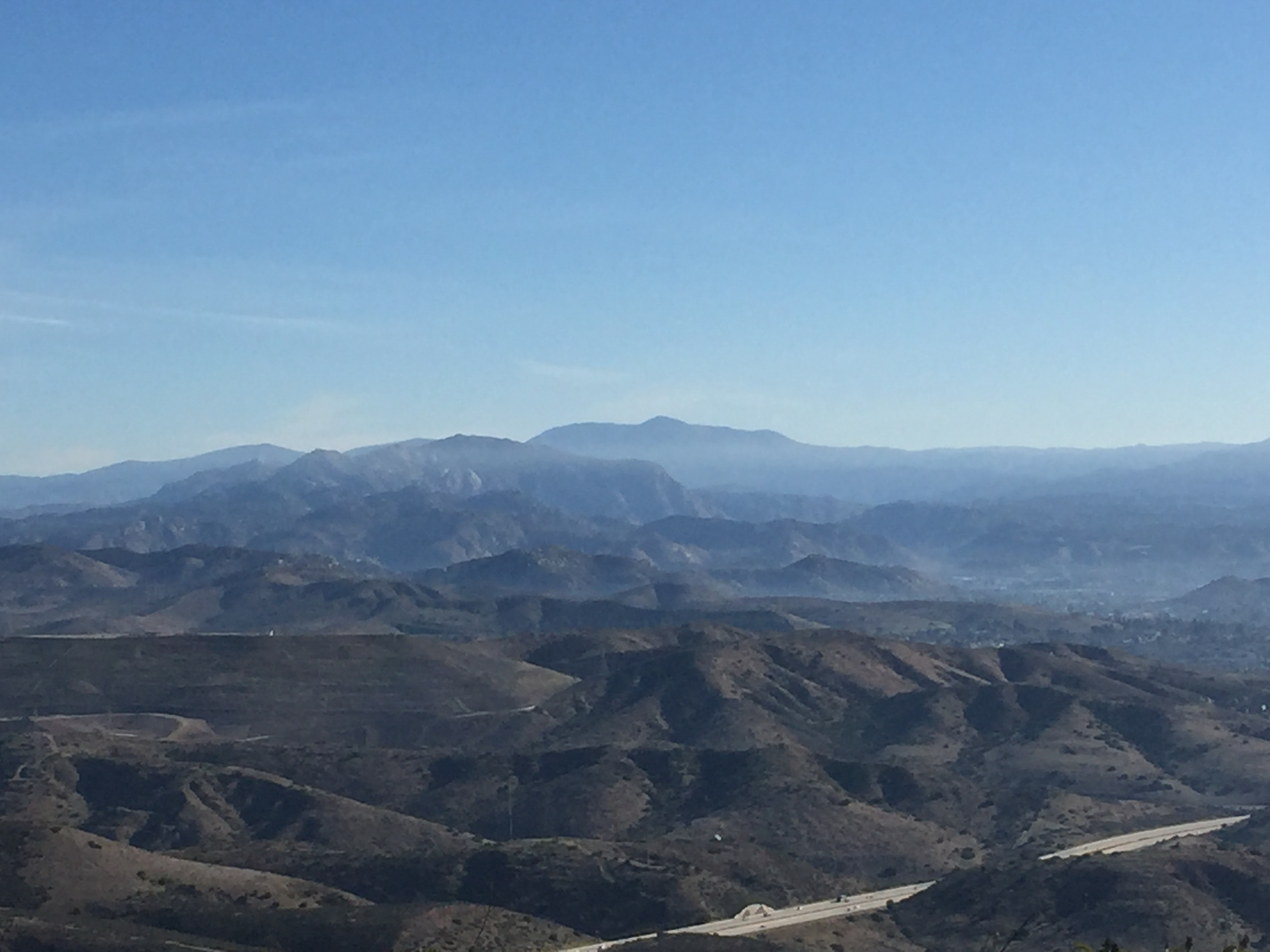
View of Cuyamaca Peak from North Fortuna Mountain in San Diego.

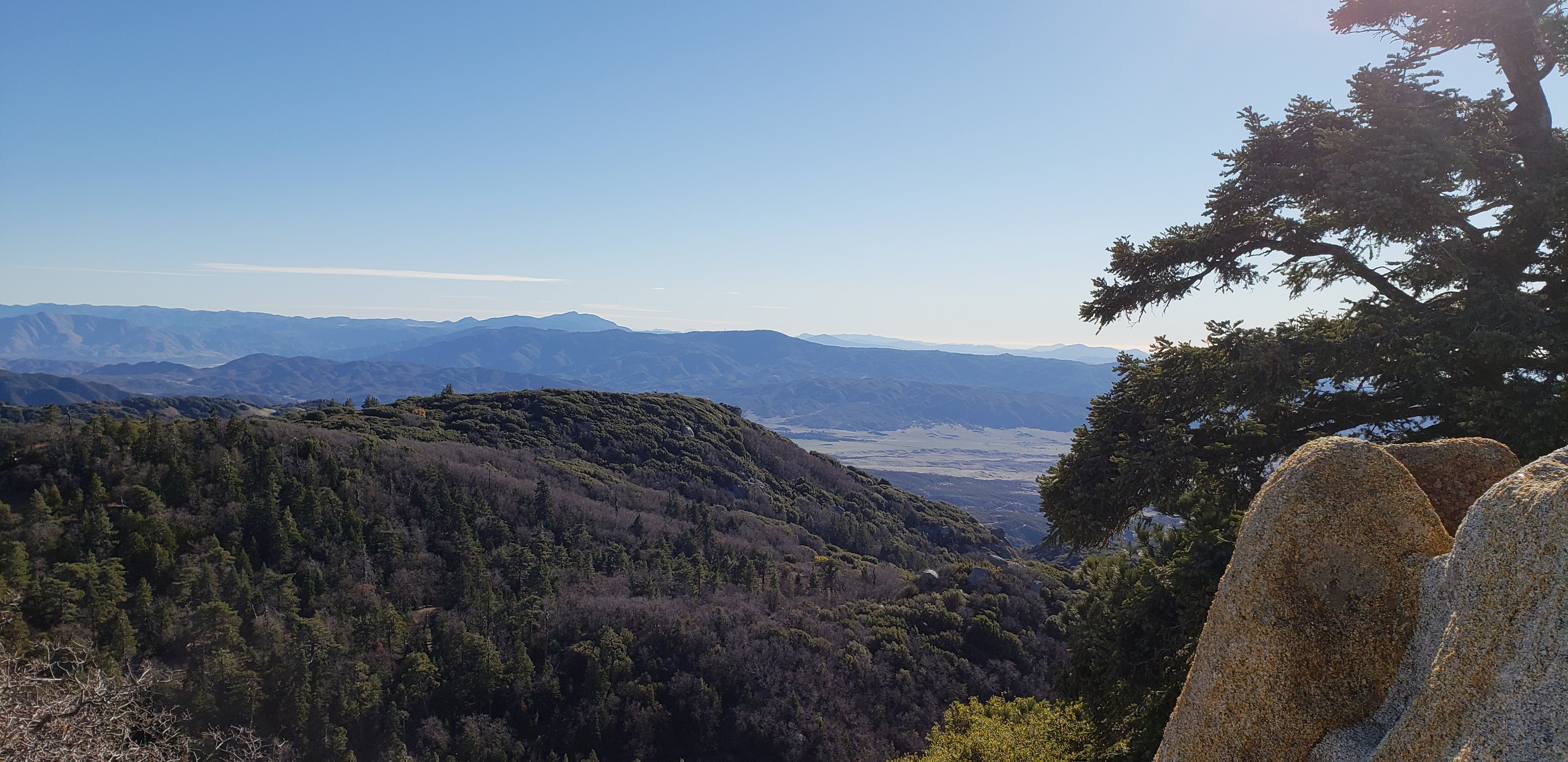
Cuyamaca Peak from Hot Springs Mountain
