= George Cowles =

George Cowles may refer to:

- George W. Cowles (1823–1901), U.S. Representative from New York
- George A. Cowles (1836–1887), ranching pioneer in San Diego, California
- George Cowles (soldier) (1780–1860), representative in the Connecticut General Assembly
- George R. Cowles, member of the Connecticut House of representatives from Norwalk
