= Kumeyaay (disambiguation) =

The Kumeyaay are a Native American people of the Southwestern U.S. and Northwestern Mexico.

Kumeyaay may also refer to:

- Kumeyaay language, spoken by the Kumeyaay people
- Kumeyaay Community College, California
- Kumeyaay Highway or Interstate 8, an interstate highway in California and Arizona
- Kumeyaay Lake, San Diego, California
