= George A. Cowles =

American pioneer

George A. Cowles (April 5, 1836 – November 26, 1887) was a 19th-century American businessperson, founder of banks, companies, and a railway, and Southern California landowner.

He was one of the early business leaders in San Diego and a prominent rancher in San Diego County.

== Early life ==
Born April 5, 1836, and raised on a Connecticut farm in Hartford, his father had been the first to manufacture broadcloth in the US. George was placed to work in a local dry goods store at age 14; by the time he left at 21, he had been promoted to first salesman. He went on to start a cotton mill of his own, which burned a year later.

== Cotton business ==
Cowles became successful in the cotton business as a broker in New York City, moving there when he was 25. That same year he married Jennie Blodgett from Hartford, a girl of 16. He helped organize, and at 30 was the first president of the NY Cotton Exchange.

He retired from the cotton exchange at age 33. During the following year Cowles and his wife traveled the southern states. He next began a manufacturing business producing cotton cloth under government contract using a process he patented. He continued successfully in this venture until 1875.

Cowles and his wife traveled regularly, apparently in part due to her health. In 1870, while touring the South, he contracted malaria in Florida. They traveled several times to California, where Cowles was searching for a preferred site to establish a ranch.

== California ==
The Cowleses first visited the San Diego area in 1873, and in 1875 they began making large purchases of ranch land in the El Cajon Valley in San Diego County. After nearly a year of traveling through Europe, including stays at many health resorts, they settled at their El Cajon ranch in 1877 to begin a career in ranching, though he was in noticeably poor health.

Arriving in California wealthy, and with expertise in business, finance, and agriculture, Cowles accomplished much in the ten years before his death in 1887. The property he purchased eventually totaled about 4,000 acres (16 km^{2}) in the El Cajon Valley and comprised two ranch sites about a mile apart.

One was named "Woodside" where the ranch house was located and the other, probably by their having planted 17 magnolia trees, was named "Magnolia" (today, street names Woodside Ave in Santee and Magnolia Ave in El Cajon are from the Cowles ranches). He planted a great variety of different fruit trees and grapevines, olives, grains and potatoes. The greatest success was in raisins and olives.

Cowles' products gained nationwide attention for San Diego's farming potential, particularly in fruits and vines, and he was called the "Raisin King of the US". He raised fine thoroughbred horses, maintaining about 100 head, and 30 head of cattle. The community that developed around his Woodside ranch became known as Cowlestown.

=== Other businesses ===
George Cowles was an organizer of the Consolidated National Bank, a director of the Commercial Bank, and vice president of the San Diego Trust & Savings Bank. He was also a cofounder of the San Diego Marine Ways & Dry-dock Company on North Island, and was vice president after having turned down the offer of presidency.

==== California Southern Railroad ====
As a director of the California Southern Railroad, later part of the Atchison, Topeka and Santa Fe Railway, he was responsible for extending the railroad from San Diego's 22nd Street Station into the north end of El Cajon Valley,. This included giving free right of way through his ranch properties. The San Diego Trolley Green Line route now runs on some of the right of way, and California State Route 67 also uses a section of the right of way as it turns east from Santee.

== Death ==
George A. Cowles died at age 51 on November 26, 1887, in his room at San Diego's then premier Florence Hotel, succumbing after two weeks to an intestinal ailment. He had just completed the California Southern Railroad negotiations, an effort that some had said hastened his death.

After a well attended funeral at a church in new downtown San Diego, Cowles was buried in the El Cajon Valley. Two years later his remains were moved to the Mount Hope Cemetery in San Diego.

=== Estate ===
Having named both his wife Jennie Cowles, with a trusted friend, as the executors of his will, he left all of his estate to his wife. (They had no children.) The estate was considerable, estimated at between $370,000 and $500,000 then (present day $15–$20 million ). The year after his death, some of her ranch property was subdivided and placed on the market as San Diego's 1880s land boom was ending. Jennie Cowles continued with the remaining ranches into the 1890s.

She married Milton Santee, a real estate developer, in November 1890, and they moved to a house at 11th & B in "New Town" San Diego. Cowlestown's first school was held in a large room at the former Cowles ranch house. A new schoolhouse was built on land Jennie had donated for the school, and the Cowles School was renamed Santee School.

Cowlestown was officially renamed Santee in 1893, for Cowles' second husband Milton Santee. According to historian Harriette Wade, Jennie "lobbied hard" to change the name to Santee in honor of her new husband. A "reluctant vote of the citizens" approved the idea in 1893, Wade said. Cowles Spring later became known as Dog Spring.

== Legacy ==
Cowles Mountain was losing the name that honored George Cowles, becoming locally known as Black Mountain, a second one in the county; and/or 'S' Mountain, from the large white 'S' painted on its face for San Diego State University. However, the historically significant Cowles Mountain name has been used by Mission Trails Regional Park, which it has been within since 1974.
