= Milton Santee =

American politician

Member of the Los Angeles Common Council from the 4th ward
- In office December 9, 1884 – December 13, 1886
- Succeeded by: John Lovell
- Preceded by: Frank Sabichi

Personal details
- Born: April 3, 1835 Pennsylvania, United States of America
- Died: October 16, 1901 (aged 66)

Military service
- Rank: Lieutenant
- Battles/wars: American Civil War

Charles Milton Santee (April 3, 1835 – October 16, 1901) was a 19th-century civil engineer, surveyor, miner, real estate developer, and entrepreneur in Missouri and Southern California.

He developed the town of Ramona, California, and served several terms on the Los Angeles Common Council.

== Career ==
=== Eastern US ===
Santee was a lieutenant from Pennsylvania in the Union Army during the American Civil War.

Missouri

During his early career as a surveyor, Santee made surveys of Dixon, Missouri, and also laid out the town of Richland, Missouri in 1869.

=== California ===
Santee was elected to two consecutive one-year terms to represent the 4th electoral district on the Los Angeles Common Council, the legislative branch of the city, with the first commencing on December 9, 1884, and the second ending on December 13, 1886.

In 1887 he opened the Ramona Hotel in Julian, a hostelry that was later renamed the Kenilworth Inn.

In 1888, Santee had mines in San Diego County, "30 miles from Dos Palmos and three miles from the line surveyed for the Cuyamaca Road." In January of that year he was one of the incorporators of the Lower California Mining Company (Mexico), which was capitalized at $5 million. He later defended a deal the company made with a Chinese consortium that would send Chinese workers to the mines in Mexico:

When everything is in full working order we expect that there will be about 1,000 Mongolians taken down there, all of whom will come out of this State [California], and thereby greatly decrease the unwelcome resident population. According to the Scott Exclusion Act they will not be able to return, although if they want to I have no doubt that they could manage it, for there are only a handful of men guarding the western 1,000 miles of Mexican frontier. But I do not think that they will want to come back, for they will get better wages down there and will not be looked upon with the aversion they are here.

Santee headed a San Diego group that had platted land at what became Coronado, as a site for a resort community, but the endeavor failed. He then bought 6,000 acres of Rancho Santa Maria, "halfway between the coast and the San Diego Gold Country, and surveyed it for sale into small farms and ranches." This area originally had the name Nuevo, but Santee changed it to Ramona, to capitalize on the success of Helen Hunt Jackson's book Ramona, and he began a nationwide sales campaign to sell property there. In 1893 Santee donated land in Nuevo for a park and library; he also laid out the grounds for the park.

== Personal ==
Santee was born in Pennsylvania in 1835.

In 1883, Santee was a member of the Los Angeles Coeur de Lion Commandery, No. 9, Knights Templar. When living in Lassen County, California, he was a charter member of Lake Lodge No. 135, Ancient Order of United Workmen.

He married the widow Jennie Blodgett Cowles in 1890.

Milton Santee died in Los Angeles on October 16, 1901, at the home of his mother, V. Santee, at 210 West 28th Street in today's Historic South Central area. He was survived by his wife, Jennie Cowles Santee; a son Homer Santee; and five siblings, Addison Santee, Mary Santee, Mrs. L. Scofield, Mrs. A. Siddle of Clinton, Iowa, and Mrs. Dr. J.A. Gall of Winslow, Arizona.

=== Legacy ===
Milton Santee is remembered in the renamed city of Santee in San Diego County, California, which was originally named Cowleston, after its founder George A. Cowles, who died in 1887. Cowles's widow, Jennie, married Milton Santee and, according to historian Harriette Wade, "lobbied hard" to change the name to Santee in honor of her new husband. A "reluctant vote of the citizens" approved the idea in 1893, Wade said.
