= East Elliott, San Diego =

Coordinates: 32.8632°N 117.0596°W

East Elliott is an uninhabited community in the city of San Diego. It is bordered by Marine Corps Air Station Miramar to the north and west, the city of Santee to the east, and California State Route 52 to the south. The area houses the Sycamore Canyon Landfill. In 2013 the city of San Diego approved a residential development on the eastern border of the community, and recommended deannexation of the development to Santee.

== History ==
The area comprising East Elliott was once part of Camp Elliott, a training ground for the U.S. Marine Corps purchased in 1941. About half of the camp was declared surplus in 1961 and sold, becoming East Elliott, Tierrasanta, and part of Mission Trails Regional Park. In 1997, the majority of East Elliott was designated as open space under the Multiple Species Conservation Program. In 2003, a residential development company applied to build several hundred homes on the eastern edge of the community, bordering Santee. The Weston development was approved by the city of San Diego in September 2013, along with a recommendation that the area be deannexed to Santee. In October 2013, the city of Santee approved a measure to annex the development.

== Facilities and resources ==
East Elliott contains several distinct types of native habitats, including coastal sage scrub, chaparral, native grassland, and oak and sycamore woodland. A number of endangered and threatened wildlife species inhabit the area. The area represents one of the largest and most biologically diverse open space areas remaining in San Diego.

About 519 acres (210 ha) of the community are designated for use by the Sycamore Canyon Landfill. When the landfill reaches the end of its scheduled use, it will be covered and replanted with native vegetation.
