= Kumeyaay Lake =

Artificial lake in San Diego, California

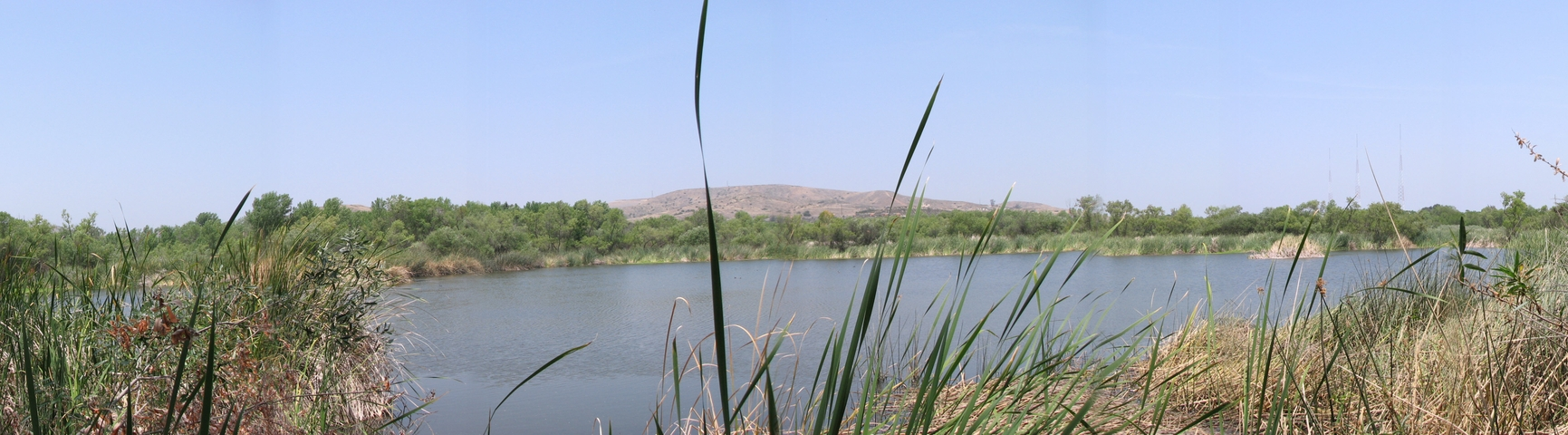

- Location within California
- Location: Mission Trails Regional Park, San Diego County, California, California
- Coordinates: 32°50′29″N 117°01′58″W
- Type: Artificial lake

Kumeyaay Lake is a lake in San Diego, California. It is situated in Mission Trails Regional Park. Formerly a gravel pit, its habitat includes riparian and chaparral plants.

== Bibliography ==
- Lister, Priscilla (23 February 2016). Take a Hike: San Diego County: A Hiking Guide to 260 Trails in San Diego County. Archway Publishing. ISBN 978-1-4808-2540-6.
- Schad, Jerry; Turner, Scott (7 May 2017). Afoot and Afield: 282 Spectacular Outings Along the Coast, Foothills, Mountains, and Desert (5th ed.). Wilderness Press. ISBN 978-0899979199.
