= Cowles Mountain =

Mountain in California, United States

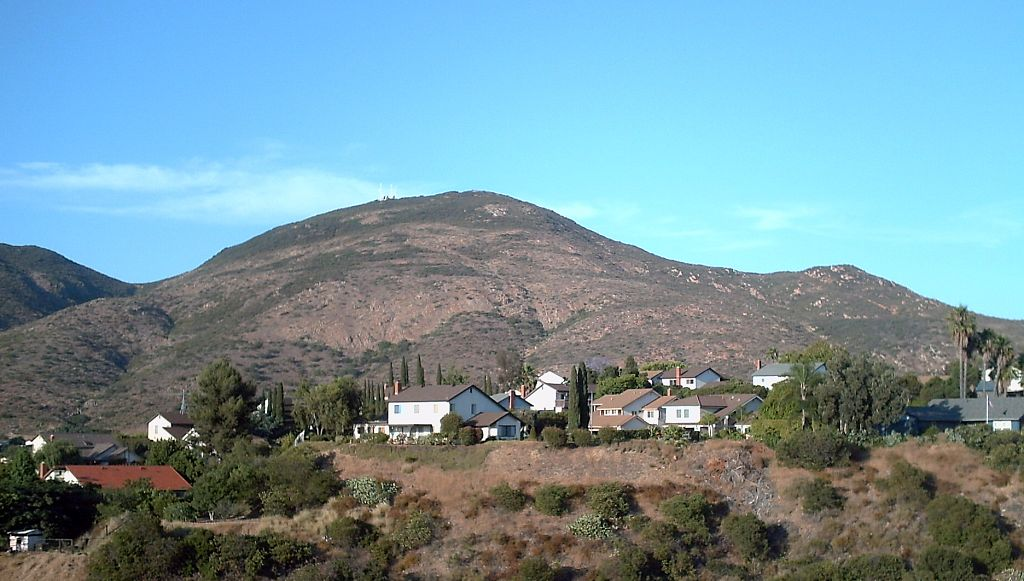
- Cowles Mountain as seen from San Diego. A remnant of the "S" can be seen near the summit.

Highest point
- Elevation: 1,593 ft (486 m) NAVD 88
- Prominence: 991 ft (302 m)
- Coordinates: 32°48′45″N 117°01′52″W

Geography
- Location within San Diego County, California
- Location: San Diego County, California
- Topo map: USGS La Mesa

Climbing
- Easiest route: Trail

Cowles Mountain (pronounced /koʊ̯lz/, see below) is a prominent mountain in San Carlos, San Diego, California. The 1,593-foot (486 m) summit is the highest point of the city of San Diego. It is protected within Mission Trails Regional Park.

== Name ==
The mountain is named after George A. Cowles, a rancher and businessperson in southwestern San Diego County during the 1870s and 1880s.

=== Pronunciation ===
The pronunciation of the mountain's name is of debate among San Diegans. While some use the pronunciation /kaʊ̯lz/ (rhyming with fouls /faʊ̯lz/), the authorities of the Mission Trails Regional Park (among others) insist that the only correction pronunciation is /koʊ̯lz/ (homophonous with coals), which is how Mr. Cowles is said to have pronounced his name.

== History ==
=== San Diego State University ===
For many years Cowles Mountain was locally known as "S" Mountain. In 1931, 500 students from San Diego State College, now San Diego State University (SDSU), painted a 400-foot-tall (120 m) letter "S" on the side of the mountain, after which it took on its popular name. In April 1942, during World War II, the military ordered the "S" covered up for national security, as it could serve as a potential reference for enemy aerial attacks for strategic sites. After the war, the painting tradition was resurrected.

In the 1970s, the annual repainting tradition was ceased for environmental and habitat protection but had a brief resurgence in the late 1980s. The "S" has not been repainted for nearly three decades. Except in 1991, when the senior class of Patrick Henry High School painted the "S" into a "9" and added a "1" next to it as a senior prank.

== Mission Trails Regional Park ==
The entire mountain, with marked trails, is a protected area within Mission Trails Regional Park, which opened in 1972.

=== Trails ===
The main trail to the summit is a popular hiking destination taking hundreds of people per day to a 360-degree panorama of San Diego County. The hike to the top is 1.5 miles (2.4 km) long and an elevation change of about 950 feet (290 m). This trail is on the corner of Golfcrest Drive and Navajo Road. A much-less-used but maintained trail begins near the intersection of Boulder Lake Avenue and Barker Way. This trail meets the main trail near the summit.

On March 25, 2013, the trails of Cowles were closed for maintenance. The trails were reopened in May 2013 after several improvements to water drainage and rock steps.

== Geology ==
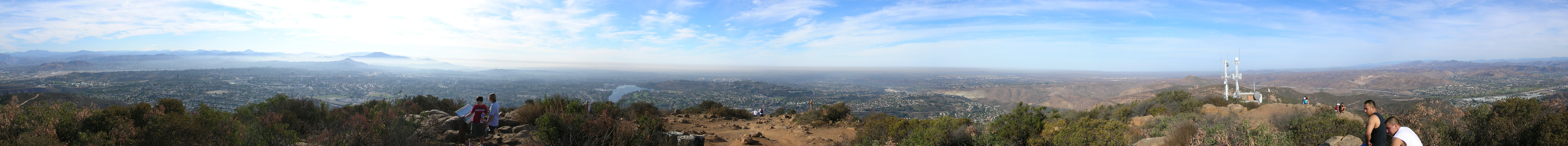
360 degree panorama taken from the top of Cowles Mountain.

Cowles Mountain consists of Jurassic and early Cretaceous metavolcanic and shallow intrusive igneous rocks that are resistant to erosion, and never covered by later Cretaceous and Tertiary sedimentary overburden. Small plateaus on the south and east slopes are the remnants of an extensive terrestrial, near sea level erosional surface called the Poway Terrace that are now about 1,200 feet (370 m) in elevation.

A prominent former seacliff on the west side rises above a now-dry wave-cut terrace, now mostly covered with suburban developments, at about 600 feet (180 m) in elevation.
