= Old Mission Dam =

- U.S. National Register of Historic Places
- U.S. National Historic Landmark
- California Historical Landmark
- San Diego Historic Landmark
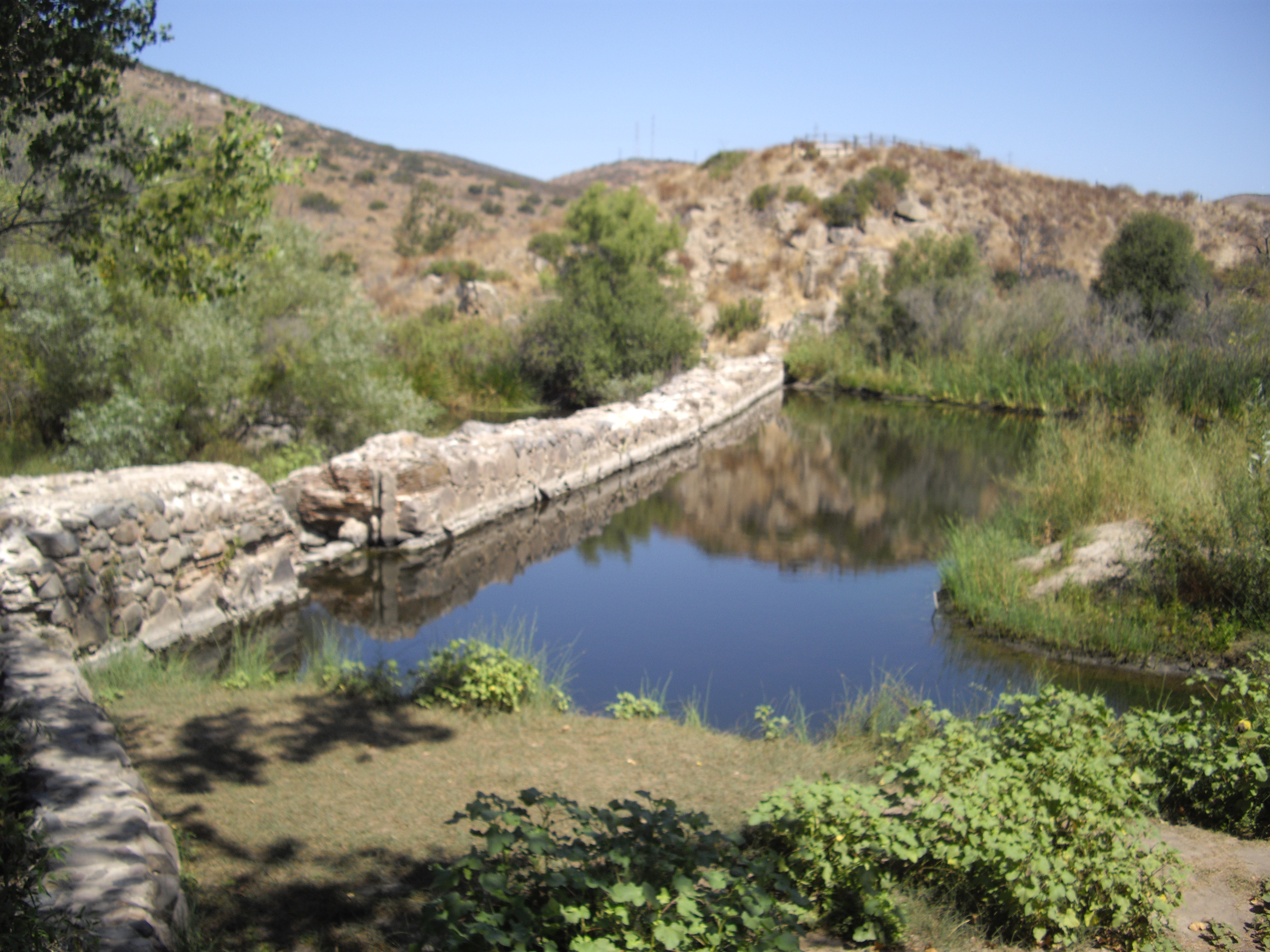
- Old Mission Dam in 2008

- Location within San Diego County, California Location within California Location within the United States
- Location: Mission Trails Regional Park, San Diego, California
- Coordinates: 32°50′24″N 117°2′32″W
- Area: 0.3 acres (0.12 ha)
- Built: 1803
- NRHP reference No.: 66000225
- CHISL No.: 52
- SDHL No.: 2

Significant dates
- Added to NRHP: October 15, 1966
- Designated NHL: May 21, 1963
- Designated CHISL: December 6, 1932
- Designated SDHL: February 1, 1968

Old Mission Dam is a historic water impoundment structure in Mission Trails Regional Park in San Diego, California. It was built in 1803 to impound the San Diego River to provide water for irrigation of the fields associated with Mission San Diego de Alcalá, the first Spanish mission in what is now the US state of California. It was the first major colonial-era irrigation project on the Pacific coast of the United States. The surviving remnant of the dam was designated a National Historic Landmark in 1963.

== Description and history ==
Old Mission Dam is located about 5 miles (8.0 km) northeast of the site of Mission San Diego de Alcalá, in the hills northeast of San Diego. It spans the San Diego River, which was historically a seasonal body of water which dried out in the summer. The dam is built out of stone and cement, and was 220 ft long (67 m), 13 ft wide (4.0 m) at its base and 12 ft high (3.7 m) as originally built. The dam created a body of water behind it, which would undergo controlled releases when the river otherwise ran dry. A tile channel to the mission fields was also built, to minimize water loss in the sandy soil, but only fragments of this work still survive.

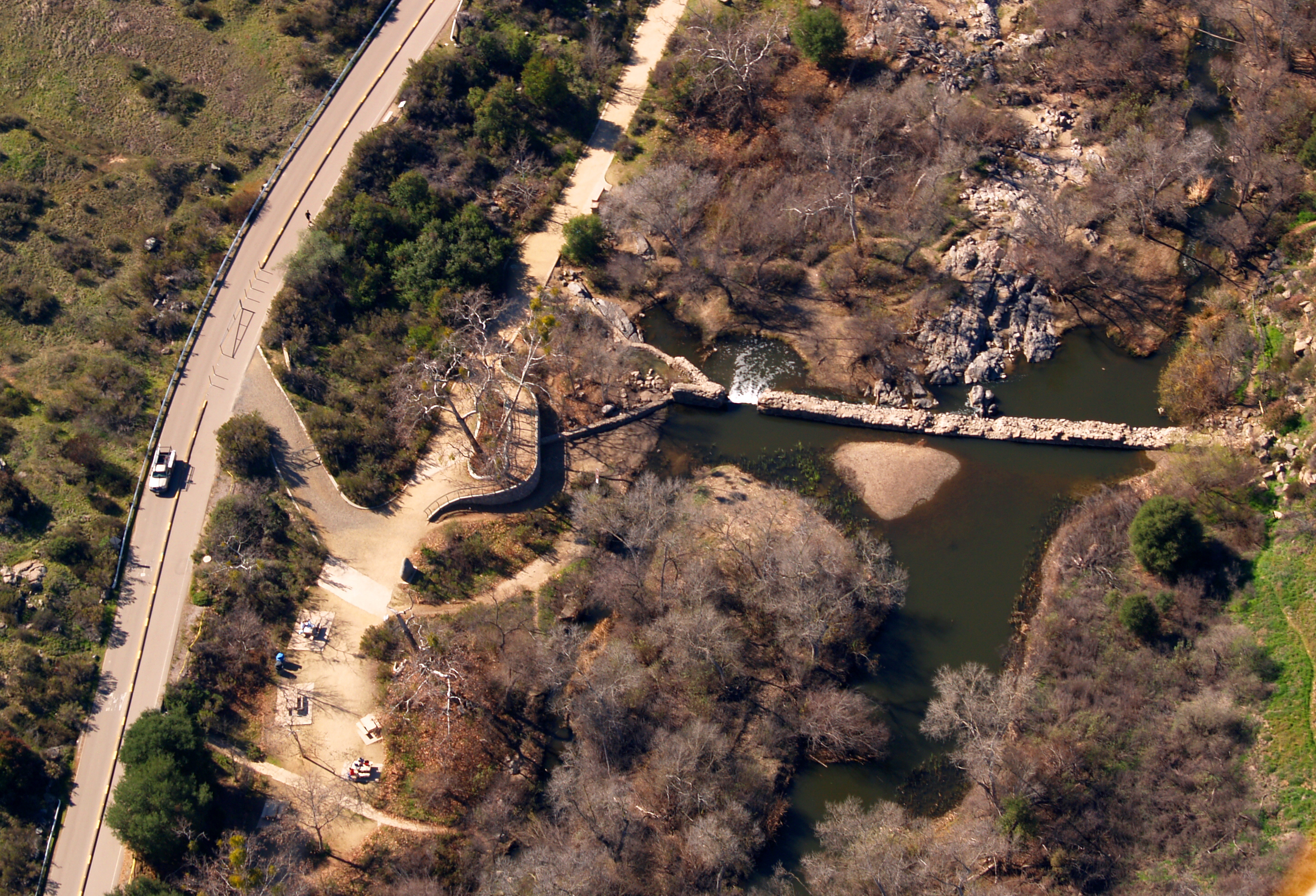
Aerial view of the dam from 1,000 feet

Mission San Diego de Alcalá was founded in 1769 by Father Junipero Serra, and was moved to its present surviving site in 1774. By 1800, the mission was a thriving community with 1,500 Christianized Native Americans. The mission suffered three years of drought in 1800–1802, which likely prompted construction of the irrigation project. The works probably reached their greatest extent in 1817, including the tiled aqueduct and other features lost to time and vandalism. The dam and aqueduct were reported to be in ruins in 1867, but the dam was repaired in 1874 and again put to use for a time.

The dam is now part of Mission Trails Regional Park, the largest municipal park in California. Old Mission Dam is also a registered state historic landmark.

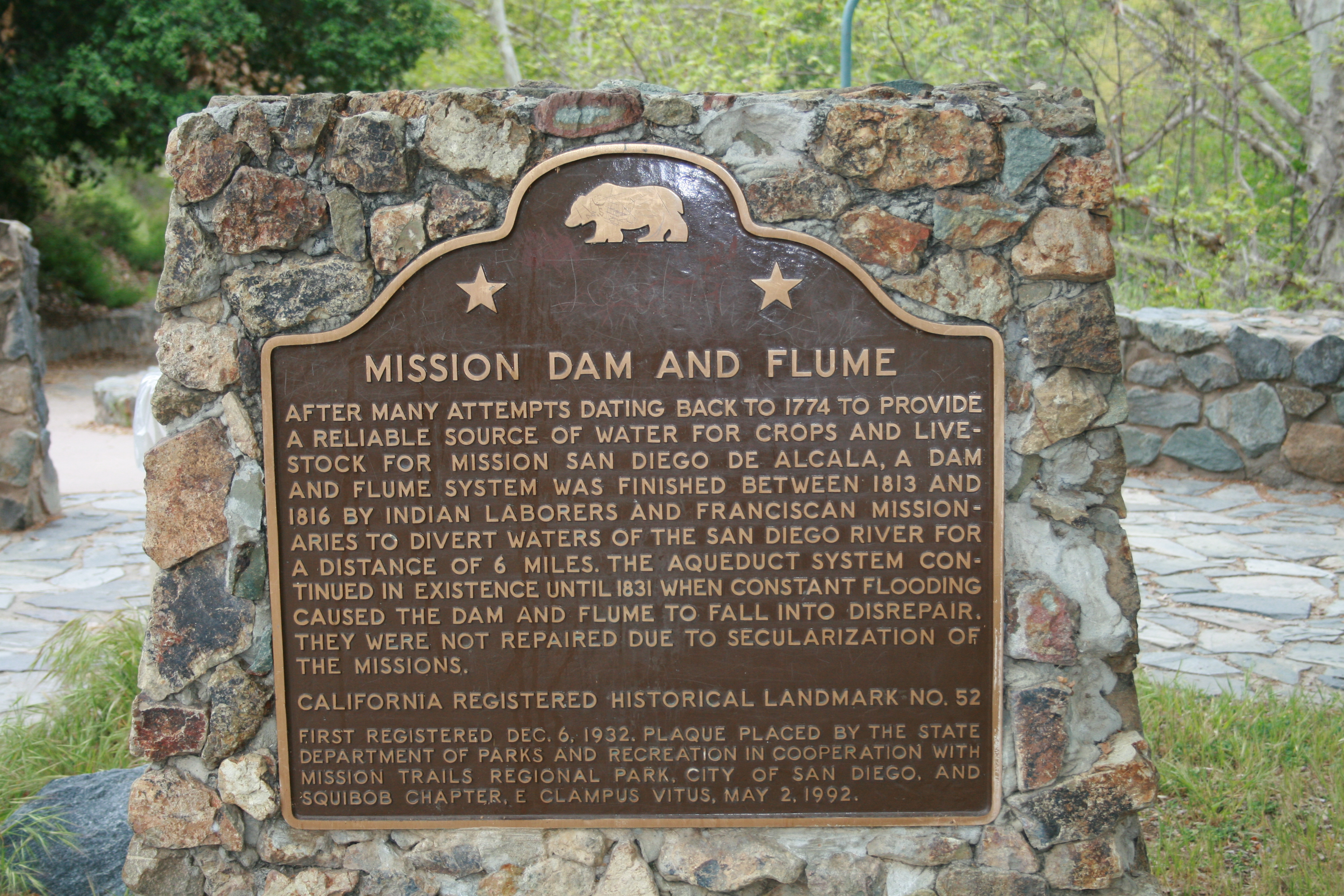
Mission Dam & Flume, 4/2009

== See also ==
- National Register of Historic Places listings in San Diego County, California
- List of National Historic Landmarks in California
