= Mission Trails Regional Park =

Open space preserve in San Diego, California

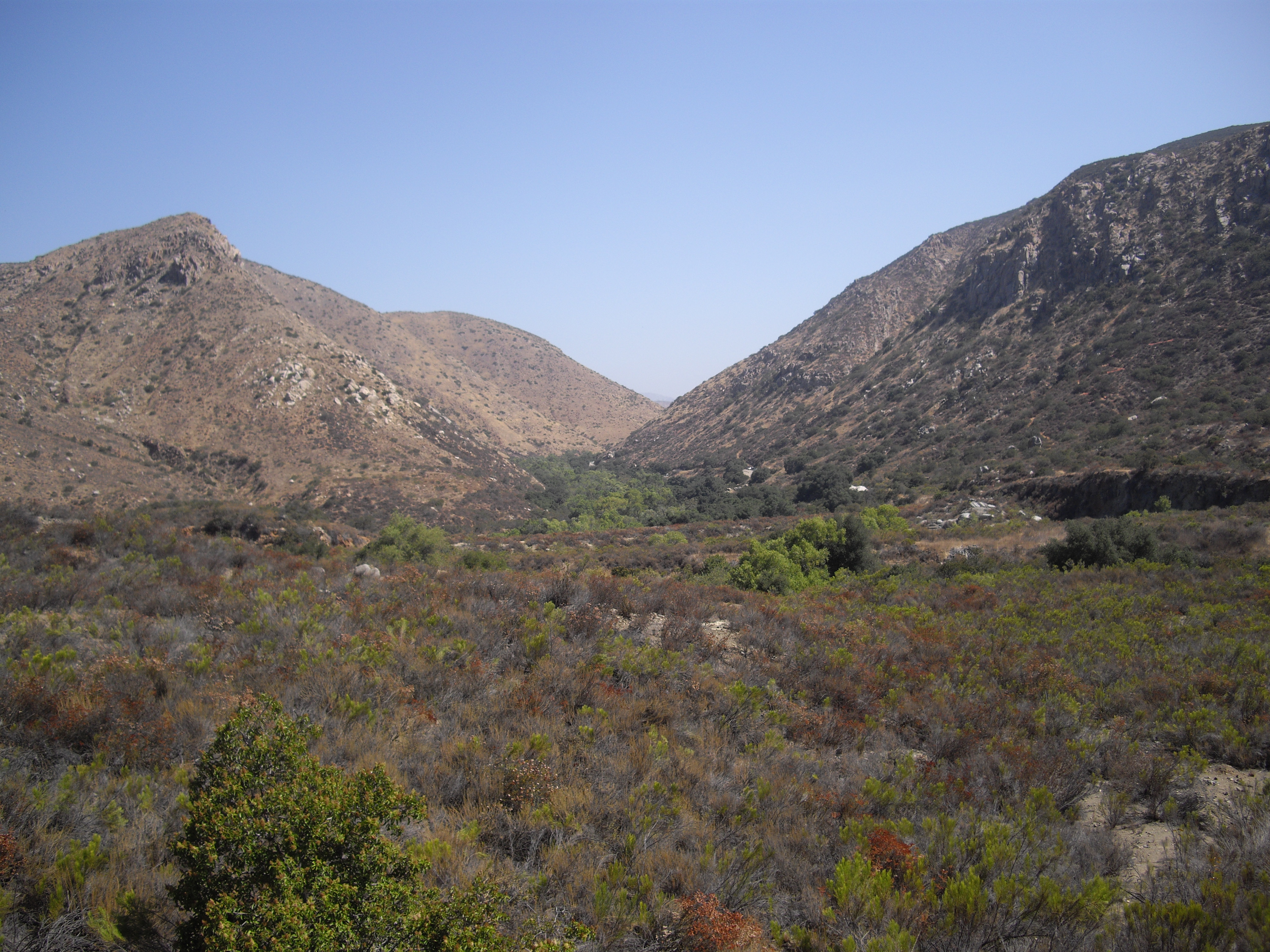
- View of the park and gorge from the visitors center

- Location within California Location within the United States
- Location: San Diego, California
- Nearest city: San Diego
- Coordinates: 32°49′47.99″N 117°3′18″W
- Area: 7,220 acres (2,920 ha)
- Established: 1974
- Visitors: 2 million (2024)
- Governing body: Mission Trails Regional Park Foundation

Mission Trails Regional Park (MTRP) is a 7,220-acre (29.2 km^{2}) open space preserve in San Diego, California, United States. The park was established in 1974. It is the sixth-largest municipally owned park in the United States, and the largest in California.

== Description ==
The park consists of over 8,000 acres (32 km^{2}) of rugged canyons and hills, with both natural and developed recreation areas. It is the seventh-largest open space urban park in the United States, consisting of over 8,000 acres (32 km^{2}). The highest point is 1,591-foot-high (485 m) Cowles Mountain, which is also the highest point in the city of San Diego. The San Diego River flows through the park. The park is open every day of the year.

The park has 60 miles of hiking, mountain bike and equestrian trails, a rock climbing area, and the Kumeyaay Lake Campground with 46 camp sites adjacent to a small lake. There is also the 14,000-square-foot (1,300 m^{2}) Mission Trails Regional Park Visitor and Interpretive Center. It includes a number of exhibits, a library, and a 93-seat theater that includes a Blu-ray projection system with a large screen. The Visitor Center also includes an art gallery. The most popular trail of the park is the Cowles Mountain trail (pronounced Colz), which takes hundreds of people per day to the summit for a 360-degree panorama of San Diego County. Another popular stop is Old Mission Dam, which was built to supply irrigation water to farm land that supplied food for the Mission San Diego de Alcala, the first of the chain of missions established by Junípero Serra in California.

=== Management and events ===
The park is managed by the Mission Trails Regional Park Foundation. The MTRP Foundation was named the district's nonprofit of the year in May 2025.

A photograph of Cowles Mountain, facing east, taken on the trail to Pyles Peak

Special annual events at Mission Trails include the Amateur Photo Contest which begins in March, with entries due by the middle of April.

In 2015, the MTRP organized the "Five Peak Challenge", where hikers are challenged to complete all five of the park's highest peaks (Cowles and Pyles peaks, Kwaay Paay, North and South Fortuna). The challenge originated as a way to decentralize the hiking traffic on Cowles mountain and encourage hikers to try the other peaks in the park. Increasingly, hikers began challenging themselves to complete the 14 miles (23 km) of hiking within a single day. The challenge was discontinued in 2020, though locals still attempt to summit all five peaks.

In 2024, the park celebrated the 50th anniversary of purchasing Cowles mountain.

== Natural history ==
The park is in the California chaparral and woodlands ecoregion. It has coastal sage and chaparral and riparian habitats and plant communities of California native plants.

San Diego is home to 23 species of bats and many are able to be found within the MTRP. This includes, but is not limited to; the Mexican free-tailed bat, hoary bat, Yuma myotis, canyon bat, western red bat, Townsend's big-eared bat, big brown bat, and western mastiff bat. Volunteers began leading "bat walks" in 2022, allowing visitors to the MTRP to observe and learn about bats and other nocturnal creatures of the park.

Rattlesnakes can be found within the MTRP. Bites have been recorded, though in 2000 an estimated 98 percent of bites came from people harassing the snakes.

In 2024, the MTRP Foundation engaged with environmental firm RECON to assess invasive species and assist with habitat restoration. Some targeted invasive species of brush include fountain grass, mustard seed, fennel, and oxtongue.

== Expansions ==
In 2017, the MTRP foundation was dedicated 178 acres to expand the MTRP following a 2014 agreement between the planned community north of the park and conservationists. This expanded the park to nearly 7,400 acres (3,000 ha), one of the largest in the United States at the time.

On December 17, 2014, West Sycamore was officially opened to the public. This increased the size of the park by just over 1,100 acres and includes 6 miles of trails. West Sycamore is located adjacent to the Scripps Ranch community and is at the very east end of Stonebridge Parkway. It is north of the main area of MTRP.

A major expansion, referred to as an update to the 2019 Master Plan, was approved in May 2019. This plan would expand the park by 2,600 acres (1,100 ha) to 9,800 acres (4,000 ha) in total size. This would include areas near Scripps Ranch and north of State Route 52. The plan would include additional trails, restrooms, parking, and shade structures.

In 2020, a 5,000 square feet (460 m^{2}) ranger station was opened in the eastern part of the MTRP.

=== 2022 expansion plans ===
In July 2022, the City of San Diego purchased 25 acres to add onto the park. In September 2022, The Mission Trails Regional Park Foundation announced that it had received a 2 million dollar grant from the San Diego River Conservancy to extend the park. This proposed addition for adding more land would be within the uninhabited planning are of the East Elliott Community, north of State Route 52 and bordering the Marine Corps Air Station Miramar.

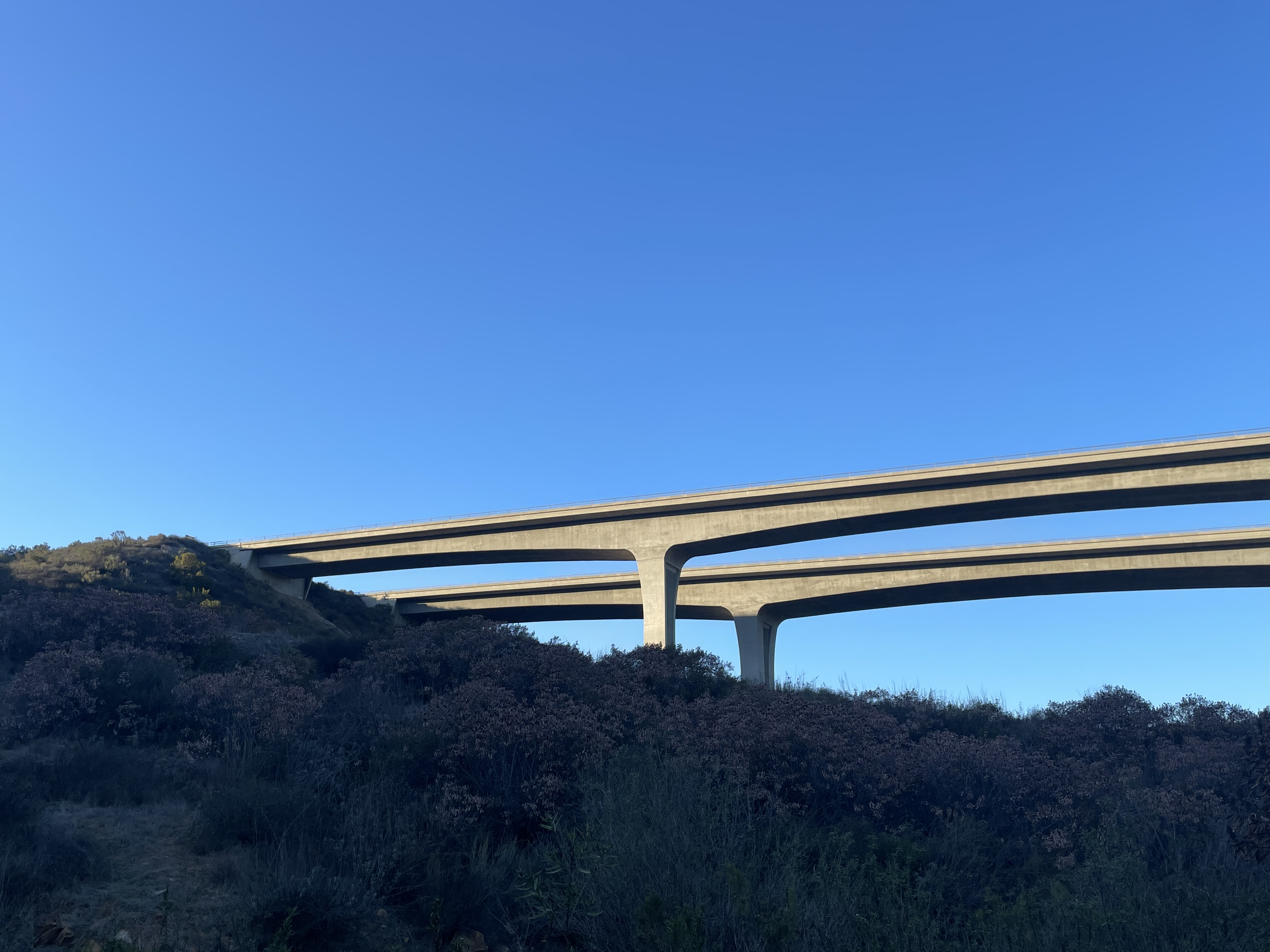
California State Route 52 crossing Oak Canyon in the park

The MTRP Foundation acts as a nonprofit group dedicated to preserving, protecting, and improving the park and is receiving the grant from the San Diego River Conservancy (SDRC) since the San Diego River runs directly through Mission Trails, including Old Mission Dam which is a historic conifer for the river. The SDRC operates as an independent, non-regulatory state agency established with a similar goal to the MTRP Foundation by intending to preserve, restore, and enhance protected regions or systems in and around the river. This may also include other watershed ecological areas such as adjacent canyons.

Due to the preserve already being one of the largest urban parks in the United States, both of the new acquisition efforts will obtain ultimately more than 100 additional acres of land for the park. Both purchases would support the park's "2019 Master Plan Update" and the City of San Diego's Multiple Species Conservation Program (MSCP), which aims to preserve essential landscapes and their (largely endemic) ecosystems. Notably, the introduction of such projects which are characterized by extension of the park's borders as well as preservation of additional scenic landscapes would also support the policies of related organizations like The California Natural Resources Agency by virtue of imparting a variety of ecological benefits such as habitat conservation, and protection of wildlife corridors in addition to related areas like the San Diego River's watershed segments which are still a part of Mission Trails. This includes the small, surrounding scenic zones of Lake Murray and nearby canyons.

The expected conservancy grant is estimated to take up to two years. During this time, the MTRP Foundation will work to secure additional funding to support other land acquisition opportunities in the East Elliott Community Planning Area. Altogether, this could result in roughly 600 additional acres.

== 2003 Cedar Fire ==
A significant portion of the park was burned by the Cedar Fire in 2003. As is typical of a chaparral ecology, within a few years the park had recovered and exhibited little evidence of recent fire damage.

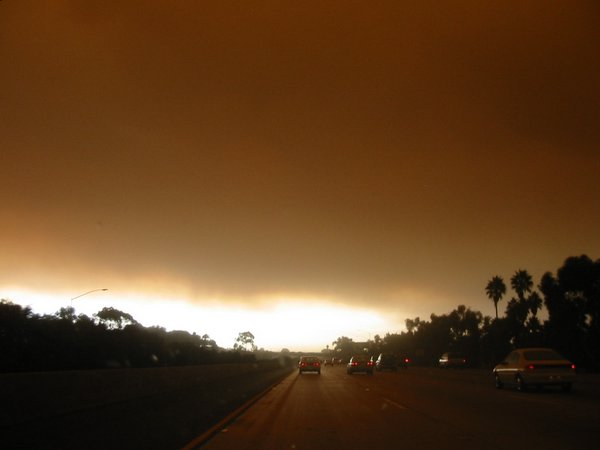
View from a car during the 2003 Cedar Fire

== Restoration Efforts ==
The 2003 Cedar Fire burned about 2,800 acres in the Mission Trails Regional Park. This caused the park to be littered with dried brush and invasive plants. The nonprofit Mission Trails Regional Park Foundation led a project to clean the park. On September, 23rd, 2026 the crew cleaned 60 tons of dried brush and invasive plants. They plan to continue these efforts into Fall 2027 in hopes of restoring the park to its original state.

== See also ==
- Kumeyaay
- San Dieguio

== Sources ==
- San Diego's Mission Trails Regional Park : Official Guidebook, by Pamela Crooks, 2003, ISBN 0-9706219-1-4
