= Lyons Peak =

Mountain in San Diego County, California, United States

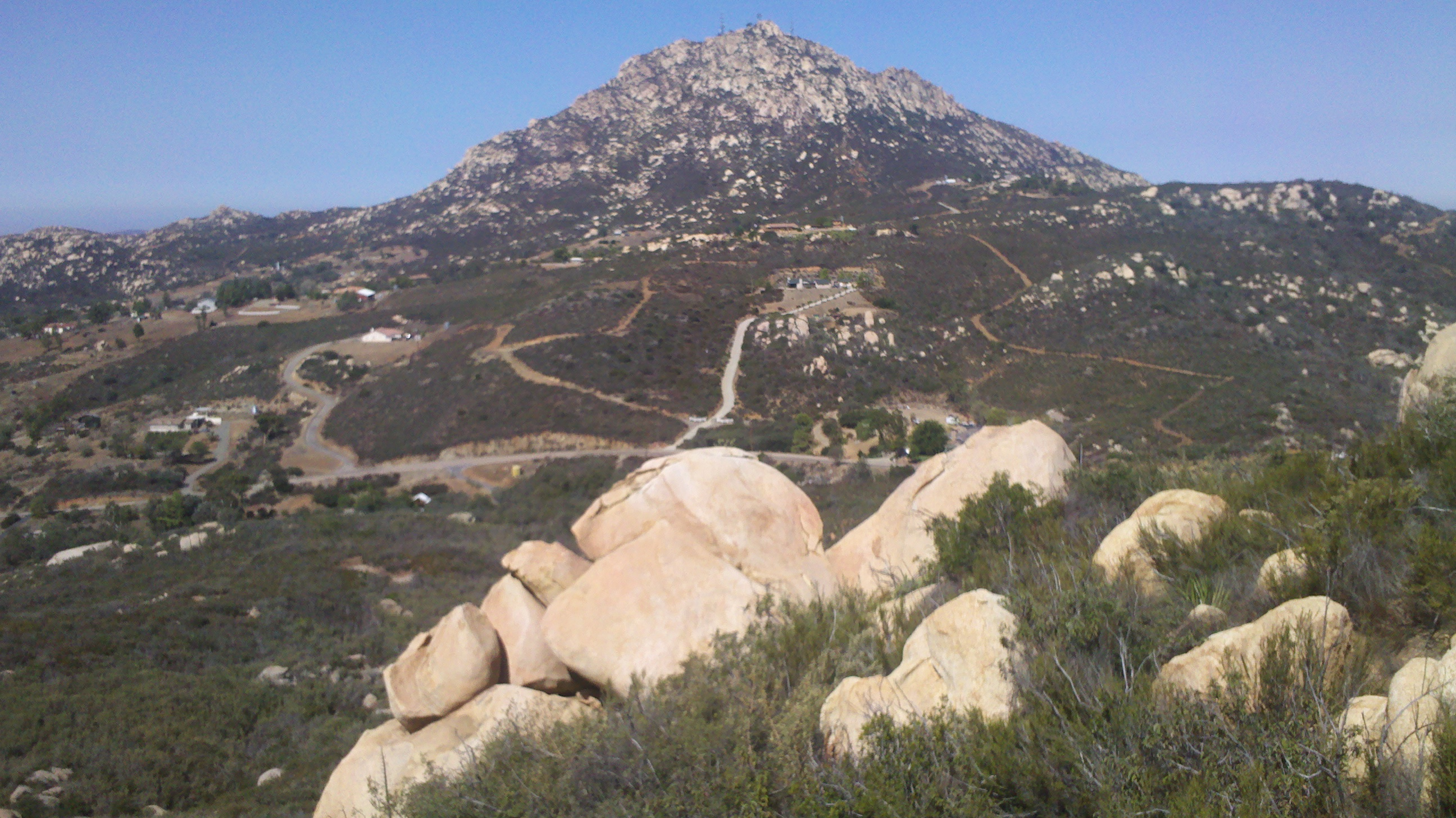
- Lyons peak from the east

Highest point
- Elevation: 3,741 ft (1,140 m)
- Prominence: 1,360 feet (415 m)
- Isolation: 3.69 mi (5.94 km)
- Coordinates: 32°42′06″N 116°45′51″W

Geography
- Location: San Diego County, California, U.S.
- Topo map: USGS Dulzura

Lyons Peak is a prominent mountain in San Diego County, California. The top of the mountain is enclosed in an almost rectangular patch of Cleveland National Forest. An old fire lookout tower is located at the peak.

Lyons Peak is located on restricted land and trespassing is prohibited. The peak's toponym honors Nathaniel Lyon (1818–1861). As an army captain, he passed by the peak in 1851 while scouting a new route east to the desert.
