= Ballena, California =

Unincorporated community in California, United States

- Unincorporated community
- Interactive map of Ballena, California
- Coordinates: 33°3′55″N 116°44′48″W
- Country: United States
- State: California
- County: San Diego
- Time zone: UTC-8 (PST)
  - Summer (DST): UTC-7 (PDT)
- ZIP code: 92065
- Area codes: 442/760
- FIPS code: 06-66004

Ballena is an unincorporated community in the Ballena Valley of San Diego County, California.

Ballena is east of Ramona and west of Santa Ysabel, at the junction of California State Route 78 and the Old Julian Highway.

== History ==
The area of Ballena is named after the nearby Whale Mountain in the northwestern Cuyamaca Mountains. The Ipai name for the mountain was Epank, meaning "whale," and ballena is the Spanish word for "whale."

Ballena began in 1870, as a way stop and layover point for freight wagons, which provided fresh teams of horses and mules for the wagons on the road between the gold rush camps of Branson City, Coleman City, Eastwood and Julian − and the ports of National City and San Diego.

Sam Warnock opened a general store and post office there. The post office operated from July 27, 1870, to September 26, 1894, then from August 12, 1896, to August 30, 1902, when it was moved to Witch Creek.
