= List of places in California (K) =

This list of current:

- cities
- towns, unincorporated communities
- counties, and other recognized places in the U.S. state of California.

Information on the number and names of counties in which the place lies, and its lower and upper ZIP Code bounds, if applicable are also included.

Name of place	Number of counties	Principal county	Lower zip code	Upper zip code
Kadota	1	Merced County		
Kagel Canyon	1	Los Angeles County	91342	
Kaiser	1	San Bernardino County		
Kaiser Center	1	Alameda County	94612	
Kaiser's Eagle Mountain	1	Riverside County	92241	
Kamondorski	1	Alameda County		
Kamp Klamath	1	Del Norte County	95548	
Kanawyers	1	Fresno County		
Kane Spring	1	Imperial County		
Karnak	1	Sutter County	95645	
Karuk Reservation	2	Humboldt County		
Karuk Reservation	2	Siskiyou County		
Kathryn	1	Orange County		
Kaweah	1	Tulare County	93237	
Kearney	1	Los Angeles County		
Kearsarge	1	Inyo County		
Keddie	1	Plumas County	95952	
Keefer	1	Butte County		
Keeler	1	Inyo County	93530	
Keenbrook	1	San Bernardino County		
Keene	1	Kern County	93531	
Keene Summit	1	Mendocino County	95427	
Kegg	1	Siskiyou County		
Keith	1	Ventura County		
Kekawaka	1	Trinity County		
Kellog	1	Sonoma County	94515	
Kelsey	1	El Dorado County	95643	
Kelseyville	1	Lake County	95451	
Kelso	1	San Bernardino County	92351	
Kennedy	1	San Joaquin County		
Kennedy Meadow	1	Tuolumne County	95370	
Kenny	1	Mendocino County		
Kensington	1	Contra Costa County	94707	
Kensington Park	1	San Diego County		
Kentfield	1	Marin County	94904	
Kenton Mill	1	San Bernardino County		
Kentucky House	1	Calaveras County		
Kentwood-In-The-Pines	1	San Diego County		
Kent Woodlands	1	Marin County	94904	
Kenwood	1	Sonoma County	95452	
Keough Hot Springs	1	Inyo County	93514	
Kerens	1	San Bernardino County		
Kerlinger	1	San Joaquin County		
Kerman	1	Fresno County	93630	
Kern City	1	Kern County		
Kernell	1	Kern County		
Kern Homes	1	Kern County	93306	
Kern Junction	1	Kern County		
Kern Lake	1	Kern County		
Kernvale	1	Kern County	93240	
Kernville	1	Kern County	93238	
Kester	1	Los Angeles County	91405	
Keswick	1	Shasta County	96001	
Kett	1	Shasta County		
Kettenpom	1	Trinity County		
Kettleman	1	San Joaquin County		
Kettleman City	1	Kings County	93239	
Kevet	1	Ventura County		
Keyes	1	Stanislaus County	95328	
Keyesville	1	Kern County		
Keystone	1	Los Angeles County		
Keystone	1	Tuolumne County	95327	
Kibesillah	1	Mendocino County		
Kiesel	1	Yolo County		
Kilaga Springs	1	Placer County		
Kilkare Woods	1	Alameda County	94586	
Kilowatt	1	Kern County		
Kimball	1	Ventura County		
Kincaid	1	Los Angeles County		
King	1	Orange County	92706	
King City	1	Monterey County	93930	
Kingdon	1	San Joaquin County		
King Salmon	1	Humboldt County		
Kings Beach	1	Placer County	96143	
Kingsburg	1	Fresno County	93631	
Kings Canyon National Park	2	Fresno County	93633	
Kings Canyon National Park	2	Tulare County	93633	
Kings Park	1	Kings County		
Kingsville	1	El Dorado County		
Kingvale	1	Nevada County	95728	
Kinneloa Mesa	1	Los Angeles County	99107	
Kinyon	1	Siskiyou County		
Kirkville	1	Sutter County	95645	
Kirkwood	1	Alpine County	95646	
Kirkwood	1	Glenn County		
Kirkwood	1	Tehama County	96021	
Kiska	1	Tehama County		
Kismet	1	Madera County		
Kiva Beach	1	El Dorado County		
Klamath	1	Del Norte County	95548	
Klamath Air Force Station	1	Del Norte County	95548	
Klamath Glen	1	Del Norte County	95548	
Klamath River	1	Siskiyou County	96050	
Klau	1	San Luis Obispo County	93446	
Klinefelter	1	San Bernardino County		
Klondike	1	San Bernardino County		
Kneeland	1	Humboldt County	95549	
Knightsen	1	Contra Costa County	94548	
Knights Ferry	1	Stanislaus County	95361	
Knights Landing	1	Yolo County	95645	
Knob	1	Shasta County	96001	
Knowles	1	Madera County	93653	
Knowles Corner	1	Sonoma County		
Knowles Junction	1	Madera County		
Knoxville	1	Napa County		
Kohler	1	Alameda County		
Komandorski Village	1	Alameda County	94568	
Korbel	1	Humboldt County	95550	
Korbel	1	Sonoma County		
Korblex	1	Humboldt County		
Kramer Hills	1	San Bernardino County		
Kramer Junction	1	San Bernardino County	93516	
Krug	1	Napa County	94574	
Kyburz	1	El Dorado County	95720	
