= Previn =

Previn is a surname that can refer to:

- Alicia Previn – American violinist, songwriter, recording artist and author; daughter of André Previn and Betty Bennett
- André Previn (1929–2019) – German-born American pianist, conductor, and composer
- Charles Previn (1888–1973) – American film composer
- Claudia Previn - American singer, musician, actress, editor and graphic artist; daughter of André Previn and Betty Bennett
- Dory Previn (1925–2012) – American lyricist, singer-songwriter and poet; second wife of André Previn
- Soon-Yi Previn (born 1970) – adopted daughter of Mia Farrow and André Previn; married to director Woody Allen
