= Eastwood Creek =

Coleman Creek

Location
- Country: United States
- State: California
- Region: San Diego County

Physical characteristics
- Source: source
  - location: on the north slope of the gold hill north of Julian, near to the Owens Mine., San Diego County
  - coordinates: 33°5′7″N 116°36′10″W
  - elevation: 4,375 ft (1,334 m)
- Mouth: mouth
  - location: at its confluence with Coleman Creek northwest of Julian., San Diego County
  - coordinates: 33°4′55″N 116°37′20″W
  - elevation: 3,950 ft (1,200 m)

Basin features
- River system: Coleman Creek

Eastwood Creek in San Diego County, California, is a tributary of Coleman Creek that arises in the Cuyamaca Mountains, at the north face of the gold bearing mountain north of Julian . From the source Eastwood Creek descends northwesterly a short distance, then turns southwest down a canyon to its confluence with Coleman Creek, just below the site of Branson City.

== History ==
Site of placer mining and mining camps along its banks from late 1869 into the early 1870s, Eastwood Creek was named for the mining town site Eastwood that Joseph Stancliff planned northwest of Julian, but which failed to thrive, similarly to Branson City. Eastwood gave its name to the creek and a nearby hill.
