= James Hubbell (artist) =

American architect (1931–2024)

- Born: October 23, 1931; Mineola, New York, U.S.
- Died: May 17, 2024 (aged 92); Chula Vista, California, U.S.
- Education: Cranbrook Academy of Art (1954–1956); Whitney Art School (1952); Choate School (1950)
- Known for: Sculpture, architecture, stained glass
- Notable work: Nature forms, architecture
- Movement: Arts and Crafts movement, German Expressionist architecture

James Hubbell (October 23, 1931 – May 17, 2024) was an American visual artist, architectural designer, painter, sculptor, stained-glass designer and founder of the Ilan-Lael Foundation who lived in Santa Ysabel, California. He was best known for designing and building organic-style structures that have been referred to as "hobbit houses", with one such example being his collaboration with Kendrick Bangs Kellogg on the Onion House in Holualoa, Hawaii. Pacific Rim Park on San Diego's Shelter Island, is the site where James Hubbell's Final Tribute and 3rd Annual Friendship Walk was held on August 24, 2024.

== Early life and education ==
While he was born in Mineola, New York, his family soon moved to Connecticut and various other places through his upbringing, with Hubbell attending 13 schools in the first 12 years of his grade-school and junior-high education.

Hubbell was influenced at an early age when a maternal aunt married into the Findlay family, who owned an art gallery in Kansas and two in New York City that specialized in American Western painters. While in high school, Hubbell collected pictures of horses and began drawing them.

Hubbell studied design and painting in 1951 for a year at the Whitney Art School in New Haven, Connecticut, until he was drafted into the U.S. Army, where he served in Korea in Headquarters Company and Troop Information Education, making posters and charts. After returning from the Army, he studied painting and sculpture at the Cranbrook Academy of Art in Michigan, but he did not graduate.

== Career ==
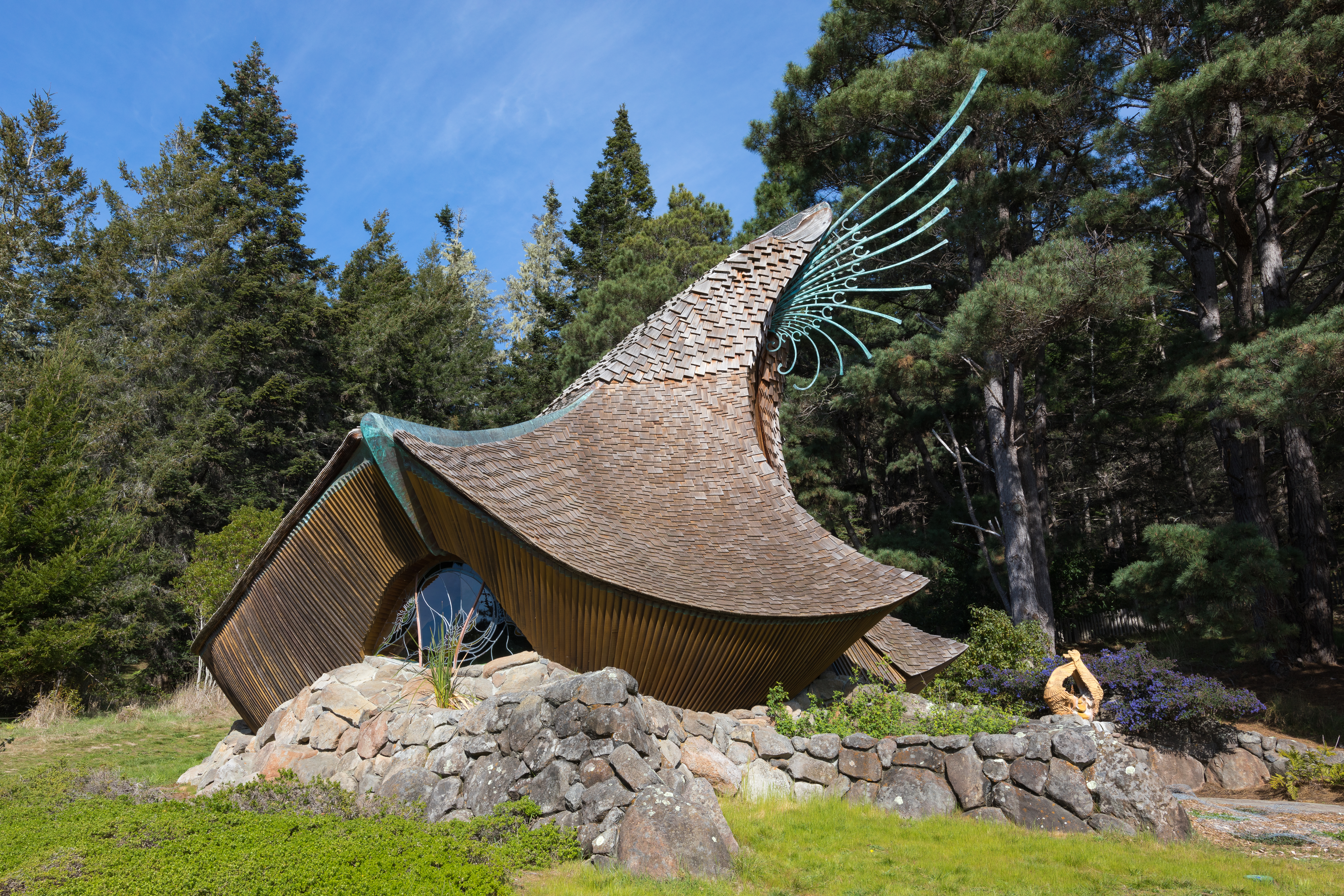
Sea Ranch Chapel

Hubbell produced hand-crafted doors, stained-glass windows, gates, and sculpture using wood, stone, metal, glass and clay. His art and architecture were installed in homes, schools, gardens, pavilions, nature centers, churches, monasteries, a sorority house, museums and peace parks in California, Mexico, and worldwide. His art studio sat on a 40-acre ranch in Wynola, a community in Julian, California. During the 1950s and 1960s, Hubbell used natural, local materials to design Hobbit-like structures that became his family's compound.

From 1954 until his death in 1983, Jim worked closely with Sim Bruce Richards, a prominent local architect in San Diego County. In 1960, Richards built "The Wishing Well Hotel" in Rancho Santa Fe, California for Hubbell's mother.

Hubbell was a member of the Julian Arts Guild. His artwork is shown at the Santa Ysabel Art Gallery in the Hubbell Room.

== Personal life ==
Hubbell married Anne Stewart in 1958, and soon after, the couple purchased their Wynola, CA property. They had four sons, for whom they built a separate structure, titled The Boys' House. In 2003 as a result of the Cedar Fire, the couple lost their home and Hubbell's studio, and other outbuildings located on the property. All were rebuilt, and they continued to expand in the years following.

Hubbell died in Chula Vista, California, on May 17, 2024, at the age of 92.

== Projects that James Hubbell worked on in the California and Mexico areas ==
- Alpine Library (stained glass art piece), Alpine, CA
- All Souls Episcopal Church (windows), Point Loma in San Diego, California
- Briercrest Park, La Mesa, CA
- Cal Western University, Rohr Hall (sculpture), San Diego, California
- Camp Stevens Chapel, Julian, CA
- Community United Methodist Church of Julian, Julian, CA
- Crest Nature Center, Crest, CA
- Davidson Residence (1972) in Alpine, CA
- Del Mar Library ("A River of Time" bronze and redwood sculpture), Del Mar, CA
- Elfin Forest Recreational Reserve, Escondido, CA
- Trinity Episcopal Church Fountain Escondido, CA (1989)
- Fallbrook Library (Poet's Patio and mosaic entry), Fallbrook, CA
- Glorietta Bay Fountain & Sculpture, Coronado, CA
- Greenery, The (1972), 4475 Mission Boulevard, Pacific Beach in San Diego, California
- Hubbell, James & Anne Residence & Studios (1958 – 1965 + later additions), Wynola, CA
- Ilan-Lael residence and studios, Santa Ysabel, CA
- Julian Library (interior gate of iron, bronze and stained glass), Julian, CA
- Kumiai Museum, Tecate, Baja California, Mexico
- Lakeside River Park, Lakeside, CA
- National City Library (windows), National City, CA
- Pacific Rim Park, Tijuana, B.C. Mexico
- Pearl of the Pacific, and Pacific Rim Park, Shelter Island in San Diego, CA
- Pt. Loma Nazarene (details) (1962) in San Diego, California
- Rainbow Hill House (1991) in Julian, CA
- Ramona Library (Laurel Passage stained glass window), Ramona, CA
- Rancho La Puerta Resort and Spa, Tecate, Baja California, Mexico
- San Diego Botanic Garden (sculpture), Encinitas, CA
- San Diego County Superior Court (Vista Courthouse Façade), Vista, CA
- Sea Ranch Chapel, Sea Ranch, CA
- Sharp Grossmont Healthcare Courtyard (Moving Circles Fountain), La Mesa, CA
- St. Andrews Episcopal Church (windows) (1960), Pacific Beach in San Diego, California
- St. Catherine Laboure Catholic Church (sculpture) (1965), San Diego, California
- St. Leo's Catholic Church (sculpture) (1965), Solana Beach, CA
- Sunshine Elementary Playground (1962), Clairemont, in San Diego, California
- Triton Restaurant in Cardiff-by-the-Sea, Encinitas, CA
- University Christian Church (windows) (1962)
- Volcan Mountain Reserve
- Vint House #2 (1983) in Del Mar, CA
- Wishing Well Hotel renovation (1962) in Rancho Santa Fe, CA

== Ilan-Lael Foundation ==
In 1983, James and wife Anne created the Ilan-Lael Foundation. From 1994, Hubbell led international teams of architectural students in building friendship-themed public parks on the coasts of San Diego, Tijuana, Russia, the Philippines, South Korea, Taiwan and, later in 2018, China, through the Ilan-Lael Foundation, an arts education foundation.

In 2008, the Ilan-Lael property received historic designation, and served as the headquarters for the Ilan-Lael Foundation.

== Awards ==
In 2019, the San Diego County board of directors presented Hubbell with the "Peacemaker of the Year Award" for his international work on building friendship-themed public parks.
