= Spencer Valley =

Valley in California, United States

Coordinates: 33°5′16″N 116°38′43″W

Spencer Valley, originally known as Coleman Valley in the 19th century, is a mountain valley located in San Diego County, California, at an elevation of 3605 ft. It lies east of the Santa Ysabel Valley and northwest of the town of Julian in the Cuyamaca Mountains. It is drained by Baily Creek which runs down the valley from the north to its confluence with Coleman Creek in the south end of the valley. Its tributary from the east, Jim Green Creek meets Baily Creek just before its confluence with Coleman Creek, that runs from east to west down from Julian to the headwaters of the San Diego River. The unincorporated community of Wynola lies along State Highway 78, in the middle of the valley.
