= A. E. Coleman =

A. E. "Fred" Coleman was an American former slave credited with discovering gold in Julian, California, and thus launching a gold rush in that area.

Coleman was employed as cattle herder and living in the Julian area with his Kumeyaay wife Maria Jesusa Anej and eleven children. In the winter of 1869, Coleman, while watering his horse in a small creek, noticed flecks of gold in the stream. Coleman had previously worked in the gold fields of Northern California. Within weeks more than 800 prospectors flooded into what was named the Coleman Mining District. Coleman was elected its recorder.

In present-day Julian, the creek where the gold was discovered has been named Coleman Creek although it is overrun by brambles and trees and essentially hidden from view. Coleman Circle, a nearby street, is also named after A.E. Coleman.

Coleman was one of several African Americans who made significant contributions to early "gold rush" Julian. Other pioneering African Americans from the area include Albert and Margaret Robinson, founders of the Robinson Hotel, and America Newton.
