= Don Weeke =

American artist

- Born: Donald Weeke; 1947 (age 78–79); Addieville, Illinois, U.S.
- Education: Studied under basket weaver Misti Washington
- Known for: Gourd and weaving work
- Movement: Arts and Crafts movement

Don Weeke (born 1947) is an American fiber and gourd artist from Addieville, Illinois best known for combining basketry with gourds using natural materials from the environment. His work is regularly on display nationally at galleries and has been featured in art books, including Fiberarts Design Book 7, The Complete Book of Gourd Craft, and 500 Baskets.

== Early life and education ==
Weeke grew up in a small farming community in southern Illinois. His first exposure to art were the quilts his grandmother sewed.

He received a bachelor's in mathematics and computer science from the University of Illinois Urbana-Champaign in 1969 and a master's degree in social work in 1976 from San Diego State University.

== Artwork ==
Weeke began basket weaving and teaching workshops in 1978 after studying natural basket weaving from weaver Misti Washington. He expanded his career and began working with gourds after collecting willow in a stream bed and noticing interesting shapes in a nearby field, which launched his gourd weaving career that integrated gourd and basketry techniques, including those used by indigenous cultures.

He uses fibers native to the San Diego County area he lives in, including Torrey pine needles, fronds from the king and date palm trees, willow and oak branches, and acorns from the mountains. His work utilizes both traditional and contemporary basketry techniques, and he also burns, carves and paints gourds to manipulate the surfaces. He also gives art workshops and speaks in different cities, which he first began doing in 1986 in Telluride, Colorado.

=== Shows ===
Weeke's art has shown in museums and galleries nationally, including a two-month show at the Racine Art Museum titled Basketworks: The Cotsen Contemporary American Basket Collection, from September 2008 to January 2009, The Gadfly gallery in Alexandria, Virginia, the main gallery at the Borrego Art Institute in Borrego Springs, California, 2Create Gallery in Ramona, California, and the Julian Arts Guild Gallery in Julian, California. His artwork was also included in the Words Imagined exhibit of four artists at the Rose Art Gallery in San Diego on the campus of Francis Parker School from October through December 2019 and again at the Rose Art Gallery in the Artists of Julian exhibit from February to March 2016.

Weeke was the keynote speaker in April 2012 at a two-day "Baskets and Gourds: Containers of Our Culture IV" conference in Visalia, California.

His work showed in the Juried and Invitational Basketry Exhibit at Arrowmont and Fuller Craft Museum in Brockton, Massachusetts in October 2013.

The Los Angeles Times described his work, while on display at the Wignall Museum of Contemporary Art in Cucamonga, California, as "sculptural works" that "blend traditional basketry techniques and contemporary materials.

As early as 1982, his work showed in the Art Barn art gallery at Middle Tennessee State University in Murfreesboro, Tennessee. Weeke has also participated in the annual Gourd Fine Art Show at the Art Center of Fallbrook, which each year runs for a month.

=== Awards ===
Weeke was awarded a 1979 Purchase Award from the annual Fourth Avenue Street Fair sponsored by the Fourth Avenue Merchants' Association in Tucson, Arizona for his potato basket made of olive and palm.

== Personal life ==
He lives in Julian, California, a mountain community and former mining town in San Diego County, where he is a member of the Julian Arts Guild.
