= Whale Mountain =

Whale Mountain may refer to:

- Whale Mountain (San Bernardino County, California)
- Whale Mountain (San Diego County, California)

== See also ==
- Blue Whale Mountain
