= Coleman Creek (San Diego County) =

Location
- Country: United States
- State: California
- Region: San Diego County

Physical characteristics
- Source: source
  - location: on the west slope of the Cuyamaca Mountains., San Diego County
  - coordinates: 33°3′52″N 116°34′33″W
  - elevation: 4,380 ft (1,340 m)
- Mouth: mouth
  - location: at its confluence with San Diego River southeast of Santa Ysabel., San Diego County
  - coordinates: 33°5′52″N 116°39′43″W
  - elevation: 3,162 ft (964 m)

Basin features
- River system: San Diego River
- Tributaries
  - left: Baily Creek, Eastwood Creek

Coleman Creek is a tributary of the San Diego River in San Diego County, California, that arises at the top of the valley running southeasterly from Julian, at a saddle between two ridges of the Cuyamaca Mountains just south of Kentwood-In-The-Pines. From there, Coleman Creek descends northwesterly down the valley to Julian, where it turns west, descending its canyon northwesterly through the site of Branson City, past the mouth of its tributary Eastwood Creek on the north, passing through the south end of Spencer Valley, past the mouth of its tributary Baily Creek on the north, then descending northwest down Quanai Canyon to its confluence with the San Diego River.

== History ==
Coleman Creek was named for Black pioneer A. E. Coleman, who discovered gold in its waters in 1869, which led to the gold rush to the Cuyamaca Mountains and the founding of the gold mining camps of Coleman City, Branson City, Eastwood and the town of Julian.
