= Betty Bennett =

Betty Bennett may refer to:

- Betty T. Bennett (1935–2006), American professor of literature
- Betty Bennett (singer) (1921–2020), American jazz singer
