= Julian Arts Guild =

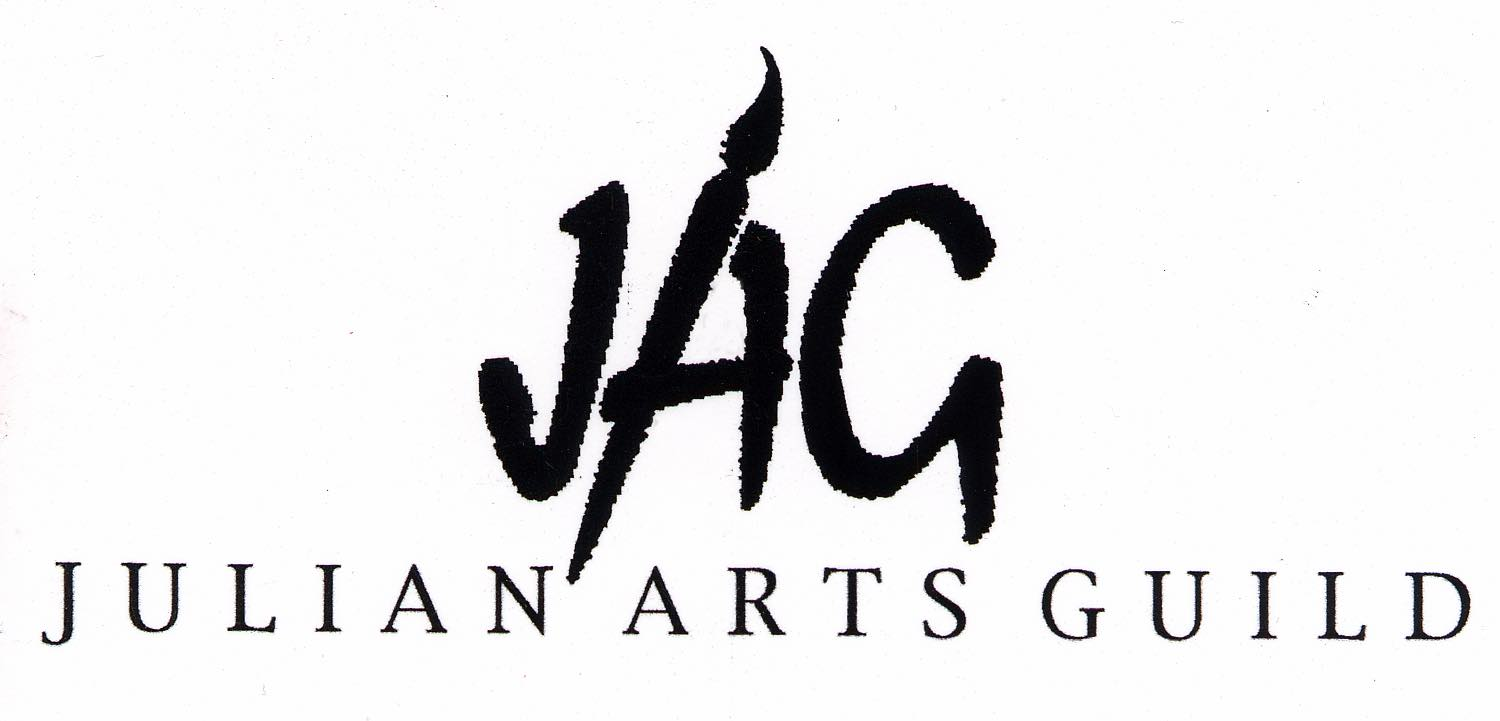
- Julian Arts Guild logo
- Formation: 1971; 55 years ago
- Registration no.: C4257812
- Legal status: Charity
- Purpose: To support creative interests in the arts for the community at large
- Headquarters: Julian, California United States
- Region served: Cuyamaca, California
- Members: 40+
- Activities: Education; Events; Exhibitions
- Website: julianartsguild.wordpress.com

Julian Arts Guild is a nonprofit organization founded in 1971 to promote the arts in the former mining town of Julian, CA, in the mountains of San Diego County, California. The group's Julian Arts Guild Gallery, which opened in 2017 in the Julian Historic District, showcases members' artwork. The Guild each year holds a studio arts tour and two art exhibitions of paintings, drawings, photography, gourd and basketry art, weaving, and jewelry.

== Julian Arts Guild Gallery ==
The Julian Arts Guild opened an art gallery, named the Julian Arts Guild Gallery, with a mid-October 2017 opening and exhibition on B Street in downtown Julian, where local artists who are members of the Guild exhibit their artworks.

== History ==
In 1965, Julian artists participated in an art and wildflower show, organized by local artist Dawn Kirkman, collaborating with the Julian Woman’s Club. The Julian Arts Guild was later formally established in 1971. It celebrated its 50th anniversary in 2021 with its annual art shows. Stan Cornette was the Guild's first president, and he and co-founder Dorothy Mushet remain charter members. A longtime member included the late artist and architect James Hubbell, known for his hobbit-like architecture, until his May 2024 death. Member Linda Todd-Limón, a photographer, runs the gallery and organizes the annual art shows, with artist Bonnie Gendron as its president.

Artists who exhibited their work at the Guild's 2021 50th anniversary art show included watercolor painter Jane Barnes, graphic artist Mila Feldblum, weaver Anne Garcia, painter Gendron, painter Rex Harrison, photographer Cindy Hedgecock, Marilyn Kozlow, painter Randa Lake, painter Beryl Warnes, painter Rebecca Morales, oil painter Kiki Munshi, jewelry maker and painter Barbara Nigro, painter Bettie Rikansrud, author Cathy Scott, photographer Todd-Limón, basket and gourd weaver Don Weeke, singer/actress Claudia Previn and photographer Kevin Wixom.

The Julian Journal described the arts guild's goal, to "promote the arts in backcountry" as "the driving force behind many artistic ventures in Julian," including "seasonal art exhibitions in Julian Town Hall, or the monthly meetings that offer free workshops, demonstrations and speakers, or open art studio events."

=== Poetry on the Mountain ===
In May 2024, the Guild hosted United States Poet Laureate Ada Limón to speak at its first Poetry on the Mountain event, held at Julian Union High School Little Theatre in Julian, CA, where her father Ken Limón and stepmother Linda Todd Limón live.

== Funding ==
The organization receives deductible donations from the public, plus member dues, proceeds from the gallery, and annual funds from San Diego County through the Transportation Occupancy Tax (TOT), referred to as Community Enhancement bonds.

== Events ==
In May 2024, the Julian Arts Guild featured Poet Laureate of the United States Ada Limón at its Poetry on the Mountain event at Julian High School's Little Theater. Limón is the 24th U.S. poet laureate and the first Latina in that position.

== Honorary life members ==
- James Hubbell
- Dorothy Mushet
