= Iggy Shevak =

American jazz double bassist (1918–1985)

- Born: Robert Coleman Shevak; October 15, 1918
- Died: June 7, 1985 (aged 66)
- Genre: Jazz
- Occupation: Musician
- Instrument: Double bass
- Years active: 1930s
- Spouse: Betty Bennett

Robert Coleman Shevak (October 15, 1918 – June 7, 1985), better known as Iggy Shevak, was an American jazz bassist who performed with several leading jazz figures in the 1940s and 1950s. Shevak is also credited on recordings with variations of his name, such as Robert Shevak, Bob Shevak, Roger Shevak, Iggy Shevack, and Richard Shevak.

After playing in bands in New York in the late 1930s and early 1940s, Shevak moved to Los Angeles in the late 1940s.

Shevak was married to the singer Betty Bennett, who later joined him in Claude Thornhill's band before they both moved on to join Alvino Rey's band.

== New York ==
In April 1939, he was recording with a band led by Jack Jenney, backing vocalist Louise Tobin, with Hugo Winterhalter, Peanuts Hucko, and Bunny Bardach, among others. In September that same year, he was a member of a band comprising a slightly different lineup, but again with Jenney, Winterhalter, Hucko, and Bardach. In July 1941, he recorded with Sonny Dunham's band, featuring Uan Rasey, Pete Candoli, Paul Montgomery, and George Fay, among others, and again in March 1942, with a similar lineup but including Kai Winding.

In May 1945, he recorded with Georgie Auld's orchestra, comprising Al Porcino, Serge Chaloff, Joe Albany, Turk Van Lake, Stan Levey, among others, and with Tadd Dameron as arranger. In December 1945 or January 1946, he recorded with Shorty Rogers, Kai Winding, Shorty Allen, Stan Getz, and Shelly Manne for Savoy Records.

In June 1946, he recorded with the Claude Thornhill band that included his wife, Betty Bennett, on vocals.

== Los Angeles ==
In October 1948, he recorded as a member of the Teddy Edwards Quintet, with Herbie Harper (trombone), Hampton Hawes (piano), and Roy Porter (drums). In September 1949, he recorded again as a member of Sonny Criss's band, with Chuck Thompson on drums, and again with Hampton Hawes.

In 1954, he was a member, with Barney Kessel, of Geordie Hormel's trio.
