= Julian Gold Rush Hotel =

- U.S. National Register of Historic Places
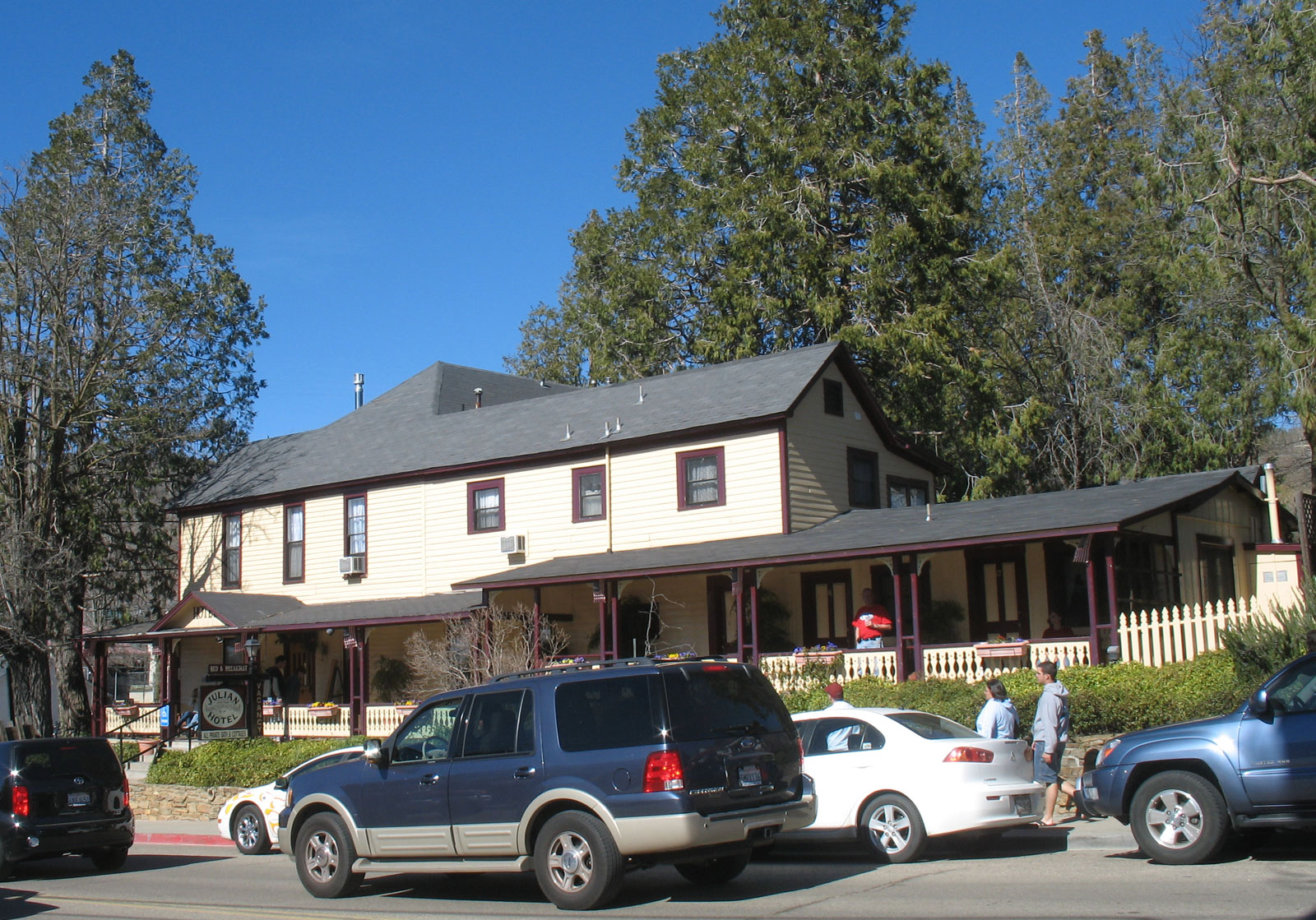
- Hotel in 2008

- Location within San Diego County, California Location within California Location within the United States
- Location: 2032 Main St., Julian, California
- Coordinates: 33°4′40″N 116°36′1″W
- Area: 0.2 acres (0.081 ha)
- Built: 1897
- Architect: Wellington, C.R.; Blanc, F.L.
- NRHP reference No.: 78000747
- Added to NRHP: June 23, 1978

The Julian Gold Rush Hotel formerly known as Robinson Hotel, is located in the former mining town of Julian, California, United States. It was one of the first businesses in San Diego County owned and operated by African Americans.

== History ==
Albert Robinson and Margaret Tull Robinson started, in 1887, a business originally named the Robinson Restaurant and Bakery. The business quickly became popular during the relatively brief gold rush that Julian experienced. Their hotel, which is still in operation, is the oldest continuing operating hotel in Southern California. The original hotel was constructed in 1897, with the bakery-restaurant structure razed to make room for the hotel. During construction, Albert planted cedar and locust trees around the hotel, which survive to the present day.

The hotel has remained in business for over a hundred years and has repeatedly been expanded and improved, with air conditioning being a major new improvement added in the 21st century. The historically restored 16-room building is currently known as the Julian Gold Rush Hotel.

Albert was a former slave who came to Julian with his former slave owner. During the gold rush days of Julian, most of San Diego County's African Americans lived in remote Julian, rather than the city of San Diego. Another influential black pioneer of the time, and a friend of the Robinsons, was America Newton, also a former slave and laundress during the town's gold rush days.

Albert and Margaret met in Julian; Albert being employed at the time as a cook. They were married in the late 1880s. Albert died on June 10, 1915. Margaret sold the hotel in 1921.

The hotel is listed in the National Register of Historic Places.
