= Donald Pike =

American judge

- Born: June 9, 1924; Nebraska
- Died: 9 June 2008 (aged 84); Los Angeles, California
- Education: McGeorge School of Law; San Fernando Valley College of Law
- Occupations: Lawyer; judge

Donald Wayne Pike (June 9, 1924 – June 9, 2008) was a lawyer who was appointed as a Los Angeles County Superior Court Commissioner, seated on the bench in 1973 until the mid-1990s. Pike is best known for graduating from law school and becoming a judge without ever having attended college.

== Biography ==
Born in Nebraska to Harold and Lillian Pike, Donald Pike's family migrated as farmhands, first to Oregon, then to Julian and Ramona, California mountain communities east of San Diego, where the family of nine children helped support the family by working in the corn fields. Pike dropped out of school and left home at age 14 to live in a boarding house while continuing to work as a farm laborer, then as a stock boy in a department store and, at one point, as a Western Union messenger boy. According to the Los Angeles Daily Journal, he became a millionaire in his 60s from land investments.

During World War II, at age 18, he joined the United States Merchant Marine, enlisting as an Ordinary Seaman, sailing on the S.S. J. Maurice Thompson, S.S. Alexander Lillington and S.S. Robert Toombs during two stints overseas. He was first released from active duty, with the rank of Quartermaster Third Class, in 1942. He rejoined the Merchant Marine in 1943 and was officially discharged in 1944.

== Education ==
Pike earned his high school equivalency diploma at age 26. Later, he attended law school without first attending college. He passed a college equivalency test allowed at the time by the State Bar of California. He then enrolled at McGeorge School of Law in Sacramento at night while delivering Dad's Root Beer during the day. In July 1965, while attending law school, Pike formally withdrew his membership in good standing from the Teamsters union, which he needed to work as a truck driver delivering root beer. After transferring to the San Fernando Valley College of Law, he was awarded a Bachelor of Laws degree in 1967.

== Career ==
Pike passed the California State Bar examination his first try and was admitted as a lawyer in June 1967. He was appointed as a commissioner in Los Angeles Superior Court, Family Law Division, from 1973 until the mid-1990s. The Daily Journal profiled Pike in a January 5, 1982 article while he sat on the bench. In the mid-1970s, he taught children's rights at University of La Verne College of Law and psychology and the law at Claremont Graduate University.

The Daily Journal, in its obituary about Pike, described his impoverished beginnings in a Nebraska family of nine children as a "Grapes of Wrath-esque exodus to California and his early job as a child working as a farm laborer. The paper titled the article "Jurist Fought for Gay Rights Before it was Popular." While a lawyer in private practice, Pike drafted contracts for gay men and women "that emulated the rights of married couples," the paper wrote. The Daily Journal also described Pike's work for gay rights as groundbreaking and "three decades before it was fashionable."

== Personal life ==
Pike was an avid sailor and boating enthusiast throughout his life. He lived in Granada Hills, California. He had two daughters, Sharon Lawrence and Victoria Pynchon, with his first wife, Lois Borden. His youngest daughter Victoria, also an attorney in Los Angeles, practices private dispute resolution.
