= Coleman City, California =

Coleman City Emily City
- Ghost town
- Location in California Coleman City (southern California) Coleman City (California) Coleman City (the United States)
- Coordinates: 33°05′10″N 116°38′42″W
- Country: United States
- State: California
- County: San Diego County
- Established: 1870
- Elevation: 3,601 ft (1,098 m)

Coleman City, also called Emily City, is a ghost town in San Diego County, California. It lies at an elevation of 3601 feet. It is located on State Highway 79 where it crosses Coleman Creek, about four miles west of Julian.

== History ==
Coleman City was founded in the early months of 1870 by the first placer miners who rushed to Coleman Creek, following the news of the discovery of gold there by A. E. Coleman who first discovered gold there in January 1870. Coleman, with earlier experience in the gold camps in Northern California, subsequently formed the Coleman Mining District and was its recorder. He also established the Emily City mining town site. This mining camp, later renamed Coleman City in his honor, served the placer gold miners along Coleman Creek in the Coleman Mining District. The San Diego Union reported on February 17, 1870, that the camp had 75 miners inhabiting it. On March 17, following the discovery of the Washington Mine, it reported Coleman City consisted of a dozen tents with a population of 150 men, many sleeping on the ground in the open.

After the discovery of the lode gold deposits near Julian the Julian Mining District was formed and with the depletion of the placer deposits, Coleman City was abandoned.
