= Onion House =

Hand-built house in Holualoa, Hawaii, United States

Coordinates: 19°36′22″N 155°57′43″W

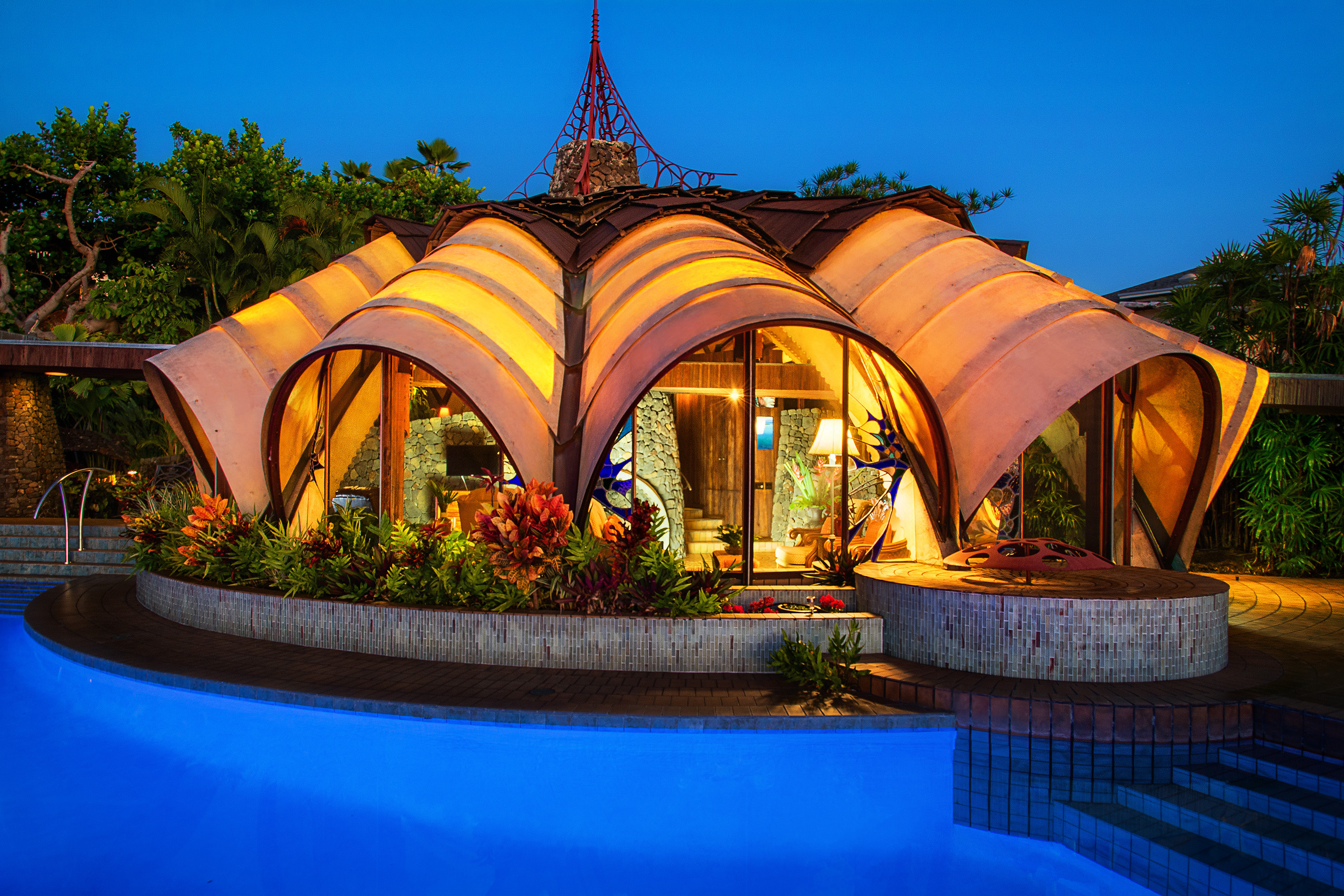
Glowing like a lantern- Onion House main structure

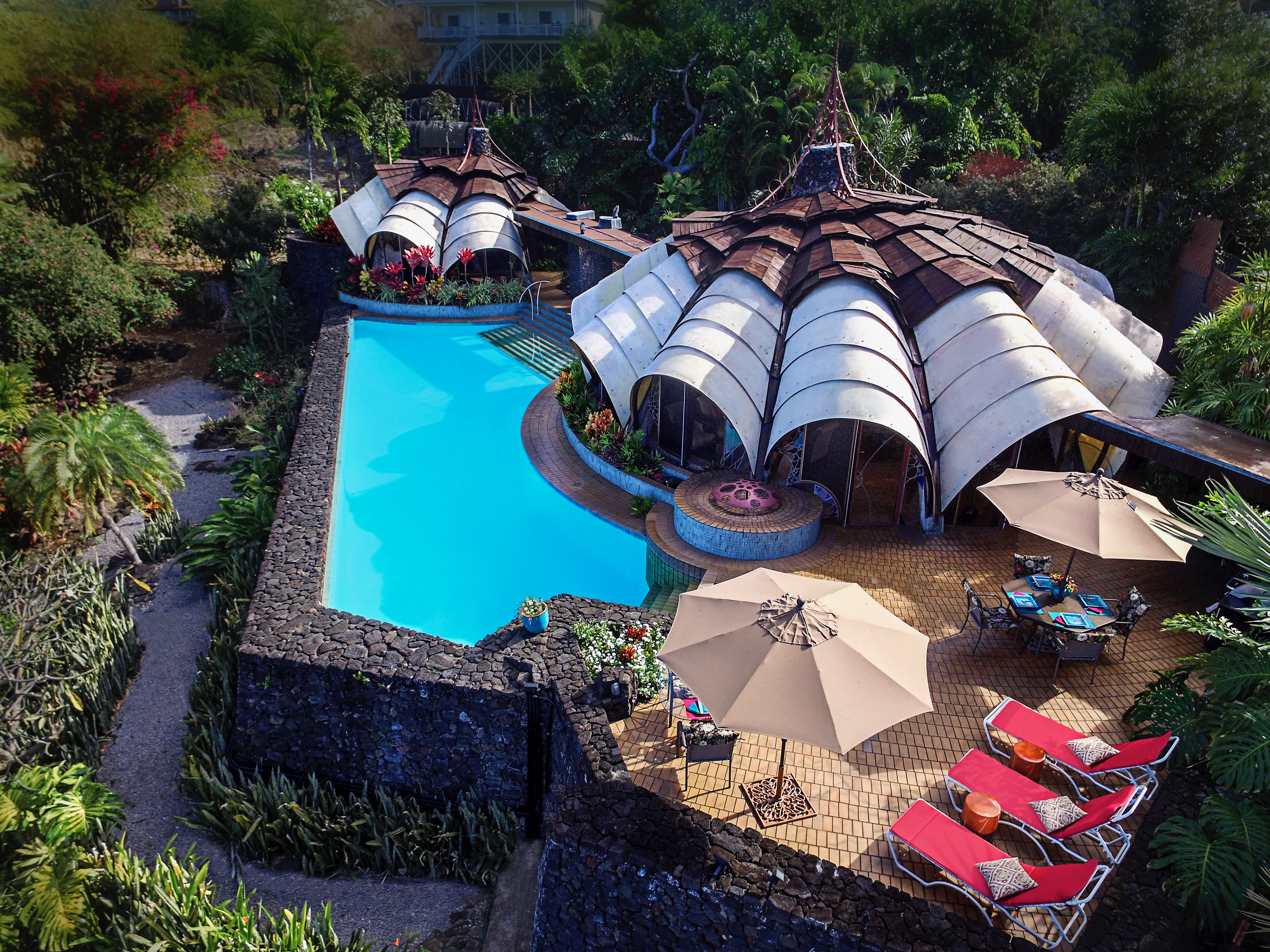
Overhead view- Onion House Hawaii

The Onion House is an innovative home commissioned by Elizabeth McCormick von Beck, member of the McCormick family, and designed and hand-built by American architect Kendrick Bangs Kellogg, in Holualoa, Hawaii, (near Kailua-Kona) in 1962-1963.

With the address of 77-6411 Nalani St, Kailua-kona Hawaii, it is an example of organic architecture, or metaphoric architecture. The arched roof panels resemble a shell, or an onion, while the lava rock walls reference ancient Hawaiian temples, or heiau, which are found along the Kona coast. The roof panels are translucent like onion skin, transmitting sunlight into the house during the day and glowing at night. With no exterior walls, the outdoors are integrated with the living areas, separated only by screen or stained glass. A 70-foot pool wraps around the two main structures.

Elizabeth McCormick von Beck, niece to Willoughby M. McCormick, founder of McCormick & Company, commissioned Kellogg to design the home, when he was in his mid-twenties. When they could not find a contractor willing to attempt the project, Kellogg moved to Hawaii to construct it himself. Fellow architect James Hubbell collaborated with Kellogg on construction of the home, with Hubbell creating 29 stained glass windows and a mosaic tile dining table. William Slatton created metal-work details throughout the home, including the entrance gate and the spires topping the three structures.

The roofs of the two main structures are supported by a series of cast-in-place concrete arches, radiating out from a central fireplace in each building. Translucent panels made of fiberglass, called Alsynite, curve between each concrete arch. These roofs are crowned with hand-cut redwood shingles, topped by steel spires.

Massive lava rock walls form a high terrace overlooking the ocean. These walls flow uninterrupted from the outside to the interior, right through the glass and screen walls. These rock walls are thicker at the bottom, slanting upward like the walls of Hawaiian temples, or heiau. This very site-specific architecture works in the gentle climate of Kona, where trade winds are buffered by Mount Hualalai, and temperatures range between 70-80 degrees Fahrenheit.

This was the third home Kellogg designed, and one of his best-known buildings. While Kellogg's architectural vision was heavily influenced by Frank Lloyd Wright, Kellogg called the Onion house his 'breakaway house', taking departure from the horizontal planes that characterized much of Wright's work. Kellogg's aesthetic has been described as "an architecture so full of life that it seems to breathe."

In 1984, the home was purchased by the original owner's niece, Beth McCormick, who renovated the home over a period of 34 years. In 2017, the home was sold, with Beth remaining involved providing advice and architectural guidance.

Previous to the sale in 2000, Beth McCormick began sharing the Onion House with the public as a vacation rental property, and it remains available for guests to stay in.
