= Kendrick Bangs Kellogg =

American architect (1934–2024)

Kendrick Bangs Kellogg (1934 – February 16, 2024) was an American architect. An innovator of organic architecture, Kellogg built a wide assortment of distinctive buildings. Homes include the Lotus House, Wingsweep, the High Desert house, and the Onion House. Public buildings include the Hoshino Wedding Chapel in Japan and Charthouse restaurants.

== Biography ==
Kendrick Bangs Kellogg was born in 1934 in San Diego, California, named for John Kendrick Bangs. Kellogg is related to Frederick Law Olmsted, "The Father of Landscape Architecture" (of the 1800s), who was a cousin to Kellogg's grandfather. Olmsted's landscape designs were curvilinear and irregular, a significant break from the formal symmetrical patterns of the time, a practice which Kellogg saw himself continuing.

Kellogg studied for five years at San Diego State University, the University of Colorado, the University of Southern California, and the University of California, Berkeley. In 1955 he met Frank Lloyd Wright, and the brief meeting provided an inspiration. Kellogg completed his math and engineering courses and left Berkeley without a degree. His first design was a house in Mission Beach area of San Diego in 1957. By 1964, he had obtained his California architectural license and designed and built five residences.

Kellogg's architecture does not fit neatly into the same category as Frank Lloyd Wright, Bruce Goff, Bart Prince, or other organic architects. Kellogg's architecture is unique to Kellogg. His work was described as "the Sydney Opera House meets Stonehenge".

Like Goff, Wright, and many other architects, Kellogg's buildings are studies of layered, segmented, and unfolding space. A big difference between Goff and Kellogg involves the feeling of permanence and impermanence in their architecture. Most of Goff 's clients had moderate incomes, so he used inexpensive materials. Thirty years later, some of his art is popping apart.

Kellogg was more fortunate; many of his clients were better-heeled. It is said that Kellogg houses feel heavy, firmly connected to their foundations. The beams and radiating members are said to be reminiscent of the stout keels and ribs in ships designed to weather storms and the interior structures, of spinal columns that supported the weight of whales or dinosaurs.

Kellogg said: "To realize truly creative architecture you need clients with the vision and imagination to make the most of any site. Great clients are those who allow an architect the latitude to give them what they didn't know they wanted until they have it! They are willing to risk being unique. The Hoshino Wedding Chapel in Japan is a good example, built for a client with a great sense of quality and beauty, and a desire to circumvent the restrictions of society. This much used rock and concrete chapel is a successful and popular example of architecture built for future generations."

Kellogg was also a community planner responsible for instituting, in San Diego, the only planned district ordinance allowing compatible neighborhood character without inhibiting the diversity of any architectural style.

His work has been published in the United States, France, Germany and Japan.

Kellogg died in San Diego, on February 16, 2024, at the age of 89. His archives were donated to Art, Design and Architecture Museum at the University of California, Santa Barbara.

== Groundbreaking building designs ==
Kellogg designed and engineered "more than a dozen startling residences, including the Surfer House in La Jolla and the Onion House in Kona, Hawaii." His distinctive aesthetic has been described as "an architecture so full of life that it seems to breathe."

The curvilinear architecture of Kellogg's architecture is reminiscent of the fanciful creations of Antoni Gaudi in Spain, while the central fireplaces and geometric lines are shaped by teachings of Frank Lloyd Wright.

The High Desert House in Joshua Tree, California, built by Kellogg for the artist Bev Doolittle, is formed to integrate with the immense boulders found on the site. The structure has no walls, but is formed by 26 enormous cantilevered concrete columns sunk seven feet into the bedrock. John Vugrin, the craftsman who created many of the intricate custom details, labored for two decades on the building site.

Kellogg's third design, known as the "Onion House", is an early example of dramatic mingling of light and stone unique to his designs. A landmark of organic architecture, it was constructed in Kona, Hawaii during 1961–62 for Elizabeth von Beck. Hand-built by Kellogg, with the assistance of William Slatton, the design employs translucent arching roof panels. With no outside walls, the division between interior and exterior consists of screen or stained glass. Massive lava rock walls form the central fireplaces and angled interior walls, while concrete arches radiate from the fireplaces to support the roof structures. Stained glass throughout both structures and the mosaic dining table were built by artist James Hubbell.

One of Kellogg's most celebrated works is the Hoshino Chapel in Karuizawa, Japan, which employs precast concrete arches and stone walls. It has become Japan's most popular wedding chapel.
