= Whale Mountain (San Diego County, California) =

U.S. mountain

- Location within San Diego County, California Location within California

Highest point
- Elevation: 3,043 ft (928 m) NAVD 88
- Prominence: 403 ft (123 m)
- Coordinates: 33°04′32″N 116°45′40″W

Geography
- Location: San Diego County, California, U.S.
- Parent range: Cuyamaca Mountains
- Topo map: USGS Ramona

Whale Mountain is a 3,043-foot (928 m), summit in the northwestern Cuyamaca Mountains in San Diego County, California. It is located between Ramona and Santa Ysabel, near Ballena Valley.

Ballena takes its name from the mountain, ballena being Spanish for "whale". The Spanish name was the equivalent of the Ipai word ipank which also means "whale", and which was their name for the mountain.

Whale Mountain is known for being desert-like and containing many desert plants and animals, such as cacti.
