= Kentwood-In-The-Pines, California =

Unincorporated community in California, United States

Kentwood-In-The-Pines
- Unincorporated community
- Location in California Kentwood-In-The-Pines (the United States)
- Coordinates: 33°04′18″N 116°34′32″W
- Country: United States
- State: California
- County: San Diego
- Elevation: 4,308 ft (1,313 m)

Kentwood-In-The-Pines is an unincorporated community, 0.8 miles (1.3 km) east-southeast of Julian in San Diego County, California.

Water service is provided by the Majestic Pines Community Services District, a public water agency that also serves the neighboring community of Whispering Pines.
