= Julian Theater Company =

American theatre company

- Formation: 1980; 46 years ago
- Type: Theatre group
- Purpose: Theatre company
- Location: Julian, California
- Artistic director: Scott Kinney
- Website: visitjulian.com/to-see-do/entertainment/#!biz/id/5ecfe28cf9dd97235b7f1a8f

Julian Theater Company is an American theatre company based in Julian, California, a mountain community, historic district and mining town in San Diego County, California. The company stages live productions to promote arts and entertainment for the community. It was co-founded in 1980 by husband and wife Scott and Debra Kinney and originally known as the Pine Hills Lodge Dinner Theater.

== History ==
In 1980, Scott Kinney, who had been acting and writing in Los Angeles, traveled to Julian and met Debra Bartlett at the Pine Hills Lodge bar where she worked. He moved to Julian, they married, and they began directing and producing the plays. Earlier, in 1978, Kinney appeared in Douglas Jacobs’ adaptation of A Christmas Carol at the San Diego Repertory Theatre with local actress Karen Johnson, who went on to perform under the name Whoopi Goldberg.

In 1982, the company formally became the Pine Hills Lodge Dinner Theater and staged half a dozen weekend plays a year, drawing actors from around San Diego County.

In June 1988, the company staged the sought-after Southern California premiere of American dramatist Larry Shue’s Broadway hit The Nerd at the Pine Hills Lodge Dinner Theater.

The company has since presented plays at both the Julian High School Little Theater with its 165 seats and the Julian City Hall theater with 120 seats, at times in collaboration with the East County Performing Arts Association. Performances are directed by Scott Kinney and produced by Debra Kinney. Plays have included The Music Man by Meredith Willson, as well as each winter Charles Dickens' A Christmas Carol.

Many of the plays' adaptations have been co-written by Scott Kinney, a lifelong thespian who has performed with the San Diego Repertory Theatre and the Old Globe Theatre, and Julian resident Don Winslow, a retired New York Times best-selling crime novelist.

After the 2003 Cedar Fire that killed 14 San Diego County residents plus a firefighter and destroyed 2,232 mountain homes, including the Kinneys' house, the couple took a break from the theater company to rebuild their home. Two years later, they returned with the Julian Theater Company, and to lift community spirits, staged Steel Magnolias about a small town and the friendships between six women.

Following the death of the Kinneys' youngest son, Ian, who ran the stage lights, worked the curtains and acted, they paused the company again, returning in 2016 with A Christmas Carol.

The company, after soliciting locally written play submissions, in 2020 produced its inaugural Playwright Festival with A Day in August by Jonathan Retz.

In 2022, the company assisted the East County Performing Arts Association with the stage production of Spoon River Anthology by Edgar Lee Masters at Julian Town Hall's theater. In the summer of 2023, the Julian Theater Company and East County Performing Arts Association presented The Scarlet Pimpernel, directed and staged by Kinney.

The company produced and directed The Sound of Music in July 2024 at the Julian High School's Little Theater. "One of life’s greatest gifts is to work with young artists just starting their storytelling journey," Kinney told the Julian Journal. "The Sound of Music depends on the budding skills of young actors and singers working in harmony."

== Notable productions ==
- A Christmas Carol by Charles Dickens
- Big River by William Hauptman
- Fiddler on the Roof by Jerry Bock, Sheldon Harnick and Joseph Stein
- The Foreigner by Larry Shue
- Forever Plaid by Stuart Ross
- I'm Not Rappaport by Herb Gardner
- Little Shop of Horrors by Howard Ashman
- Love Letters by A. R. Gurney
- Man of La Mancha by Dale Wasserman
- The Nerd by Larry Shue
- Paint Your Wagon by Frederick Loewe
- Play It Again, Sam (play) by Woody Allen
- Run for Your Wife (play) by Ray Cooney
- The Scarlet Pimpernel (musical) by Emma Orczy
- Spoon River Anthology by Edgar Lee Masters
- The Most Happy Fella by Frank Loesser
- The Music Man by Willson and Franklin Lacey
- The Odd Couple by Neil Simon
- The Sound of Music (Broadway play) by Rodgers and Hammerstein
