= Addieville, Illinois =

- Village
- Interactive map of Addieville, Illinois
- Location in Illinois Addieville, Illinois (the United States) Addieville, Illinois (North America)
- Coordinates: 38°23′29″N 89°29′11″W
- Country: United States
- State: Illinois
- County: Washington

Area
  - Total: 0.99 sq mi (2.57 km^{2})
  - Land: 0.99 sq mi (2.57 km^{2})
  - Water: 0 sq mi (0.00 km^{2})
- Elevation: 469 ft (143 m)

Population (2020)
  - Total: 259
  - Density: 260.9/sq mi (100.74/km^{2})
- Time zone: UTC-6 (CST)
  - Summer (DST): UTC-5 (CDT)
- ZIP code: 62214
- FIPS code: 17-00230
- GNIS ID: 2397910

Addieville is a village in Washington County, Illinois, United States. The population at the time of the 2020 census was 259.

== History ==
A post office has been in operation at Addieville since 1870. The village was named for Adele Morrison, the wife of a town promoter.

== Geography ==
According to the 2010 census, Addieville has a total area of 1.05 square miles (2.72 km^{2}), all land.

== Demographics ==
Historical population
Census	Pop.	Note	%±
1880	78		—
1890	117		50.0%
1900	190		62.4%
1910	269		41.6%
1920	280		4.1%
1930	283		1.1%
1940	272		−3.9%
1950	271		−0.4%
1960	231		−14.8%
1970	274		18.6%
1980	286		4.4%
1990	257		−10.1%
2000	267		3.9%
2010	252		−5.6%
2020	259		2.8%
U.S. Decennial Census

As of the census of 2000, there were 267 people, 107 households, and 78 families residing in the village. The population density was 253.6 inhabitants per square mile (97.9/km^{2}). There were 115 housing units at an average density of 109.2 per square mile (42.2/km^{2}). The racial makeup of the village was 98.50% White, 0.75% Native American, and 0.75% from two or more races. Hispanic or Latino of any race were 0.37% of the population.

There were 107 households, out of which 34.6% had children under the age of 18 living with them, 57.0% were married couples living together, 5.6% had a female householder with no husband present, and 26.2% were non-families. 24.3% of all households were made up of individuals, and 13.1% had someone living alone who was 65 years of age or older. The average household size was 2.50 and the average family size was 2.92.

In the village, the population was spread out, with 25.5% under the age of 18, 6.7% from 18 to 24, 35.6% from 25 to 44, 18.4% from 45 to 64, and 13.9% who were 65 years of age or older. The median age was 37 years. For every 100 females, there were 103.8 males. For every 100 females age 18 and over, there were 114.0 males.

The median income for a household in the village was $46,667, and the median income for a family was $51,875. Males had a median income of $35,625 versus $20,000 for females. The per capita income for the village was $16,415. About 1.4% of families and 2.7% of the population were below the poverty line, including 3.1% of those under the age of eighteen and 6.1% of those sixty-five or over.
