= Claudia Previn =

American singer, musician, editor, graphic artist

- Born: Claudia Page Previn; June 24, 1954 (age 72)
- Genres: Jazz, classic
- Occupations: Musician, singer, actress, editor, graphic artist
- Instrument: Guitar
- Years active: 1964–present
- Spouse: Jeffrey Stasny
- Education: University of Southern California

Claudia Page Previn Stasny (née Previn; born June 24, 1954) is an American singer, musician, actress, editor, and graphic artist.

She is the older sister of Alicia Previn, and the eldest daughter of American jazz and big band singer Betty Bennett and German-American pianist, composer, and conductor André Previn KBE, conductor of the Houston, Pittsburgh, and London Symphony Orchestras and the Royal Philharmonic Orchestra.

Upon Previn's birth, her father wrote Lullaby On The Name of Claudia, Opus 170, No. 9a, published in 1954 by Casa Ricordi and dedicated "to Claudia." The song Claudia was released again in 2021 in the Oldies Selection: Best of André Previn.

Previn is the stepdaughter of the late master jazz guitarist Mundell Lowe.

== Early life and education ==
Previn grew up in Hollywood and attended Highland Hall Waldorf School and played guitar well by age 10.

She studied under her father as well. About musically instructing her at classical guitar and her younger sister on the violin, André Previn told the Los Angeles Times, "When I help them it's from an abstract view which I like better than if I picked up the instruments and played." She and her sister joined their father on stage at the 44th Hollywood Bowl so he could show them where to put the basket of sheet music he would be using to conduct that evening.

The childhoods of Previn and her sister Alicia Previn, of splitting time between their divorced mother and father and their respective homes in London, New York, and Hollywood, are included in the 2016 book Star Babies: The Shocking Lives of Hollywood's Children by Raymond Strait. In July 2024, Previn spoke at the Julian Branch Library about her parents and growing up in Hollywood, what she called "my soap opera life."

Previn graduated from the University of Southern California in 1977 with dual majors in German Language and Literature and Art History.

== Career ==
Previn's editing advice is included in The Chicago Manual of Style's "Shop Talk."

She performed in fall 2023 in a “Night on the Town” Broadcast Live 1940s-style Radio Show at Julian Town Hall theater Previn is a member of the Julian Theater Company.

Previn sang, in costume, two songs, "The Star Spangled Banner" and "God Save the Queen," at the House of England in 2014 to open an event in San Diego's Balboa Park.

In 1995, she performed in Colorado in the Longmont Theatre Company's Much Ado About Chocolate in a quartet featuring Tony White, Terry Strassmann and Susan Nace.

== Bibliography ==
=== Cover and book design ===
- Dancing Girl: Themes and Improvisations in a Greek Village by Thordis Simonsen (1991) (ISBN 0962976644)
- The Motel 6 Chronicles by P. Dean Coker, Valerie Maxine Schneider (ASIN B006HB9QH4)

=== Book editing ===
- Uncommon Occurrences: Actual Accounts of Extraordinary Experiences (2018) (ASIN B079HGZP8F)
- A Walk In Faith: Following A Call Of The Heart Led A Common Man On an Extraordinary Journey (2015) (ISBN 978-1441497154)
- Give Bees a Chance: we need them to live (2015) (ISBN 0984710728)
- The Strange Disappearance of Walter Tortoise (2014) (ISBN 0962976644)
- UNfatally Dead: to thaw or not to thaw? by Wayne Edmiston (2018) (ISBN 0999369806)

== Personal life ==
Previn is married to Jeffrey Stasny, a jazz and blues drummer, and sings professionally with him. She lives in Julian, California.
