= Alicia Previn =

American writer

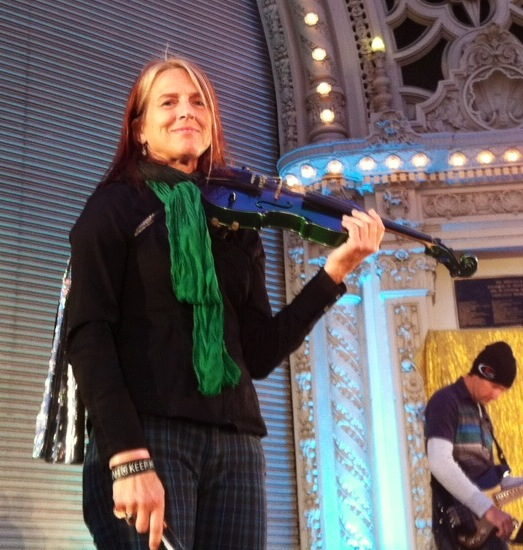
- Previn at the Balboa Park Organ Pavillion

Background information
- Also known as: Lovely Previn
- Born: February 1957 (age 69)
- Genres: Classic; rock; folk; blues; jazz
- Occupations: Violinist; songwriter; recording artist; author; illustrator
- Instrument: Violin
- Years active: 1970–present
- Website: aliciaprevin.com

Alicia Previn (also known as Lovely Previn; born February 1957) is an American violinist, songwriter, recording artist, and author. She is the daughter, along with sister Claudia Previn, of André Previn, conductor of the Houston, Pittsburgh, and London Symphony Orchestras and the Royal Philharmonic Orchestra, and American jazz singer Betty Bennett.

== Early years ==
Previn began playing the violin when she was 7 years old and was classically trained at the Royal Academy of Music in London by Virginia Majewski and Joan Rotchford-Davies. She experimented with other music genres such as rock, folk, blues, and jazz, performing in bands from age thirteen. In high school, she joined the London Symphony Orchestra Chorus, conducted by her father at the Royal Albert and Royal Festival Halls.

== Career ==
Previn recorded, performed and toured with a variety of bands and artists in diverse musical genres, playing across the globe on singles and CDs. She was also a member of the Irish rock group In Tua Nua as well as The Young Dubliners. She appeared on television in the U.S. and internationally in music TV shows, commercials, videos and MTV music videos. She also performed on Jay Leno's Tonight Show in 1993 with "The Cages" with British talk-show host Des O'Connor. Previn was nominated at the San Diego Music Awards in 2013 as best female musician with now disbanded group "Folding Mr. Lincoln".

Her recording career includes Polydor Records' artist, Philip D'Arrow, Atlantic Records' artist Andy Leek, London Records' artists The Hothouse Flowers, Virgin Records' band In Tua Nua, Dave King's band Flogging Molly (formerly Fastway) and Katmandu, Irish rock band Finn MacCool, New Red Archives Records' Ten Bright Spikes, Red Planet Records' The Bumpin' Uglies, Virgin Records' Cracker with David Lowery, JVC Records' Great White and Jack Russell, Capitol Records' Richard Thompson, and with Barry McGuire and Terry Talbot, as well as English bands such as General Public, The Communards, Barry Blue/Julian Littman Productions, and The Flying Pickets. She also leads her own band in the UK and released "Shatterproof" in 1982.

In August 2017 Previn was the subject of a cover story in the California-based publication, The San Diego Troubadour.

== Author ==
Previn has authored children's books addressing the ecological future including regarding earthworms, tortoises, and bees. The Earthworm Book includes instructions on how to start a small worm farm. Previn is also involved in the Bio-Dynamic Farming method. In Give Bees a Chance Previn deliberately put a picture of a bee on the top corner of every page. “That means the child has to touch it every time they turn the page." It is meant to help them lose their fear of being stung.

== Personal life ==
In the early 1970s, Previn joined the cult of the Source Family and moved with the family to San Francisco. After the death of their leader, Father Yod, the cult disbanded in 1978.

== Discography ==
=== Solo ===
Albums

- 1982 Lovely Previn - Shatterproof (U.K.)
- 2018 Alicia Previn - Lovely (U.S.)

Singles

- 1982 Lovely Previn - I'll Never Get Over You / Cheat (7" released in U.K., Scandinavia and Germany)
- 1982 Lovely Previn - Wasted Love / Down On The Farm (12" & 7" U.K. only)
- 1981 Lovely Previn - From A to B / Tower of Strength (7" released in U.K. and Germany)
- 2023 Alicia Previn - Purpose of a Dog / le Brusc (CD & Digitial)

Compilations

- 2000 Various Artists - Class X Volume 10 - U.S. release, includes Lovely Previn I'll Never Get Over You
- 1982 Various Artists - Wave News The New Generation of Music - German release, includes Lovely Previn From A to B Wasted Love

=== As a band member ===
- 2017 Hedersleben - Orbit
- 2013 Folding Mr. Lincoln - Two Rivers
- 2006 The Chuck Butler Band - On Fire
- 2002 Terry Talbot - Steps of the Mission
- 1995 The Young Dubliners - Breathe (reissued 1999)
- 1993 The Young Dubliners - Rocky Road (reissued 1998)
- 1988 In Tua Nua - The Long Acre (released in U.K., Japan, U.S., Europe, Canada, Italy - reissued in Italy with bonus tracks 2009)

== Selected session work ==
=== Albums ===
- 2024 John January - True
- 2022 Ken Lehnig - Between Us
- 2017 Laurie Beebe Lewis - Baby Birds
- 2016 Bob Monroe & The Vintage Cowboys - Classic Country (unreleased)
- 2013 Yael & Vlady - Delicious in Ze Middle
- 2010 Andy Leek - Midnight Music (originally recorded in 1982 as “Deceit”, but unreleased at the time)
- 2006 Hothouse Flowers - The Platinum Collection (#45 Ireland)
- 2002 Ric Blair Band - Break the Walls
- 2001 Richard Thompson - Action Packed: The Best Of The Capitol Years
- 2000 Hothouse Flowers - Best Of (#35 Ireland)
- 1999 Richard Thompson - Mock Tudor (#28 U.K.)
- 1996 Jack Russell - Shelter Me
- 1996 Great White - Let it Rock
- 1995 Ric Blair – Always By My Side
- 1994 Gerry Groom – Twice Blue
- 1994 Ten Bright Spikes - Crime Map (unreleased)
- 1993 Ten Bright Spikes - Astro Stukas
- 1993 Ten Bright Spikes - Blueland
- 1993 Gerry Groom Featuring Mick Taylor And Friends – Once In A Blue Moon
- 1992 Cracker - s/t (1st album)
- 1987 Hothouse Flowers - People (#1 Ireland, #2 U.K., #30 Australia, #88 U.S.)
- 1984 The Communards - s/t (#7 U.K., #15 Germany, #90 U.S.)
- 1984 General Public - All the Rage (#26 U.S., #19 Canada)

=== Singles ===
- 1992 Cracker - Can I Take My Gun To Heaven (U.K. Release, B-side of "Teen Angst (What the World Needs Now)(edit)")
- 1988 In Tua Nua - All I Wanted (#17 Ireland, #69 U.K. with full band poster sleeve)
- 1987 Hothouse Flowers – Easier In The Morning (#6 Ireland, #77 U.K., #98 Australia)
- 1984 Communards – You Are My World (#30 U.K.)
- 1984 Andde Leek – Dancing Queen (U.K. release)
- 1984 Andde Leek – Soul Darling (U.K. release)

=== Soundtracks ===
- 2017 Diamond Cartel (with Hedersleben – "Rarefied Air")
- 2019 Ruta Madre (with Joey Molina - "Little Hippie" featuring Alicia Previn)

== Bibliography ==
Four book "A Love for Nature Series" – "Teaching Kids About Caring for the Planet":

- 2009 The Earthworm Book ISBN 978-0984091300
- 2013 The Strange Disappearance of Walter Tortoise ISBN 978-0984710713
- 2014 Give Bees A Chance ISBN 978-0984710720
- 2020 What Paradise Found ISBN 978-0984710737
