= Wynola, California =

Unincorporated community in California, United States

Wynola
- Unincorporated community
- Location in California Wynola (the United States)
- Coordinates: 33°05′51″N 116°38′44″W
- Country: United States
- State: California
- County: San Diego
- Elevation: 3,645 ft (1,111 m)

Wynola is an unincorporated community located in the Spencer Valley in San Diego County, California.

Wynola is the site of the Spencer Valley School, a one-room public elementary school with a student population of 30-35 children. It is the only school in the Spencer Valley School District, founded in 1876. Built in 1905, the present one room schoolhouse replaced an earlier structure. In 1987, additional buildings were added providing modern facilities as a complement to the original building.

== Climate ==
According to the Köppen Climate Classification system, Wynola has a warm-summer Mediterranean climate, abbreviated "Csa" on climate maps.
