= Kilaga Springs, California =

Unincorporated community in California, United States

Kilaga Springs
- Unincorporated community
- Location in California Kilaga Springs (the United States)
- Coordinates: 38°58′16″N 121°14′53″W
- Country: United States
- State: California
- County: Placer County
- Elevation: 509 ft (155 m)

Kilaga Springs is a historic natural spring and resort in Placer County, California. Kilaga Springs is located 10.5 miles (16.9 km) west-northwest of Auburn. It lies at an elevation of 509 feet (155 m).

Kilaga Springs was established in 1923 on the site of a former mine known as Whiskey Diggings, where water seeped from the old mines. The name "Kilaga" came from the first letters of the site's founders, Kimberlin, Landis, and Gaylord. The water was said to have healing properties and was bottled and distributed. A spa and resort was soon built, which burned in 1924 and 1938; the spa closed after co-founder Edwin Gaylord was found dead in one of the cottages in 1940. The site was abandoned for many years after that, but a new resort has recently been established at the site.
