= Kirkwood, Tehama County, California =

Vanished town in California, United States

Kirkwood
- Unincorporated community
- Location in California Kirkwood (the United States)
- Coordinates: 39°51′19″N 122°09′43″W
- Country: United States
- State: California
- County: Tehama
- Elevation: 220 ft (67 m)

Kirkwood was a town in Tehama County, California, United States which survives only as the Kirkwood school district and Kirkwood cemetery today. It once had a post office and school, and a railway station. The town was not named Kirkwood (after Samuel J. Kirkwood) until the railway arrived; the school originally having been named Montgomery School and the property owned by postmaster William Wallace Watkins. The town grew up around the railway station.

The Methodist church in the town was built on donated land in 1888; however, the landowner claimed that because there was no deed, he in fact owned the church, and the parishioners would have to pay off a mortgage. In response, overnight, when the landowner was away, several community members put log rollers under the church and moved it to another, nearby, lot.

Kirkwood was also the location of one of Edgar J. De Pue's 15 warehouses in California.
