= Branson City, California =

Branson City Branson
- Ghost town
- Location in California Branson City (the United States)
- Coordinates: 33°04′41″N 116°37′2″W
- Country: United States
- State: California
- County: San Diego County
- Established: 1870
- Elevation: 3,996 ft (1,218 m)

Branson City or Branson is a ghost town in San Diego County, California. It lies at an elevation of 3996 feet. It is located on State Highway 78 at its junction with Pine Hills Road, about one mile west of Julian.

== History ==
Branson City was founded in August 1870 by a lawyer, Lewis C. Branson, west of Julian, along Coleman Creek, in the Julian Mining District. Branson City had a store, saloon, and a dance-hall, and also a post office from August 19, 1870, to October 13, 1870. Julian being closer to the lode gold being found in the hills farther up stream, supplanted Branson City, which was also more exposed to the elements than Julian and it soon disappeared.
