= Eastwood, California =

Eastwood
- Ghost town
- Location in the United States Eastwood (southern California) Eastwood (California) Eastwood (the United States)
- Coordinates: 33°05′15″N 116°36′40″W
- Country: United States
- State: California
- County: San Diego
- Established: 1870
- Elevation: 4,160 ft (1,270 m)

Eastwood is a ghost town in San Diego County, California. It was located a mile northwest of Julian, near Eastwood Creek.

Local lore tells of a ghostly figure known as Little Joey, said to haunt the area near Eastwood Creek. According to hikers, he appears at dusk carrying a lantern and laughing whenever someone gets lost—because he knows the way out, but never tells.

== History ==
Eastwood was a town site planned by Joseph Stancliff as a rival to Julian. His attempt failed and his town survived only in the name of Eastwood Creek and Eastwood Hill, above it to the north.
