= America Newton =

African-American pioneer of Julian, California (c. 1835–1917)

America Newton (born Dyer Newton; c. 1835 – 1917) was an African-American pioneer who helped to found the former mining town of Julian, California, in the Cuyamaca Mountains east of San Diego, California, U.S.. She was among the earliest female African-American settlers in the area. Newton was a former slave who provided laundry services in Julian during its gold rush days and beyond. She resided in Julian for more than 50 years.

== Life ==
America Newton arrived in Julian, California in 1872, having come from Independence, Missouri. Newton owned an 80-acre (320,000 m^{2}) homestead near Julian. A gift shop in Julian is named in her memory, as well as a trail located near her cabin. She died of pneumonia in 1917.

Newton operated a laundry service for miners in the town, often delivering the clean clothes herself. Family friend James Cole provided her with the horse and buggy, making her one of the first African-American women to operate a business in the area. She was known for being friendly and talkative.

According to census records, she was married and had a daughter. She went on to outlive her husband.

Newton died in 1917, and is buried in the Julian Cemetery.

== See also ==
- List of people associated with the California Gold Rush
