= Betty Bennett (singer) =

American jazz singer (1921–2020)

- Born: October 23, 1921
- Died: April 7, 2020 (aged 98)

Betty Bennett (October 23, 1921 – April 7, 2020) was an American jazz and big band singer.

Bennett was born in October 1921 in Lincoln, Nebraska, United States. Her first major signing was with the Claude Thornhill band in 1946, the band in which her husband, bassist Iggy Shevak, was playing. Shortly after her husband left to join Alvino Rey, Bennett followed him there. In 1949, she joined Charlie Ventura's band, before going on to join Benny Goodman in 1959.

Her second album, Nobody Else but Me, featured arrangements by Shorty Rogers and her second husband, German-American conductor and composer André Previn. Bennett later married guitarist Mundell Lowe in 1975. He died in December 2017 at the age of 95.

Bennett died in April 2020 at the age of 98.

== Personal life ==
Bennett had two daughters, Claudia Previn and Alicia Previn, with husband André Previn.

== Discography ==
- Betty Bennett Sings Previn Arrangements (Trend, 1953)
- Nobody Else but Me (Atlantic, 1955)
- Blue Sunday (Kapp, 1957)
- I Love to Sing with Andre Previn (United Artists, 1959)
- The Song Is You (Fresh Sound, 1992)
