= Julian, California =

Julian
- census-designated place
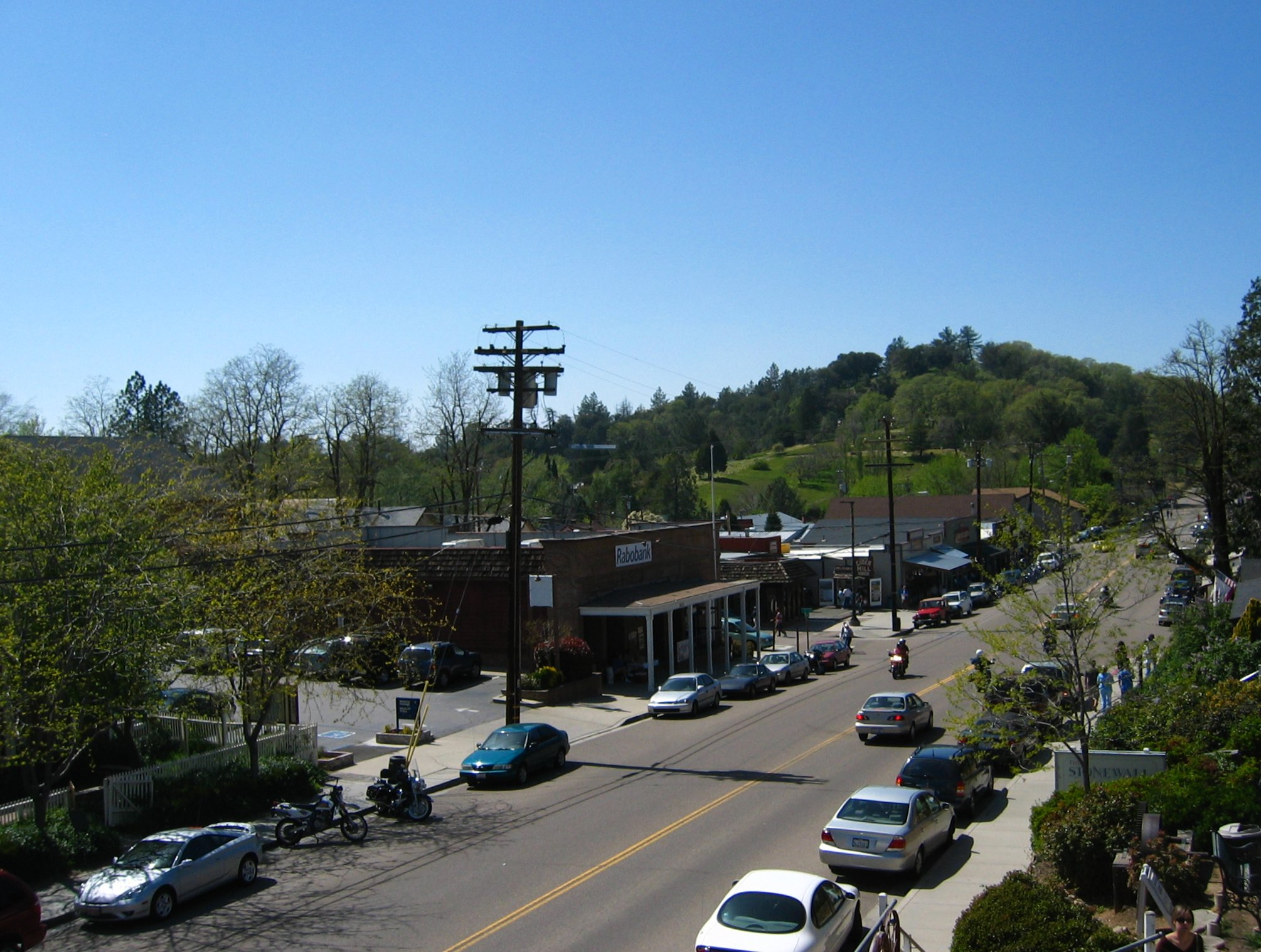
- Main Street in Julian

- Flag
- Motto(s): "four seasons of beauty & fun..."
- Location in San Diego County and the state of California

- Location in the United States Julian (southern California) Julian (California) Julian (the United States)
- Coordinates: 33°4′15″N 116°35′8″W
- Country: United States
- State: California
- County: San Diego
- Named for: Mike Julian

Area
  - Total: 7.886 sq mi (20.425 km^{2})
  - Land: 7.886 sq mi (20.425 km^{2})
  - Water: 0 sq mi (0 km^{2}) 0%
- Elevation: 4,226 ft (1,288 m)

Population (2020)
  - Total: 1,768
  - Density: 224.2/sq mi (86.56/km^{2})
- Time zone: UTC-8 (PST)
  - Summer (DST): UTC-7 (PDT)
- ZIP code: 92036
- Area codes: 442/760
- FIPS code: 06-37582
- GNIS feature ID: 1652732
- Website: Julian Chamber of Commerce

California Historical Landmark
- Reference no.: 412

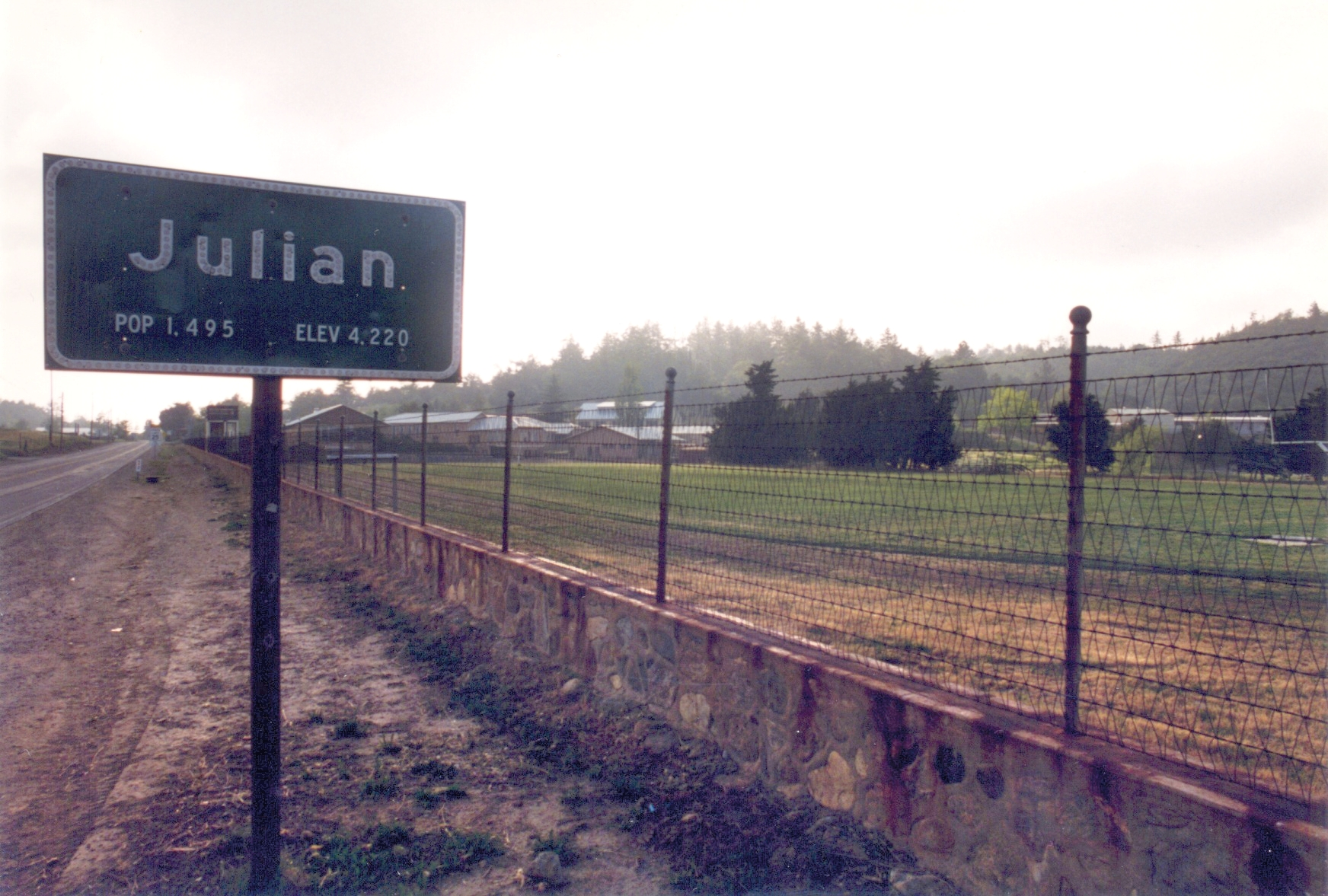
Julian community limit

Julian is a census-designated place (CDP) in San Diego County, California, which developed as a classic gold rush boomtown in the 1870s after gold was discovered by Fred Coleman, attracting miners, a tent city, rapid growth with saloons and stores, and discussions of becoming a county seat, before transitioning into a more stable community with agriculture and tourism. As of the 2020 census, the population was 1,768, up from 1,502 at the 2010 census.

Julian is an official California Historical Landmark (No. 412). The Julian townsite and surrounding area is defined by the San Diego County Zoning Ordinance Section 5749 as the Julian Historic District. This designation requires that development adhere to certain guidelines administered by the Architectural Review Board of the Julian Historic District, which is appointed by the San Diego County Board of Supervisors.

Julian was named an International Dark Sky Community by the International Dark-Sky Association in May 2021. It was the 30th such designation and the second in California.

The town is known for its apple pie and its annual Julian Apple Days Festival, which began in 1949.

== History ==
=== 19th century: Initial European settlement and the gold rush ===
The first European settlers were "Cockney Bill" Williams from England and John Wesley Horrell, who arrived in the area in 1850 or 1851. The town was first settled by Drury, Frank, and J.O. Bailey, all brothers; and their cousins, Mike and Webb Julian. They passed through the region in 1869 from San Bernardino en route to Arizona, in the wake of the American Civil War. Taken by the beauty of the Julian area, Drury Bailey interrupted the group’s travel plans and chose to settle there; he named the settlement “Julian” after Mike Julian because “Mike was better looking” than any other member of the Bailey family. Julian was also a former Confederate soldier who was later elected San Diego County Assessor. Shortly afterwards gold was discovered in the Julian region. A tent city initially formed in the boomtown era, followed by more permanent structures as it became apparent that gold mining in Julian would persist for some time. Victorian-style structures were constructed in the late stage of Julian's early settlement, including the Hoskins House.

After the American Civil War, in 1869, A.E. "Fred" Coleman, a former slave, crossed what is now known as Coleman Creek just west of Julian. Seeing a glint of gold in the stream bed, he climbed down from his horse to investigate. Having had previous experience in the gold fields, he retrieved his frying pan and began panning the sands of the creek. Soon thereafter, Coleman established the Coleman Mining District, served as its recorder, and founded the mining camp called Emily City, later renamed Coleman City. Learning of the find, others rushed to the district and tried to trace the gold to its source. On February 22, 1870, the first "lode", or hard rock, mining claim was filed in the Julian area. Since February 22 was President George Washington's birthday, the mine was named the Washington mine. Soon, hundreds of anxious men and families rushed to Julian to stake their claims. Julian experienced a gold rush and became a tent city overnight. In April 1870, the area's first sawmill was constructed and Julian began to take on a more permanent appearance. Attempts to build rival mining towns at Coleman City, Branson City, and Eastwood were defeated. Owners of the Cuyamaca rancho Land Grant claimed (the Cuyamaca Land Float) Julian, and its mines were within the Rancho boundaries. In 1873, the courts ruled that the Rancho did not include Julian and the mines. While the miners tried to wrestle the gold from deep within the earth, James Madison brought a wagonload of young apple trees into the mountains. The fruit trees flourished. Apples remain a substantial product in Julian, many of which are used for making the widely-known Julian apple pies. Local historians have variably suggested that the Julian of 1873 rivaled San Diego in population and they unsuccessfully attempted to move the county seat to the city.

According to a bronze historical plaque appearing in the town, in the early days of Julian, the majority of San Diego County's Black population resided in or near the town, including the founders of the Robinson Hotel and a noted resident, America Newton, a freed slave who laundered miners' clothing. Of the 55 Black people living in San Diego County during the 1880 census, 33 lived in the Julian area.

=== 20th century ===
In 1976, Julian approved a plan that required the exteriors of any buildings on Main Street be no younger in age than 1913. Many structures bear a Victorian architecture that predates this cutoff. In the 1970s, as many of 25,000 visitors visited the settlement per annum.

Julian had four or five wells in the 1970s. A county planner surveyed the water capacity for Julian and indicated that it was unlikely that Julian would ever have enough inexpensive water to sustain large-scale development. During a period of drought, the community of Julian was compelled by the San Diego County supervisors to obey a moratorium on development until a 30,000 gallon waste treatment plant could reduce the risk that a developing Julian’s sewage output might pollute the San Diego River. Julian’s water supply became largely dependent on a single well owned by a local property owner named Jerry Zweig, as the community’s water board-owned resources were depleted in a drought in the 1990s and were severely limited by contamination as a defunct Chevron gasoline station contaminated three of the eight publicly owned water wells into the late 1980s.

On May 29, 1989, Benjamin Haimes of Encino and Gustav Oran Hudson of El Cajon) disputed a claim to land to the Ready Relief and Hubbard Mines in Julian’s Chariot Canyon (historically owned by the Bureau of Land Management) over rights to an area where both had intentions to prospect for gold. Hudson and his family arrived at the property at a time when Haimes’ appointed caretaker (Chris Zerbe) and the caretaker’s friend (Joe Lopes) of Julian. The resulting escalation involved the replacement of a padlock at the Hubbard Mine by the Hudsons, conflicting accounts of alcohol use and escalative behavior by Zerbe, and a shootout in which Zerbe and Lopes (who did not fire) were ultimately killed. No charges were filed. Nicknamed the “Chariot Canyon Massacre,” these killings are understood to be the first gold prospecting-related killing in Julian since the gold rush of the late 1800s.

A controversy erupted in Julian in 1991 as the community lost its bid to resist the construction of fast food restaurants. Dairy Queen and Subway were the first to locate to the town during this time. Zweig circumvented a community moratorium on new development (induced due to the town’s longstanding drought), agreeing to continue selling 30,000 gallons of water a day in return for the waiver to build. Zweig, also the owner of the largest well in the community, allegedly threatened to cut off the community’s water supply unless they acquiesced. Neither business was supported by the community, and both have since closed.

==== Railroad ====
In the 1960s, motion picture animator Ollie Johnston acquired and restored a full-size 3 ft (914 mm) Porter steam locomotive originally built in 1901, named the Marie E. He then built the Deer Lake Park & Julian Railroad (DLP&J) at his vacation estate in Julian to run the locomotive with a small gondola and caboose pulling behind it, using railroad ties from the defunct Viewliner Train of Tomorrow attraction in Disneyland. The Marie E. first ran in 1968. Johnston sold the vacation estate and the narrow gauge train in 1993, and the engine and its consist were sold, running one last time on the Disneyland Railroad during a private event.

=== 21st century ===
The region around Julian was hit by a multi-year drought starting in 1999, leading up and into the catastrophic Cedar Fire of 2003 following an extremely wet 1997–1998 El Niño cycle which caused substantial growth of brush. Residents of Julian reported drilling wells up to 600–800 feet (180–240 m) to strike water during this period, well over twice as deep as they have had to drill in the town’s history. This has also been controversially attributed to stressors from the development of weekend and holiday housing in the town. Drought conditions were noted to have allowed the rise of beetle pests to consume Coulter pines in and around the community, as the pines do not have access to enough water to protect their trunks with sap. The drought-induced devastation of the Coulter pines due to the beetles allowed some landowners in the Volcan Mountains to the immediate north of Julian to obtain exemptions from filing timber-harvest plans. These plans are normally required under the California Environmental Quality Act and effectively allow the state to regulate the logging practices exercised on a parcel of land, raising fears in Julian that overlogging might be technically permissible in light of the Coulter pine disaster.

In recent decades, Julian has become a quaint mountain resort, with most businesses oriented toward tourism rather than local services. The main area of town narrowly escaped destruction in the 2003 Cedar Fire that burned much of the surrounding area.

In 2004, an interviewing journalist noted that up to a third of Julian’s population had been affected by property losses associated with fire. The local fire district had recently removed property-tax benefit fees, making reconstruction more difficult for residents devastated by fires. Drought and infestation of the local forests by pine bark beetles was observed to exacerbate the fire season’s stressing effect on the community.

Fire disruptions as of 2004 were observed in Julian to have caused the disappearance of populations of red-winged blackbirds, acorn woodpeckers, white-crowned sparrows, lesser goldfinches, scrub jays, Steller’s jays, nuthatches, and black-headed grosbeaks.

Luxury home developments expanded the community of Julian into the early 2010s. These developments (such as the New England-themed Hoskings Ranch development), which often exceed $1 million in listing prices, are predominantly owned as vacation homes by individuals who principally live in La Jolla, with significant concentrations from Del Mar and Coronado in metropolitan San Diego.

In 2017, the Julian Arts Guild opened an art gallery in downtown Julian, Julian Arts Guild Gallery, where local artists and artisans display their works.

On April 14, 2025, a magnitude 5.2 earthquake struck 2.5 miles south of Julian at around 10 a.m. Minor damage occurred, but there were no injuries. Some roads were closed because of fallen boulders.

== Geography ==
According to the United States Census Bureau, the CDP has a total area of 7.9 square miles (20 km^{2}), all land.

Soils in and around Julian are mostly dark brown, slightly to moderately acidic sandy loams which are well drained and of variable stoniness. Less stony areas, which underlie most of the townsite, are in the Holland series. The hills around town have rocky soils of the Crouch series. Somewhat poorly drained alluvial loam occurs along Coleman Creek.

=== Climate ===
Julian experiences more extreme temperatures and greater precipitation than much of southern California. It also receives snow annually, which accumulates the most in February and March. This attracts people from San Diego and other coastal cities, where snow is a once-in-a-lifetime event. As is typical in southern California, the summer has the driest months, but with a number of monsoonal storms from the southeast. Average yearly snowfall from 1991 to 2020 has been 6.4 inches (16 cm). According to the Koppen climate classification system, Julian experiences a hot summer Mediterranean climate (Csa).

Climate data for JULIAN CDF, CA, 1991–2020 normals, extremes 1893–1896, 1988–present
Month	Jan	Feb	Mar	Apr	May	Jun	Jul	Aug	Sep	Oct	Nov	Dec	Year
Record high °F (°C)	76 (24)	77 (25)	85 (29)	90 (32)	96 (36)	106 (41)	103 (39)	101 (38)	102 (39)	96 (36)	82 (28)	74 (23)	106 (41)
Mean daily maximum °F (°C)	52.9 (11.6)	54.1 (12.3)	57.5 (14.2)	62.3 (16.8)	68.5 (20.3)	79.1 (26.2)	85.5 (29.7)	85.9 (29.9)	80.9 (27.2)	70.7 (21.5)	60.0 (15.6)	52.2 (11.2)	67.5 (19.7)
Daily mean °F (°C)	45.8 (7.7)	46.4 (8.0)	49.2 (9.6)	52.5 (11.4)	57.8 (14.3)	67.2 (19.6)	74.0 (23.3)	74.1 (23.4)	69.1 (20.6)	60.2 (15.7)	51.7 (10.9)	45.1 (7.3)	57.8 (14.3)
Mean daily minimum °F (°C)	38.8 (3.8)	38.8 (3.8)	40.9 (4.9)	42.8 (6.0)	47.1 (8.4)	55.2 (12.9)	62.5 (16.9)	62.4 (16.9)	57.4 (14.1)	49.7 (9.8)	43.4 (6.3)	38.1 (3.4)	48.1 (8.9)
Record low °F (°C)	14 (−10)	15 (−9)	17 (−8)	24 (−4)	30 (−1)	33 (1)	42 (6)	36 (2)	32 (0)	27 (−3)	19 (−7)	15 (−9)	14 (−10)
Average precipitation inches (mm)	4.66 (118)	5.34 (136)	3.90 (99)	1.94 (49)	0.82 (21)	0.10 (2.5)	0.24 (6.1)	0.29 (7.4)	0.35 (8.9)	1.11 (28)	2.26 (57)	3.47 (88)	24.48 (622)
Average snowfall inches (cm)	1.1 (2.8)	1.9 (4.8)	3.0 (7.6)	0.2 (0.51)	0.0 (0.0)	0.0 (0.0)	0.0 (0.0)	0.0 (0.0)	0.0 (0.0)	0.0 (0.0)	0.0 (0.0)	0.2 (0.51)	6.4 (16)
Average precipitation days (≥ 0.01 in)	5.7	7.7	6.4	4.3	2.8	0.5	1.4	1.3	1.4	3.0	4.4	6.1	45.0
Average snowy days (≥ 0.1 in)	0.4	0.4	0.7	0.2	0.0	0.0	0.0	0.0	0.0	0.0	0.0	0.1	1.8
Source: NOAA

== Demographics ==
Historical population
Census	Pop.	Note	%±
1980	1,320		—
1990	1,284		−2.7%
2000	1,621		26.2%
2010	1,502		−7.3%
2020	1,768		17.7%
U.S. Decennial Census; 1860–1870 1880-1890; 1900 1910 1920; 1930 1940 1950; 1960 1970 1980; 1990 2000 2010; 2020

Julian was first listed as a census designated place in the 1980 U.S. census.

=== Racial and ethnic composition ===
Julian CDP, California – Racial and ethnic composition Note: the US Census treats Hispanic/Latino as an ethnic category. This table excludes Latinos from the racial categories and assigns them to a separate category. Hispanics/Latinos may be of any race.
Race / Ethnicity (NH = Non-Hispanic)	Pop 2000	Pop 2010	Pop 2020	% 2000	% 2010	% 2020
White alone (NH)	1,410	1,239	1,261	86.98%	82.49%	71.32%
Black or African American alone (NH)	11	5	18	0.68%	0.33%	1.02%
Native American or Alaska Native alone (NH)	19	24	18	1.17%	1.60%	1.02%
Asian alone (NH)	8	11	18	0.49%	0.73%	1.02%
Native Hawaiian or Pacific Islander alone (NH)	2	0	3	0.12%	0.00%	0.17%
Other race alone (NH)	5	2	11	0.31%	0.13%	0.62%
Mixed race or Multiracial (NH)	35	26	114	2.16%	1.73%	6.45%
Hispanic or Latino (any race)	131	195	325	8.08%	12.98%	18.38%
Total	1,621	1,502	1,768	100.00%	100.00%	100.00%

=== 2020 census ===
As of the 2020 census, Julian had a population of 1,768, an increase of 266. The median age was 50.6 years. 16.8% of residents were under the age of 18 and 26.9% were 65 years of age or older. For every 100 females there were 100.0 males, and for every 100 females age 18 and over there were 95.1 males.

100.0% of residents lived in rural areas.

There were 751 households in Julian, of which 19.7% had children under the age of 18 living in them. Of all households, 45.3% were married-couple households, 24.2% were households with a male householder and no spouse or partner present, and 25.4% were households with a female householder and no spouse or partner present. About 35.8% of all households were made up of individuals and 21.7% had someone living alone who was 65 years of age or older.

There were 988 housing units, of which 24.0% were vacant. The homeowner vacancy rate was 1.2% and the rental vacancy rate was 9.9%.

=== Demographic estimates ===
Between 2020 and 2021, the population of Julian grew from 1,318 to 1,332, a 1.06% increase and its median household income grew from $71,480 to $74,121, a 3.69% increase.

The five largest ethnic groups in Julian are White (Non-Hispanic) (81.6%), Two+ (Hispanic) (12.9%), Two+ (Non-Hispanic) (3.15%), White (Hispanic) (2.33%), and Black or African American (Non-Hispanic) (0%), and 98.9% of the residents in Julian are U.S. citizens.

In 2021, the median property value was $478,300, and the homeownership rate was 92.2%.

=== 2010 census ===
According to the 2010 United States census Julian had a population of 1,502. The population density was 191.6 inhabitants per square mile (74.0/km^{2}). The racial makeup of Julian was 1,341 (89.3%) White, 5 (0.3%) African American, 27 (1.8%) Native American, 12 (0.8%) Asian, 0 (0.0%) Pacific Islander, 81 (5.4%) from other races, and 36 (2.4%) from two or more races. There were 195 people of Hispanic or Latino origin, of any race (13.0%).

The Census reported that 1,502 people (100% of the population) lived in households, zero (0%) lived in non-institutionalized group quarters, and zero (0%) were institutionalized.

There were 670 households, out of which 146 (21.8%) had children under the age of 18 living in them, 329 (49.1%) were opposite-sex married couples living together, 51 (7.6%) had a female householder with no husband present, 35 (5.2%) had a male householder with no wife present. There were 41 (6.1%) unmarried opposite-sex partnerships, and 4 (0.6%) same-sex married couples or partnerships. 209 households (31.2%) were made up of individuals, and 89 (13.3%) had someone living alone who was 65 years of age or older. The average household size was 2.24. There were 415 families (61.9% of all households); the average family size was 2.80.

The age distribution included 283 people (18.8%) under the age of 18, 76 people (5.1%) aged 18 to 24, 260 people (17.3%) aged 25 to 44, 585 people (38.9%) aged 45 to 64, and 298 people (19.8%) who were 65 years of age or older. The median age was 50.8 years. For every 100 females, 96.1 were males. For every 100 females age 18 and over, there were 95.4 males.

There were 917 housing units at an average density of 117.0 per square mile (45.2/km^{2}), of which 489 (73.0%) were owner-occupied, and 181 (27.0%) were occupied by renters. The homeowner vacancy rate was 3.0%; the rental vacancy rate was 9.5%. 1,065 people (70.9% of the population) lived in owner-occupied housing units and 437 people (29.1%) lived in rental housing units.

== Culture ==
=== Arts and entertainment ===
- Galloping On and Satan's Blade were filmed on location in Julian.
- Principal photography for Phantasm took place at an ice cream parlor on Main Street in Julian.
- Scenes in Carving a Life included several landmarks in Julian and included residents local to the area.
- The 2019 film Beneath the Leaves is set in Julian.
- Several locations in Julian were used for the 2020 film Sweet Taste of Souls.
- Julian Arts Guild Gallery is open weekends for tourists.
- The Julian Pioneer Museum
- Julian Theater Company produces several plays each year in the Town Hall theater and at the Julian High School Little Theater.

== Notable people ==
- L.A. Edwards, folk-rock musical group
- John Baca, decorated Vietnam War veteran and activist for homeless veterans
- Eleanor Burns, quilt maker, author, host of public television show
- A. E. Coleman, former slave who discovered gold in Julian
- Rick Dyer, video game designer
- James Hubbell, artist, architect, sculptor, and founder of the Ilan-Lael Foundation
- Ollie Johnston, American motion picture animator
- Don Kojis, former record-breaking, All-Star professional basketball player
- Richard Louv, journalist and author
- America Newton, former slave who helped launch the mining town
- Scott O'Dell, screenwriter and author of Island of the Blue Dolphins, who moved to Julian in the 1950s
- Donald Pike, former child farmhand in Julian who became a Los Angeles County Superior Court Commissioner
- Claudia Previn, singer, musician, actress, editor and graphic artist
- Sig Ruman, German-American actor known for playing villains
- Cathy Scott, true-crime author and journalist
- Doug Sheehan, television actor
- Don Weeke, fiber and gourd artist
- Don Winslow, screenwriter and novelist

== Economy ==
The main employment sectors in Julian are tourism and agriculture, with emphasis on apples. Julian is on the Pacific Crest Trail.

== Government ==
In the California State Legislature, Julian is in the 32nd senatorial district, represented by Republican Kelly Seyarto, and in the 75th Assembly district, represented by Republican Carl DeMaio.

In the United States House of Representatives, Julian is in California's 48th congressional district, represented by Republican Darrell Issa.

== Education ==
The Julian Union School District operates one elementary, one junior high, one high school, and the Julian Charter School.

== Infrastructure ==
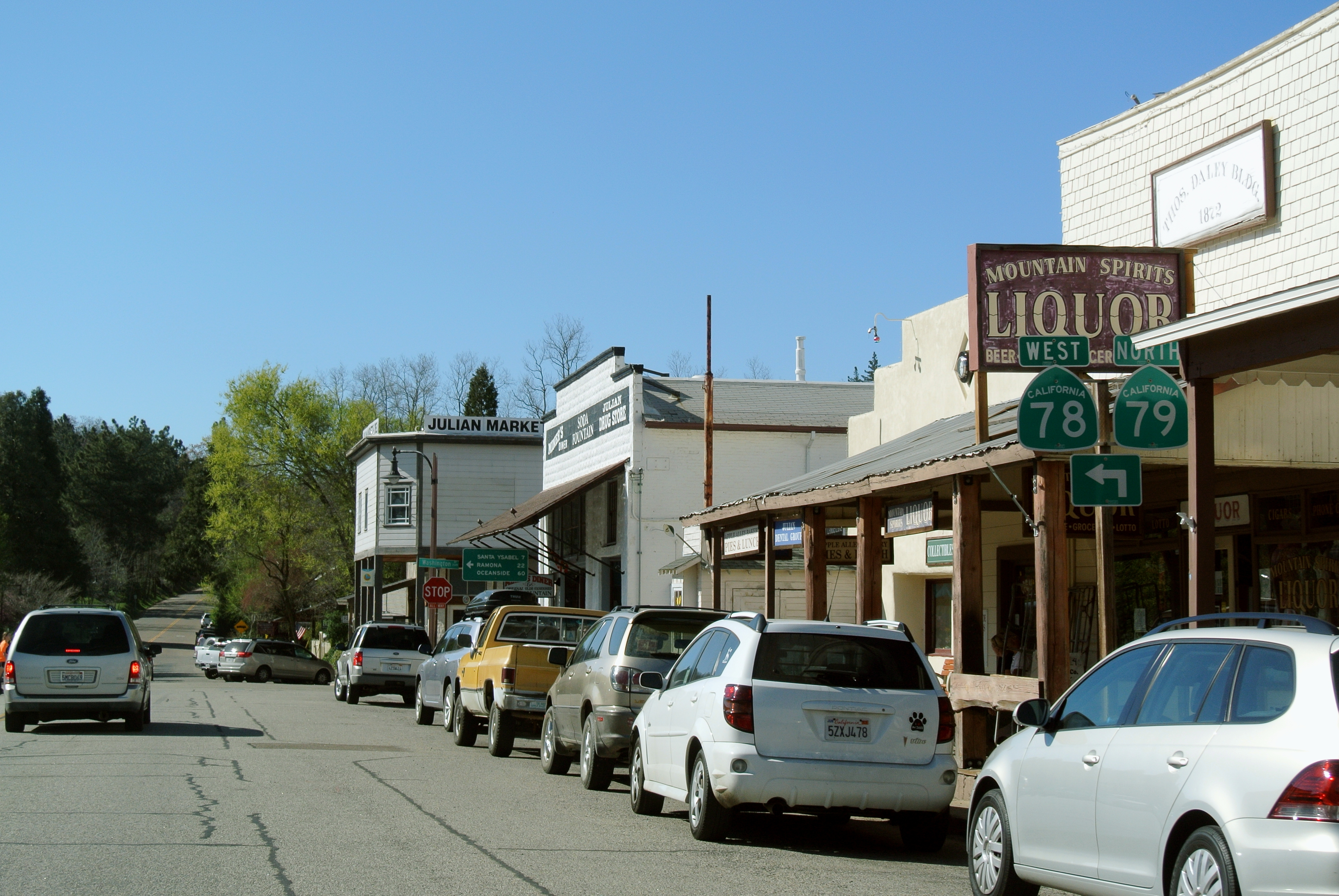
California State Route 78 and 79 in Julian

=== Transportation ===
Access to Julian is limited to three major roads. The northern access is via State Route 79, which ultimately links to various other roads and highways serving northern San Diego and southwestern Riverside counties, including I-15. SR 78 comes to Julian from the west, providing access to Ramona and Escondido. The eastern access is SR 78, which descends the eastern slope of the mountains to intersect with SR 86 in Imperial County; this is the least commonly used of the three routes. The southern access is SR 79 through Cuyamaca Rancho State Park, which then links to I-8.

Public transportation includes bus service from either El Cajon or Borrego Springs, via San Diego Metropolitan Transit System on route #891.

== Attractions ==
The California Wolf Center lies four miles (6.4 km) outside of Julian, and is the principal captive breeding facility for the endangered Mexican wolf (which, as of 2012, had fewer than 50 wild members of its species). Alaskan wolves have also been raised and studied at the facility. The California Wolf Center is managed in conjunction with the United States Forest Service but is financed entirely through private donations.
