= Pacific Ridge School =

Prep school in Carlsbad, California, US

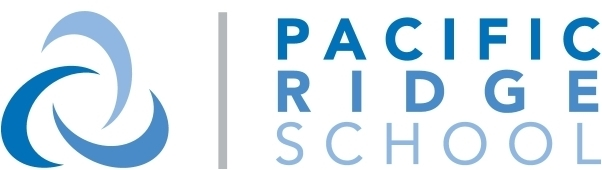

Location
- Carlsbad, California; United States
- 33°07′27″N 117°14′58″W

Information
- Motto: Academic Excellence, Ethical Responsibility, Global Engagement
- Religious affiliations: Independent, Private Day School
- Established: 2007
- Head teacher: Bob Ogle, Ed.D., M.A.
- Grades: 6-12
- Enrollment: 685 (2022-23)
- Mascot: Firebirds
- Website: www.pacificridge.org

Pacific Ridge School (PRS) is an independent co-educational college preparatory school for students in grades 6–12. The private school is located in the Bressi Ranch community of Carlsbad, California.

The school educates 661 students enrolled during the 2025–2026 school year.

== History and leadership ==
In the fall of 2002, several families began thinking about the prospect for an independent middle and high school in North County San Diego, California. They crafted a mission statement to guide the development and operation of the school, formed a founding Board of Trustees, and purchased land in south Carlsbad for the campus. The school opened in 2007.

Eileen Mullady, an educator with a background in secondary and higher education, came to Pacific Ridge School from Horace Mann School in New York. She took up the position of founding Head of School in the summer of 2005.

Current Head of School, Bob Ogle, joined the founding staff in 2006 and assisted Mullady and the Board of Trustees implement the vision for Pacific Ridge School, as well as its construction and programs. He became Co-Head of School in July 2011 and succeeded Mullady upon her retirement in April 2013.

Pacific Ridge welcomed its founding seventh- and ninth-grade students in the fall of 2007. Additional grades were subsequently added and the first graduating class was in 2011.

== Academics ==
=== Harkness Learning ===
Pacific Ridge School is Harkness Learning. Instead of sitting at rows of desks facing a blackboard, classes of 15 students sit with their teacher around a large, oval table, called a Harkness table. Because of this arrangement, the exchange of information during a lesson differs from that in a traditional classroom. Students listen, ask questions, and learn from the teacher and from each other.

The school maintains a student-to-faculty ratio of 7:1.

Pacific Ridge School's curriculum and graduation requirements exceed those of the State of California diploma and UC/CSU eligibility.

== Athletics ==
Pacific Ridge School is a member of the California Interscholastic Federation San Diego Section and competes in the Coastal Conference.

Middle school teams compete in the South Coast Middle School League and offer a “no cut” participation policy, so that all students have the opportunity to play team sports and try a sport with which they may not already be familiar.

== Student life ==
=== Academic competition clubs ===
Model United Nations:

The Pacific Ridge School team participates in several regional and national MUN competitions each year, and hosts the annual North Coast Regional Conference in partnership with High Tech High North County.

Academic League:

Pacific Ridge School participates in the North Division of the North County Academic League, competing against Mission Vista High School, Rancho Buena Vista High School, Vista High School, Guajome Park Academy, Oceanside High School and El Camino High School.

Science Olympiad:

Pacific Ridge School competes in the San Diego Regional Science Olympiad in Divisions B and C.

Robotics:

Pacific Ridge School hosts both Middle School and Upper School Robotics teams and competes in SeaPerch Underwater Robotics and FIRST Tech Challenge. Both teams have progressed to regional and national competitions.

=== Student publications ===
Global Vantage, a student-run publication and service learning group collaborates with students from Kibera Girls Soccer Academy in Kibera, Kenya and Canyon Crest Academy in San Diego. The print and online magazine collects and edits stories from authors around the world, and has won numerous national awards. These include the Edmund J. Sullivan Award (2014), Gold Crown Award (2014, 2012) from the Columbia Scholastic Press Association and the U.S. Department of Education's 2012 National Education Startup Challenge.

The Element is a student publication featuring digital media arts, studio arts and poetry.

Ridge Report is a weekly online student newspaper.

=== School publications ===
The school publishes its magazine, "The VIEW" twice yearly, as well as weekly e-newsletters to the school community.

== See also ==
- List of primary and secondary schools in San Diego
