= Joseph Clevenger =

American educator (born 1980)

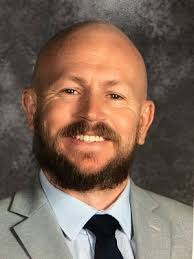
- Clevenger in 2019

Superintendent of Bonsall Unified School District
- Incumbent
- Assumed office July 1, 2021
- Preceded by: David Jones

Personal details
- Born: Joseph Aaron Clevenger; April 22, 1980 (age 46) Provo, Utah, U.S.
- Spouse: Kim Clevenger
- Children: 8
- Education: California State University San Marcos (BLA); Pepperdine University (MEd)
- Occupation: Educator, Superintendent

Joseph Aaron Clevenger (/klɛvɛndʒər/; born April 22, 1980) is an American educator who is currently serving as Assistant Superintendent over Student Services at the San Diego County Office Of Education. Before working at the county level, he served as the superintendent of Bonsall Unified School District. Prior to his tenure as superintendent, he served as the Principal of Rancho Buena Vista High School from 2019 to 2021.

== Early life and education ==
Clevenger was born on April 22, 1980, in Provo, Utah, the son of a molecular biologist and a high school physics teacher. He grew up in Seattle, Washington, before moving to Vista, California, where he attended Rancho Buena Vista High School. After graduating, Clevenger served as a full-time missionary for the Church of Jesus Christ of Latter-Day Saints in Santo Domingo, Dominican Republic, where he became fluent in Spanish.

Clevenger attended California State University San Marcos, where he earned a bachelor's degree in liberal arts in 2004. He attended Pepperdine University from 2008 to 2010, receiving a master's degree in education.

== Career ==
Clevenger began his career in Riverside County, working as a teacher and administrator for Santa Rosa Academy and Elsinore Unified School District before transferring south to San Diego County, where he served as the principal of Normal L. Sullivan Middle School in 2015. As principal of Sullivan Middle School, he was responsible for increasing access to STEM programs on campus and academic outreach support for low-income students, especially indigenous students from the Pala Indian Reservation. After the Lilac fire of 2017 devastated much of Bonsall and the neighboring community, Clevenger was instrumental in leading the cleanup and response that followed, both in the community and at the school, and was recognized by local leaders and afflicted families for his disaster relief efforts.

In 2019, Clevenger was hired as the principal of Rancho Buena Vista High School, where he had graduated as a student some 20 years beforehand. He was critical in leading the school's response to the COVID-19 pandemic, and often shared his experience in forums for public educators about his student-focused approach to getting back to the "new normal."

In June 2021, it was announced that Clevenger would return to Bonsall, this time to serve as superintendent. His work as superintendent has included traffic upgrades for schools, speaking at statewide events about his experiences succeeding during the pandemic, and lobbying for the construction of new schools in the district, including a new campus for Bonsall High School and a new elementary school in northern Bonsall. In March 2023, the California Department of Education recognized 59 schools across the entire state of more than 10,000 schools for the Purple Star award, given for a school's excellence in serving the children of military families and veterans. All five of the schools in Bonsall Unified School District were recipients, an unprecedented occasion that prompted an award ceremony at Bonsall West Elementary School featuring Lieutenant General George W. Smith Jr., Commanding General I Marine Expeditionary Force, and a number of prominent military and community leaders.

In 2023, Clevenger debuted the Bonsall Forward Initiative, a scholarship fund aimed at addressing the disparity in female and underrepresented populations in STEM academics in careers by better funding classrooms and by awarding scholarship money to students as early as 6th grade.

== Personal life ==
Joseph Clevenger has lived in Southern California for over 30 years.

Clevenger currently serves as President of the Rotary Club of Bonsall.

== See also ==
- Bonsall Unified School District
- Lilac Fire
