= Lilac Fire =

2017 wildfire in Southern California

- Part of the December 2017 Southern California wildfires
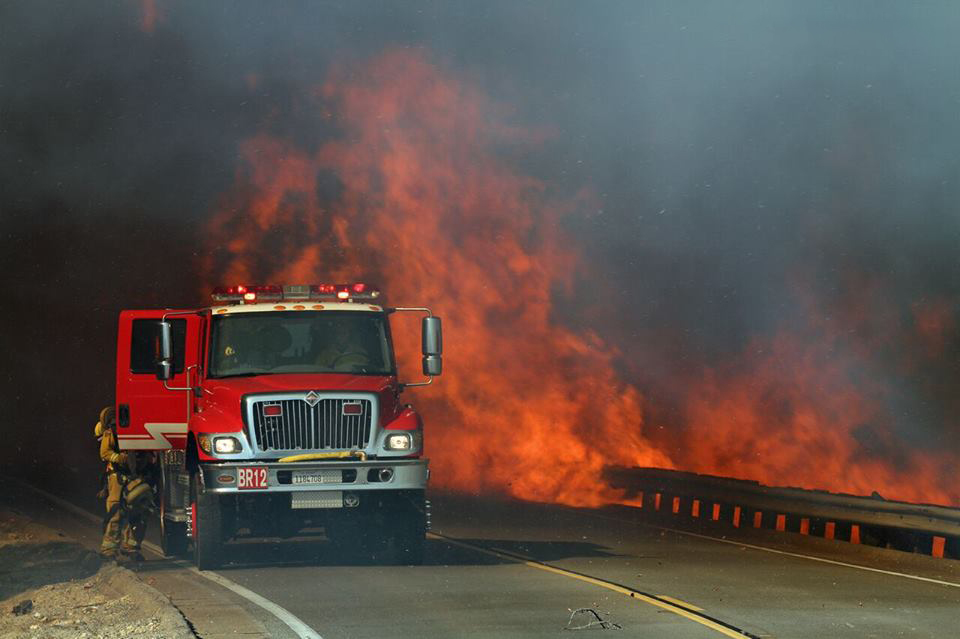
- Picture of the Lilac Fire burning across a highway on December 9, near a firetruck
- Date: December 7, 2017 –; December 16, 2017
- Location: San Diego County, California, United States
- Coordinates: 33.3237°N 117.1630°W

Statistics
- Burned area: 4,100 acres (1,659 ha)

Impacts
- Deaths: None reported
- Injuries: 4 civilians 3 firefighters
- Structures destroyed: 157 destroyed 64 damaged
- Cost: ~$8.9 million (2018 USD)

Ignition
- Cause: Unknown

Map
- Location of the fire in California.

Location of the Lilac Fire

The Lilac Fire was a fire that burned in northern San Diego County, California, United States, and the second-costliest one of multiple wildfires that erupted in Southern California in December 2017. The fire was first reported on December 7, 2017, burned 4,100 acres (1,659 ha), and destroyed 157 structures, before it was fully contained on December 16. The fire cost at least $8.9 million (2018 USD), including $5 million in firefighting expenses and property damage, and an additional $3.9 million in cleanup and erosion control costs. The fire threatened the communities of Bonsall, Oceanside, Vista, Fallbrook, and Camp Pendleton. During the fire, an estimated 10,000 residents were forced to evacuate, while a total of over 100,000 residents were forced to or advised to evacuate. On December 7, the Lilac Fire also cut the power to 20,000 people.

== Events ==
The Lilac Fire was reported on December 7, 2017, at 11:15 am PST, as a small brush fire, just off Interstate 15. The fire was spotted near Old Highway 395 and Dulin Road, near the intersection between State Route 76 and Interstate 15, in Bonsall, San Diego County, California. Fanned by unusually powerful Santa Ana winds, with gusts reaching 66 mph (106 km/h), the wildfire quickly grew in size; within minutes, the wildfire grew to 50 acres. By 11:35 AM PST, the Lilac Fire had reached 500 acres (200 ha). The winds pushed the fire west towards Oceanside and Vista. During that afternoon, the Lilac Fire left nearly 20,000 San Diego Gas & Electric customers without power. The Lilac Fire expanded to 4,100 acres (1,659 ha) by the evening, with 0% containment. Around that time, there were concerns that the Lilac Fire could burn all the way to the Pacific Ocean, near Camp Pendleton.

On the day the fire was reported, Governor Jerry Brown declared a state of emergency for San Diego County, due to the fire, stating, “The fire is very dangerous and spreading rapidly, but we’ll continue to attack it with all we’ve got. It's crucial residents stay ready and evacuate immediately if told to do so.”

Cal State San Marcos, Palomar College, and MiraCosta College canceled classes and closed for the rest of the week. Mandatory evacuations were issued for areas of Bonsall and Oceanside, California. Cal Fire reports that "the fire is growing at a dangerous rate of spread with structures threatened." Three people were injured, including two horse handlers who suffered burns and a deputy from the San Diego County Sheriff's Department who was injured while directing traffic. The fire burned the San Luis Rey Training Center, destroying eight barns and killing 46 horses.

On the morning of December 8, the fire remained at 4,100 acres (1,700 ha) and 0% containment, and 105 buildings had been destroyed. One more civilian and a firefighter were hospitalized due to smoke inhalation, and another firefighter was treated for a dislocated shoulder. Later that evening, a shift in the wind direction and an increase in humidity allowed firefighters to make progress on the fire, increasing containment of the fire to 15%. During the evening, the Santa Ana winds returned to the region. During the afternoon of December 9, a woman was arrested for looting a home in Bonsall, within the mandatory evacuation zone.

On December 10, the Lilac Fire's burn area remained at 4,100 acres (1,659 ha), with containment increasing to 75%. Assessments revealed that the fire had destroyed 151 buildings, while damaging 56 others. Despite strong Santa Ana winds picking up again across Southern California and near the Lilac Fire, the winds failed to materialize around the Lilac Fire's burn area, which allowed firefighters to make significant progress on containing the fire. Firefighters strengthened containment lines with the help of good weather. Due to the increase in fire containment, and the waning Santa Ana winds, all evacuation orders and road closures for the Lilac Fire were lifted at about 4:00 PM PST on December 10. On December 11, the Lilac Fire was 90% contained, with no further increases in size.

On December 14, containment of the Lilac Fire had increased to 98%. During the early afternoon of Friday, December 15, smoke was spotted near the location where the Lilac Fire had started, under a bridge on Interstate 15. However, by 1:22 pm PST on the same day, CalFire reported that the situation had been brought under control.

Early on December 16, it was reported that the Lilac Fire had been fully contained, with the final burn area remaining at a size of 4,100 acres (1,700 ha).

== Impacts ==
=== Evacuations ===
During the Lilac Fire, mandatory evacuations were issued for the following areas. All of the evacuation orders were lifted by 4:00 pm PST on December 10.

Bonsall

- W. Lilac Rd. & Sullivan Middle School
- South of Burma Rd.
- East of Wilshire
- North of N. River Rd.
- West of S. Mission Ave.
- South of Reche Rd.
- West of Interstate 15
- East of Green Canyon Rd. and S. Mission Rd.
- North of Highway 76

Oceanside

- North of Bobier Dr., east of Melrose Dr. north of Santa Fe Ave., and east of College Blvd.
- South of N. River Rd., north of Bobier Dr., East of Melrose Dr. and N. Santa Fe Ave., West of E. Vista Way
- Areas east of Douglas Dr. and north of N. River Rd.
- West of Wilshire Rd., north of River Rd., east of Douglas Dr., and south of the Camp Pendleton fence line

Evacuation warnings were issued for areas North of Pala Rd., South of Reche Rd., West of Interstate 15 east of Green Canyon Rd. & W. Mission Rd.

Evacuation centers included: Pala Casino Resort and Spa, Great Oak High School, Fallbrook High School, East Valley Community Center in Escondido, Bostonia Park and Recreation Center in El Cajon, Oceanside High School, Palomar College, and Stagecoach Community Park in Carlsbad. The Del Mar Fairgrounds and the San Diego Polo Club opened to large animal evacuations.

=== Road closures ===
Until December 10, the following road closures were in effect:

- S. Mission Rd. at Winterhaven Rd. to southbound traffic
- Gopher Canyon Rd. from E. Vista Way to Little Gopher Canyon Rd.
- State Road 76 from Old Hwy 395 to Via Monserate
- W. Lilac Rd. from Old Hwy 395 to Camino Del Rey
- Camino Del Ray at State Road 76 to Old Hwy 395
- Old River Rd. at Little Gopher Canyon Rd. through Golf Club Dr.
- Olive Hill Road from Burma to State Route 76

== Investigation ==
After the Lilac Fire had started, authorities began investigating the source of the fire. Soon after the Lilac Fire had ignited, multiple motorists reported spotting a thin line of fire off Interstate 15, with the flames about 1 foot high and no longer than "a double-wide bed." Although investigators managed to narrow the origin point of the Lilac Fire down to a 1-square-foot area, they were unable to find anything that they could use to determine the fire's cause. Despite the many reports they received from motorists near the start of the fire, investigators were still unable to find a solid lead on the fire's cause. Investigators stated that the cause of the Lilac Fire may never be known without more tips from the public, but also stated that whoever started the fire may have done so unknowingly; a truck that was generating sparks from dragging a metal chain is a possible cause.

== Lilac Fire 2 ==
The small sequel to the Lilac Fire, also known as Lilac Fire happened on January 21, 2025.

== See also ==
- 2017 California wildfires
- May 2014 San Diego County wildfires
- October 2007 California wildfires
  - Witch Fire
- Cedar Fire (2003)
