= Jeremiah Kose =

American football player (born 1993)

No. 48, 52
- Position: Linebacker

Personal information
- Born: January 12, 1993 (age 33); Oceanside, California, U.S.
- Listed height: 6 ft 2 in (1.88 m)
- Listed weight: 230 lb (104 kg)

Career information
- High school: Vista (Vista, California)
- College: Palomar (2011); Montana (2012–2015)

Career history
- 2016: Ottawa Redblacks
- 2017–2018: Edmonton Eskimos

Awards and highlights
- Grey Cup champion (2016); 2× Third-team All-Big Sky (2014–2015)
- Stats at CFL.ca

Jeremiah Pentila Kose (born January 12, 1993) is an American former professional football linebacker who played for the Ottawa Redblacks and Edmonton Eskimos of the Canadian Football League (CFL). He played college football at Montana.

== Early life ==
Kose played high school football at Vista High School in Vista, California. He was a team captain his junior and senior years. He was the team's defensive MVP and earned first-team All-CIF San Diego Section honors his senior year.

== College career ==
Kose played junior college football at Palomar College in 2011. He recorded 88 tackles and five sacks for the Comets.

He transferred to the University of Montana to play for the Montana Grizzlies from 2012 to 2015. He redshirted in 2012 while still recovering from an injury he suffered at Palomar College. Kose played in two games in 2013 before suffering a season-ending injury. He started all but one game during the 2014 season, totaling 117 tackles, one sack, one forced fumble, four pass breakups, and two interceptions, earning third-team All-Big Sky Conference honors. He started all 13 games in 2015 and made 123 tackles, garnering third-team All-Big Sky recognition for the second consecutive year. Kose was also invited to the NFLPA Senior Bowl.

== Professional career ==
=== Ottawa Redblacks ===
Kose was signed to the practice roster of the Ottawa Redblacks of the Canadian Football League (CFL) on September 26, 2016. He was promoted to the active roster on October 12. He dressed in one game for the Redblacks, totaling two special teams tackles, before being placed on the injured list on October 18 and spending the remainder of the season there. On November 27, 2016, the Redblacks won the 104th Grey Cup against the Calgary Stampeders. Kose was released by the Redblacks on May 1, 2017.

=== Edmonton Eskimos ===
Kose signed with the Edmonton Eskimos on June 3, 2017. He was released on June 18, and later signed to the team's practice roster on August 21. He was released again on September 12. Kose signed a future contract with the Eskimos on November 18, 2017.

He was released by the Eskimos again on June 10, 2018, and signed to the practice roster on July 30. He was promoted to the active roster on August 1 and dressed in one game for the Eskimos before being moved back to the practice roster on August 8. Kose was released for the final time on August 13, 2018.

== Coaching career ==
After serving as a defensive assistant at Sacramento State, Kose became the linebackers coach and recruiting coordinator at Fresno City College in 2026.
