= Rancho Buena Vista High School =

Coordinates: 33°09′50.11″N 117°14′50.57″W

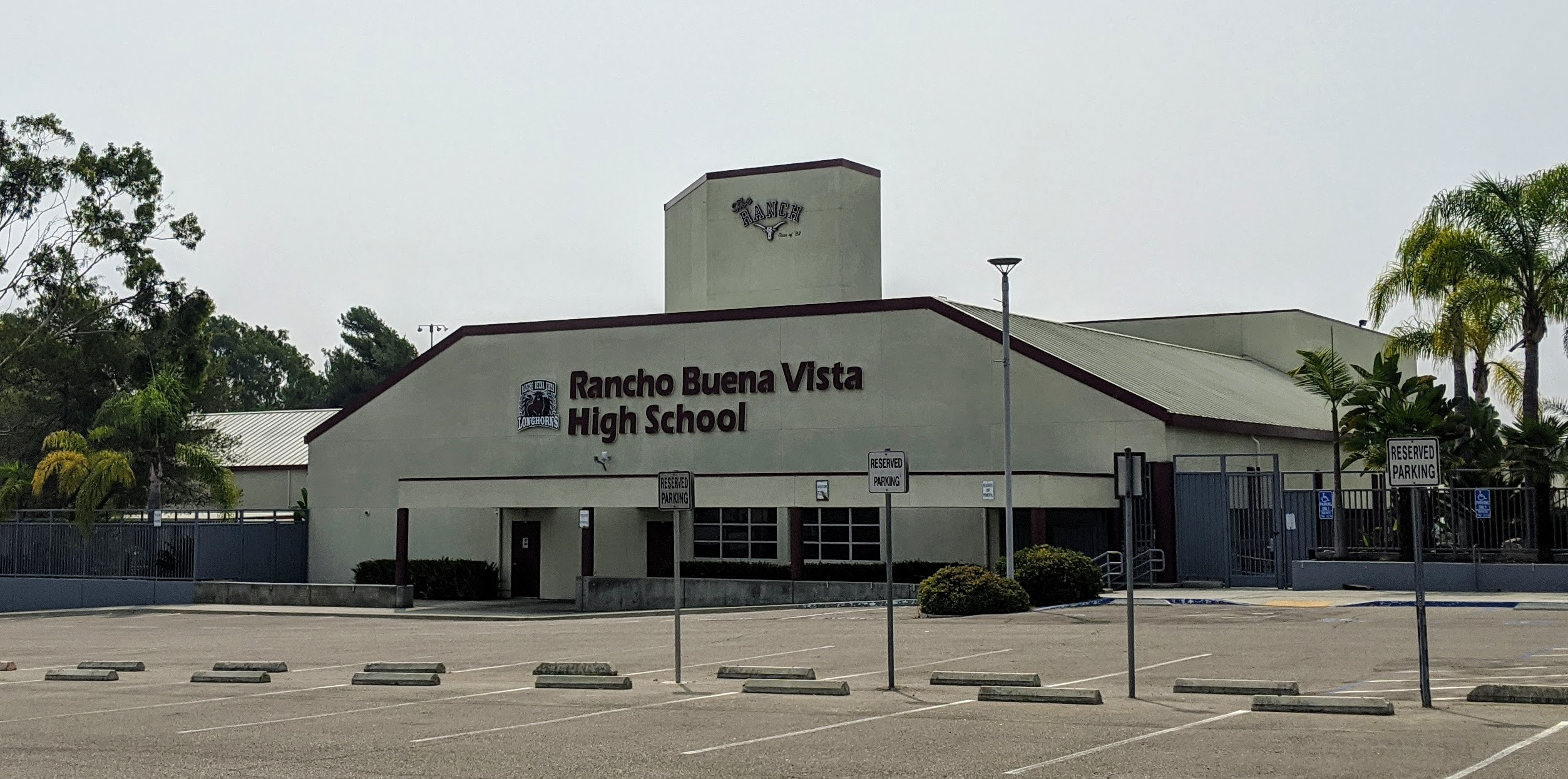
- Main building of Rancho Buena Vista High School in 2020
- 1601 Longhorn Drive; Vista, California; United States

Information
- Type: Public School
- Motto: Excellence through Unity!
- Established: 1988
- School district: Vista Unified School District
- Principal: José Villarreal
- Teaching staff: 102.79 (FTE)
- Grades: 9–12
- Enrollment: 1,949 (2024-2025)
- Student to teacher ratio: 18.96
- Colors: Maroon and silver
- Mascot: Longhorn
- Accreditation: Blue Ribbon
- Newspaper: The Bull's Eye
- Website: Rancho Buena Vista High School Website

Rancho Buena Vista High School or "RBV" is a California Distinguished School and International Baccalaureate Organization World School, located in Vista, California. In the 1990–1991 and 1994–1995 school years Rancho Buena Vista High School was awarded the Blue Ribbon School Award of Excellence by the United States Department of Education, the highest award an American school can receive. It has a 7/10 GreatSchools rating and a 90% 4-year graduation rate.

== History ==
Rancho Buena Vista High School, often shortened locally to "RBV," "Rancho," or "The Ranch," was opened in September 1987. It is a comprehensive, public secondary school in the Vista Unified School District. It is one of the largest schools in San Diego County with over 2,700 enrolled students. As of January 2015, Rancho Buena Vista High School is one of the 761 schools in the United States offering the International Baccalaureate Diploma Programme. It was the first school in the State of California to adopt this rigorous program of study.

The school's mascot is the Longhorn, and its colors are maroon and silver. The logo was modified in 2014 due to the resemblance to that of the University of Texas.

On the retirement of Charles Shindler, Joseph Clevenger was appointed as principal 2019, with assistant principals Daniel Smutz, Christine Corroa, and Rafael Loza. Clevenger is an alumnus of Rancho Buena Vista High School and was previously the principal of a middle school in Bonsall, and assistant principal of Elsinore High School before that.

== Activities ==
Known for yearly participation in the National History Day competition, an annual United Service Organizations (USO) show, and its ArtSplash festival, RBV has programs in theatre, music, and graphic design/digital arts. RBV won first or second place in at least half the shows entered in the California Educational Theatre Awards and the Spirit of the MACY awards.

The school has a TV/film studio equipped with professional JVC cameras.

Rancho Buena Vista's drum line has performed in Good Morning San Diego.

Many students participate in a large internship programme, AVID (Advancement Via Individual Determination), the Regional Occupational Program (ROP), IB Diploma and Certificate Programmes and Advanced Placement (AP) classes.

Rancho's Cross Country teams are perennially state-ranked, and the varsity Academic Team won the San Diego County Academic League Championship in 2006.

=== Sports ===
The athletic program at RBVHS currently offers Marching Band, Color Guard, Cheer, Dance, Ballet Folklorico, Cross Country, Field Hockey, Tennis, Volleyball, Water Polo, Golf, Basketball, Soccer, Wrestling, Softball, Baseball, Swimming, Track & Field, and Football.

In January 2024 Terrence McKinnie was appointed as head football coach replacing Shane Graham, who spent 4 years at the position. Since 2004 the RBV football team had winning seasons in 2007, 2013 and 2017.

== Statistics ==
Staff & Select Enrollment (2006–2007 data)

- Number of full-time paraprofessional staff: 3
- Number of full-time office/clerical staff: 12
- Number of full-time other staff: 16
- Total Classroom Teachers: 131

Number of students (2009–2010 data)

- Total students: 3,061
- 50.7% Male / 49.3% Female
- Grade 9: 752 students
- Grade 10: 815 students
- Grade 11: 794 students
- Grade 12: 700 students

Student % by Ethnicity

- 1% American Indian
- 6% Asian
- 35% Hispanic
- 7% Black
- 50% White
- 1% Unknown

== Criminal issues ==
In 2018, Tay Christopher Cooper, a former social studies teacher at Rancho Buena Vista, pleaded guilty to possession of child pornography. He is serving time in a federal prison, and is also being investigated for child abuse.

A former speech therapist at Rancho Buena Vista was arrested in 2019 for allegedly sending threatening messages to co-workers.

== In popular culture ==
Rancho Buena Vista High School is featured in the video game Tony Hawk's Pro Skater 2 (2000), based on San Diego native Tony Hawk. The school's Longhorn emblem is displayed on the wall of one of the buildings in the "School II" level.

== Notable alumni ==
- Brooke Andersen (2013), track and field champion, hammer thrower, Pan American Games silver medalist
- Joseph Clevenger, school administrator; superintendent of Bonsall Unified School District
- Jesse English (2002), MLB pitcher
- Brandon Halsey, school wrestling record for wins at 150–16; professional mixed martial artist
- Eric Kunze (1990), Broadway actor and singer
- Deven May (1989), Broadway actor and performer
- Jamahl Mosley (1996), NBA head coach of Orlando Magic
- Dave Roberts (1990), manager of the Los Angeles Dodgers
- Victor Santa Cruz (1990), former head football coach, Azusa Pacific University
- Tony Wolters (2010), catcher for Colorado Rockies
