= Mission Vista High School =

High school in California's Vista Unified School District

Coordinates: 33.2563°N 117.2640°W

- 1306 Melrose Drive; Oceanside, California; United States

Information
- Type: Public School
- Motto: Be the change
- Established: 2009
- School district: Vista Unified School District
- Principal: Jeremy Walden
- Teaching staff: 76.21 (FTE)
- Grades: 9-12
- Student to teacher ratio: 21.91
- Colors: Green, Silver, Black, and White
- Mascot: Timberwolf
- Website: Mission Vista High School Website

Mission Vista High School is a public, comprehensive, dual-magnet high school in Oceanside, California. It is part of Vista Unified School District. The school currently serves 1,725 students and has been accredited by the Western Association of Schools and Colleges (WASC) through 2025. The school was established in 2009 on the former Washington Middle School campus (now Vista Innovation and Design Academy), but was officialized at its new dedicated campus in early 2011.

Mission Vista High School operates on a “4x4” block schedule, in which students are enrolled in eight classes per school year. The year is split into two terms (Fall and Spring), and students take four classes per term. By utilizing this schedule, students can quickly take multiple classes per school year without having to take all six to eight classes every day as is the case with other traditional high schools.

In 2017, the school received the California Gold Ribbon Schools Award and in 2019, the school received the distinction award from the Magnet Schools of America.

The founding principal for this school is Rodney Goldenberg, and its current principal Jeremy Walden.

== School layout ==
The current campus of Mission Vista High School was dedicated in early 2011, two years after the school itself was established in the former Washington Middle School campus. The school itself is built on a hill, and has one entrance and one exit for students, faculty, and visitors. Every building on campus (excluding the gymnasium and performing arts theater) is of a rectangular, one-story design that usually is designed to complement the teachers and subject studies that occupy the classrooms.

== Academics ==
The school is one of the top 3% high schools for academics, with an emphasis on Arts & Communication/Science & Technology. It offers eighteen Advanced Placement courses, and thirteen Honors courses. Students also take courses in core curricular areas as electives, such as Psychology, Creative Writing, A Socio-Political History of Rock and Roll, Computer Science, Human Anatomy, Project Lead the Way Biomedical Sciences and Engineering, Choir, Art and Drama. The school does not have a dedicated marching band; it instead features multiple classes that focus on the use of the steel drum.

As part of the school's academic “sports” program, there is a Speech and Debate class, team, and club; there are also three academic teams that function as extracurricular clubs. All of these teams compete in their respective tournaments (the Speech and Debate team competes in tournaments from the San Diego Imperial Valley Speech League).

== Athletics ==
The school has teams in certain sports such as basketball, baseball, softball, volleyball, track, cross-country, field hockey, golf, and soccer.

Mission Vista High School has been CIF Champions in the following sports and years: Boys Basketball (2015–16), Field Hockey (2017), Boys Soccer (2019), Girls Basketball (2019), and Softball (2019), Boys Volleyball (2024).

== Location ==
The school is located at 1306 Melrose Drive, Oceanside, CA 92057, and is just off of SR 76 and the San Luis Rey River in eastern Oceanside, California. It is located within California's 49th congressional district and can educate students living in the cities of Oceanside, Vista, Carlsbad, San Marcos, Bonsall, Fallbrook, and Escondido.
