= Vista Unified School District =

School district in California, United States

Location
- 1234 Arcadia Ave Vista, California, 92084; United States
- Coordinates: 33.2262°N 117.2222°W

District information
- Type: Public
- Grades: Pre-school–12
- Established: 1936
- Superintendent: Dr. Matt Doyle
- Asst. superintendent(s): Ami Shackelford, Rachel D'Ambroso
- Accreditation: Western Association of Schools and Colleges
- Schools: 34
- NCES District ID: 0641190

Students and staff
- Students: 20,634
- Teachers: 981
- Staff: 1,022
- Student–teacher ratio: 26.36

Other information
- Board of Directors: Rosemary Smithfield; Martha Alvarado; Debbie Morton; Cipriano Vargas; Julie Kelly
- Website: www.vistausd.org

Vista Unified School District is a public school district headquartered in Vista, California, United States. It serves sections of northern San Diego County.

The Vista Unified School District is the 4th largest school district in San Diego County and includes 32 schools with diverse educational programs for kindergarten through adult education students. VUSD has 17 elementary schools, three magnet schools, four middle schools, three comprehensive high schools, three alternative high schools, two special education schools and one adult school. VUSD serves more than 23,000 students and 2,000 adult education students in Vista, as well as sections of Oceanside, San Marcos, Carlsbad and some unincorporated areas of the county.

== Schools ==
=== K-12 Academies ===
- Guajome Park Academy

=== High schools ===
- Alta Vista High School (AVHS)
- Major General Raymond Murray High School (MGRMHS)
- Mission Vista High School (MVHS)
- Rancho Buena Vista High School (RBVHS)
- Vista High School (VHS)
- Trade Tech High School (Charter)
- Guajome Park Academy (Charter)

=== Middle schools ===
- Madison Middle School (MMS)
- Rancho Minerva Middle School (RMMS)
- Roosevelt Middle School (RMS)
- Vista Visions Academy (VVA)
- Vista Magnet Middle School (VMMS)
- Vista Innovation & Design Academy (VIDA)
- Washington Middle School (defunct, successor is VIDA)
- Guajome Park Academy (Charter)
- Bella Mente Academy (Charter)

=== Elementary schools ===
- Alamosa Park
- Beaumont
- Bella Mente Montessori Academy (Charter)
- Bobier
- Breeze Hill
- California Ave
- Casita Center
- Empresa
- Foothill Oak
- Grapevine
- Guajome Park Academy (Charter)
- Hannalei
- Lake
- Maryland
- Mission Meadows
- Monte Vista
- North Star Academy
- THE Leadership Academy (formerly Temple Heights)
- Vista Academy of Performing Arts (VAPA)

== Budget crisis ==
The district is not currently in a budget crisis. The budget is balanced for the next two school years.

Budget problems will surely exist throughout the state as businesses closed during the pandemic, reducing state tax revenue. The state is also experiencing declining enrollment as a whole in public schools.
