= Travis Goethel =

American football player (born 1987)

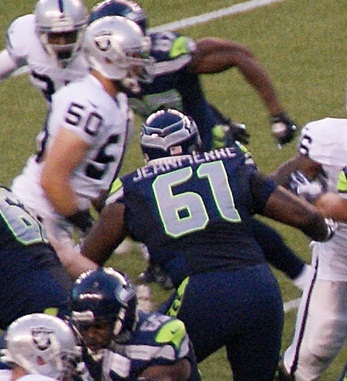
- Goethel (#50) being blocked by Lemuel Jeanpierre (#61) of the Seahawks

No. 50
- Position: Linebacker

Personal information
- Born: July 27, 1987 (age 39); Oceanside, California, U.S.
- Listed height: 6 ft 2 in (1.88 m)
- Listed weight: 255 lb (116 kg)

Career information
- High school: Vista (Vista, California)
- College: Arizona State
- NFL draft: 2010: 6th round, 190th overall pick

Career history
- Oakland Raiders (2010−2012)

Awards and highlights
- Pac-10 All-Freshman (2006)

Career NFL statistics
- Total tackles: 11
- Stats at Pro Football Reference

Travis Peter Goethel (born July 27, 1987) is an American former professional football player who was a linebacker for the Oakland Raiders of the National Football League NFL). He played college football for the Arizona State Sun Devils and was selected by the Oakland Raiders in the sixth round of the 2010 NFL draft.

== Early life ==
Goethel attended Vista High School in Vista, California. As a junior, he recorded 155 tackles, including 14 tackles for loss, 8 quarterback sacks, and 5 interceptions, two which he returned for touchdowns. He was rated as high as the No.10 linebacker in the country by Rivals.com. He picked Arizona State over scholarship offers from Oregon State, Utah and Washington.

== College career ==
He played in all 50 games over his four-year career at Arizona State, including 41 starts. He totaled 228 tackles (143 solo), 19.0 tackles for loss, 2.0 sacks, nine pass break-ups, three interceptions, three forced fumbles and one fumble recovery in his career. He was an Honorable Mention Pac-10 All selection in his senior season, and in his freshman season, garnered Pac-10 All freshman honors and honorable mention Freshman All-American.

== Professional career ==
Goethel was selected by the Oakland Raiders in the sixth round (190th overall) of the 2010 NFL draft. In addition to his normally assigned position as linebacker, Goethel served as a backup long snapper.

During the 2012 season opener, regular long snapper Jon Condo suffered a concussion, forcing Goethel into duty. Out of his 4 snaps, 3 resulted in blocked punts against the San Diego Chargers. Oakland Raiders head coach Dennis Allen defended Goethel, who had not long snapped since high school, by stating he had not been prepared during full-team drills.

On July 23, 2013, Goethel was waived by the Oakland Raiders.

== The Onion article ==
Shortly after he was selected in 2010, Goethel was the subject of an article by satirical publication The Onion saying that the Raiders selected him to be a realtor. Ironically, Goethel's fictional "switch to realtor" was described as being "better than being asked to switch to […] long snapper," when Goethel would in fact gain infamy for his struggles as Oakland's long snapper in 2012.
