= Vista High School (Vista, California) =

- 1 Panther Way; Vista, California; United States

Information
- Type: Public school
- Established: 1936
- School district: Vista Unified School District
- Principal: Megan Ratliff
- Teaching staff: 100.41 (FTE)
- Grades: 9-12
- Student to teacher ratio: 18.88
- Colors: Black and white (red as an alternate color)
- Mascot: Panther
- Rival: Rancho Buena Vista
- Website: Vista High School website

Vista High School is a public high school in Vista, California, United States. Vista is located in North San Diego County. Vista Unified School District encompasses a large geographic area. As such, it serves the needs of students from the cities of Vista, Bonsall, San Marcos, Oceanside, and Carlsbad. Vista High School is one of the largest schools in California, holding over 3,000 students, though its current campus was originally built in 1972 to educate 1,200 students. It was first established in 1936.

== Academics ==
In 1982, VHS was the first high school in San Diego County to adopt the International Baccalaureate Program.

== Athletics ==
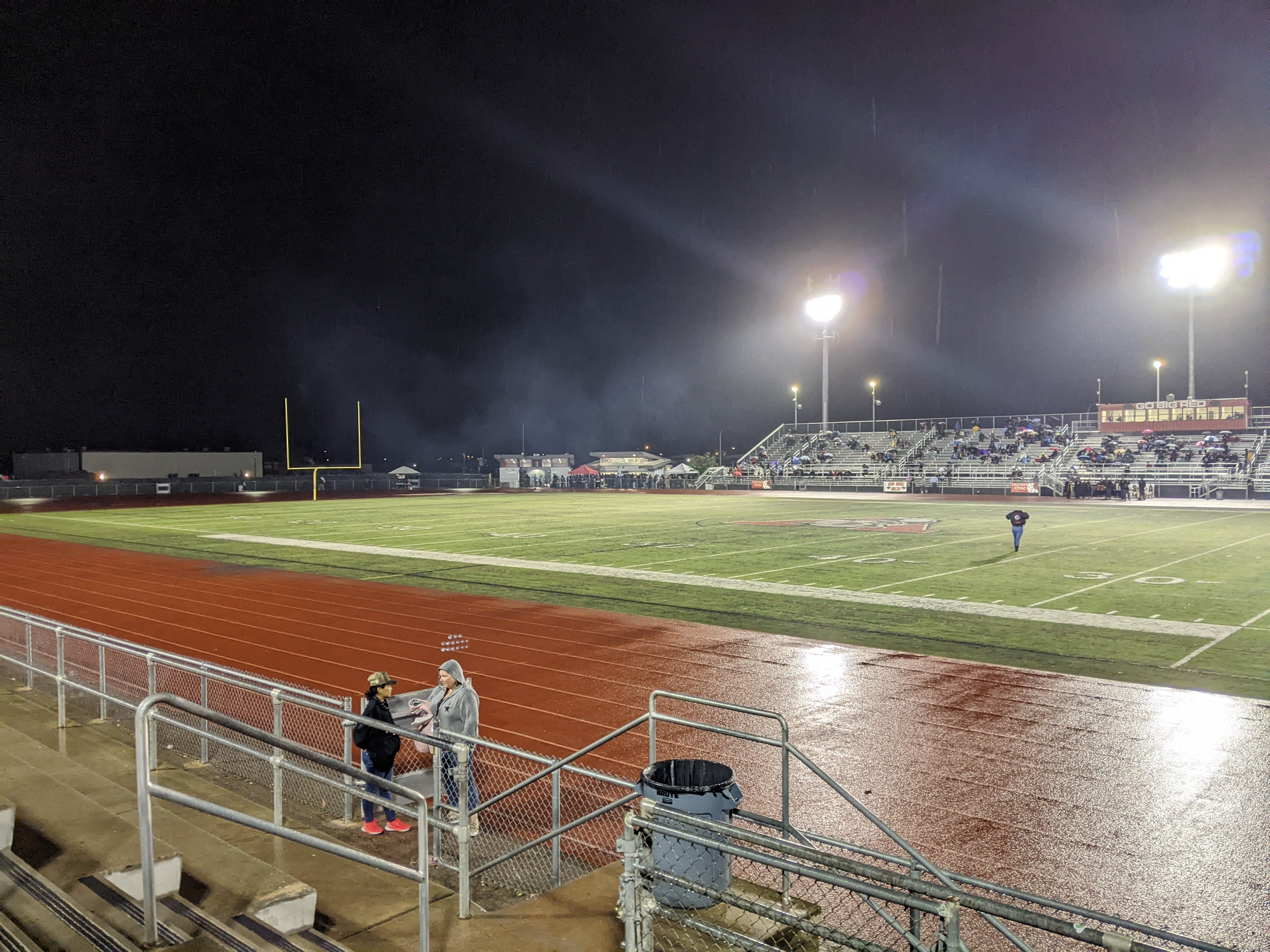
Vista High School's Stadium in 2022

The school's football stadium is named after former coach Dick Haines, a successful Vista High coach who led the 1974 and 1985 Vista High School football teams to state championships. The Panthers have won the CIF championship nine times. To date, the school has produced five NFL players.

== Notable alumni ==
- Russell Allen, Jacksonville Jaguars linebacker
- Sal Aunese, University of Colorado Quarterback
- Trevor Cahill, San Francisco Giants pitcher
- Michael Damian, singer, songwriter & actor.
- Travis Goethel, Oakland Raiders linebacker
- Lorena Gonzalez, State Assemblywoman for California's 80th State Assembly district
- Leon Hall, Cincinnati Bengals, cornerback
- Jeremiah Kose, CFL linebacker
- Korey Lee, Houston Astros, catcher
- Karenssa LeGear, actress
- Wes Littleton, Seattle Mariners pitcher
- Michael Lumpkin, Assistant Secretary of Defense, Special Operation and Low Intensity Conflict
- Clive Matson, Poet and Creative Writing Teacher
- Stefan McClure, Washington Redskins safety
- Carrie Prejean, Miss California USA 2009
- Cove Reber, Saosin lead singer
- Alan S. Thompson, retired U.S. Navy Vice Admiral and former Director of the U.S. Defense Logistics Agency
- Pisa Tinoisamoa, Chicago Bears linebacker
- Damon Way, DC creator
- Danny Way, x games creator and professional skater
