= The Fallbrook Story =

1952 film

The Fallbrook Story (1952) is a short subject film that tells the story of a water rights battle between the citizens of the Fallbrook, California area and the federal government.

The government wanted to have exclusive rights to the water from the Santa Margarita river for the use of adjacent Camp Pendleton, a U.S. Marine Corps base, in conflict with the established use by local ranchers. At the time film director Frank Capra served on the Board of the local water agency, the Fallbrook Public Utilities District ("FPUD"). He produced the short film (without on screen credit) to tell the story from the ranchers perspective, leading to front page publicity from the Los Angeles Times. As a result, the federal government subsequently withdrew their claim on exclusive use of the water. The film was introduced on camera by Cecil B. DeMille. A copy of the 16mm film is in the archives of the Fallbrook Historical Society.
