= Bonsall Unified School District =

School district in Bonsall, California

Address
- 31505 Old River Road Bonsall, California, 92003; United States

District information
- Type: Public
- Grades: K-12
- Established: February 26, 2013; 13 years ago
- Superintendent: Joseph Clevenger (2021 - present)
- Schools: 5
- Budget: $32,945,000
- NCES District ID: 0601426

Students and staff
- Students: 2,164
- Teachers: 98.66
- Staff: 80.03
- Student–teacher ratio: 21.93

Other information
- Website: www.bonsallusd.com

Bonsall Unified School District (BUSD) is a school district located in the unincorporated community of Bonsall, in northern San Diego County, California.

== History ==
Bonsall Unified School District (BUSD) was established on February 26, 2013 to serve the communities of an 88 square mile area covering portions of Oceanside, Fallbrook, Bonsall and the Pala Indian Reservation. Since its founding, the district has undergone several transformations to meet the evolving needs of the community.

Originally, BUSD operated as a K-8 elementary school district. In response to shifting demographics and the growth of local communities, the district expanded its offerings to include Bonsall High School, which opened its doors in 2014. This expansion was a significant development, enabling BUSD to provide a comprehensive education for students from kindergarten through 12th grade.

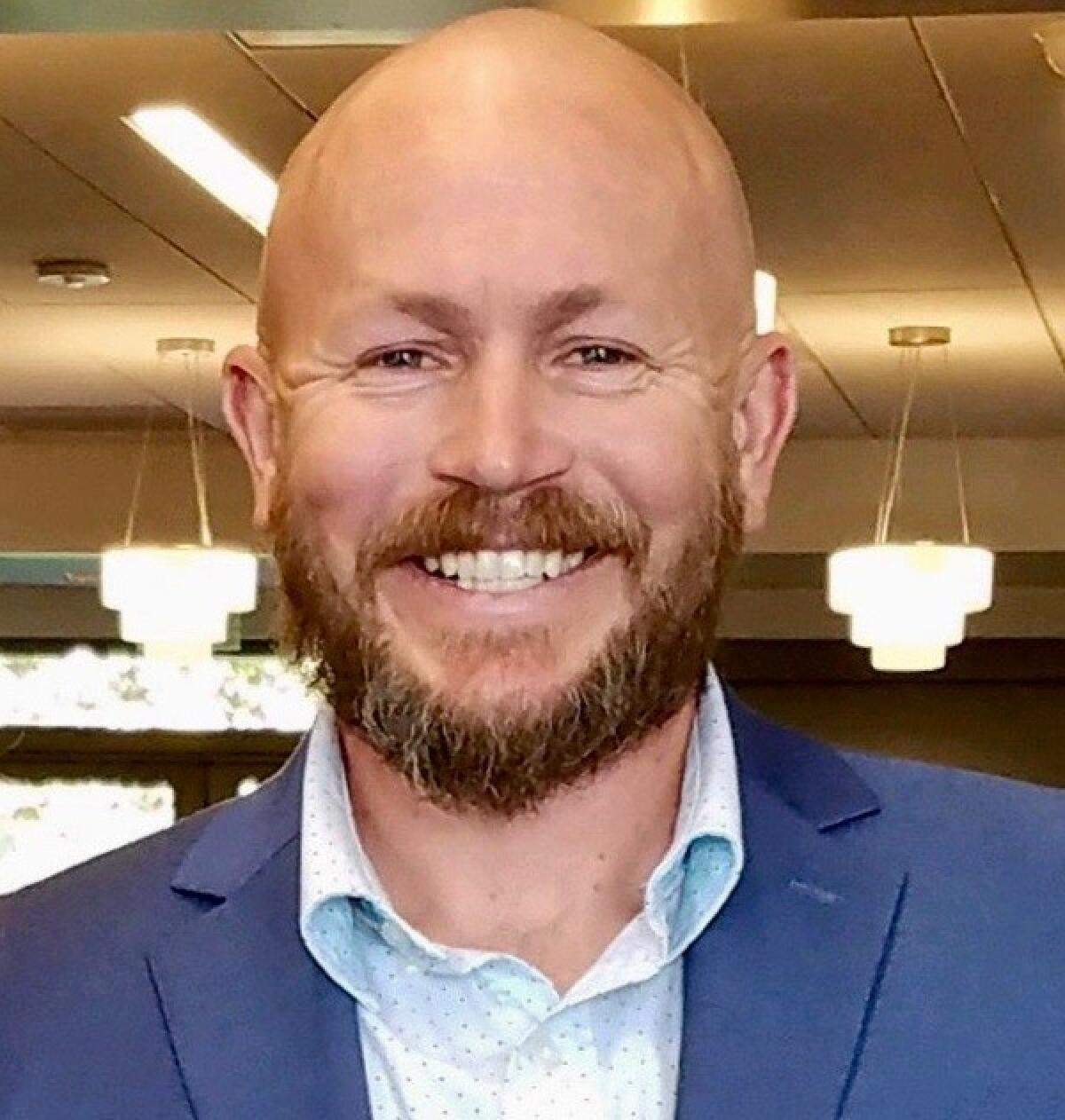
Superintendent Joseph Clevenger

On the retirement of David Jones, Joseph Clevenger was appointed unanimously by the board to serve as superintendent, starting on July 1, 2021. His work as superintendent has included traffic upgrades for schools, improving student performance following the COVID-19 pandemic, and lobbying for the construction of new schools in the district, including a new campus for Bonsall High School and a new elementary school in northern Bonsall.

In March 2023, the California Department of Education recognized 59 schools across the entire state of more than 10,000 schools with the prestigious Purple Star award, awarded to schools that excel in serving and supporting the children of military families and veterans. All five of the schools in Bonsall Unified School District were recipients, an unprecedented occasion that prompted an award ceremony at Bonsall West Elementary School featuring Lieutenant General George W. Smith Jr., Commanding General I Marine Expeditionary Force, and a number of prominent military and community leaders.

== Schools ==
=== High schools ===
- Bonsall High School (BHS)

=== Middle schools ===
- Norman L. Sullivan Middle School (SMS)

=== Elementary schools ===
- Bonsall Elementary School
- Bonsall West Elementary School
- Vivian Banks Charter School

== See also ==
- List of school districts in California
