= Guajome Park Academy =

Location
- 2000 N. Santa Fe Ave. Vista, California 92083; United States; 33°13′46″N 117°15′1″W

Information
- Other names: Guajome or GPA
- Type: Public charter school
- Established: 1994
- Head teacher: Judd Thompson
- Grades: K–12
- Enrollment: 1,385 (2016-17)
- Colors: Teal and black
- Mascot: Frog
- Website: www.guajome.net

Guajome Park Academy /ɡwəˈhoʊmi/ (commonly referred to as Guajome or GPA) is a K–12 public charter school in Vista, California, United States that was established in 1994. It offers the IB Diploma Programme for eleventh and twelfth-graders. During the 2004-2005 school year, 1,238 students were enrolled: 530 in the middle school and 708 in the high school.

The school is named after nearby Guajome County Park. The name "Guajome" comes from the Luiseño Indian word wakhavumi meaning "frog pond". In the Luiseño story of creation, Wahawut was one of the "First People" who took on the appearance of a frog to cast a spell over the god Oiyot; consequently, the school's mascot is a frog.

== History ==
Guajome Park Academy was founded in 1994 by a group of parents and educators headed by "C.E.O." (Chief Educational Officer) Sandra Williamson (later Sandra Williamson-Angle). In its first year, Guajome had no campus of its own, and met at a nearby middle school as well as at Vista High School. The school was one of the first charter schools in California. The following year, a campus consisting of a number of temporary buildings was opened in northern Vista. From 1997 to 2004, the school opened a secondary campus in downtown Vista called the Vista Village Learning Plaza, which at various times has housed the high school program and an alternative education program called the Expeditionary Learning Center (ELC). In 2004, a permanent campus opened at the main campus site, with two-story buildings, a gymnasium, and an amphitheater, facilities the school had not had in any of its previous locations. Soon after, the Vista Village Learning Plaza was closed and the ELC was relocated to the main campus.

Although Guajome has never been a private school, in its early years prospective students and their parents were required to interview with the dean. As the school's population increased, such interviews became less feasible and were eventually discontinued. In recent years, especially following administrative changes in 2003, there has been increasing controversy surrounding what some critics say is a break from the school's original vision of small classroom sizes and a project-based, integrated curriculum. In 2005, a former teacher created the message board Guajome Underground to criticize the administration and discuss educational changes at the school.

== Campus ==
The current campus is located in northern Vista, at the intersection of North Santa Fe Avenue and Museum Way. It is within walking distance of the Antique Gas and Steam Engine Museum, Rancho Guajome Adobe, and Guajome Park; students often take field trips to these locations, and the high school graduations were held at the adobe until the completion of the current campus. The school itself has three two-story buildings, a one-story building, a gymnasium, and an amphitheater. The school was also formerly home to a ropes course.

== Extracurricular activities ==
Guajome's athletic teams include soccer, cross country, track, softball, baseball, basketball, volleyball, tennis and wrestling. The soccer, cross country and wrestling teams have received high awards, performing competitively in League and CIF honors as teams, with numerous individual athletes also earning recognition. The school also participates annually in the North County Academic League and has had some very limited participation in Science Olympiad.

The Guajome Park Academy Yearbook has won 1st (2008), 2nd (2006, 2010, 2011) and 3rd (2007) place ribbons at the San Diego County Fair.

Other extracurricular in arts have dwindled over the years, but are on the rise again. The high school and middle school have a drumline, and the school participates annually in Drums Across California competitions. In 2013, GPA Drumline won the championship at Drums Across California in the Junior Division. GPA Drumline has gone on to win titles again in 2014, 2016, 2018, and 2019. In the fall of 2014, Guajome added string orchestra and choral programs during the school day. Currently, there is no band at Guajome.

Guajome is a member of the German American Partnership Program and has been partnered with its sister school, Gymnasium Ulricianum Aurich, in Aurich, Lower Saxony, Germany since 1995. Most exchange trips consist with a 3 week stay over summer offered for students in 10th grade or above and then the option of staying for a whole semester.

== In popular culture ==
The film To Save a Life was partially filmed at Guajome Park Academy. The school's exterior was used for exterior shots, while the interior shots were of Oceanside High School.

== Notable alumni ==
- Vanessa Hudgens, actress and singer, attended for sixth and seventh grade in 2001
