= Antique Gas and Steam Engine Museum =

Museum in Vista, California

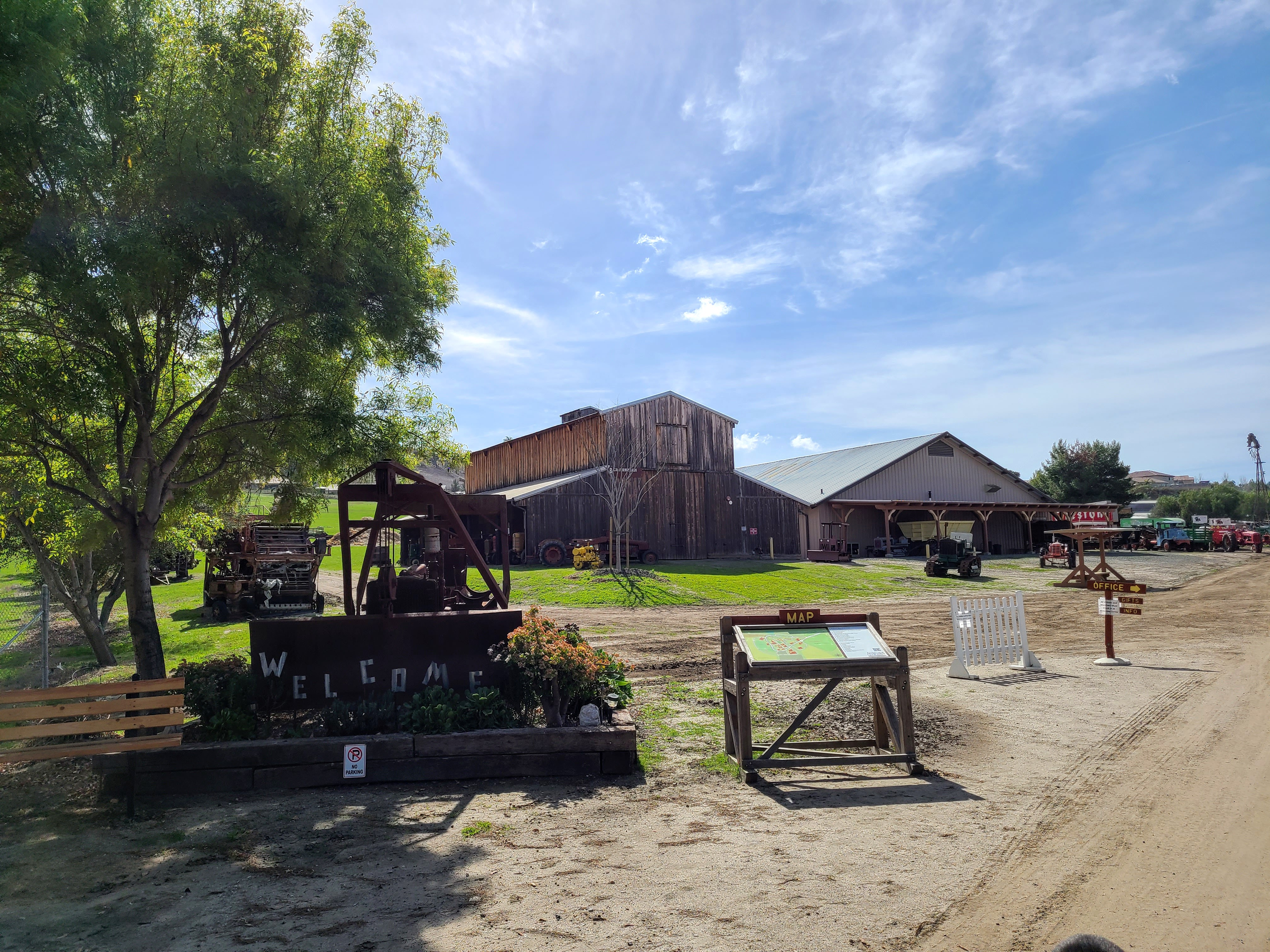
- Entrance to the museum
- Established: 1969
- Location: 2040 N Santa Fe Avenue, Vista, California
- Coordinates: 33°13′42.49″N 117°15′17.17″W
- Website: http://www.agsem.org/

The Antique Gas & Steam Engine Museum (AGSEM) is a living history museum founded in 1969. It is located on 55 acres (220,000 m^{2}) of county-owned land at 2040 N Santa Fe Ave. on the outskirts of Vista, California. The museum is a non-profit 501c(3) organization, run by several paid employees along with volunteer help.

The museum is open almost every day of the year and has two bi-annual shows, on the 3rd and 4th weekends of June and October. The museum also has other public and private events throughout the year.

== Technology museum ==
Gas Engine Row has many large stationary gas engines from the early 1900s. On the row is an operational 15 horsepower (11 kW) Fairbanks-Morse mine hoist winding engine, a pumphouse powered by a 15 horsepower (11 kW) Fairbanks-Morse engine, a 150 horsepower (110 kW) horsepower 1922 Fairbanks-Morse type YV engine connected to a large alternator, an enormous 1914 Chicago-Pneumatic hot-bulb air compressor, an 80 horsepower (60 kW) Western engine, a 120 horsepower (89 kW) Western engine, a 200 horsepower (150 kW) Western engine and many other stationary engines. Almost all of the engines on Gas Engine Row can be seen running during the shows.

Steam Engine Row showcases many different types and sizes of stationary steam engines; from a monstrous 300 horsepower (220 kW) Allis Chalmers Corliss engine with a 12-foot-diameter (3.7 m) flywheel, to a small J. Lefel & Sons portable engine. They are all powered by steam from two large boilers, nicknamed Pat and Rich, after two long-time museum volunteers who maintain and operate them.

=== Steam engines ===
There are six operational steam traction engines on the grounds, with a 1913 Buffalo-Pitts steamroller and a 1909 20 horsepower Case undergoing restoration. The operational steam tractors are an 1895 Russell & Co. 15-30 steam tractor, a 1902 Advance 16-30 steam tractor, a 1912 J.I. Case 60 horsepower (45 kW) steam tractor, a 1920 Minneapolis 20 horsepower (15 kW) steam tractor, and a 1916 15-30 Russell & Co. Most, if not all, of these tractors can be seen steaming around the grounds during the show days.

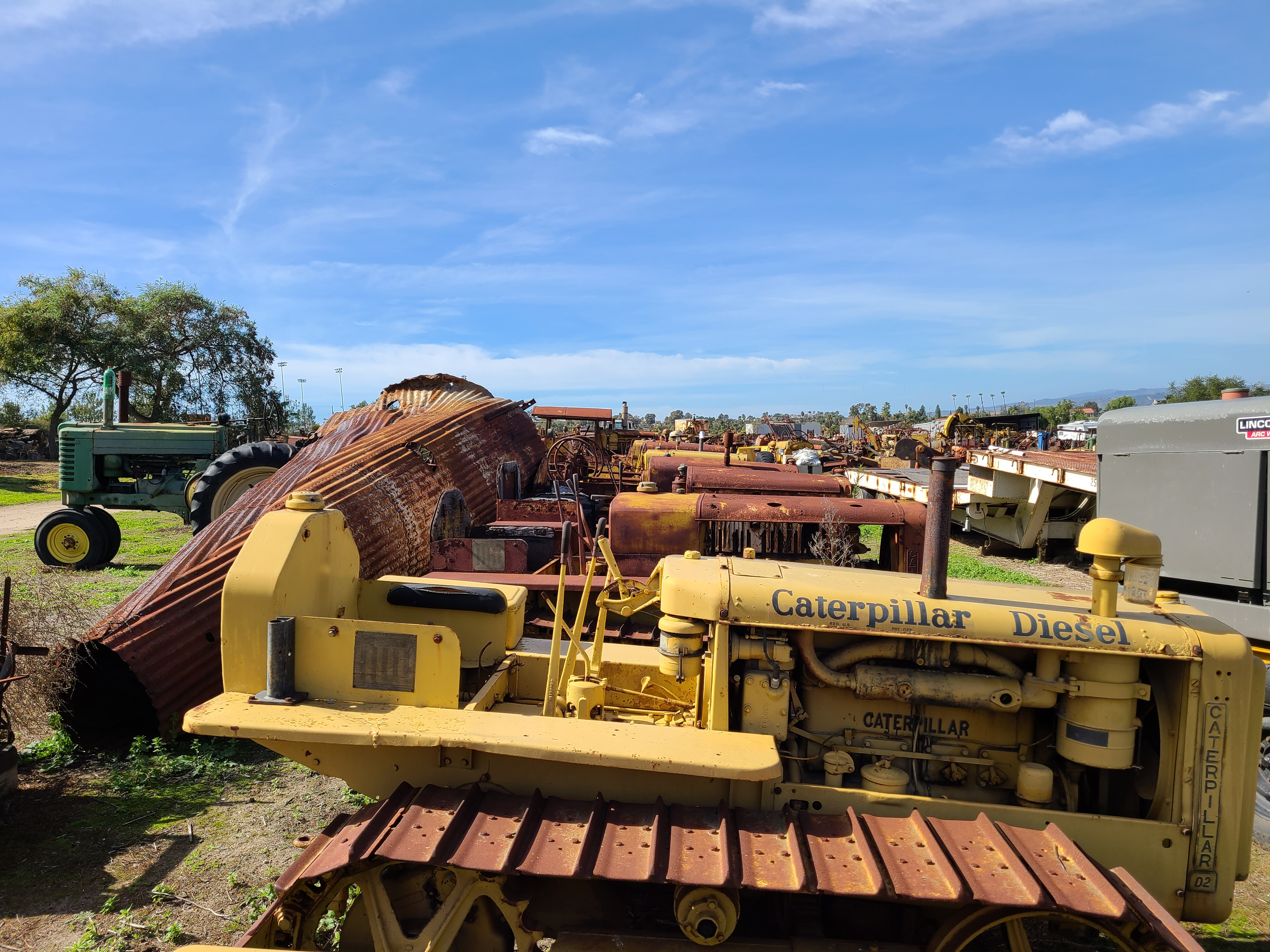
Tractors at the Antique Gas and Steam Engine Museum

=== Tractors ===
The museum is also home to a large number of old tractors. Two D8 Caterpillars, a D9, a few large 1930s Caterpillars, some Best crawlers and many other examples of tracked tractors can be seen at the museum. The typical tractors such as Farmall, John Deere, Oliver, and Allis-Chalmers can be seen out at the museum, but there are more than a few rarer examples too. There is a 1924 Buffalo-Springfield road roller, a gigantic 1918 30-60 Aultman-Taylor gas tractor, a 1911 Fairbanks-Morse 15-25 kerosene tractor, a 1915 International Harvester Mogul 8-16, several Rumely Oil-Pulls, and many more.

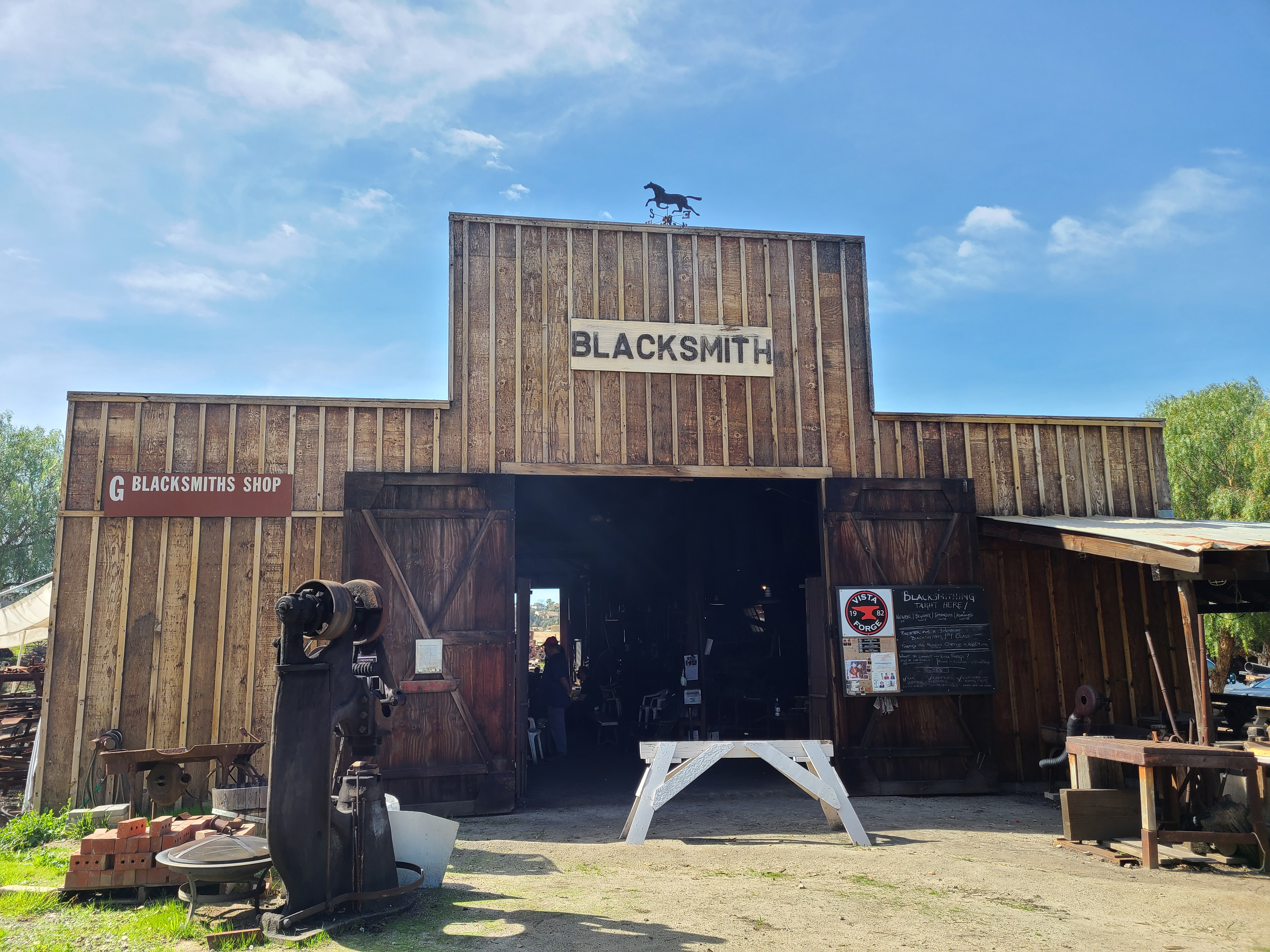
Blacksmith shop

=== Blacksmithing ===
There is an operational blacksmith shop with an operating line shaft setup powered by a 15-horsepower 1917 Mogul gasoline engine. During the show days, there are multiple forges lit, and multiple blacksmiths can be found working pieces of iron into many different things.

=== Model Railroad ===
Also located on museum grounds is the Short Track Model Railroad Club, featuring an NTrak model railroad with trains traveling through more than 40 modules, including a drive-in movie theater, a fairgrounds, farms, towns, and a coal mine and other scenes.

The Short Track, N-Scale, Model Railroad club is an educational organization that seeks to further the appreciation of railroad history in the United States. Many members are also National Model Railroad Association (NMRA) members and a few have earned the title of "Master Modeler." Their Donner Pass, N-scale, model railroad exhibit shows the Southern Pacific crossing of the Sierra Mountains between Colfax, CA and West Reno, NV.

There is also a small layout that can be operated by children (The Young & Victorious RR).

== Textile museum ==
The Museum Weavers are housed in a 4,000-square-foot (370 m^{2}) barn, featuring more than 50 working looms for weaving. Members of this club meet weekly to learn and practice weaving, rug-making and rope-making.

== Mill museum ==
The working gristmill grinds wheat and corn into flour, which is available for sale during the twice-yearly shows. During the summer months, the museum grows sorghum cane, which is made into molasses for the fall show.

== Sawmill ==
The Sawmill is run by a D-3000 Cat diesel engine, Hawthorne Machinery in San Diego provided the cylinder liners. The Sawmill was re-assembled and improved following a donation from the Pederson Brothers who had operated it in the Big Bear area years ago. This is likely the only Sawmill that can be seen operating in San Diego County.

== See also ==
- Category: Museums in San Diego County
