= Bonsall, California =

- Census-designated place
- Location in San Diego County and the state of California

- Location in the United States
- Coordinates: 33°16′47″N 117°11′37″W
- Country: United States
- State: California
- County: San Diego

Area
  - Total: 13.80 sq mi (35.74 km^{2})
  - Land: 13.63 sq mi (35.29 km^{2})
  - Water: 0.17 sq mi (0.45 km^{2}) 1.28%
- Elevation: 180 ft (55 m)

Population (2020)
  - Total: 4,546
  - Density: 333.7/sq mi (128.83/km^{2})
- Time zone: UTC-8 (Pacific)
  - Summer (DST): UTC-7 (PDT)
- ZIP code: 92003
- Area codes: 442/760
- FIPS code: 06-07498
- GNIS feature IDs: 1660358, 2407884

Bonsall is a census-designated place (CDP) in San Diego County, California. The population was 4,546 at the 2020 census, up from 3,982 at the 2010 census.

The Bonsall area was heavily affected by the Lilac Fire in December 2017, which burned 4,100 acres.

== Name ==
The area known as Bonsall was originally called Mount Fairview and had a post office by that name from December 28, 1871, to December 28, 1880. It received a post office in 1881 under the name Osgood, after California Southern Railroad chief engineer Joseph O. Osgood; the renaming was supposedly an unsuccessful attempt to convince Osgood to build the railroad through the San Luis Rey River Valley (the rail line eventually followed the Santa Margarita River instead). Following a contest, the town was renamed Bonsall in 1890, after local minister James A. Bonsall.

== Geography ==
Bonsall is just east of Oceanside and Camp Pendleton, north of Vista and northwest of Hidden Meadows.

According to the United States Census Bureau, the CDP has a total area of 13.6 square miles (35 km^{2}). The 13.4 square miles (35 km^{2}) is land whereas 0.2 square miles (0.52 km^{2}) or (1.28%) is water.

== Demographics ==
Historical population
| Census | Pop. | Note | %± |
|---|---|---|---|
| 1990 | 1,881 | | — |
| 2000 | 3,401 | | 80.8% |
| 2010 | 3,982 | | 17.1% |
| 2020 | 4,546 | | 14.2% |
U.S. Decennial Census; 1860–1870 1880-1890; 1900 1910 1920; 1930 1940 1950; 1960 1970 1980; 1990 2000 2010; 2020

Bonsall was first listed as a census designated place in the 1990 U.S. census.

=== Racial and ethnic composition ===
Bonsall CDP, California – Racial and ethnic composition Note: the US Census treats Hispanic/Latino as an ethnic category. This table excludes Latinos from the racial categories and assigns them to a separate category. Hispanics/Latinos may be of any race.
| Race / Ethnicity (NH = Non-Hispanic) | Pop 2000 | Pop 2010 | Pop 2020-current | % 2000 | % 2010 | % 2020 |
|---|---|---|---|---|---|---|
| White alone (NH) | 2,496 | 2,757 | 2,886 | 73.39% | 69.24% | 63.48% |
| Black or African American alone (NH) | 29 | 59 | 75 | 0.85% | 1.48% | 1.65% |
| Native American or Alaska Native alone (NH) | 8 | 21 | 14 | 0.24% | 0.53% | 0.31% |
| Asian alone (NH) | 89 | 136 | 190 | 2.62% | 3.42% | 4.18% |
| Native Hawaiian or Pacific Islander alone (NH) | 4 | 5 | 10 | 0.12% | 0.13% | 0.22% |
| Other race alone (NH) | 4 | 10 | 17 | 0.12% | 0.25% | 0.37% |
| Mixed race or Multiracial (NH) | 42 | 101 | 257 | 1.23% | 2.54% | 5.65% |
| Hispanic or Latino (any race) | 729 | 893 | 1,097 | 21.43% | 22.43% | 24.13% |
| Total | 3,401 | 3,982 | 4,546 | 100.00% | 100.00% | 100.00% |

=== 2020 census ===
As of the 2020 census, Bonsall had a population of 4,546. The population density was 333.7 inhabitants per square mile (128.8/km^{2}). The median age was 44.7 years. The age distribution was 19.8% under the age of 18, 6.6% aged 18 to 24, 23.9% aged 25 to 44, 26.5% aged 45 to 64, and 23.1% who were 65 years of age or older. For every 100 females, there were 98.6 males, and for every 100 females age 18 and over there were 98.6 males age 18 and over.

2.9% of residents lived in urban areas, while 97.1% lived in rural areas.

The whole population lived in households. There were 1,645 households, of which 28.8% had children under the age of 18 living in them. Of all households, 60.4% were married-couple households, 6.7% were cohabiting couple households, 14.5% had a male householder with no partner present, and 18.4% had a female householder with no partner present. About 19.2% of households were one person, and 9.7% had one person aged 65 or older. The average household size was 2.76. There were 1,227 families (74.6% of all households).

There were 1,789 housing units at an average density of 131.3 units per square mile (50.7 units/km^{2}), of which 1,645 (92.0%) were occupied. Of these, 73.4% were owner-occupied, and 26.6% were occupied by renters. Of all housing units, 8.0% were vacant. The homeowner vacancy rate was 1.6%, and the rental vacancy rate was 4.1%.

=== Income and poverty ===
In 2023, the US Census Bureau estimated that the median household income was $110,316, and the per capita income was $59,884. About 9.9% of families and 15.4% of the population were below the poverty line.

== Education ==
Bonsall is served by the Bonsall Unified School District. consisting of three elementary schools, a middle school, and a high school. Joseph Clevenger has served as superintendent since July 1, 2021.

== Politics ==
In the California State Legislature, Bonsall is in the 40th senatorial district, represented by Republican Brian Jones, and in the 75th Assembly district, represented by Republican Carl DeMaio.

In the United States House of Representatives, Bonsall is in California's 48th congressional district, represented by Republican Darrell Issa.

In June 1988, Bonsall-area voters defeated a ballot initiative to create a Community Services District ("CSD") after opponents argued that the boundaries included too many county taxpayers who more closely associated with neighboring cities Vista and Fallbrook rather than the unincorporated Bonsall community.
