= Fallbrook, California =

- CDP
- Interactive map of Fallbrook, California
- Location in the United States
- Coordinates: 33°22′18″N 117°14′10″W
- Country: United States
- State: California
- County: San Diego
- Settled: 1869

Government
  - Type: Unincorporated
  - County Supervisor: Jim Desmond (R)
  - State Assembly: Carl DeMaio (R); Laurie Davies (R)
  - State Senate: Brian Jones (R)
  - U.S. House: Mike Levin (D); Darrell Issa (R)

Area
  - Total: 17.56 sq mi (45.48 km^{2})
  - Land: 17.54 sq mi (45.43 km^{2})
  - Water: 0.019 sq mi (0.05 km^{2}) 0.10%
- Elevation: 682 ft (208 m)

Population (2020)
  - Total: 32,267
  - Density: 1,840/sq mi (710.3/km^{2})
- Time zone: UTC−8 (Pacific)
  - Summer (DST): UTC−7 (PDT)
- ZIP Codes: 92028, 92088
- Area codes: 442/760
- FIPS code: 06-23462
- GNIS feature IDs: 1652708, 2408113

Fallbrook is an unincorporated census-designated place in northern San Diego County, California, United States. The community had a population of 32,267 at the 2020 United States census, making it one of the largest unincorporated communities in the county. Fallbrook lies immediately east of Marine Corps Base Camp Pendleton and is widely known for its avocado groves; the community styles itself the "Avocado Capital of the World" and hosts an annual Avocado Festival on Main Avenue.

== History ==
Fallbrook was first inhabited by the Payomkawichum people, later renamed Luiseños by the Spanish missionaries who arrived in the area in the late 18th century. Large village sites and oak groves were established by the Luiseños; one site became the area today known as Live Oak County Park.

The first permanent recorded settlement dates to the Mexican period in 1846, when Ysidro Alvarado received the Rancho Monserate grant from then-governor of Alta California, Pío Pico. The 13,323-acre grant stretched from the San Luis Rey River near Bonsall in the south to Stagecoach Lane and the Palomares house in the north, bounded by Mission Road on the west and Monserate Mountain on the east.

Pico's nephew, vaquero José María Pico, was recorded in the area now occupied by Fallbrook Union High School in the 1860 census, and his family registered to vote in October 1868 — in time for the first presidential election after the Civil War.

The first known image of the area is an 1870 oil painting by James Walker titled Roping the Bear at Santa Margarita Rancho, depicting Mexican vaqueros capturing a grizzly bear.

Canadian-born settler Vital Reche later established a homestead with his family just north of Alvarado's ranch at the present-day site of Live Oak Park. The Reches named the new community "Fall Brook" after their former homestead in Pennsylvania.

Native oak trees were the area's original primary tree cover.

Director Frank Capra purchased the historic 536-acre Red Mountain Ranch in Fallbrook in 1939 on the recommendation of his father-in-law Myron "Pop" Warner, after Warner scouted the property while Capra was directing Mr. Smith Goes to Washington. Capra rehabilitated the ranch's neglected 105-acre olive grove, restarted its on-site press, and sold the result by mail order under the label "Fallbrook Olive Oil — Produced by Frank Capra." He served on the board of the Fallbrook Public Utility District from December 1953 until June 1955, during which time he produced the short documentary The Fallbrook Story (1952) for the local Chamber of Commerce in support of the District's Santa Margarita River water-rights litigation against the federal government.

Incorporation as a city was put before voters in 1981 and again in 1987; both ballot measures failed.

On October 21, 2007, wildfires broke out across San Diego County and other parts of Southern California. By October 23, the Rice Canyon Fire had crossed Interstate 15 and spread into eastern Fallbrook along Reche Road, prompting a mandatory evacuation order for all residents. As of October 23, 206 homes, two commercial properties, and 40 outbuildings had burned; these figures included more than 100 homes destroyed in the Valley Oaks Mobile Home Park and Pala Mesa Village condominiums.

== Geography ==
The Fallbrook Community Planning Area encompasses approximately 44 square miles (110 km^{2}). According to the United States Census Bureau, the CDP itself has a total area of 17.6 square miles (46 km^{2}), of which 17.5 square miles (45 km^{2}) is land and 0.02 square miles (0.052 km^{2}) (0.10%) is water.

Native evergreen oak trees are common throughout Fallbrook and form continuous woodland in places such as Live Oak Park. Chaparral brushland is the other dominant native vegetation type. Avocado and Eucalyptus are the most common introduced trees in the area.

=== Climate ===
Fallbrook has a Mediterranean climate (Köppen Csa/Csb transition), with mild, wet winters and warm, dry summers moderated by ocean breezes from the nearby Pacific. Most of the community is frost-free, although low-lying areas occasionally see overnight lows in the low 40s°F during winter. Annual precipitation, almost all of which falls between November and April, averages roughly 14 inches (36 cm) on the valley floor and up to 20 inches (51 cm) in the surrounding hills. The combination of low frost risk, well-drained soils, and ample winter rain makes the area particularly suited for avocado, strawberries, tomatoes, and other subtropical crops.

Climate data for Fallbrook, California, 1991–2020 normals
Month	Jan	Feb	Mar	Apr	May	Jun	Jul	Aug	Sep	Oct	Nov	Dec	Year
Mean daily maximum °F (°C)	67.5 (19.7)	66.7 (19.3)	70.1 (21.2)	72.1 (22.3)	75.2 (24.0)	80.8 (27.1)	87.2 (30.7)	89.3 (31.8)	87.8 (31.0)	83.1 (28.4)	74.3 (23.5)	67.1 (19.5)	76.8 (24.9)
Daily mean °F (°C)	57.4 (14.1)	56.6 (13.7)	59.0 (15.0)	61.3 (16.3)	64.1 (17.8)	68.3 (20.2)	73.6 (23.1)	75.5 (24.2)	74.8 (23.8)	70.8 (21.6)	63.1 (17.3)	56.6 (13.7)	65.1 (18.4)
Mean daily minimum °F (°C)	47.4 (8.6)	46.4 (8.0)	47.9 (8.8)	50.5 (10.3)	52.9 (11.6)	55.9 (13.3)	60.0 (15.6)	61.8 (16.6)	61.7 (16.5)	58.0 (14.4)	51.9 (11.1)	46.1 (7.8)	53.4 (11.9)
Average precipitation inches (mm)	3.17 (81)	3.74 (95)	2.02 (51)	1.00 (25)	0.36 (9.1)	0.12 (3.0)	0.08 (2.0)	0.22 (5.6)	0.11 (2.8)	0.70 (18)	1.15 (29)	2.64 (67)	15.31 (388.5)
Average precipitation days (≥ 0.01 in)	5.7	6.4	6.3	4.2	4.5	2.3	1.6	1.4	1.8	3.1	4.6	6.5	48.4
Source: NOAA

== Demographics ==
Historical population
Census	Pop.	Note	%±
1950	1,735		—
1960	4,814		177.5%
1970	6,945		44.3%
1980	14,041		102.2%
1990	22,095		57.4%
2000	29,100		31.7%
2010	30,534		4.9%
2020	32,267		5.7%
U.S. Decennial Census 1950 1960–1970 1980–1990 2000 2010 2020

Fallbrook was first listed as an unincorporated place in the 1950 U.S. census, and as a census-designated place beginning with the 1980 U.S. census.

=== Racial and ethnic composition ===
Fallbrook CDP, California — Racial and ethnic composition Note: the U.S. Census treats Hispanic/Latino as an ethnic category. This table excludes Latinos from the racial categories and assigns them to a separate category. Hispanics/Latinos may be of any race.
Race / Ethnicity (NH = Non-Hispanic)	Pop 2000	Pop 2010	Pop 2020	% 2000	% 2010	% 2020
White alone (NH)	16,687	15,006	13,608	57.34%	49.15%	42.17%
Black or African American alone (NH)	362	411	462	1.24%	1.35%	1.43%
Native American or Alaska Native alone (NH)	134	107	102	0.46%	0.35%	0.32%
Asian alone (NH)	435	550	718	1.49%	1.80%	2.23%
Native Hawaiian or Pacific Islander alone (NH)	76	57	85	0.26%	0.19%	0.26%
Other race alone (NH)	40	48	138	0.14%	0.16%	0.43%
Mixed race or Multiracial (NH)	513	555	1,114	1.76%	1.82%	3.45%
Hispanic or Latino (any race)	10,853	13,800	16,040	37.30%	45.20%	49.71%
Total	29,100	30,534	32,267	100.00%	100.00%	100.00%

=== 2020 census ===
At the 2020 census, Fallbrook had a population of 32,267 and a population density of 1,839.5 inhabitants per square mile (710.2/km^{2}). The census reported that 98.8% of residents lived in households, 0.8% in non-institutional group quarters, and 0.4% were institutionalized.

The age distribution was 23.6% under 18, 10.1% aged 18 to 24, 24.5% aged 25 to 44, 23.5% aged 45 to 64, and 18.4% aged 65 or older; the median age was 37.4 years. For every 100 females there were 97.5 males, and for every 100 females age 18 and over there were 94.5 males.

There were 10,445 households, 35.4% of which had children under 18. Of all households, 56.2% were married-couple households, 6.8% were cohabiting couple households, 22.7% had a female householder with no partner present, and 14.4% had a male householder with no partner present. About 17.9% of households consisted of individuals living alone, and 9.4% had someone living alone aged 65 or older. The average household size was 3.05. There were 7,961 families (76.2% of all households).

There were 10,866 housing units at an average density of 619.5 units per square mile (239.2 units/km^{2}), of which 3.9% were vacant. The homeowner vacancy rate was 0.8% and the rental vacancy rate was 3.5%; 60.7% of occupied units were owner-occupied and 39.3% were renter-occupied. 96.4% of residents lived in urban areas and 3.6% lived in rural areas.

=== 2023 American Community Survey ===
The U.S. Census Bureau's 2019–2023 American Community Survey estimated that 24.3% of Fallbrook residents were foreign-born. Of those aged 5 or older, 57.4% spoke only English at home, 39.7% spoke Spanish, 1.1% spoke other Indo-European languages, 1.8% spoke Asian or Pacific Islander languages, and 0.1% spoke other languages. Among those aged 25 or older, 82.7% were high-school graduates and 27.3% held a bachelor's degree or higher. The median household income was $87,293 and the per capita income was $34,747; about 10.8% of families and 14.8% of all individuals were below the poverty line.

=== 2010 census ===
The 2010 United States census reported that Fallbrook had a population of 30,534, a population density of 1,738.7 inhabitants per square mile (671.3/km^{2}). The racial makeup was 67.0% White (49.1% non-Hispanic White), 1.6% African American, 0.8% Native American, 1.9% Asian, 0.2% Pacific Islander, 24.1% from other races, and 4.3% from two or more races; Hispanic or Latino residents of any race accounted for 45.2% of the population. The median age was 34.7 years.

== Government ==
Fallbrook is unincorporated, so it has no city council or mayor; municipal services are provided by San Diego County and by a network of independent special districts whose boards are elected by Fallbrook voters.

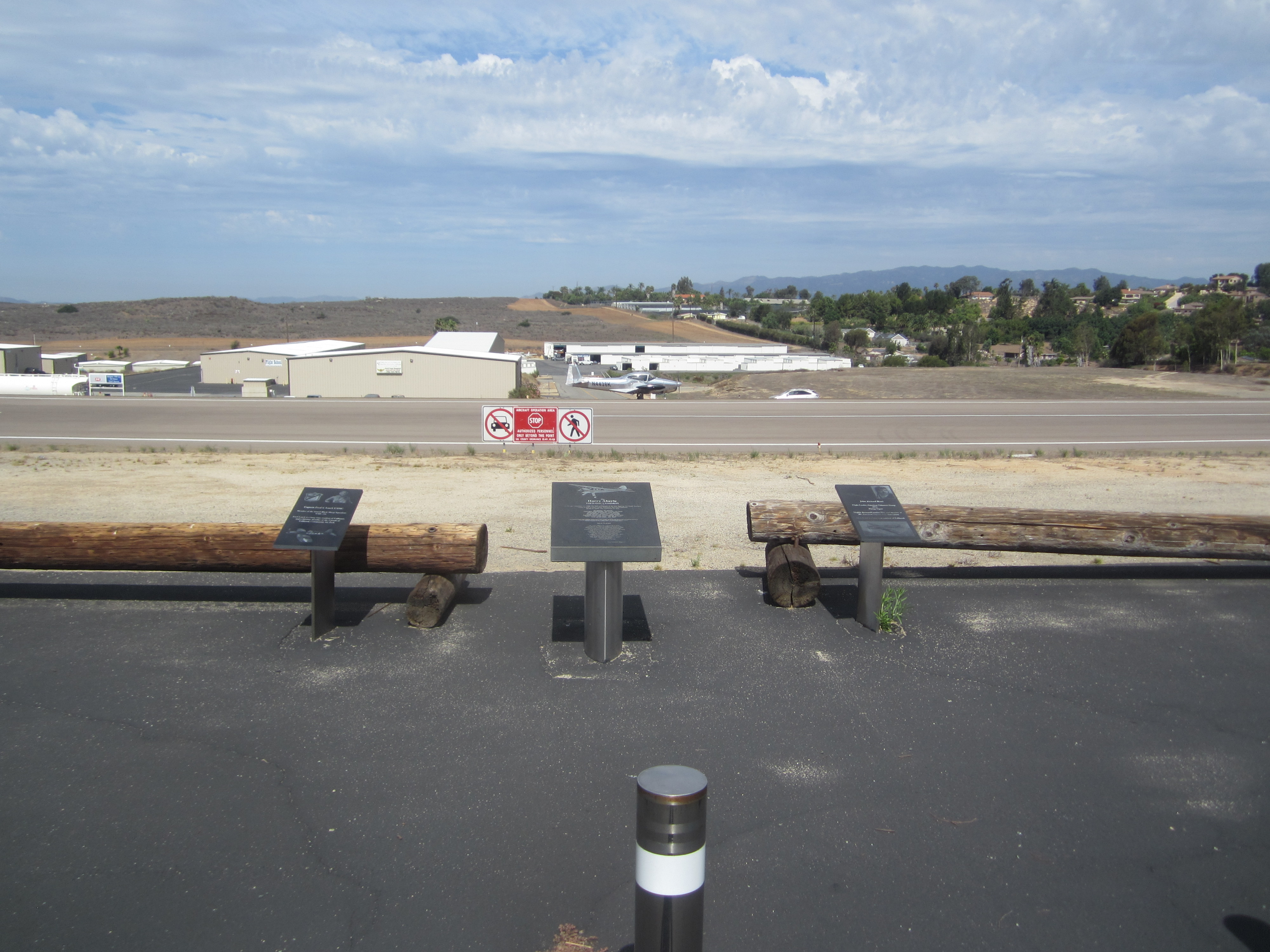
Fallbrook Airpark, owned by the County of San Diego

=== Federal ===
In the United States House of Representatives, the bulk of Fallbrook lies in California's 49th congressional district, represented by Democrat Mike Levin; the northeasternmost portion of the community is in California's 48th congressional district, represented by Republican Darrell Issa.

=== State ===
In the California State Senate, Fallbrook is in the 40th senatorial district, represented by Republican Brian Jones, represented by Republican Brian Jones, who has served as Senate Republican Leader since 2024.

In the California State Assembly, the majority of Fallbrook is in the 75th Assembly district, represented by Republican Carl DeMaio, represented by Republican Carl DeMaio, with a small portion in the 74th Assembly district, represented by Republican Laurie Davies, represented by Republican Laurie Davies.

=== County ===
As an unincorporated community, Fallbrook is governed at the county level by the San Diego County Board of Supervisors. It lies in Supervisor District 5, represented by Republican Jim Desmond.

=== Special districts ===
Five elected boards directly serve Fallbrook residents.

==== Fallbrook Regional Health District ====
The Fallbrook Regional Health District (FRHD), established in 1948 as the Fallbrook Hospital District, is governed by a five-member board of directors elected by zone to staggered four-year terms. As of April 2026, the directors are Jennifer Jeffries (Chair, Zone 1), Anabel Canseco (Secretary, Zone 2), Cindy Acosta (Zone 3), Sally DeVito (Vice Chair, Zone 4) and Howard Salmon (Treasurer, Zone 5). The District funds community-health grants and operates the Fallbrook Wellness Center on South Brandon Road.

==== North County Fire Protection District ====
The North County Fire Protection District (NCFPD) provides fire suppression and emergency medical services to Fallbrook, Rainbow, and adjacent unincorporated areas from five fire stations. Its five-member board of directors is elected by district to staggered four-year terms; the 2026 board is President Chris Shaw (District 2), Vice President Mike Reardon (District 5, appointed May 27, 2025), Director Ross Pike (District 1), Director Ken Munson (District 3), and Director Jeff Egkan (District 4).

==== Fallbrook Public Utility District ====
The Fallbrook Public Utility District (FPUD), formed in 1922, is the community's largest water and wastewater utility. Its five directors are elected by subdivision to overlapping four-year terms; as of 2026 the board comprises President Ken Endter (Subdivision 2), Vice President Dave Baxter (Subdivision 1), Jennifer DeMeo (Subdivision 3), Don McDougal (Subdivision 4), and Charley Wolk (Subdivision 5). The District was Frank Capra's employer of sorts in the 1950s and remains a party to litigation over Santa Margarita River water rights.

==== Rainbow Municipal Water District ====
Eastern portions of the Fallbrook planning area are served by the Rainbow Municipal Water District (RMWD), governed by five directors elected by division. The 2026 board is President Hayden Hamilton (Division 2), Vice President Michael Mack (Division 5), Lisa Hoffman (Division 1), Greg Irvine (Division 3), and Patti Townsend-Smith (Division 4).

==== Other districts ====
Fallbrook is also served by the elected boards of the Fallbrook Union Elementary School District, Fallbrook Union High School District, and Bonsall Unified School District (see Education below).

== Education ==
Public elementary and middle education in most of Fallbrook is provided by the Fallbrook Union Elementary School District (FUESD), which operates eight schools serving roughly 5,000 students. The five-member governing board is elected by trustee area to staggered four-year terms; the 2026 board comprises President Mary McBride (Area 5), Vice President Lief Hansen (Area 2), Clerk Ricardo Favela (Area 3), Frank Golbeck (Area 1), and Maria G. Moran (Area 4).

Secondary education is provided by the Fallbrook Union High School District (FUHSD), which operates Fallbrook Union High School, Ivy High School (continuation), and the Oasis Independent Study program. Its five-member board of trustees, also elected by trustee area, comprises President Oscar Caralampio (Area 4), Vice President Eddie Jones (Area 5), Clerk Tauna Rodarte (Area 1), Paul Christensen (Area 3), and Chris Haskell (Area 2).

The southeastern part of the Fallbrook planning area falls within the unified Bonsall Unified School District, which serves both elementary and secondary students at four campuses in Bonsall and the Gird Valley. Bonsall USD is also governed by a five-member elected board; the 2026 board is President Larissa Anderson, Clerk Michael Gaddis, and members Roger Merchat, Eric Ortega, and Rachael Dombrowski, plus a non-voting student member, Ayla Nicknom.

Higher education in the area is provided by Palomar College, a public community college based in San Marcos whose service area includes Fallbrook.

== Media ==
=== Filming location ===
Portions of the 1928 film The Mating Call, directed by James Cruze and produced by Howard Hughes, were filmed in Fallbrook. The "haunted house" featured in the 2007 film Sarah Landon and the Paranormal Hour is in Fallbrook. A Fallbrook apartment building served as a filming location in the 2015 film Thane of East County. Frank Capra's 1952 short documentary The Fallbrook Story, made for the local Chamber of Commerce, dramatizes the Fallbrook Public Utility District's water-rights dispute with the federal government.

== Notable people ==
Fallbrook has long attracted artists and entertainers; a number of figures with national reputations have made the community their primary or secondary home.

- James Callahan (1930–2007), actor known for Charles in Charge; died at his home in Fallbrook.
- Kayla Canett (born 1998), rugby union player and 2024 Olympic bronze medalist; attended Fallbrook High School.
- Frank Capra (1897–1991), film director; owner of the Red Mountain Ranch, Fallbrook Olive Oil producer, and former FPUD director.
- Richard Carpenter (born 1946), of The Carpenters.
- Dolores Costello (1903–1979), silent-film actress; lived on a 40-acre De Luz Road avocado ranch from 1940 and died at Fallbrook Hospital.
- Rita Coolidge (born 1945), singer.
- Michael Curtis, television writer and producer (Friends, Jonas).
- Edward Faulkner (1932–2025), character actor in John Wayne films; relocated to Fallbrook in 2014.
- Rick Founds, Christian songwriter, best known for "Lord, I Lift Your Name on High"; based in Fallbrook.
- Rudolph Hass (1892–1952), developer of the Hass avocado.
- Tony Hawk (born 1968), professional skateboarder; former Fallbrook resident.
- Leo Howard (born 1997), actor and martial artist (Kickin' It, G.I. Joe: The Rise of Cobra); raised in Fallbrook.
- Howard Keel (1919–2004), singer and actor; alumnus of Fallbrook Union High School.
- Aimee La Joie, actress; began her acting career while attending Fallbrook High School.
- Tom Metzger (1938–2020), white supremacist and former Ku Klux Klan leader; longtime Fallbrook resident.
- Martin Milner (1931–2015), actor (Adam-12, Route 66); former Fallbrook resident.
- Jason Mraz (born 1977), musician.
- Dave Mustaine (born 1961), musician; secondary residence.
- T. Jefferson Parker (born 1953), three-time Edgar Award-winning crime novelist; longtime Fallbrook resident.
- Shane Peterson (born 1988), former Major League Baseball outfielder (Oakland Athletics, Milwaukee Brewers, Tampa Bay Rays); born in Fallbrook.
- Christie Repasy (born 1958), floral artist; hosts the seasonal "Chateau de Fleurs" market at her Fallbrook home.
- Mark Rogowski (born 1966), former professional skateboarder; Fallbrook-area resident before his 1991 arrest.
- Duke Snider (1926–2011), Baseball Hall of Fame outfielder; Fallbrook avocado rancher for over 50 years.
- Elise Trouw (born 1999), singer, multi-instrumentalist and producer; former Fallbrook-area resident.

== See also ==
- List of census-designated places in California
