= Vista, California =

City in California, United States

- City
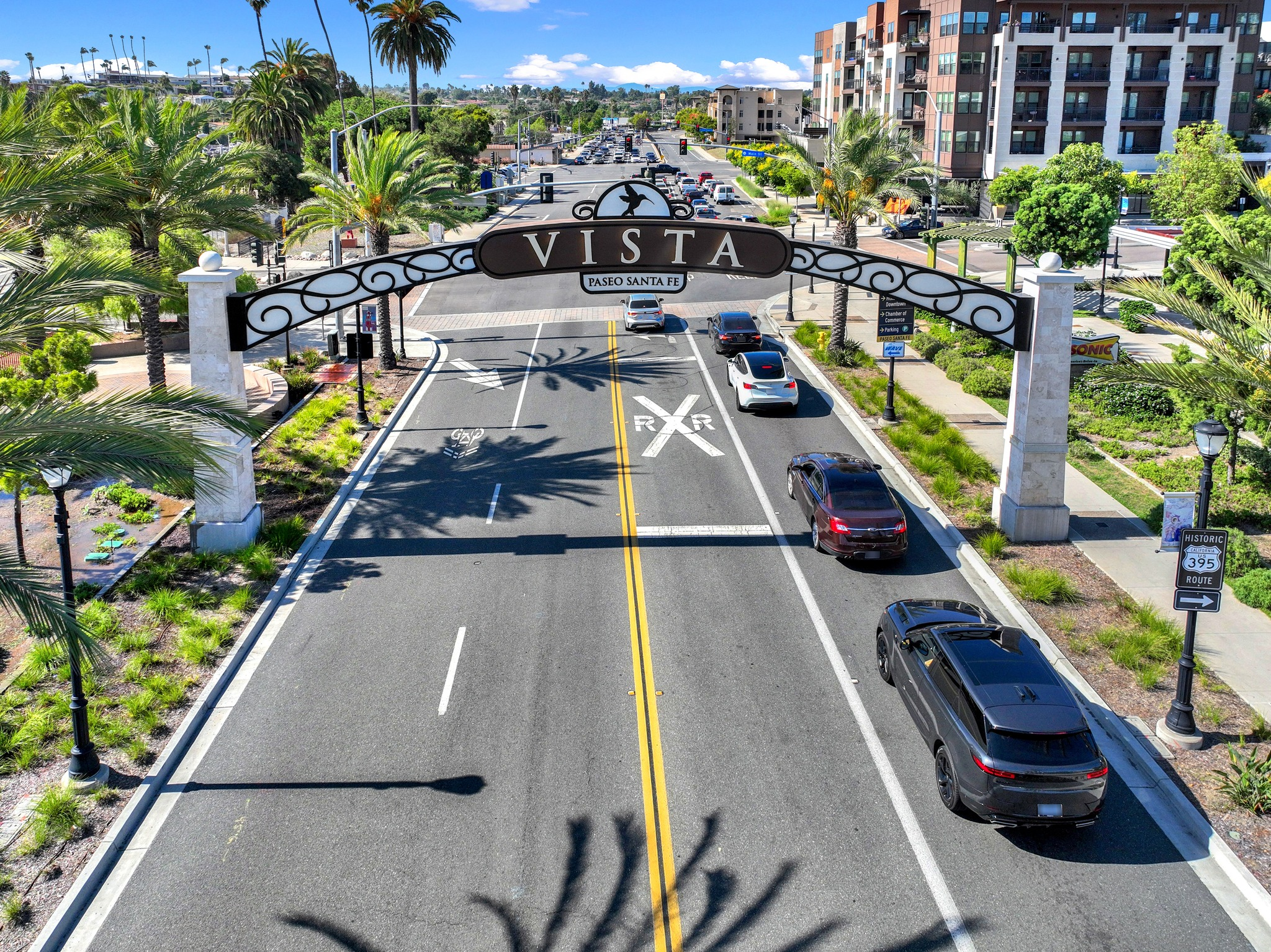
- Vista Gateway Arch at S Santa Fe Ave and Main St near downtown

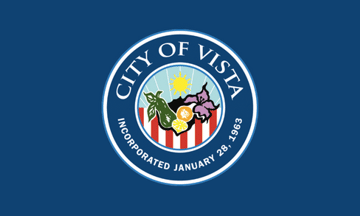
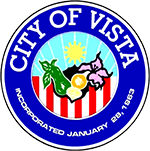
- Flag Seal
- Motto: America's Climatic Wonderland
- Interactive map of Vista, California
- Location in the United States
- Coordinates: 33°11′37″N 117°14′28″W
- Country: United States
- State: California
- County: San Diego
- Incorporated: January 28, 1963

Government
  - Type: Council-Manager
  - Mayor: John Franklin
  - City council: Daniel O'Donnell, Deputy Mayor; Jeff Fox; Corinna Contreras; Katie Melendez
  - City Manager: John Conley

Area
  - Total: 18.75 sq mi (48.56 km^{2})
  - Land: 18.75 sq mi (48.56 km^{2})
  - Water: 0 sq mi (0.00 km^{2}) 0%
- Elevation: 325 ft (99 m)

Population (2020)
  - Total: 98,381
  - Rank: 77th in California; 307th in the United States
  - Density: 5,247/sq mi (2,026/km^{2})
- Demonym: Vistan
- Time zone: UTC−8 (Pacific Time Zone)
  - Summer (DST): UTC−7 (PDT)
- ZIP codes: 92081, 92083–92085
- Area codes: 442/760
- FIPS code: 06-82996
- GNIS feature IDs: 1661645, 2412161
- Flower: California Lilac
- Bird: Anna's hummingbird
- Tree: Kentia Palm
- Website: www.vista.gov

Vista (/ˈvɪstə/; Spanish for "view") is a city in San Diego County, California, United States. It is a medium-sized city within the San Diego-Carlsbad metropolitan statistical area. As of the 2020 census, Vista had a population of 98,381. Current data estimates a 2023 population of 99,835.

Vista's sphere of influence also includes portions of unincorporated San Diego County to the north and east, with a county island in the central west. Located just 7 mi (11 km) inland from the Pacific Ocean, it has a Mediterranean climate.

Much of Vista's current territory was once part of the Mexican land grants of Rancho Buena Vista and Rancho Guajome. A post office was established on October 9, 1882, and Vista was incorporated as a city on January 28, 1963, later becoming a charter city on June 13, 2007.

== History ==
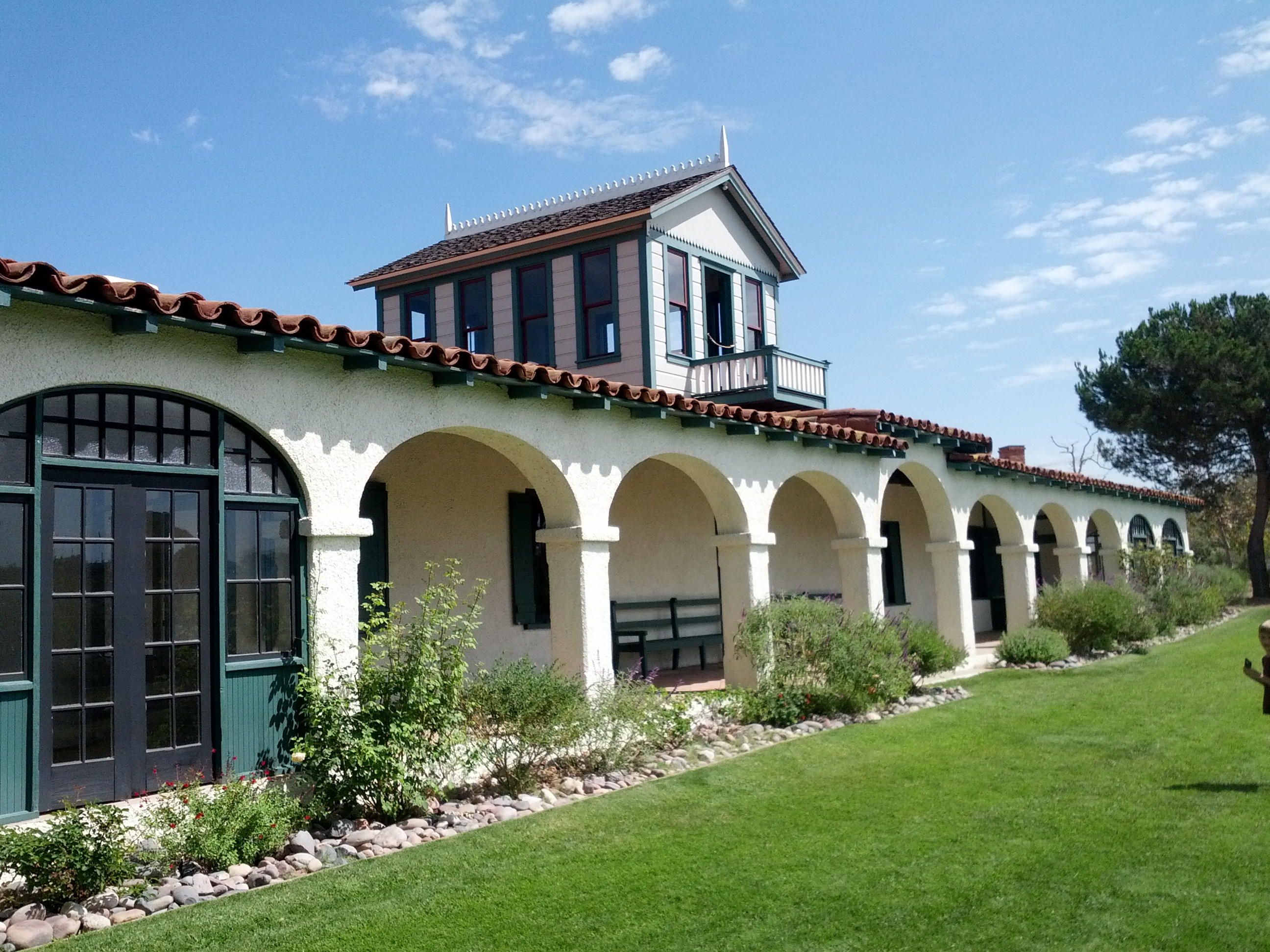
The Rancho Guajome Adobe is the second oldest building in Vista.

The Vista area was originally inhabited by the Luiseño people, who established a village called Tovalum.

Spain controlled the land from the late 18th century to the early 19th century and established various missions. Spanish presence declined by the 1830s with the independence of Mexico from Spain. The Mexican government began to grant ranchos to a variety of people. Three of these were granted in Vista as Rancho Guajome, Rancho Buena Vista, and Agua Hedionda Y los Manos.

In the 1850s the ranchos began to fade due to changing political conditions and the scarcity of water. A growing number of settlers came to the area after California became a state in 1850 and began to create smaller agricultural holdings. One settler in the Vista area, John A. Frazier, applied to open the first post office and after several attempts to name the city (Frazier and Buena Vista were already taken), Frazier finally chose the name "Vista"; the post office was opened in 1882.

In 1870, Bernard Delpy arrived from France to build what eventually became known as "Delpy Corners" at the intersection of today's East Vista Way and Foothill Drive. His nephew, Jules Jacques Delpy, joined him in 1879 and together they planted several hundred acres of grapes. In 1886, they built the first successful winery in the country. The winery was shut down by the Prohibition era.

Inhibited by the lack of water, Vista grew slowly through the early 1910s to less than 1,000 people. With a 1923, however, the Vista Irrigation District had the necessary funding to construct a new water supply from Lake Henshaw. Agriculture began to flourish in the area, including citrus fruits, tomatoes, celery, and most prominently avocados. Vista became home to multiple avocado packing facilities, and by the late 1940s was promoted as "the avocado capital of the world" The rise in agriculture led in turn to further commercial development.

Following World War II, agriculture declined with an influx of population and housing. The City of Vista was incorporated on January 28, 1963. The frequent housing booms of the 1970s through early 2000s greatly increased the population of Vista, and the city limits have grown as well. Many light manufacturing businesses moved into Vista beginning in the 1980s, and with the founding of several breweries in the 21st century Vista has become a significant element in the San Diego craft beer industry.

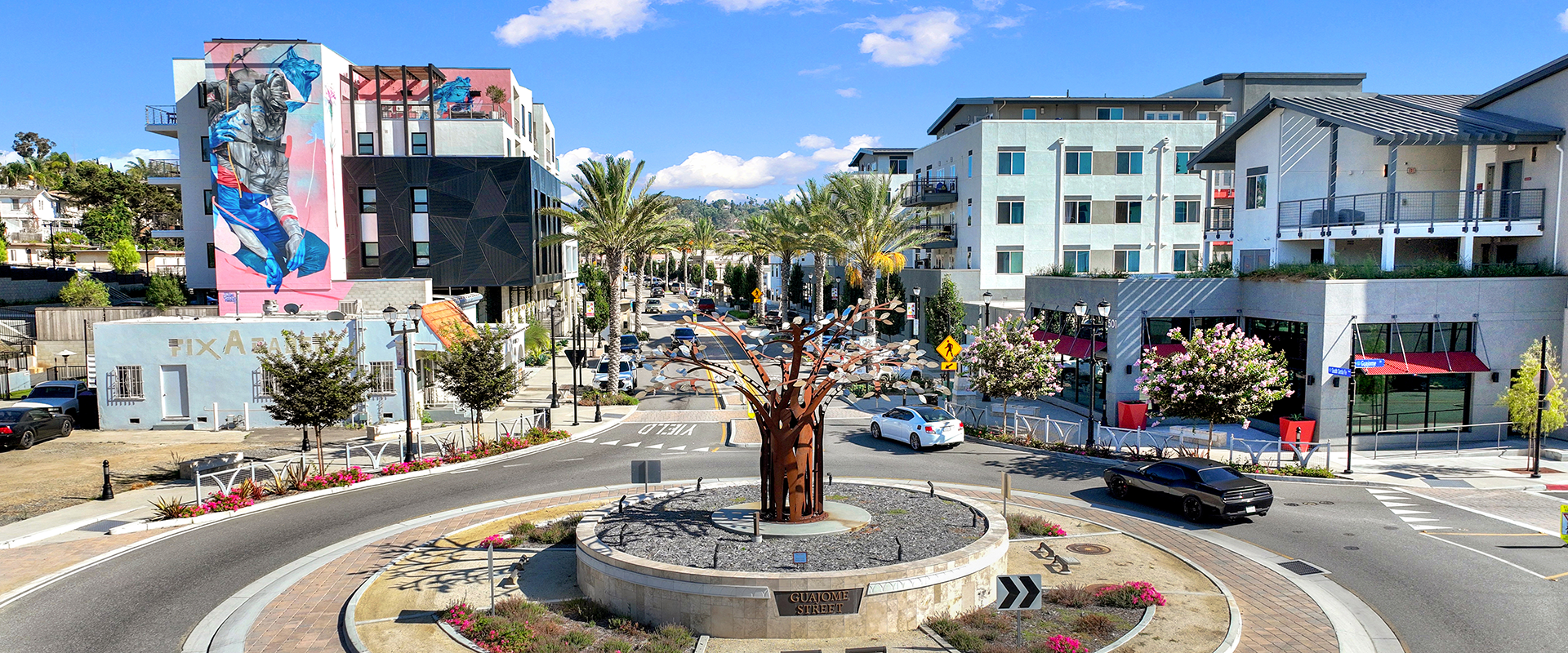
Paseo Santa Fe in Downtown Vista

Since the 1990s, the downtown area has received about $12 million in investments from Vista for improvements. The City of Vista released a plan in 2015 for the further development of downtown, aiming to make it the main commercial, social, and cultural hub in Vista. In 2020, Vista finished the Paseo Santa Fe corridor project, which transformed almost a mile of Santa Fe Avenue into a pedestrian-friendly street with a number of restaurants and housing complexes.

== Geography ==
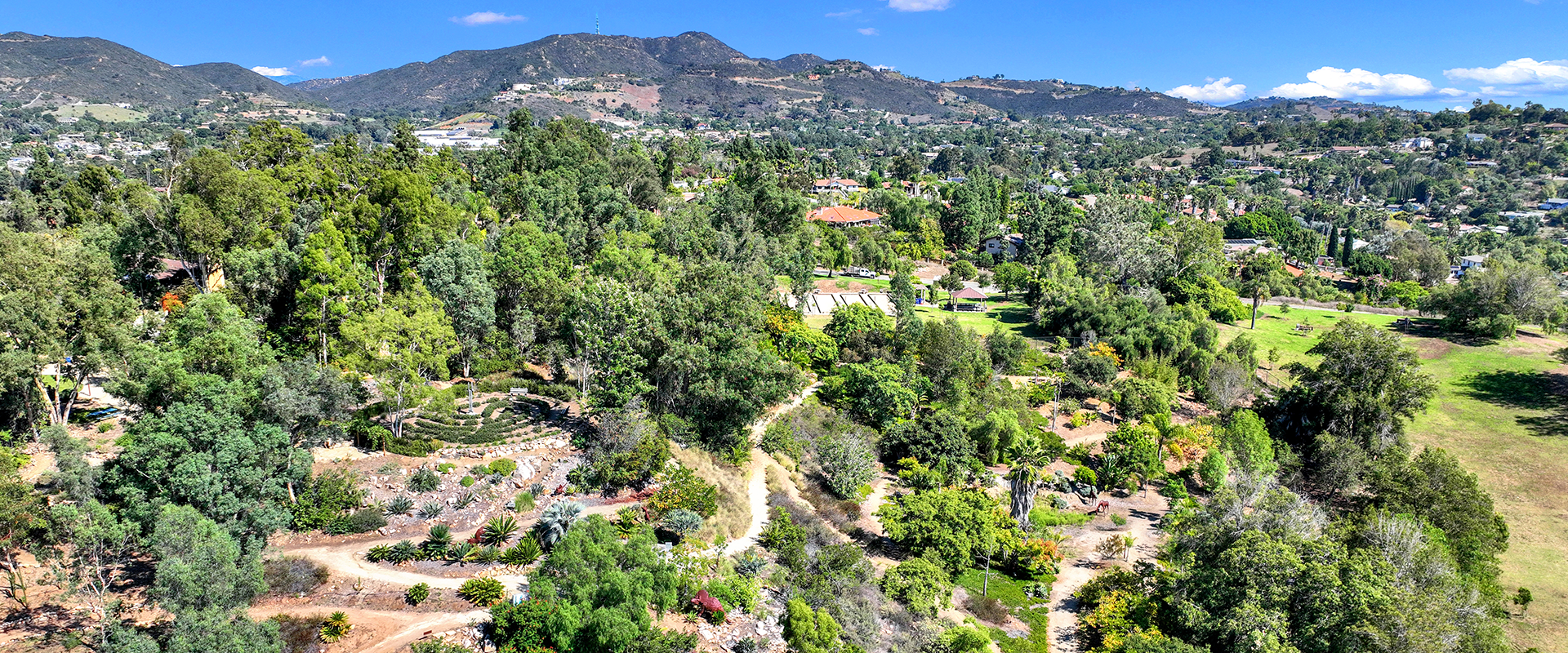
Landscape view showing Vista's hilly terrain

According to the United States Census Bureau, the city has a total area of 18.7 square miles (48 km^{2}) of land. Like much of the California coastal area, the landscape is marked by hills and valleys. In undeveloped areas, the natural vegetation types includes chaparral brushland, oak-sycamore woodland, riparian (stream) woodland, and oak-grass savanna.

=== Climate ===
Vista has a semi-arid climate (Köppen: BSk) bordering on a Mediterranean climate (Csa). Extremes of temperature are uncommon. Frost is quite rare in winter, and snowfall is almost unknown; the last significant snowfall in Vista was in 1967. Most of the annual rainfall of 13.24 inches (336 mm) falls between November and April. The mild weather led to the city's promotional motto "America's Climatic Wonderland", which was in use for many years.

Climate data for Vista, California (1991–2020 normals, extremes 1957–present)
Month	Jan	Feb	Mar	Apr	May	Jun	Jul	Aug	Sep	Oct	Nov	Dec	Year
Record high °F (°C)	94 (34)	93 (34)	96 (36)	101 (38)	101 (38)	108 (42)	107 (42)	106 (41)	107 (42)	107 (42)	97 (36)	90 (32)	108 (42)
Mean maximum °F (°C)	82.4 (28.0)	81.5 (27.5)	82.9 (28.3)	87.2 (30.7)	86.2 (30.1)	87.6 (30.9)	91.1 (32.8)	93.5 (34.2)	98.1 (36.7)	94.1 (34.5)	88.5 (31.4)	80.3 (26.8)	101.2 (38.4)
Mean daily maximum °F (°C)	65.6 (18.7)	65.4 (18.6)	66.7 (19.3)	69.4 (20.8)	71.0 (21.7)	74.5 (23.6)	78.9 (26.1)	80.7 (27.1)	80.5 (26.9)	76.0 (24.4)	71.1 (21.7)	64.8 (18.2)	72.0 (22.2)
Daily mean °F (°C)	55.7 (13.2)	55.6 (13.1)	57.5 (14.2)	59.9 (15.5)	63.1 (17.3)	66.5 (19.2)	70.5 (21.4)	71.9 (22.2)	70.8 (21.6)	66.1 (18.9)	60.4 (15.8)	54.9 (12.7)	62.7 (17.1)
Mean daily minimum °F (°C)	45.7 (7.6)	45.8 (7.7)	48.3 (9.1)	50.4 (10.2)	55.2 (12.9)	58.5 (14.7)	62.2 (16.8)	63.2 (17.3)	61.2 (16.2)	56.2 (13.4)	49.7 (9.8)	45.0 (7.2)	53.5 (11.9)
Mean minimum °F (°C)	35.6 (2.0)	36.4 (2.4)	38.5 (3.6)	41.6 (5.3)	46.3 (7.9)	52.1 (11.2)	55.6 (13.1)	56.0 (13.3)	52.8 (11.6)	47.9 (8.8)	40.7 (4.8)	35.4 (1.9)	32.7 (0.4)
Record low °F (°C)	21 (−6)	29 (−2)	25 (−4)	31 (−1)	32 (0)	42 (6)	44 (7)	41 (5)	39 (4)	36 (2)	33 (1)	23 (−5)	21 (−6)
Average precipitation inches (mm)	2.85 (72)	3.12 (79)	2.11 (54)	0.96 (24)	0.35 (8.9)	0.09 (2.3)	0.10 (2.5)	0.03 (0.76)	0.16 (4.1)	0.59 (15)	1.09 (28)	1.94 (49)	13.39 (340)
Average precipitation days (≥ 0.01 in)	7.0	7.9	6.0	4.1	3.1	1.0	0.8	0.4	0.7	2.1	4.3	6.2	43.6
Source: NOAA

== Demographics ==
Historical population
Census	Pop.	Note	%±
1950	1,705		—
1960	14,795		767.7%
1970	24,688		66.9%
1980	35,834		45.1%
1990	71,872		100.6%
2000	89,857		25.0%
2010	93,834		4.4%
2020	98,381		4.8%
U.S. Decennial Census; 1860–1870 1880-1890; 1900 1910 1920; 1930 1940 1950; 1960 1970 1980; 1990 2000 2010; 2020

=== Racial and ethnic composition ===
Vista city, California – Racial and ethnic composition Note: the US Census treats Hispanic/Latino as an ethnic category. This table excludes Latinos from the racial categories and assigns them to a separate category. Hispanics/Latinos may be of any race.
Race / Ethnicity (NH = Non-Hispanic)	Pop 2000	Pop 2010	Pop 2020	% 2000	% 2010	% 2020
White alone (NH)	44,844	38,287	35,518	49.91%	40.80%	36.10%
Black or African American alone (NH)	3,535	2,753	2,410	3.93%	2.93%	2.45%
Native American or Alaska Native alone (NH)	440	336	273	0.49%	0.36%	0.28%
Asian alone (NH)	3,206	3,806	4,984	3.57%	4.06%	5.07%
Native Hawaiian or Pacific Islander alone (NH)	526	615	612	0.59%	0.66%	0.62%
Other race alone (NH)	161	175	523	0.18%	0.19%	0.53%
Mixed race or Multiracial (NH)	2,155	2,482	4,317	2.40%	2.65%	4.39%
Hispanic or Latino (any race)	34,990	45,380	49,744	38.94%	48.36%	50.56%
Total	89,857	93,834	98,381	100.00%	100.00%	100.00%

=== 2020 census ===
As of the 2020 census, Vista had a population of 98,381. The median age was 35.0 years. Males comprised 50.1% of the population and females comprised 49.9%. 23.3% of residents were under the age of 18 and 12.5% of residents were 65 years of age or older. For every 100 females there were 100.3 males, and for every 100 females age 18 and over there were 98.4 males age 18 and over.

Whites and Hispanics were the most numerous race and ethnic groups in the city, and 7.8% of residents identified as Hispanic and White alone.

100.0% of residents lived in urban areas, while 0.0% lived in rural areas.

There were 31,663 households in Vista, of which 37.6% had children under the age of 18 living in them. Of all households, 49.5% were married-couple households, 17.0% were households with a male householder and no spouse or partner present, and 24.9% were households with a female householder and no spouse or partner present. About 18.7% of all households were made up of individuals and 7.0% had someone living alone who was 65 years of age or older.

There were 32,815 housing units, of which 3.5% were vacant. The homeowner vacancy rate was 1.1% and the rental vacancy rate was 3.8%.

=== 2022 American Community Survey ===
The 2022 American Community Survey 1-Year Estimates reported that within Vista city, whites and Hispanics were the most numerous race/ethnic groups. The top ancestries were German, English, and Irish. All other specified races individually made up less than 10% of the population. Within the population under 18, whites made up a larger fraction at 83.8%. Among households having children, the average number of children was two. The overall median age was 34.4 years.

The median household income was $94,975. Approximately 10.5% of the population was below the poverty line, an improvement over both the national and California state averages. The poverty rate was highest among single parent households with young children (greater than 20%), and lowest among married couple households with young children (less than 5%). The majority of households were married couple families, and the majority of homes were single-family detached houses. More residents owned their homes than rented.

== Economy ==
=== Top employers ===
According to the city's FY 2022-2023 Comprehensive Annual Financial Report, the top employers in the city are:

#	Employer	# of Employees
1	Vista Unified School District	2,865
2	Cue Health Inc	1,515
3	Watkins Manufacturing Corp	810
4	Pirch, Inc.	420
5	Fresh Creative Foods	363
6	Costco Wholesale	356
7	Walmart Stores	326
8	Dr. Bronner's Magic Soaps	321
9	City of Vista	296
10	Frazier Farms	288

== Sports ==
Vista high schools have fielded several CIF Champion teams in recent years: the Mission Vista Timberwolves in both basketball and soccer, and the Vista Panthers in football.

== Parks and recreation ==
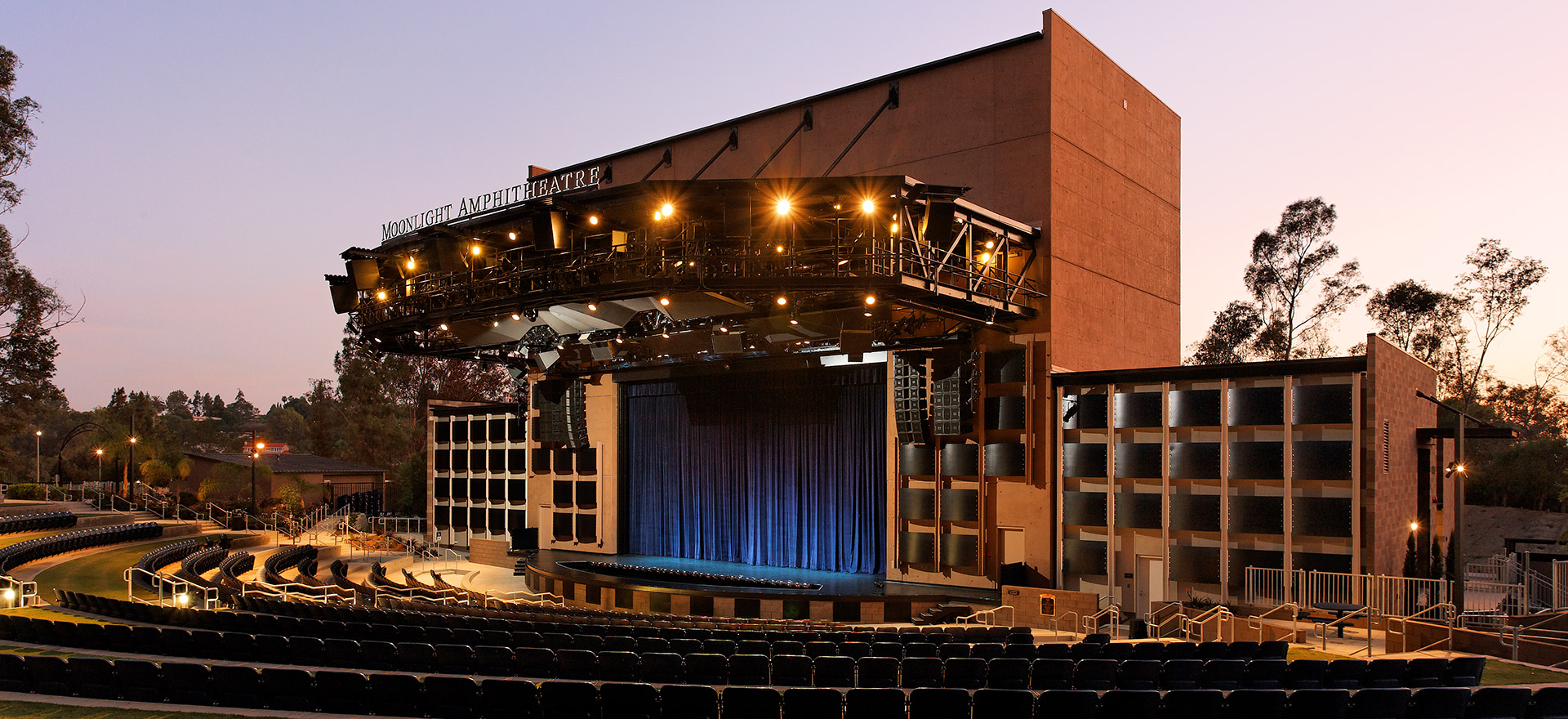
The stage at Moonlight Amphitheatre

Vista is home to two city-owned theaters: the Moonlight Amphitheatre and the Avo Playhouse. The Moonlight Amphitheatre, located in Brengle Terrace Park, is an open-air theater that specializes in musical productions, performing several musicals during the course of the summer. During the winter, the stage is used as a concert venue called ClubM which hosts both performers and audience members alike on the stage itself. Moonlight Productions performs plays in winter months at the Avo Playhouse, a former movie theater now owned by the city.

Several popular downtown events include the North County St. Patrick's Day Parade & Festival, the Vista Strawberry Festival, the Vista Rod Run and the annual Winterfest & Christmas Parade.

Two of the best-known parks in the city are Brengle Terrace Park and Guajome County Park. Brengle Terrace Park houses the Moonlight Amphitheatre, Alta Vista Gardens (a city-owned botanical garden), two softball fields, a senior center, a playground, and the city community center, where the main offices of the city's day camps are held. Guajome County Park has 557 acres (2.25 km^{2}) of land, which is shared between Vista and nearby Oceanside. It features a small lake, willow and oak woodlands, campsites, horse trails, and Rancho Guajome Adobe, a National Historic Landmark.

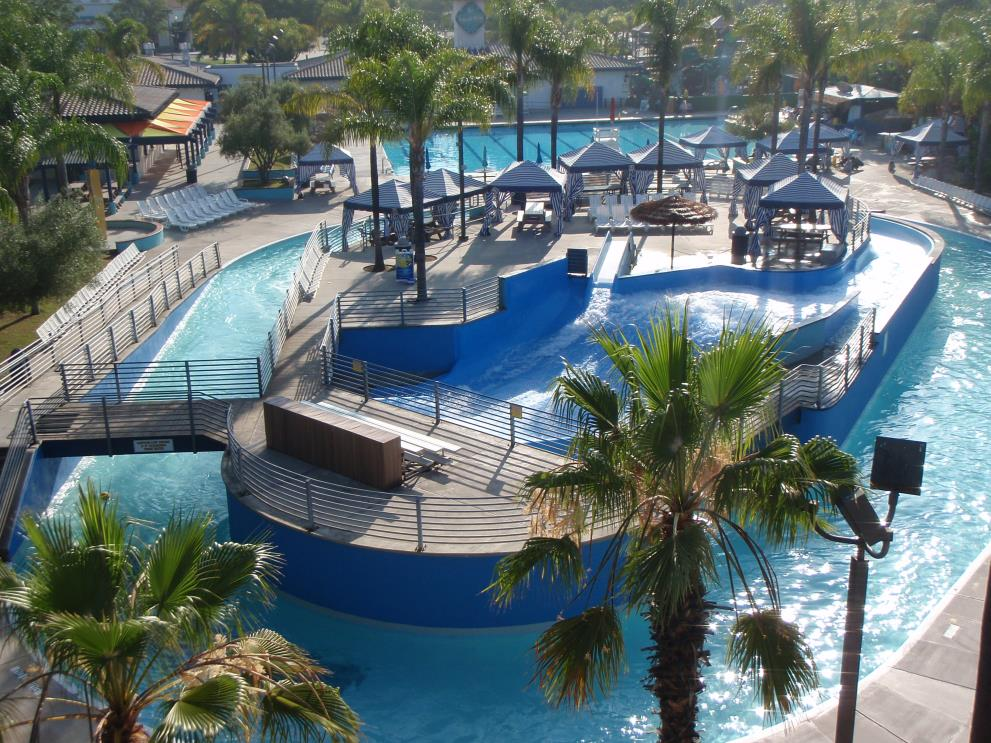
The Wave Waterpark facilities

The Rancho Guajome Adobe and Rancho Buena Vista Adobe are two historic rancho buildings in Vista, built in the mid-nineteenth century, both available for tours and special occasions. Rancho Buena Vista Adobe is owned and operated by the city government, while Rancho Guajome Adobe (and Guajome Park itself) are owned by the county. Adjacent to Guajome Park is the Antique Gas and Steam Engine Museum, an open-air museum demonstrating agricultural equipment from the 19th and early 20th centuries.

Other recreation facilities include the city-run Wave Waterpark, a sports park, and a Boomers location.

== Government ==
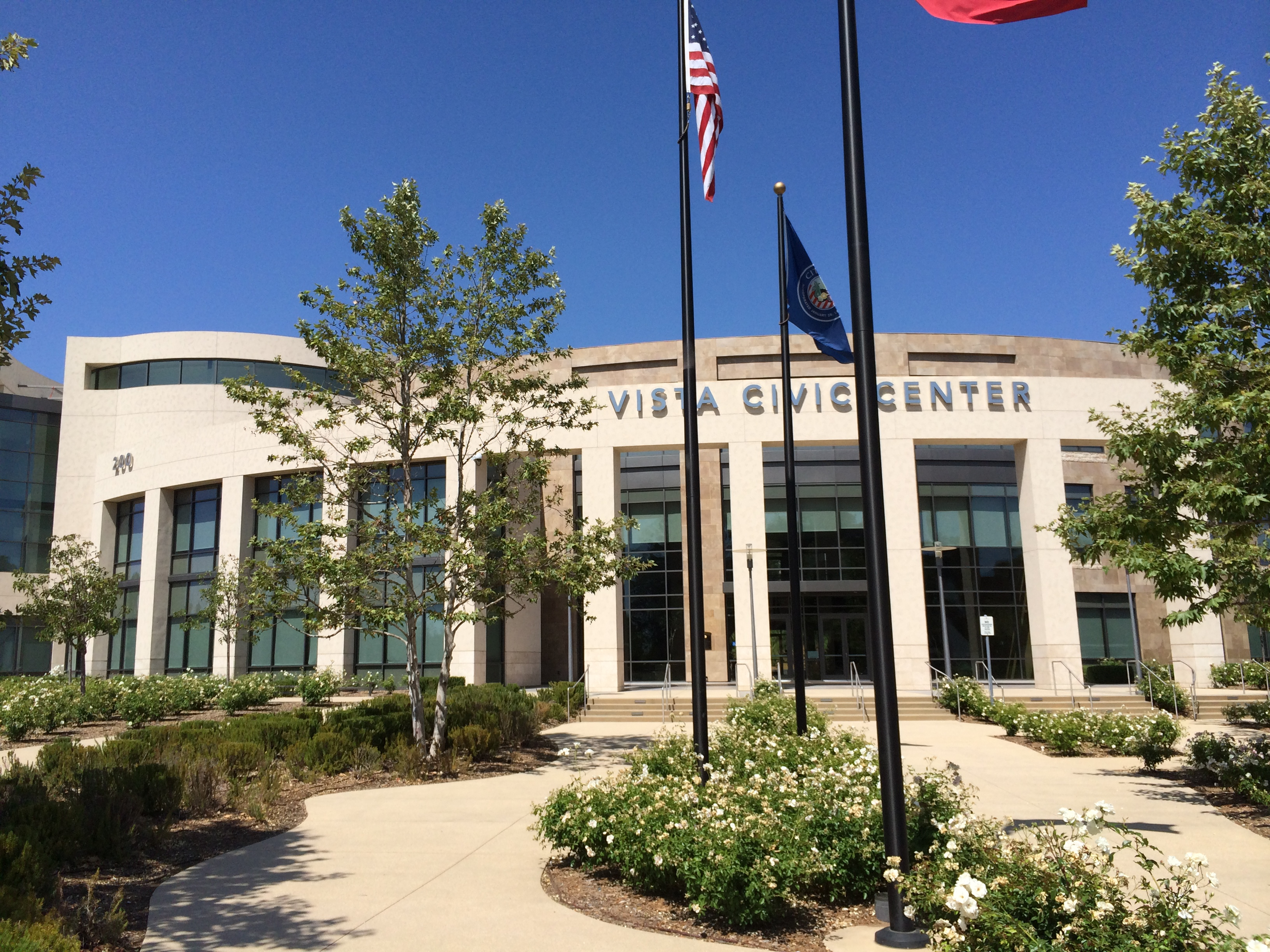
Vista Civic Center

=== City government ===
Vista, a charter city since 2007, operates under the council-manager form of government, with a weak-mayor system. The city is governed by a mayor, John B. Franklin, and a city council, consisting of Katie Melendez, Corinna Contreras, Jeff Fox, and Daniel O'Donnell. Since 2017, the four city councilmembers have been elected by districts; the mayor has always been elected at large.

=== State and federal representation ===
In the California State Legislature, Vista is in the 38th senatorial district, represented by Democrat Catherine Blakespear, and in the 74th Assembly district, represented by Republican Laurie Davies.

In the United States House of Representatives, Vista is in California's 49th congressional district, which has a Cook PVI of D+4 and is represented by Democrat Mike Levin.

According to the San Diego County Registrar of Voters, in February 2024 the City of Vista had more registered Democrats than Republicans. Out of a total of 51,696 registered voters, 20,446 were Democrats (39.6% of voters), 14,512 were Republicans (28.1%), 2,454 were American Independent Party registrants (4.7%), 818 were Libertarians (1.6%), 390 were Peace and Freedom Party registrants (0.8%), and 284 were Greens (0.5%). A further 623 were registered with miscellaneous non–ballot-qualified parties (1.2%), and 12,169 were registered no party preference (23.5%).

== Education ==
Vista Unified School District serves Vista and parts of Oceanside and several unincorporated communities, with seventeen elementary schools, six middle schools, and six high schools, including Rancho Buena Vista High School, Vista High School and Mission Vista High School. Guajome Park Academy is a charter school with joint elementary, middle, and high schools that receives part of its funding from the Vista Unified School District.

Vista is home to six International Baccalaureate schools (IB): Casita Center, Vista Academy of Visual and Performing Arts, Vista Magnet Middle, Rancho Buena Vista HS, Guajome Park Academy HS, and Vista High School.

There are 12 private schools with over 2,500 students, including Tri-City Christian School, St. Francis of Assisi Catholic School, and Calvary Christian School. The Vista Unified School District also runs the Vista Adult School.

== Media ==
=== News ===
The Vista Press was a weekly newspaper published in Vista from 1926 through the early 21st century. After it folded, the name was revived for an unrelated online news site. Vista also receives local coverage in the weekly Coast News and the daily San Diego Union-Tribune.

=== Broadcast media ===
Vista is part of the San Diego–Tijuana media market. Operating out of the city are KCEO on AM 1000, which is an affiliate of the Catholic Relevant Radio network, and KHAX-LD, a translator of the local Univision television station KBNT-CD.

== Infrastructure ==
=== Transportation ===
Mass transit in Vista is provided by the North County Transit District (NCTD), which operates several bus routes to and within the city. The Vista Transit Center serves as the hub and provides connections between the Oceanside Transit Center and Escondido Transit Center.

The Sprinter hybrid rail line makes three stops in Vista, including at the transit center.

=== Major roads and highways ===
- State Route 78
- Vista Village Drive/Vista Way
- Santa Fe Avenue
- Bobier Drive
- Civic Center Drive
- Melrose Drive
- Sycamore Avenue
- Shadowridge Drive
- Emerald Drive

=== Utilities ===
In the city of Vista, gas and electric service is provided by San Diego Gas & Electric, while water is provided by the Vista Irrigation District. Sewerage is provided by the City of Vista.

=== Healthcare ===
The city of Vista is located within the Tri-City Hospital District, which provides emergency care and hospitalization, while ambulance service is provided by the Vista Fire Department. The Vista Community Clinic provides general health care to those who face economic, social or cultural barriers.

=== Government facilities ===
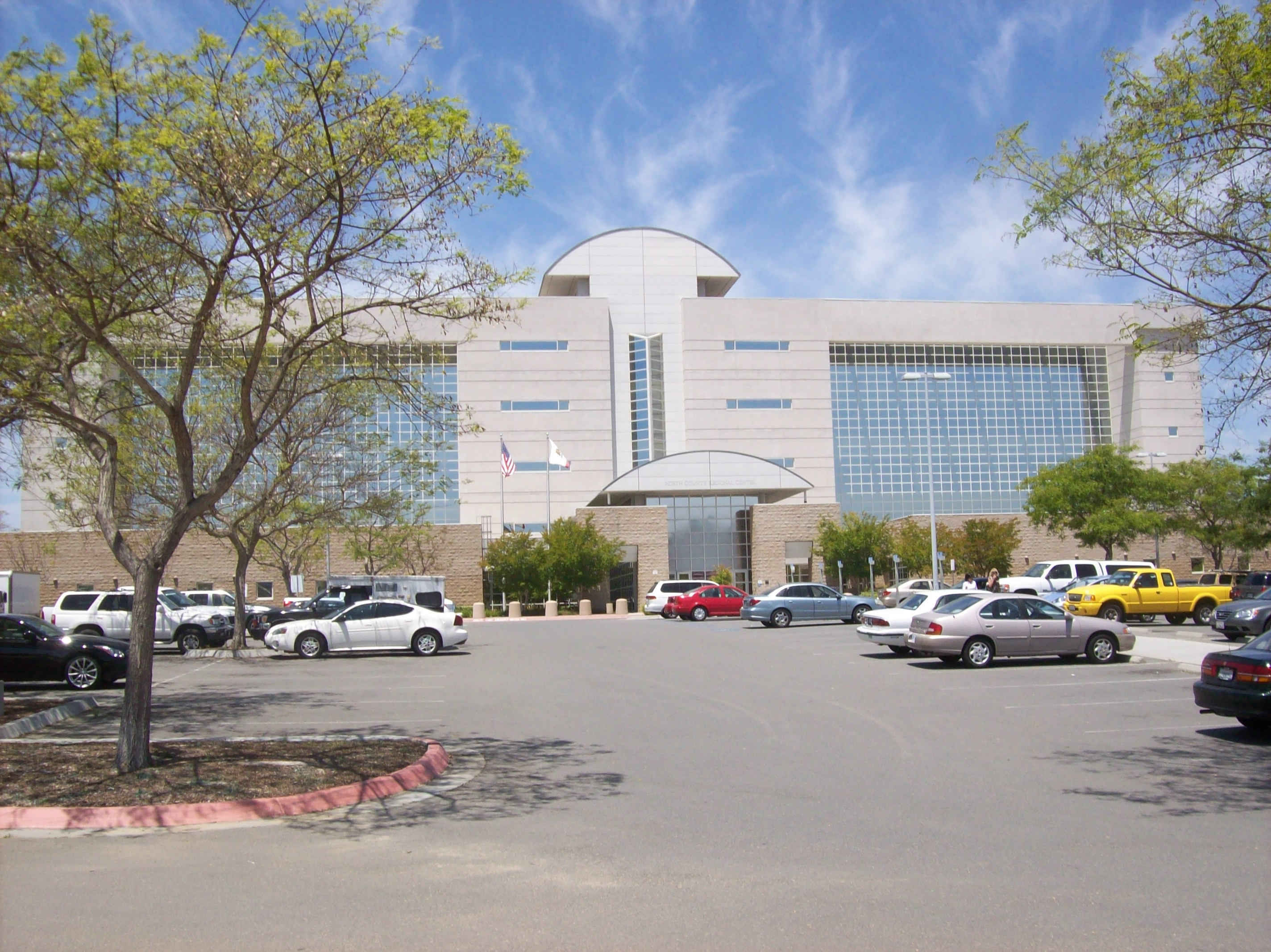
North County Regional Center

Located in Vista is the North County Regional Center, a San Diego County facility shared by the Superior Court, Sheriff, Vista Detention Facility jail, Probation, District Attorney, Revenue and Recovery, and the County Board of Supervisors. The North County Superior Court is a full service branch court.

=== Public safety ===
Law enforcement is provided by the San Diego County Sheriff's Office through a contract with the City of Vista, approved by the City Council. Fire suppression, fire prevention and EMS is provided by the Vista Fire Department.

== Notable people ==
- Bob Burnquist, Brazilian-American skater
- Michael Damian, actor known for The Young & The Restless
- Rudolph B. Davila, World War II Medal of Honor recipient
- Lorena Gonzalez Fletcher, organized labor leader and former California State Assemblywoman
- Leon Hall, defensive back for NFL's Oakland Raiders
- William Harmatz, professional thoroughbred jockey
- Allan Holdsworth, British guitarist and composer.
- Darrell Issa, U.S. representative for California's 48th congressional district
- Red Killefer, professional baseball player
- Korey Lee, professional baseball catcher
- Katherine "Scottie" MacGregor, actress, most notably in television series Little House on the Prairie
- Carrie Prejean, Miss California 2009
- Don Prudhomme, retired drag racer and businessman
- Cove Reber, singer-songwriter; lead vocalist of Saosin from 2004 to 2010 and Dead American
- Dave Roberts, manager of the Los Angeles Dodgers; former Major League outfielder
- Alan S. Thompson, retired U.S. Navy Vice Admiral and former director of the Defense Logistics Agency
- Pisa Tinoisamoa, retired NFL linebacker
- Sara Watkins, singer-songwriter and fiddler
- Sean Watkins, singer-songwriter and guitarist, best known for being in the band Nickel Creek, the duo Fiction Family and the supergroup Works Progress Administration
- Danny Way, skateboarder
- Tony Wolters, catcher for the Colorado Rockies,
- Kirby Wright, poet and writer
- Heather Youmans, singer, actress, and contestant on American Idol
