= San Luis Rey River bike path =

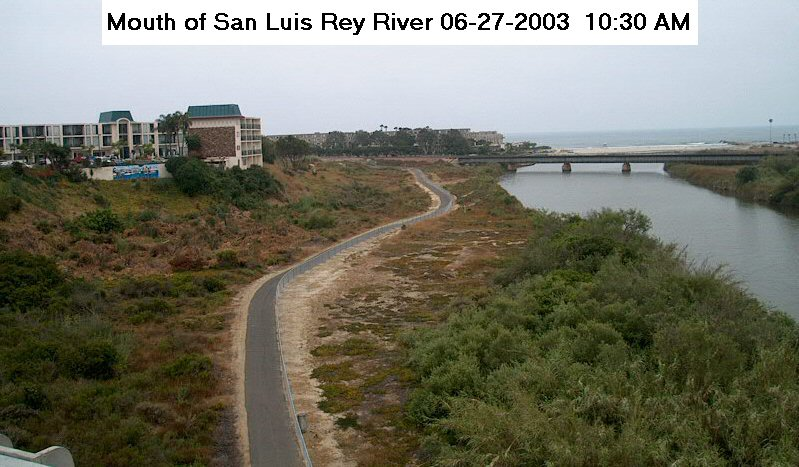
- Length: 9 mi (14 km)
- Location: Oceanside, California
- Trailheads: Eastern 33.2464°N 117.2818°W; Western 33.2000°N 117.3855°W
- Difficulty: Easy
- Season: All seasons
- Surface: Asphalt

The San Luis Rey River bike path is a bike path for bicycle and pedestrian use that follows the San Luis Rey River in Oceanside in northern San Diego County, California.

This 9 miles (14 km) paved class one bike route is an easy and relatively flat and straight ride. Its entire length is separated from all vehicular transportation, except for one mile from the easternmost access point where North Santa Fe Avenue and Via Manos meet. There, cyclists and pedestrians will take Tyler Street and Andrew Jackson Street for two tenths of a mile to continue on the bike path. Aside from that, there are no at-grade street crossings, traffic signals, or stop signs along the trail. The west terminus is close to Oceanside Transit Center, enabling users to access it by rail. It passes parallel to the runway of Oceanside Municipal Airport. Before it was paved, the right of way was a rail line used by the United States Armed Forces to move cargo along the river.

The trail can be used by pedestrians and bikers, but it does not permit electric bikes capable of more than 20 mph, or equestrian use.

== See also ==
- City of Oceanside Bicycle Map archived here.
- San Diego Regional Bike Map
- List of San Diego bike paths
- Rail trail
