= Oceanside Municipal Airport =

Bob Maxwell Field (Oceanside Municipal Airport)
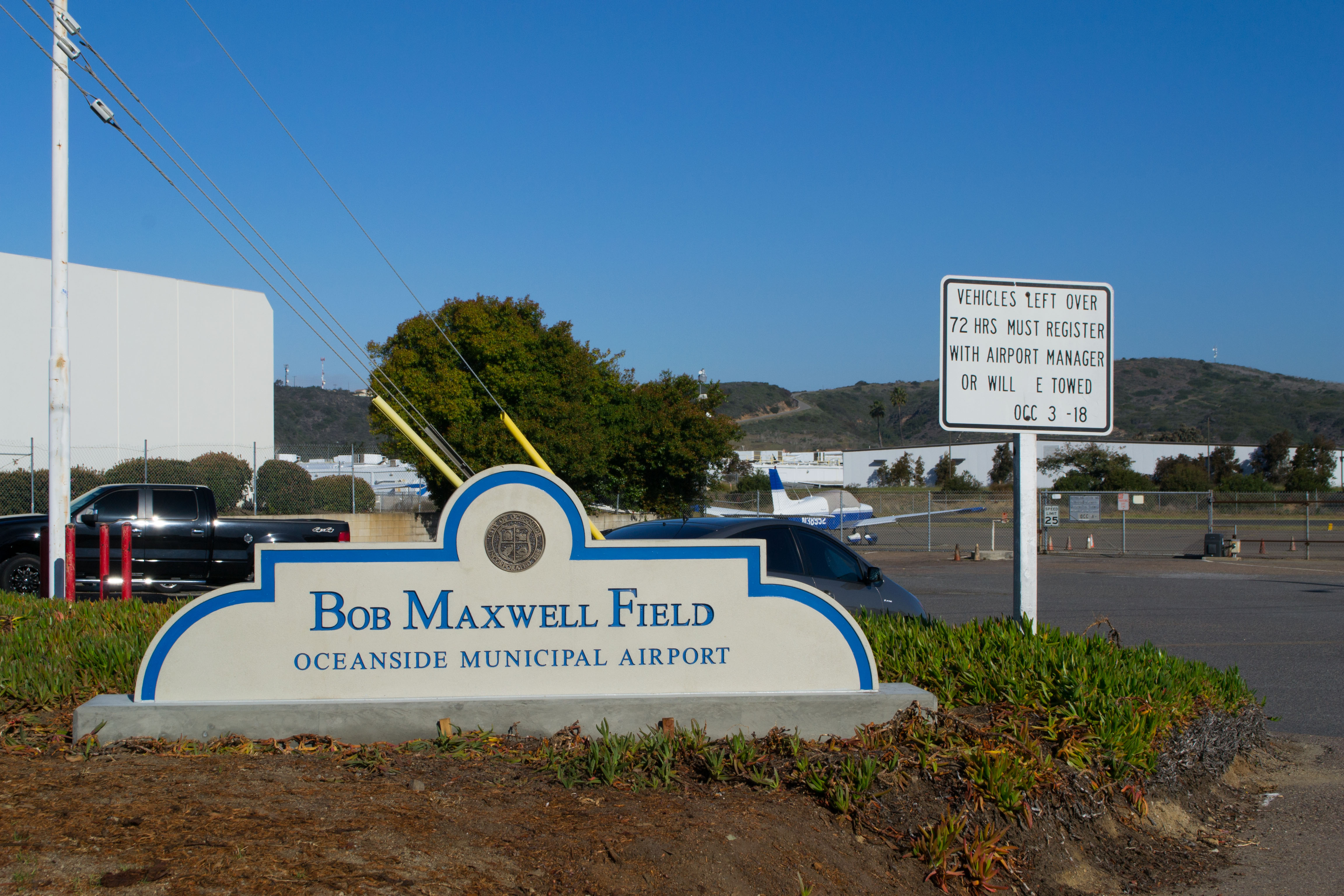
- IATA: OCN; ICAO: KOKB; FAA LID: OKB

Summary
- Airport type: Public
- Operator: City of Oceanside, Airport Property Ventures
- Serves: Northern San Diego County
- Location: Oceanside, California
- Elevation AMSL: 28 ft (8.5 m)
- Coordinates: 33°13′05″N 117°21′05″W
- Website: [oceansidemunicipalairport.com]
- Interactive map of Bob Maxwell Field (Oceanside Municipal Airport)

Runways
Direction	Length		Surface
Direction	ft	m	Surface
07/25	2,712	827	Asphalt

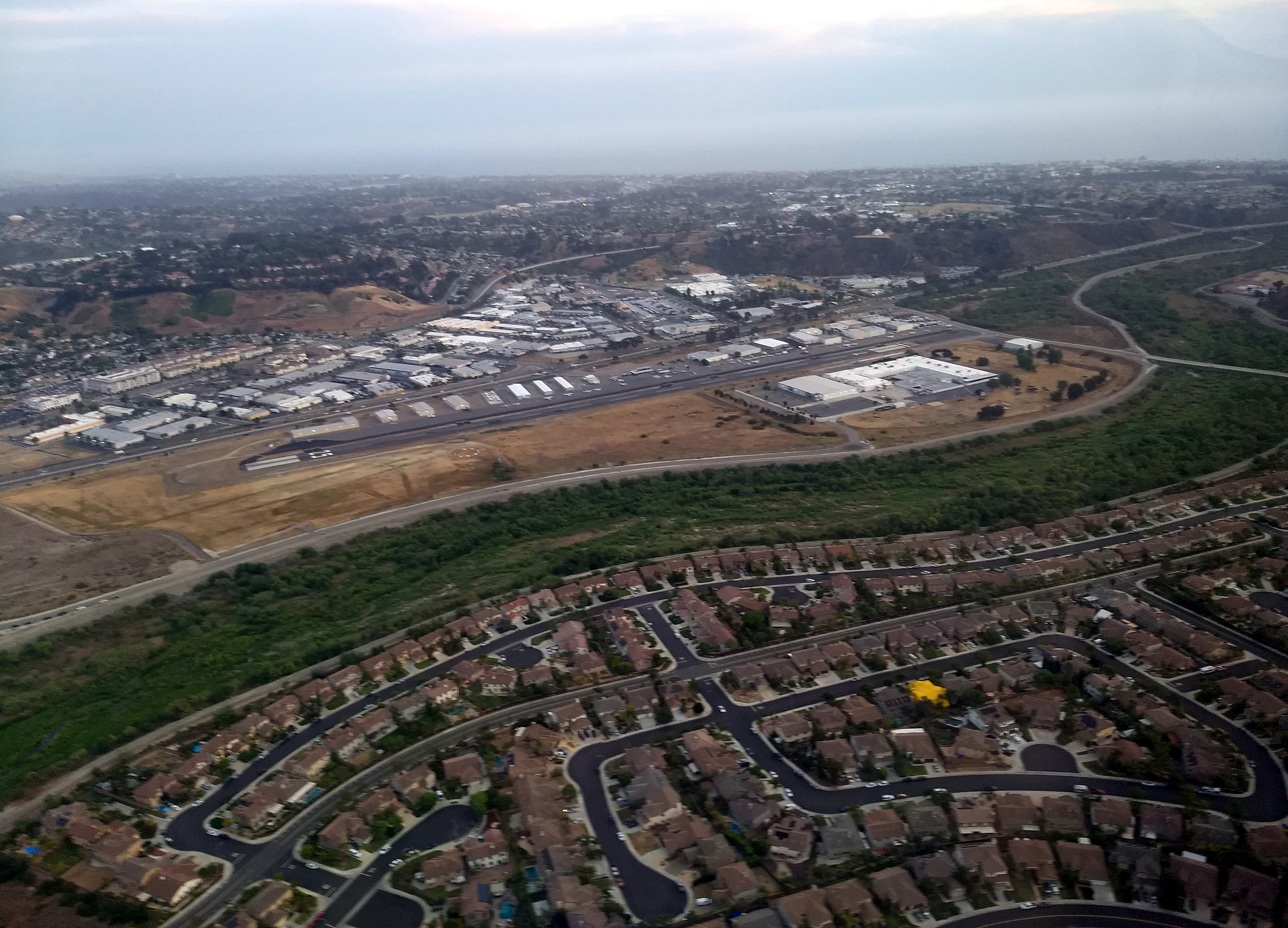
Oceanside Municipal Airport from the air

Oceanside Municipal Airport, also known as the Bob Maxwell Memorial Field (IATA: OCN, ICAO: KOKB, FAA LID: OKB), is a public airport in Oceanside, California, United States. It is located two miles (3 km) northeast of the downtown Oceanside, between California State Route 76 and the San Luis Rey River bike path. The airport covers 43 acres (170,000 m^{2}) and has one runway. It is mostly used for general aviation. The airport is operated and managed by Airport Property Ventures. GoJump Oceanside, a skydiving school, is located at the airport.

Although most U.S. airports use the same three-letter location identifier for the FAA and IATA, Oceanside Municipal Airport is assigned OKB by the FAA and OCN by the IATA. The airport's ICAO identifier is KOKB. The FAA identifier OCN belongs to the Oceanside VORTAC 4 miles west-northwest of the Oceanside Airport.
