= San Luis Rey River =

River in the California, United States of America

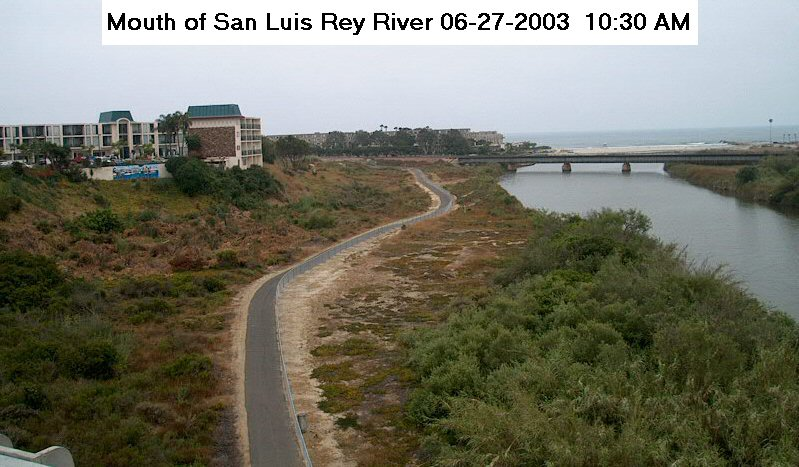
- River mouth from North Coast Hwy bridge.

Location
- Country: United States
- State: California

Physical characteristics
- Source: Lake Henshaw reservoir
  - location: Confluence of West Fork San Luis Rey River and Buena Vista Creek, Cleveland National Forest, San Diego County
  - coordinates: 33°24′02″N 116°37′26″W
  - elevation: 2,627 ft (801 m)
- Mouth: Pacific Ocean
  - location: Oceanside, San Diego County
  - coordinates: 33°12′08″N 117°23′32″W
  - elevation: 0 ft (0 m)
- Length: 69 mi (111 km), East-west
- Basin size: 557 mi^{2} (1,440 km^{2})
- Discharge
  - location: Oceanside
  - average: 36.3 cu ft/s (1.03 m^{3}/s)
  - minimum: 0 cu ft/s (0 m^{3}/s)
  - maximum: 25,700 cu ft/s (730 m^{3}/s)

Basin features
- Tributaries
  - left: Buena Vista Creek
  - right: West Fork San Luis Rey River, Pauma Creek

The San Luis Rey River is a river in northern San Diego County, California.

The river's headwaters are in the Palomar Mountain Range and Cleveland National Forest, near Palomar Mountain and the Santa Rosa Mountains. The river mouth, on the Pacific Ocean, is in northern Oceanside. The San Luis Rey River bike path runs along it for its last 9 miles (14 km).

The river is over 69 miles (111 km) long and drains 562 square miles (1,460 km^{2}). There is little water in the river during most of the year, but it can have very large flows during winter storms.

== Course ==
The San Luis Rey River rises in two main branches. The mainstem starts east of Rocky Mountain in the Cleveland National Forest and flows generally south-southwest. The West Fork's headwaters rise as a pair of tiny streams, Fry Creek and Iron Springs Creek, just to the north of Palomar Mountain. These two streams combine into the West Fork, which flows southeast through the Mendenhall Valley. The West Fork joins the main stem at Lake Henshaw, a reservoir formed by a dam across the main stem San Luis Rey River.

From the base of Henshaw Dam, the river winds west along the foot of the Palomars, followed by California State Route 76. It then bends southwest into a gorge. It leaves the canyon at the wide and spacious Pauma Valley, where it becomes a wash surrounded on both sides by agricultural fields. Potrero and Pauma Creeks enter from the right, then Frey Creek and Agua Tibia Creek as the river travels northwest. The river turns west, passing Pala, flowing through a patchwork of privately owned, government-owned and Native American lands. It then crosses under Interstate 15 and exits the foothills of the mountains near Bonsall.

After passing Bonsall the river flows generally southwest, through the city of Oceanside. Although usually dry up to this point the river starts to contain water as it nears the mouth, both from seeps and from tidal activity that forms a lagoon at the mouth of the river. The San Luis Rey empties into the Pacific north of Oceanside, about 2 miles (3.2 km) south of the Santa Margarita River and about 30 miles (48 km) north of San Diego.

== Water resources ==
The dam that forms Lake Henshaw is the only one directly on the river itself. However, tributaries in the river's watershed are extensively dammed. The San Luis Rey River has natural river banks, except for the last 7 miles (11 km) where it flows through a 400-foot-wide (120 m) earthen channel with levees to prevent stormwater from flooding Oceanside.

Urbanization, mining, and agriculture have caused substantial deterioration of water quality in the drainage basin. Since Lake Henshaw is relatively close to the headwaters, it is a source of drinking water. However, the water in the lower reaches of the river is used for groundwater recharge only. A bridge was completed across the river near its mouth in 2009, replacing a small causeway that washed away in storms.

== History ==
The river was within the homeland of the Luiseño people, or Payómkawichum meaning "People of the West" in the Luiseño language, for many centuries before Spanish settlers occupied their ancestral lands. They are a southern tribe of the indigenous peoples of California.

The first European land exploration of Alta California, the Spanish Portolà expedition, stopped at the river not far from the coast for two nights on its way north, July 18–19, 1769. On the return journey to the new pueblo of San Diego, the party again camped near the river on January 22, 1770. Franciscan missionary Juan Crespi noted in his diary, "...we descended to a large and beautiful valley, so green that it seemed to us that it had been planted. We crossed it straight to the north and pitched camp near a large pool of water, one of several in the plain. At the extremities or ends of the plain there are two large villages."

Mission San Luis Rey de Francia (The Mission of Saint Louis King of France) was founded east of the river in 1798 by padre Fermín Lasuén, becoming the 18th of the 21 Spanish missions of California. The river took its current name from part of the mission's name.

== In popular culture ==
The 2010 Rockstar Games release "Red Dead Redemption" features a river inspired by the San Luis Rey. The "San Luis River" serves as the border between the Western Border States and Mexico and is one of the hallmarks of the game.

== Gallery ==
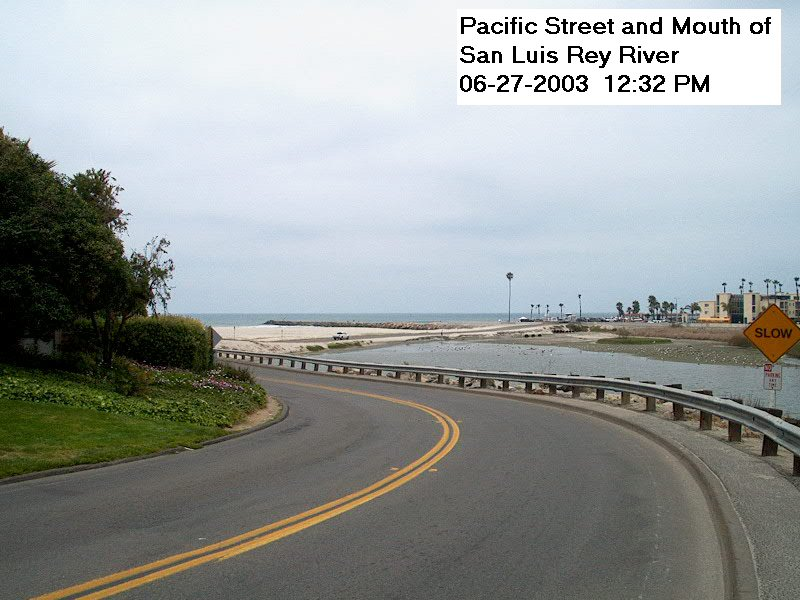
Pacific St and mouth of river

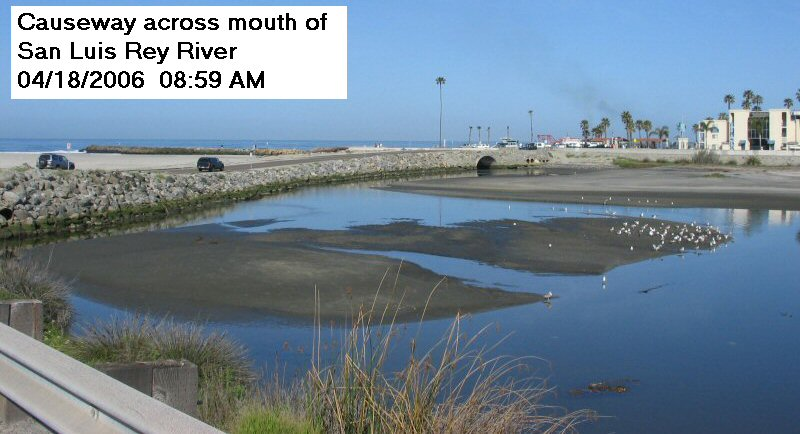
Former causeway across mouth of river

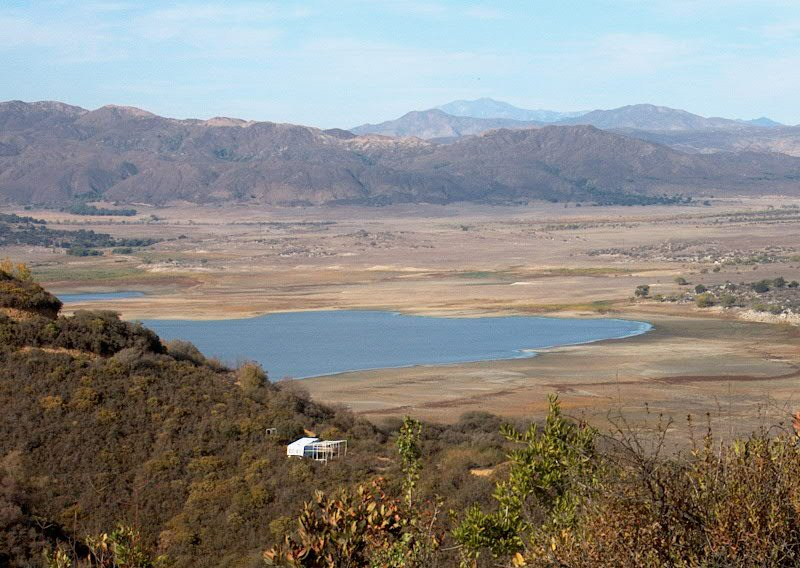
Lake Henshaw from Mesa Grande Rd

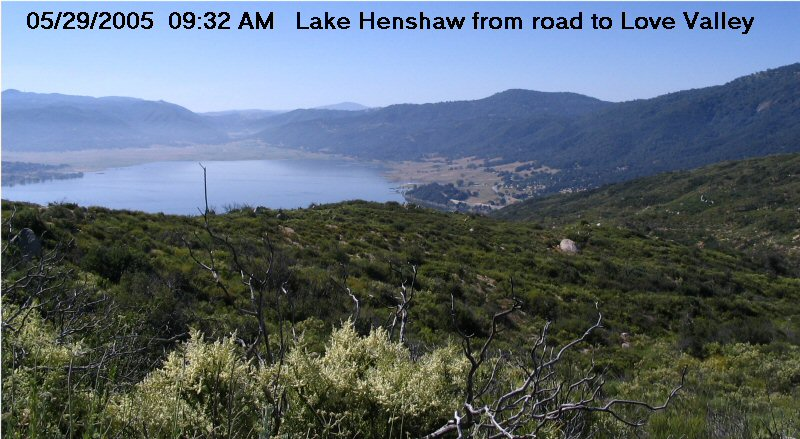
Lake Henshaw from road to Love Valley

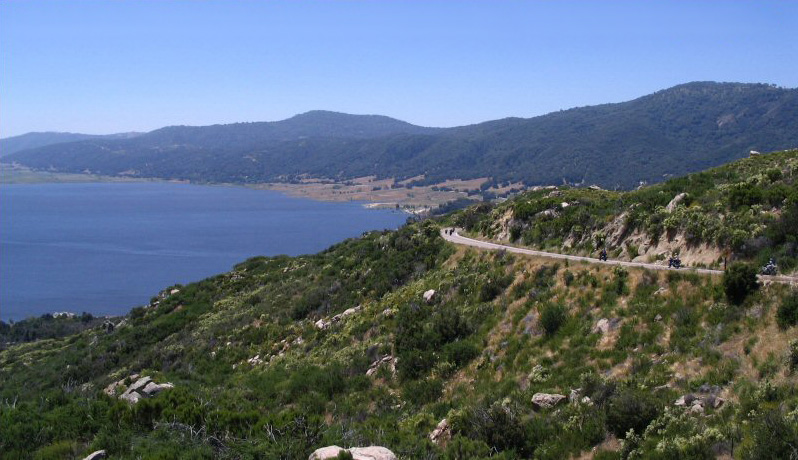
Lake Henshaw from lookout on County Highway S7

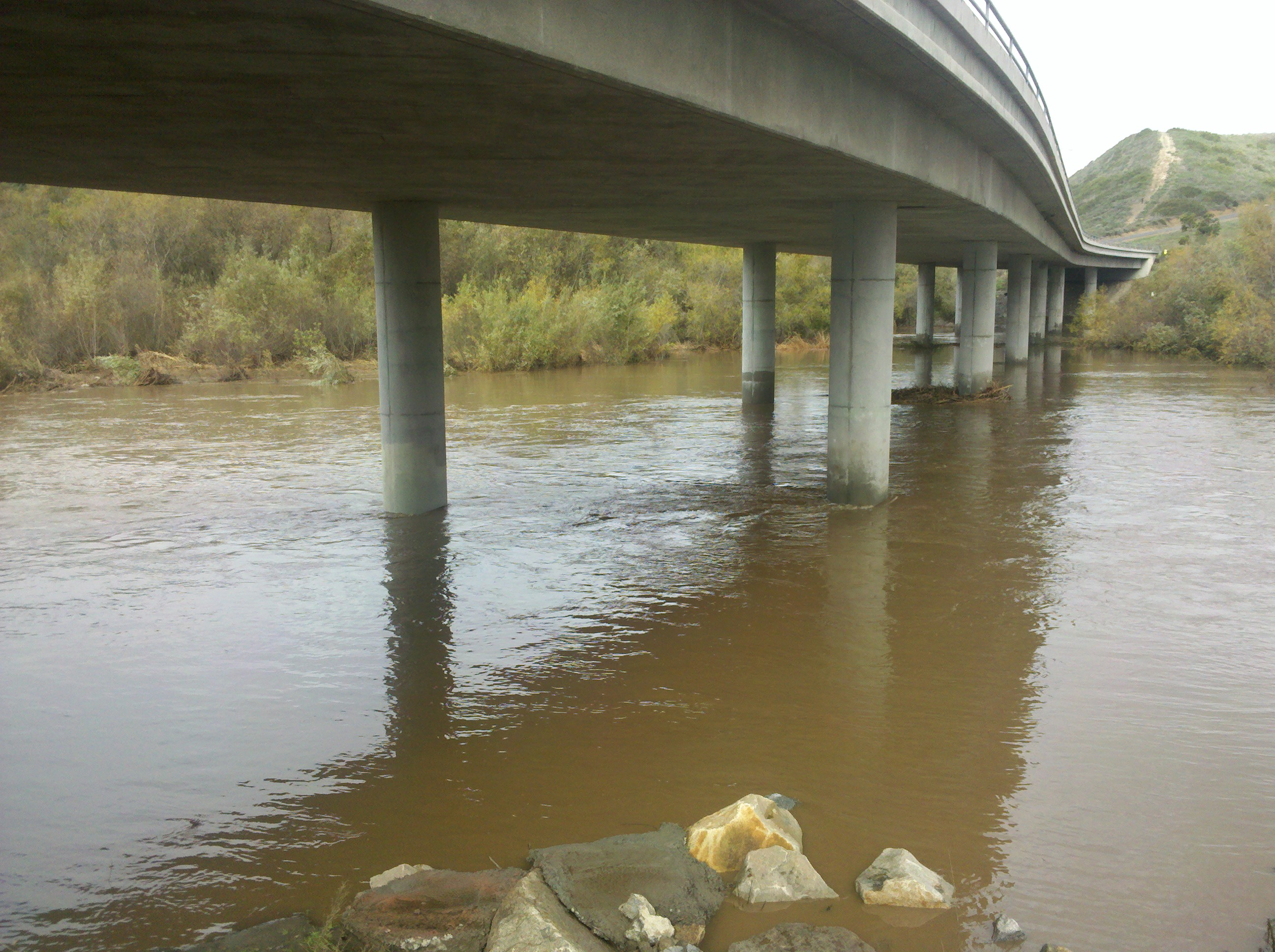
Underneath the Benet Rd bridge after several days of intense rainfall in winter 2010

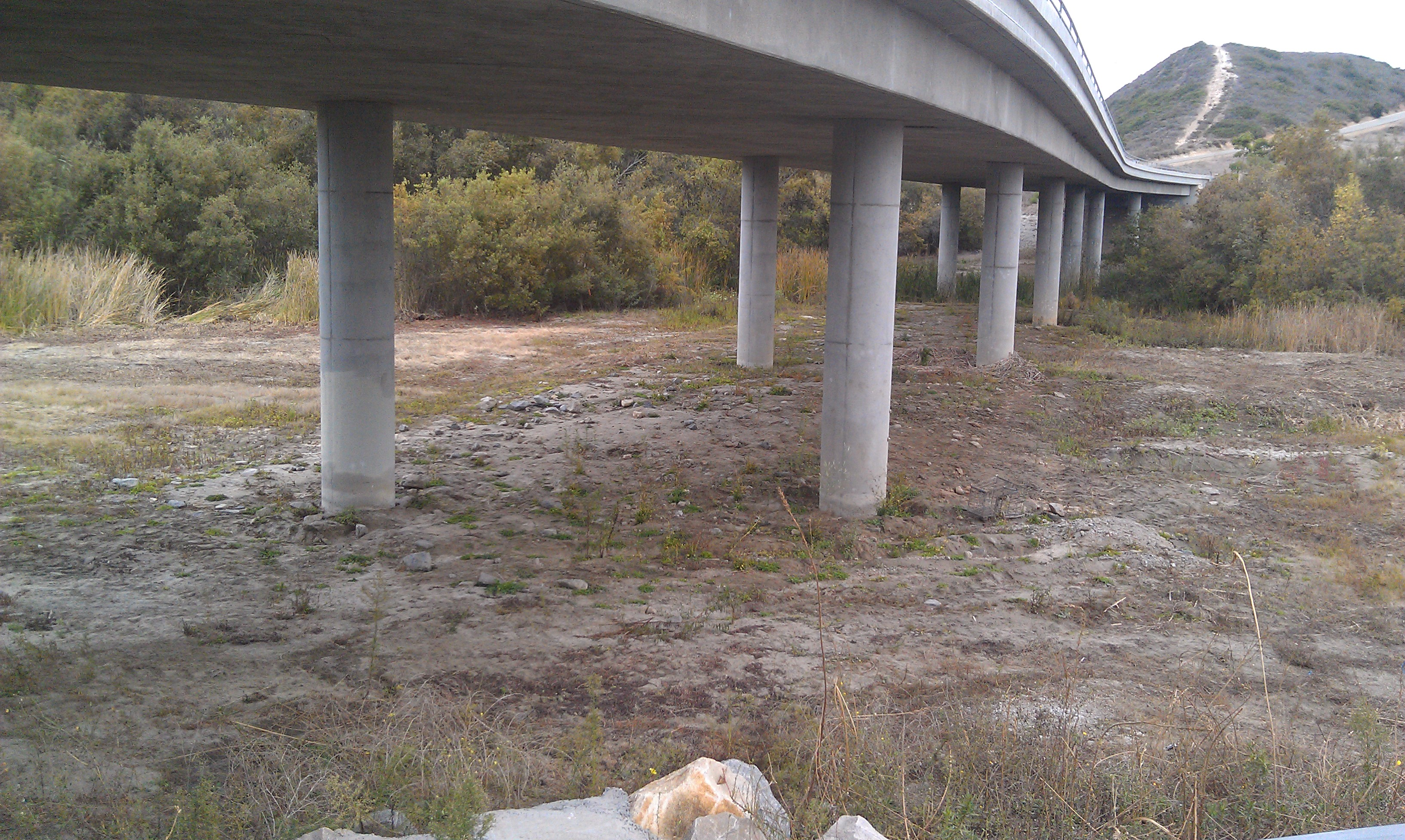
Underneath the Benet Rd bridge as seen most of the year
