= Tri-City Medical Center =

Hospital in California USA, founded 1961

Coordinates: 33°11′7.91″N 117°17′25.63″W

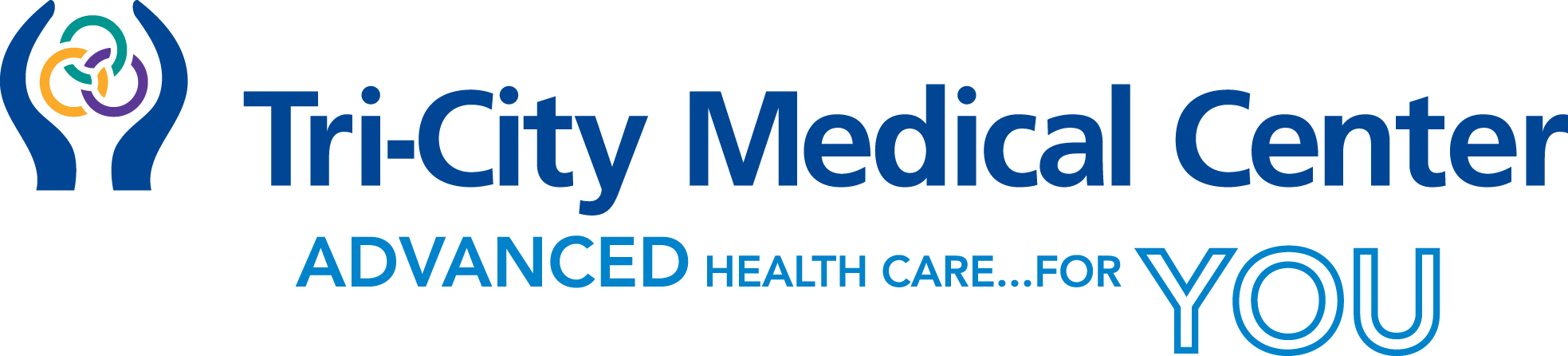

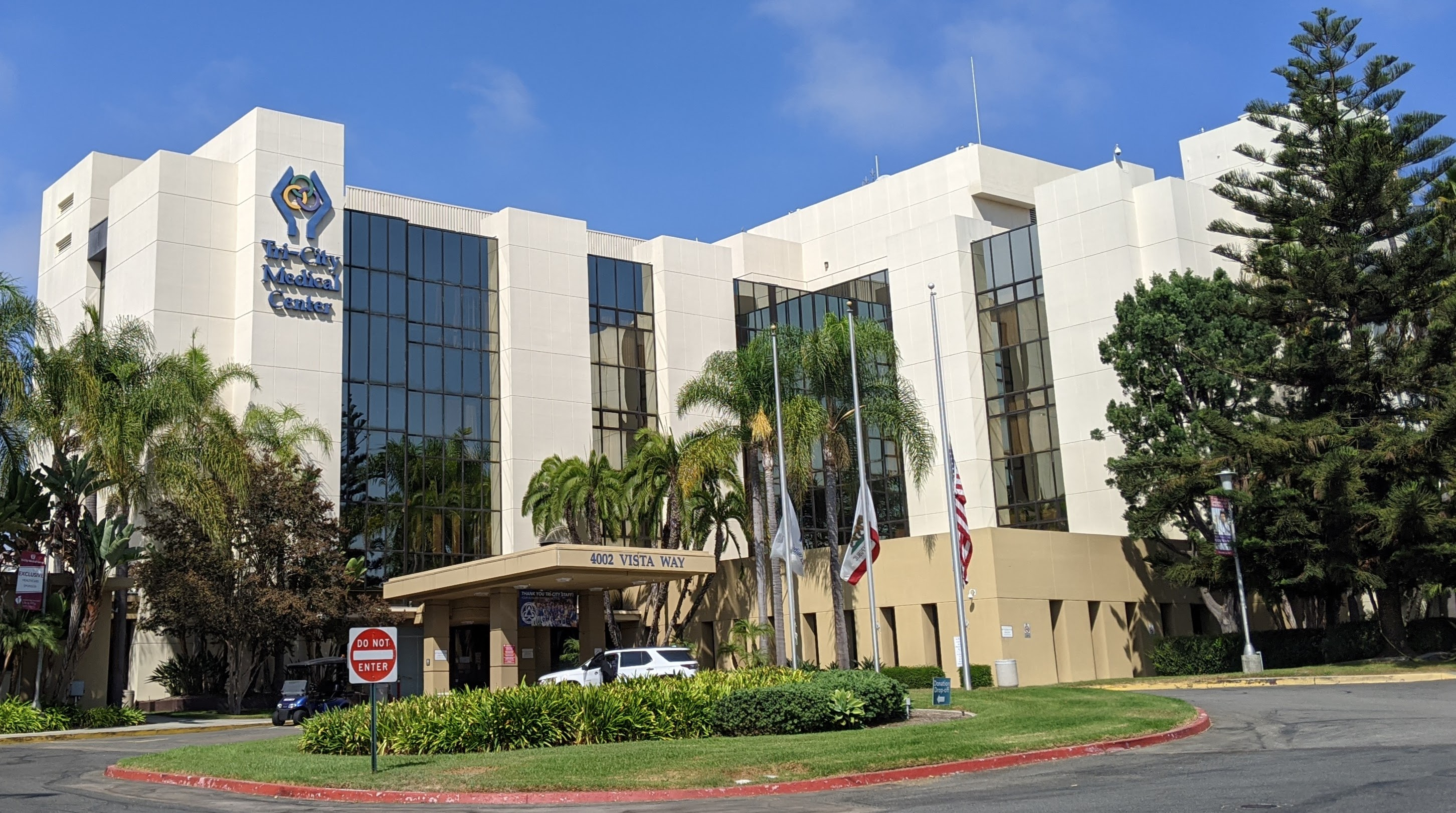
- Type: Community Owned
- Industry: Healthcare
- Founded: Oceanside, United States (1961)
- Founder: Community Leaders (Business and Political)
- Headquarters: Oceanside, California, United States
- Area served: Tri-City, California
- Key people: Nandan Prasad, MD (CMO)
- Services: Heart Care, Orthopedics, Robotic Surgery, Emergency Services, Cancer, Behavioral Health
- Revenue: US$400 Million
- Number of employees: 1,500
- Website: www.sharp.com/locations/hospitals/sharp-tri-city

Tri-City Medical Center (Tri-City or TCMC), founded in 1961, is a full-service, acute-care public hospital in Oceanside, California. Located 40 miles north of San Diego, Tri-City serves three major cities in the North County section of San Diego County: Oceanside, Vista, and Carlsbad. The hospital also owns and operates nearby outpatient services.

TCMC is administered by the Tri-City Healthcare District, a Health District of California.

== History ==
The Tri-City Medical Center was founded in 1961 after voters elected to form the Tri-City Hospital District, approving a bond issue to pay for the cost of land and construction. At the time, northern San Diego County was a rural area with little medical infrastructure, and community leaders from Carlsbad, Oceanside, and Vista knew the region needed a modern local hospital in order to grow. The finished product, originally named the Tri-City Hospital, was the outcome of their labor.

When Tri-City Medical Center first opened, it was a relatively small facility, with only 42 physicians on staff; as North County's population continued to grow, it quickly became apparent that the hospital would need to expand. In the 1970s, responding to demand, Tri-City added a cardiopulmonary lab, additional surgical suites, and a 42-bed maternity unit. In the 1980s, the hospital expanded further, adding a four-story wing and remodeling existing facilities. It also increased its range of services, creating a mental health unit and a dialysis center, and began providing cardiac rehabilitation. By the time Tri-City Hospital changed its name to Tri-City Medical Center in 1985, the hospital had also developed a magnetic resonance imaging center, a neonatal intensive care unit, and an updated emergency department.

== Medical Specialties ==
As a full-service public hospital, Tri-City Medical Center provides a wide range of healthcare services, including behavioral health services, home health care, and rehabilitation services. The following services, however, are considered to be its medical specialties:

- Cancer: Accredited by the American College of Surgeons Commission on Cancer, Tri-City's cancer service provides chemotherapy, hormone therapy, immune or targeted therapy, and radiation therapy treatment. In 2016, Tri-City Medical Center became one of the first hospitals in San Diego County to offer intraoperative radiation therapy for patients with early-stage breast cancer.
- Emergency Services: The TCMC Emergency Department contains a San Diego County designated Heart Attack Receiving Center, as well a Joint Commission designated Primary Stroke Receiving Center. The department provides 41 beds for critical injuries and illnesses, as well as six beds for less severe illnesses and injuries.
- Heart Care: Tri-City Medical Center's Cardiovascular Health Institute provides cardiothoracic surgery, interventional radiology, and vascular surgery, among other cardiological services. The recipient of the Joint Commission's Gold Seal of Approval for Primary Stroke Centers, the institute also became, in 2009, the first nationally accredited Chest Pain Center in San Diego County.
- Orthopedics: TCMC's Orthopaedic and Spine Institute performs hip, knee, and shoulder replacements, as well as laminectomies and spinal fusions, among other orthopaedic procedures. In July 2012, Tri-City became the first hospital in San Diego County to perform a Vitamin E Total Knee Replacement.
- Robotic Surgery: Tri-City uses robotic systems to perform a number of surgical procedures, and is the only hospital in San Diego County with more than one such system: the hospital implements the Da Vinci Surgical System to perform select procedures in general surgery, gynecology, heart care, orthopaedics, and urology.

== Facilities and Current Operations ==
Tri-City Medical Center's main campus is located at 4002 Vista Way in Oceanside, California.

Adjacent to Tri-City Wellness Center, located at 6260 El Camino Real, is the award-winning Center for Wound Care & Hyperbaric Medicine. Together, the hospital system has a partnership with more than 700 physicians and handles nearly 200,000 outpatient visitors a year, about 17,000 of whom are admitted.

The hospital's 388 licensed beds are utilized to a wide variety of ends. Tri-City treats around 92,000 patients a year on an outpatient basis and over 70,000 patients a year through its 24-hour Emergency Department.

Tri-City Medical Center is led by CEO, Dr. Gene Ma.
