= Lake Henshaw =

Lake in San Diego County, California

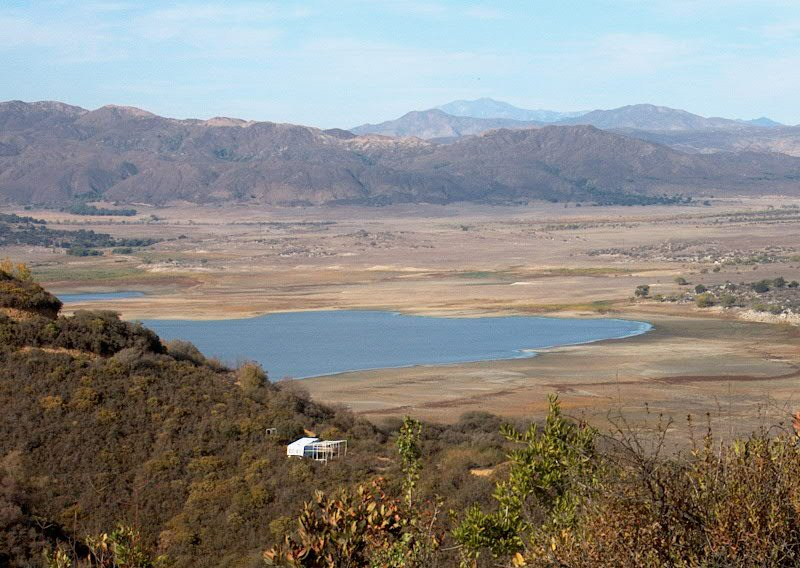
- Lake Henshaw from Mesa Grande Road

- Location within California Location within the United States
- Location: San Diego County, California
- Coordinates: 33°14′30″N 116°45′47″W
- Type: Reservoir
- Catchment area: 217 square miles (560 km^{2})
- Basin countries: United States
- Managing agency: Vista Irrigation District
- Surface area: 1,140 acres (460 ha)
- Water volume: 55,000 acre-feet (68,000,000 m^{3})
- Shore length^{1}: 5 miles (8.0 km)
- Surface elevation: 2,723 feet (830 m)
- ^{1} Shore length is not a well-defined measure.

Lake Henshaw (Kumiai: Henatt) is a reservoir in San Diego County, California, at the southeast base of Palomar Mountain, approximately 70 miles (110 km) northeast of San Diego and 100 miles (160 km) southeast of Los Angeles.

The lake covers approximately 1,140 acres (460 ha) and holds 55,000 acre-feet (68,000,000 m^{3}) of water when full (lowered in 1978 from its original capacity of 203,581 acre-feet (251,113,000 m^{3}) out of earthquake concerns), in addition to groundwater stored in its local basin. It drains an area of 207 square miles (540 km^{2}) at the source of the San Luis Rey River.

The lake was constructed in 1923 (103 years ago) with the building of Henshaw Dam, an earth dam 123 feet (37 m) tall and 650 feet (200 m) long. It is owned by the Vista Irrigation District and used primarily for agricultural irrigation.

The lake features opportunities for catfish and carp fishing. Boats and cabins are available for rental. It hosts The Carp Throwdown fly fishing tournament organized by the Fly Stop.

== Climate ==
Climate data for Henshaw Dam, 2723 feet above sea level (1991–2020 normals, extremes 1942–present)
| Month | Jan | Feb | Mar | Apr | May | Jun | Jul | Aug | Sep | Oct | Nov | Dec | Year |
|---|---|---|---|---|---|---|---|---|---|---|---|---|---|
| Record high °F (°C) | 89 (32) | 84 (29) | 90 (32) | 93 (34) | 104 (40) | 109 (43) | 120 (49) | 113 (45) | 109 (43) | 113 (45) | 92 (33) | 84 (29) | 120 (49) |
| Mean daily maximum °F (°C) | 60.5 (15.8) | 60.9 (16.1) | 64.7 (18.2) | 69.1 (20.6) | 75.3 (24.1) | 84.7 (29.3) | 91.9 (33.3) | 93.5 (34.2) | 88.8 (31.6) | 78.6 (25.9) | 68.5 (20.3) | 59.8 (15.4) | 74.7 (23.7) |
| Daily mean °F (°C) | 45.7 (7.6) | 46.6 (8.1) | 49.9 (9.9) | 53.3 (11.8) | 59.2 (15.1) | 65.6 (18.7) | 72.6 (22.6) | 73.7 (23.2) | 68.7 (20.4) | 59.4 (15.2) | 51.2 (10.7) | 44.7 (7.1) | 57.6 (14.2) |
| Mean daily minimum °F (°C) | 30.9 (−0.6) | 32.4 (0.2) | 35.1 (1.7) | 37.5 (3.1) | 43.1 (6.2) | 46.4 (8.0) | 53.4 (11.9) | 53.8 (12.1) | 48.6 (9.2) | 40.2 (4.6) | 33.9 (1.1) | 29.5 (−1.4) | 40.4 (4.7) |
| Record low °F (°C) | 8 (−13) | 12 (−11) | 13 (−11) | 21 (−6) | 26 (−3) | 29 (−2) | 33 (1) | 31 (−1) | 26 (−3) | 20 (−7) | 11 (−12) | 9 (−13) | 8 (−13) |
| Average precipitation inches (mm) | 5.26 (134) | 5.88 (149) | 4.09 (104) | 1.73 (44) | 0.70 (18) | 0.11 (2.8) | 0.18 (4.6) | 0.29 (7.4) | 0.44 (11) | 0.93 (24) | 1.87 (47) | 3.75 (95) | 25.23 (641) |
| Average precipitation days (≥ 0.01 in) | 7.5 | 8.7 | 7.3 | 5.3 | 2.9 | 0.5 | 1.1 | 1.1 | 1.6 | 3.0 | 4.4 | 7.0 | 50.4 |
Source: NOAA

== See also ==
- List of dams and reservoirs in California
- List of lakes in California
