= Oceanside, California =

City in California, United States

- City
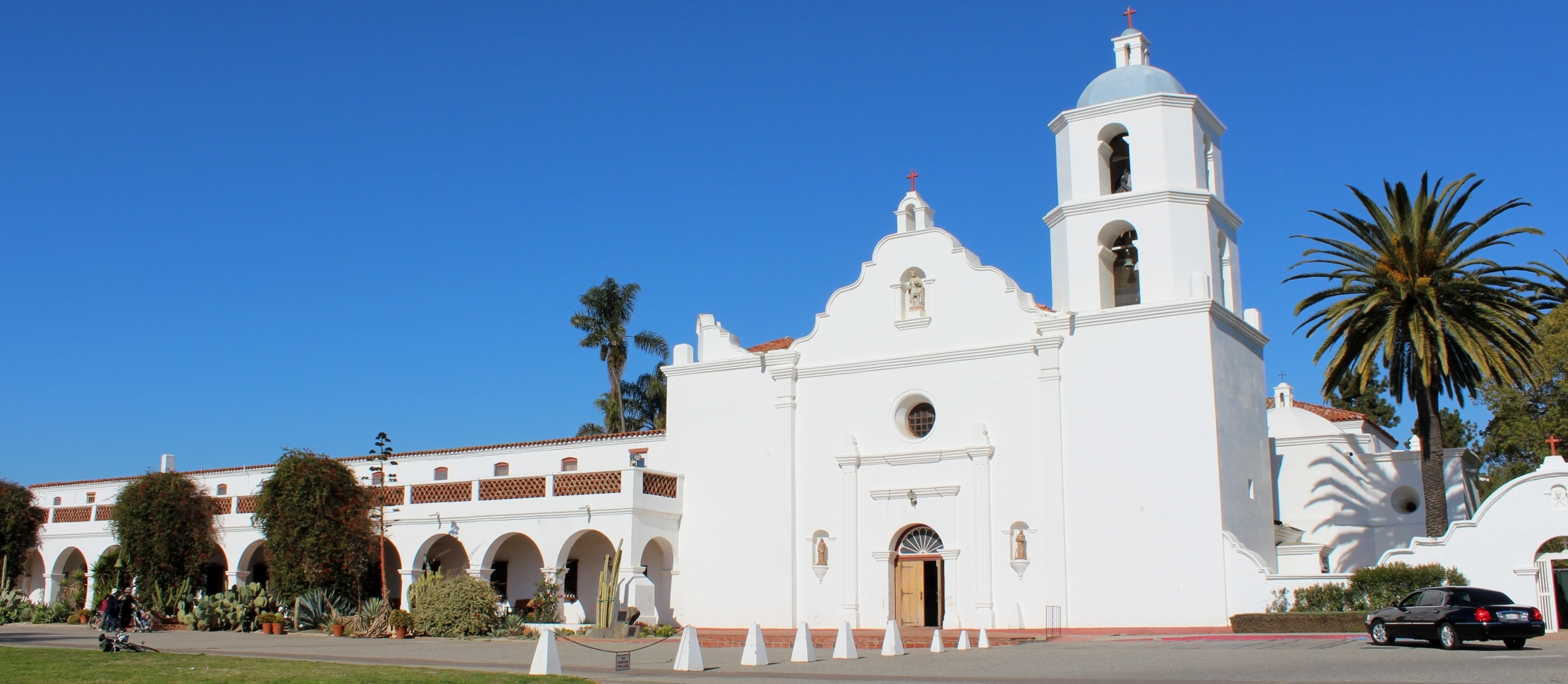
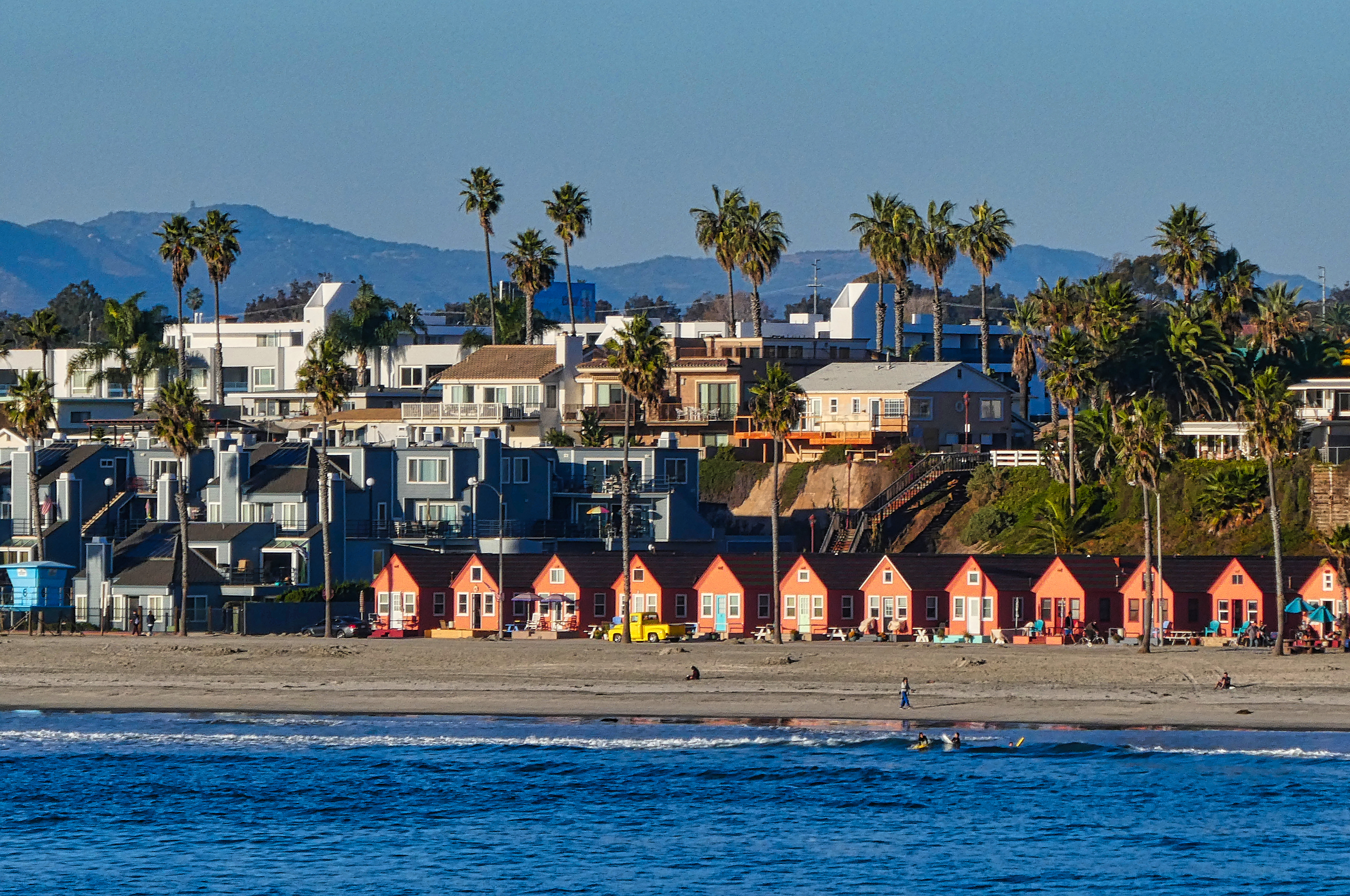
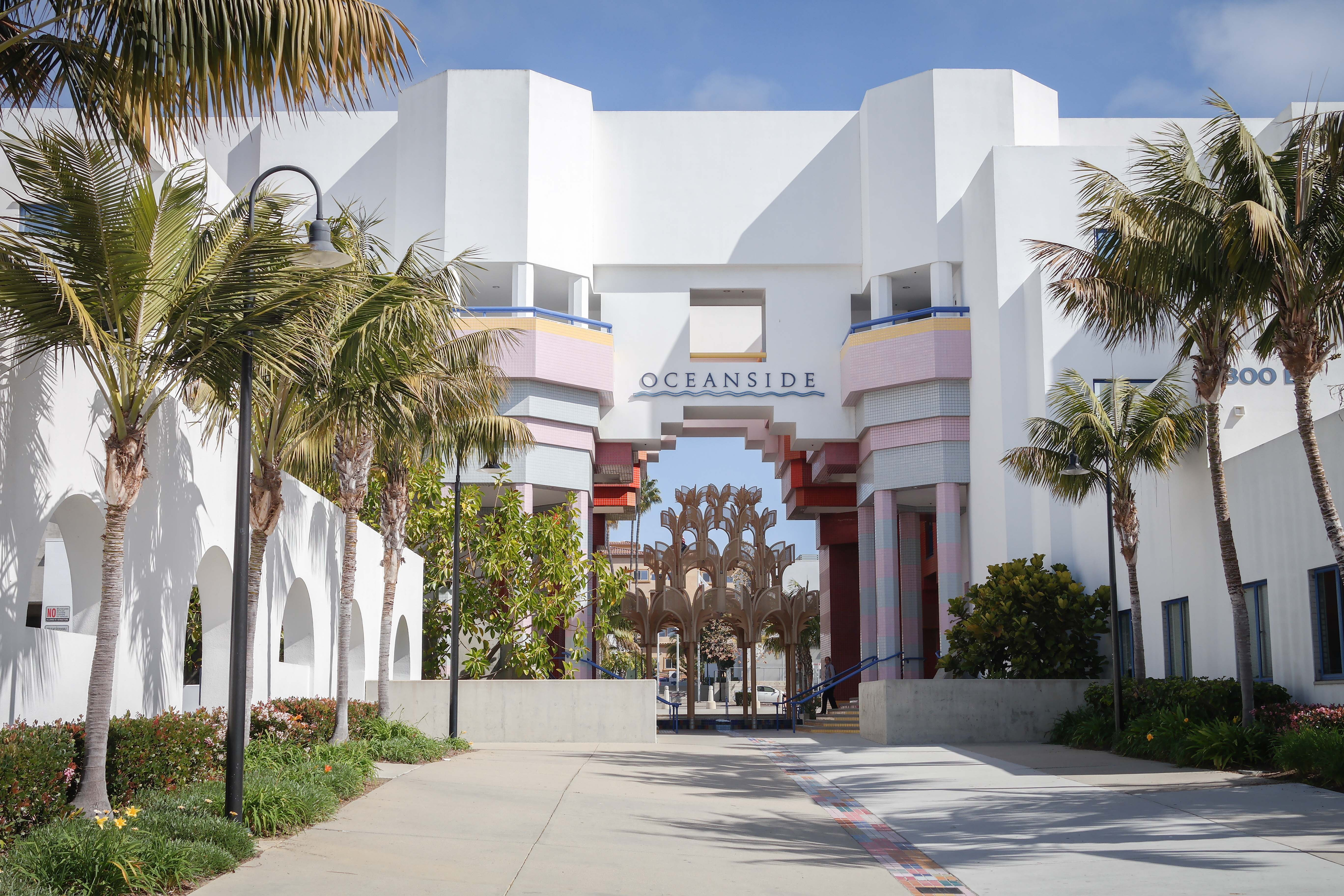
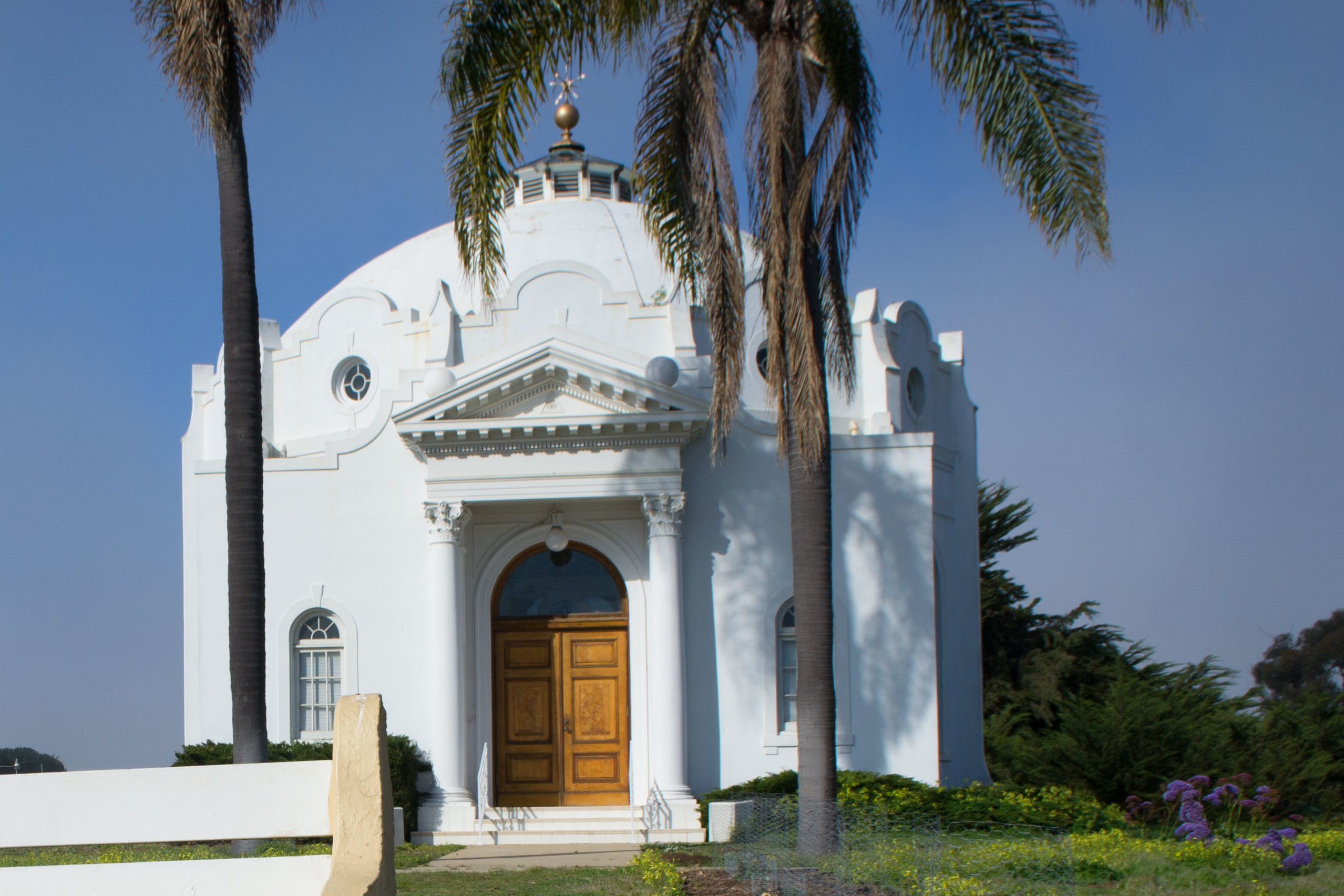
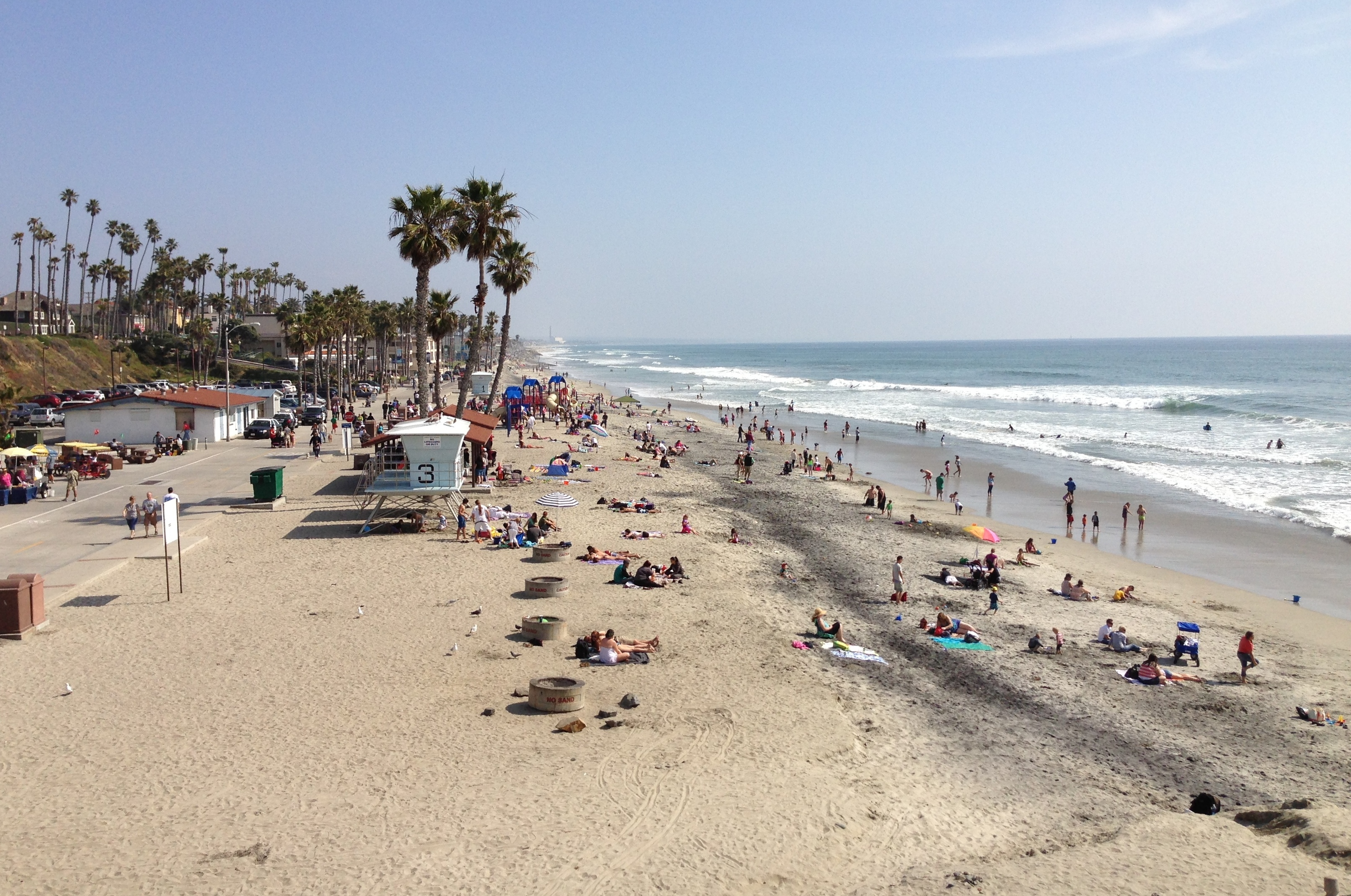
- Clockwise: Mission San Luis Rey de Francia; Oceanside City Hall; Oceanside Strand; Mount Ecclesia; Roberts Cottages

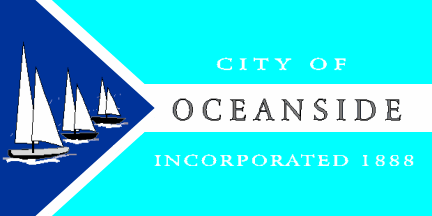
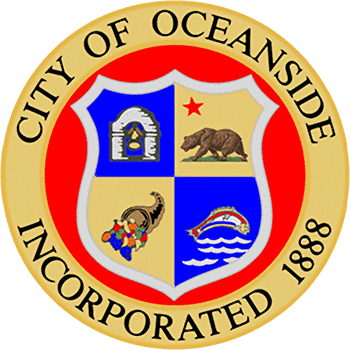
- Flag Seal
- Interactive map of Oceanside, California
- Location within San Diego County Location within California Location within the United States
- Coordinates: 33°12′42″N 117°19′33″W
- Country: United States
- State: California
- County: San Diego
- Incorporated: July 3, 1888

Government
  - Type: Council–manager
  - Mayor: Esther Sanchez

Area
  - Total: 42.16 sq mi (109.19 km^{2})
  - Land: 41.26 sq mi (106.85 km^{2})
  - Water: 0.90 sq mi (2.33 km^{2}) 2.23%
- Elevation: 0–66 ft (0–20 m)

Population (2020)
  - Total: 174,068
  - Estimate (2024): 171,483
  - Rank: 3rd in San Diego County; 29th in California; 156th in the United States
  - Density: 4,259.8/sq mi (1,644.73/km^{2})
- Demonym(s): Oceansider; O'sider
- Time zone: UTC−8 (Pacific)
  - Summer (DST): UTC−7 (PDT)
- ZIP Codes: 92049, 92051–92052, 92054, 92056–92058
- Area codes: 442/760
- FIPS code: 06-53322
- GNIS feature IDs: 1652761, 2411301
- City flower: Crimson Lake Bougainvillea
- Website: ci.oceanside.ca.us

Oceanside is a beach city in the North County area of San Diego County, California, United States. The city had a population of 174,068 at the 2020 United States census, making it the most populous city in the North County region of San Diego. The city is a popular tourist destination, owing to its historic landmarks, beaches, and architecture.

Oceanside's origins date to 1798, when the Spanish founded the village of San Luis Rey with the establishment of Mission San Luis Rey de Francia by Fermín de Lasuén. During the Spanish period, Mission San Luis Rey grew to be the largest of all the Californian missions, but following the Mexican secularization act of 1833 the mission and its community declined. Following the U.S. conquest of California, the former mission lands were developed into an oceanfront resort and the community's name gradually changed to Oceanside.

== History ==
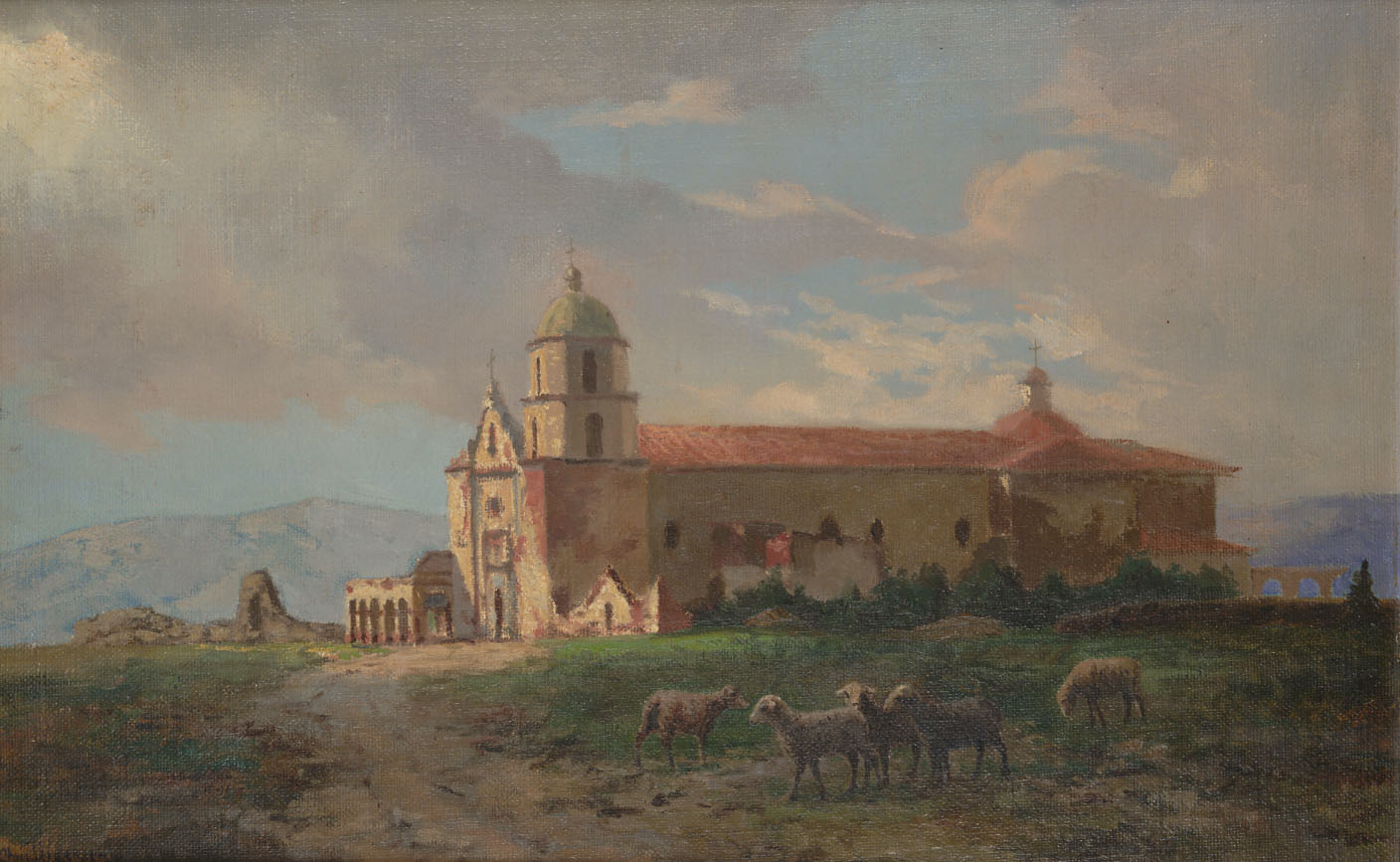
Oceanside's origins date to 1798, when the Spanish founded Mission San Luis Rey de Francia under the leadership of Fermín de Lasuén.

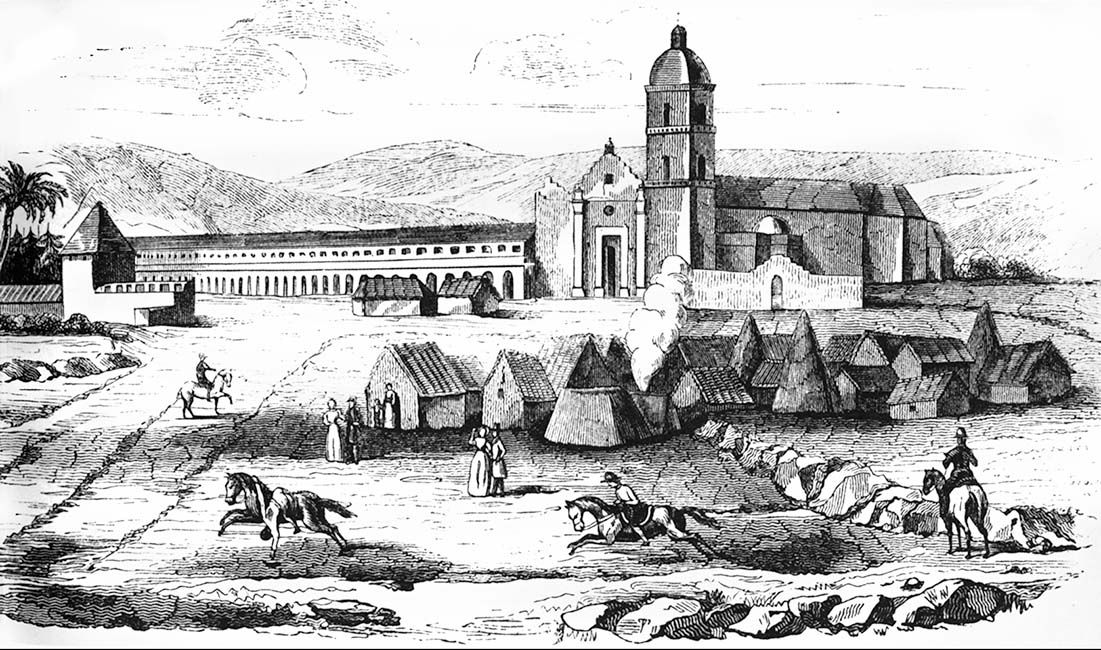
The village of San Luis Rey and its mission in 1827

Originally inhabited by Native Americans, Oceanside was first settled by the Luiseño peoples, or the Payomkawichum. The city of Oceanside sits on the locality on the San Luis Rey River that the Luiseño called Tacayme, which contained the villages of Qée'ish (Keish) and 'ikáymay (Ikamal), in the San Luis Rey Mission area, Wiyóoya (Wiawio) at the mouth of the river, and Wi'áasamay (Wiasamai) and Waxáwmay (Wahaumai) at Guajome.

=== Spanish era ===
The first European explorers arrived in 1769. Spanish missionaries under Father Junípero Serra founded Mission San Luis Rey de Francia on a former site of a Luiseño Indian village on the banks of the San Luis Rey River called Keish according to the Portolà expedition who visited in the 1769.

In the early 19th century, the introduction of farming and grazing changed the landscape of what would become Oceanside.

=== Mexican era ===
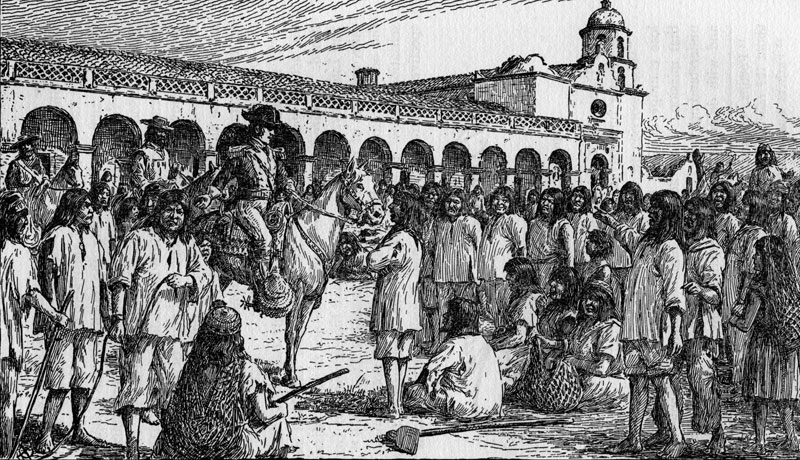
Luiseños refusing to work for Captain Pablo de la Portillà in 1835

Following the Mexican secularization act of 1833, the Californian missions were nationalized, transferring their ownership from the Franciscan Order of the Catholic Church to the Mexican Government. A mission administrator was appointed to each mission to oversee the process of secularization, the removal of the priests, and the selling or granting of the mission lands to private citizens.

At Mission San Luis Rey, Padre Antonio Peyrí had presided over the mission for 34 years when soldiers forced his removal in late 1833. Captain Pablo de la Portillà was appointed as administrator of San Luis Rey. Following the departure of Padre Peyrí, relations between the Luiseños and the new civilian administration hugely deteriorated, resulting in their famed refusal to work for Captain Portillà in 1835.

=== American era ===
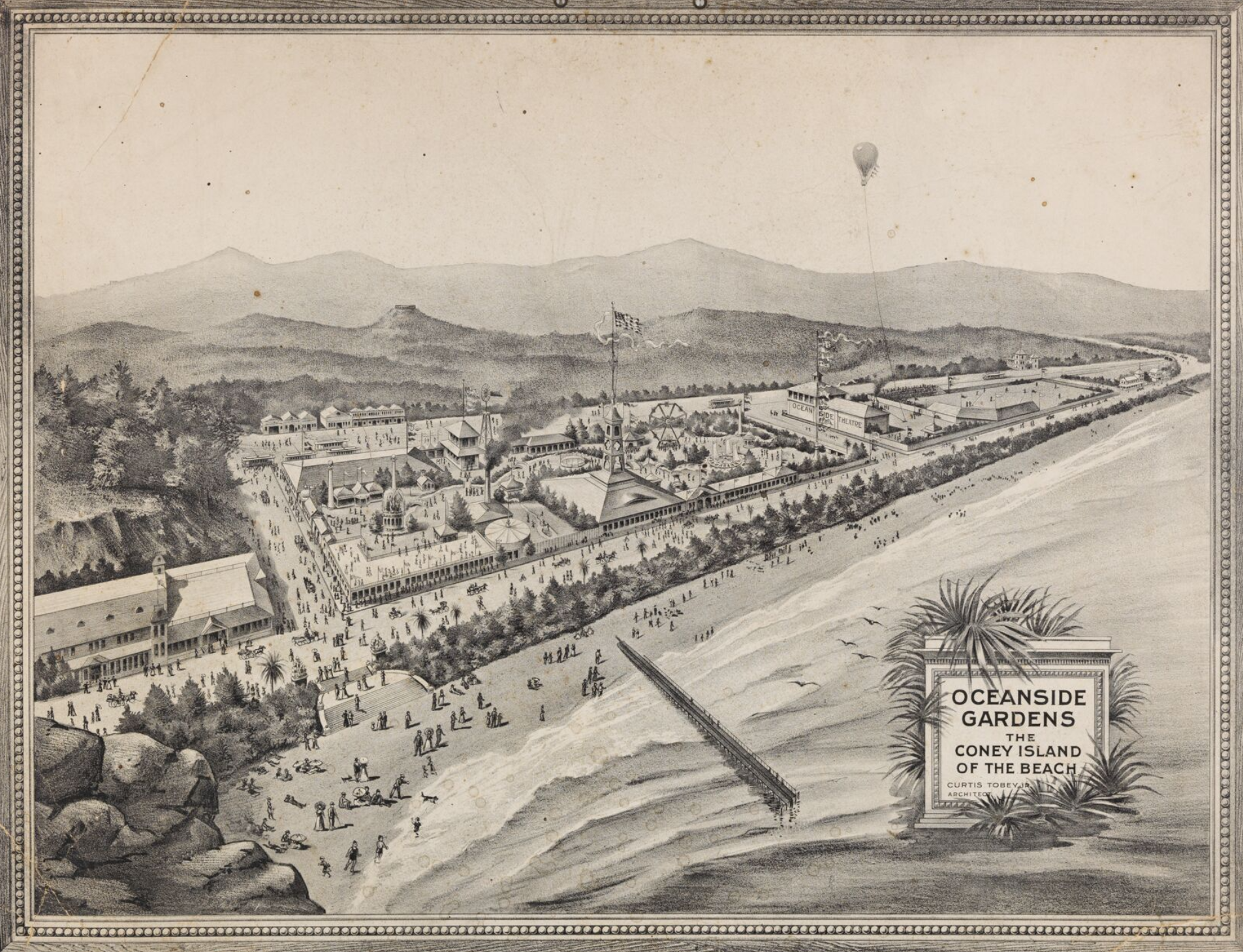
View of Oceanside at the turn of the 19th and 20th centuries

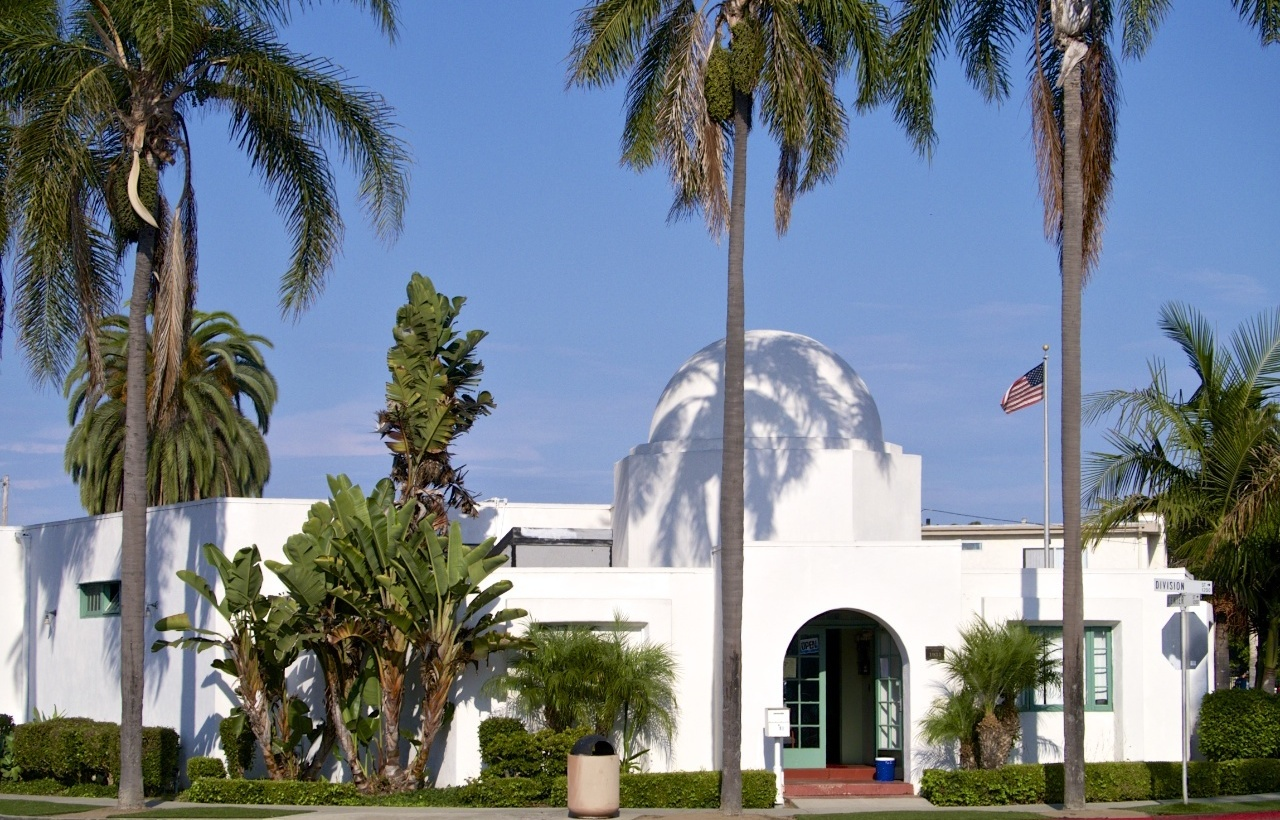
The Americanization School was built in 1931 as a segregated school which aimed at Americanizing Oceanside's Hispanic community.

In the late 1850s, Andrew Jackson Myers, an emigrant from Illinois, lived in San Joaquin County, but he returned in the late 1880s and lived in San Luis Rey. In 1882 Myers moved on the land that was the original townsite for Oceanside. A patent for the land was issued in 1883 by the federal government. It was incorporated on July 3, 1888. The city hall as of the early 21st century stands on the former Myers homestead.

The town post office contains an oil-on-canvas mural, Air Mail, painted in 1937 by Elsie Seeds. Federally commissioned murals were produced from 1934 to 1943 in the United States through the Section of Painting and Sculpture, later called the Section of Fine Arts, of the Treasury Department.

Oceanside continues to be known as a vacation home market.

In the 2010s, several mid-rise and high-rise housing and lodging projects were completed in the downtown area, with more to come. In 2021, two large Hyatt resorts were completed, bringing more tourists to the city.

== Geography ==
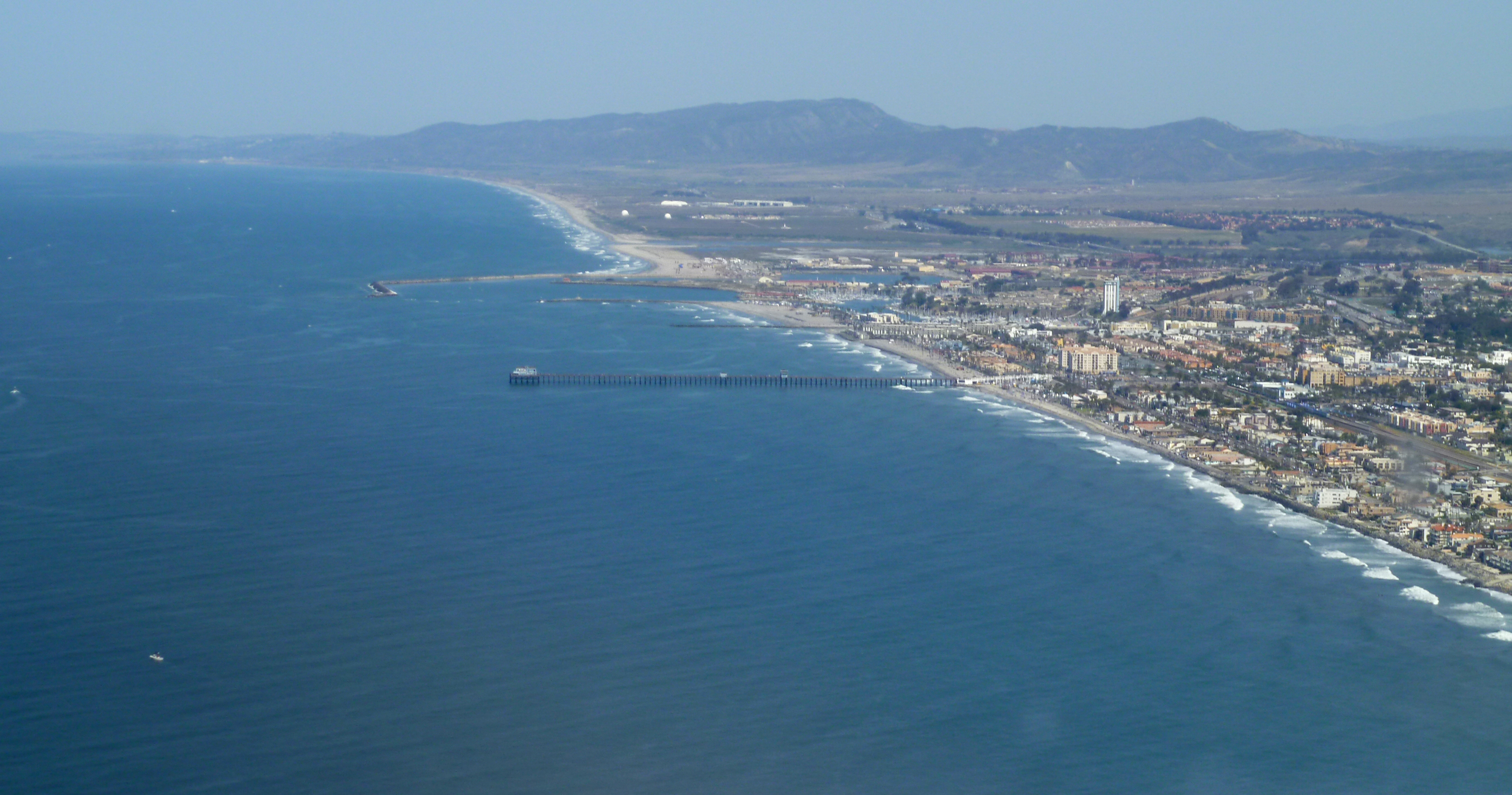
Aerial view of Oceanside and the Oceanside Pier

According to the United States Census Bureau, the city has a total area of 42.2 square miles (109 km^{2}), of which 41.2 square miles (107 km^{2}) is land and 0.9 square miles (2.3 km^{2}), comprising 2.23%, is water.

Traveling north on Interstate 5, Oceanside is the last city before Orange County. It is roughly the same distance from Aliso Viejo as it is to downtown San Diego.

Together with Carlsbad and Vista, it forms a tri-city area.

=== Climate ===
Oceanside experiences a mild semi-arid climate (Köppen climate classification: BSk) that is significantly tempered by maritime winds and the cool currents off the shoreline. The average high temperatures range from 64 to 77 °F (18 to 25 °C), while the average low temperatures range from 45 to 64 °F (7 to 18 °C).

=== Coastal erosion ===
Beaches in Oceanside are subject to coastal erosion that in some places left only a small strip of sand between the ocean and main road. In 2025 efforts were made with the RE:BEACH program to add sand to the beach in a process known as beach nourishment.

Beach in Oceanside

Coastal communities such as Del Mar and Oceanside are facing the threat of possible winter storms. These winter storms pose threats like hazardous beach conditions, beach erosion, and rip currents. Communities are preparing for the possible winter storms. Currently they are helping protect their neighborhoods and beaches from these threats. The possible coastal erosion can also be caused by factors such as the warming climate.

Climate data for Oceanside, California, 1991–2020 normals, extremes 1910–present
Month	Jan	Feb	Mar	Apr	May	Jun	Jul	Aug	Sep	Oct	Nov	Dec	Year
Record high °F (°C)	87 (31)	90 (32)	88 (31)	85 (29)	85 (29)	87 (31)	90 (32)	94 (34)	95 (35)	97 (36)	97 (36)	90 (32)	97 (36)
Mean maximum °F (°C)	77.2 (25.1)	73.9 (23.3)	72.7 (22.6)	72.9 (22.7)	70.6 (21.4)	71.1 (21.7)	75.2 (24.0)	77.1 (25.1)	79.7 (26.5)	82.2 (27.9)	82.0 (27.8)	75.4 (24.1)	87.8 (31.0)
Mean daily maximum °F (°C)	62.7 (17.1)	62.0 (16.7)	61.9 (16.6)	63.4 (17.4)	64.6 (18.1)	66.4 (19.1)	69.9 (21.1)	71.3 (21.8)	71.2 (21.8)	69.5 (20.8)	66.7 (19.3)	63.2 (17.3)	66.1 (18.9)
Daily mean °F (°C)	55.0 (12.8)	55.0 (12.8)	56.3 (13.5)	58.4 (14.7)	61.3 (16.3)	63.8 (17.7)	67.4 (19.7)	68.4 (20.2)	67.3 (19.6)	63.9 (17.7)	59.1 (15.1)	54.9 (12.7)	60.9 (16.1)
Mean daily minimum °F (°C)	47.2 (8.4)	48.0 (8.9)	50.7 (10.4)	53.4 (11.9)	57.9 (14.4)	61.1 (16.2)	65.0 (18.3)	65.6 (18.7)	63.5 (17.5)	58.2 (14.6)	51.4 (10.8)	46.7 (8.2)	55.7 (13.2)
Mean minimum °F (°C)	37.9 (3.3)	38.9 (3.8)	41.6 (5.3)	45.0 (7.2)	49.7 (9.8)	53.8 (12.1)	58.7 (14.8)	58.7 (14.8)	55.2 (12.9)	48.9 (9.4)	41.9 (5.5)	37.4 (3.0)	35.8 (2.1)
Record low °F (°C)	20 (−7)	28 (−2)	33 (1)	33 (1)	38 (3)	43 (6)	46 (8)	47 (8)	43 (6)	36 (2)	29 (−2)	27 (−3)	20 (−7)
Average precipitation inches (mm)	2.22 (56)	2.36 (60)	1.41 (36)	0.80 (20)	0.28 (7.1)	0.08 (2.0)	0.04 (1.0)	0.02 (0.51)	0.16 (4.1)	0.57 (14)	0.76 (19)	1.57 (40)	10.27 (259.71)
Average precipitation days (≥ 0.01 in)	6.1	6.1	4.8	2.8	1.7	0.7	0.5	0.3	0.7	2.1	3.1	4.7	33.6
Source 1: NOAA
Source 2: National Weather Service

== Demographics ==
Historical population
Census	Pop.	Note	%±
1900	330		—
1910	673		103.9%
1920	1,161		72.5%
1930	3,508		202.2%
1940	4,651		32.6%
1950	12,881		177.0%
1960	24,971		93.9%
1970	40,494		62.2%
1980	76,698		89.4%
1990	128,398		67.4%
2000	161,029		25.4%
2010	167,086		3.8%
2020	174,068		4.2%
2024 (est.)	171,483	▼	−1.5%
U.S. Decennial Census; 1860–1870 1880-1890; 1900 1910 1920; 1930 1940 1950; 1960 1970 1980; 1990 2000 2010; 2020

Oceanside city, California Top 3 Regional ethnic groups From the 2020 Census DHC-A Detailed Race Data
Race Group	Population	Percent
European	67,845	39.0%
Mexican	52,863	30.4%
Other White (incl. not specified)	46,960	27.0%

Oceanside city, California – Racial and ethnic composition Note: the US Census treats Hispanic/Latino as an ethnic category. This table excludes Latinos from the racial categories and assigns them to a separate category. Hispanics/Latinos may be of any race.
Race / Ethnicity (NH = Non-Hispanic)	Pop 2000	Pop 2010	Pop 2020	% 2000	% 2010	% 2020
White alone (NH)	86,310	80,849	78,444	53.60%	48.39%	45.07%
Black or African American alone (NH)	9,504	7,101	6,456	5.90%	4.25%	3.71%
Native American or Alaska Native alone (NH)	682	613	503	0.42%	0.37%	0.29%
Asian alone (NH)	8,623	10,638	12,759	5.35%	6.37%	7.33%
Native Hawaiian or Pacific Islander alone (NH)	1,917	1,999	1,886	1.19%	1.20%	1.08%
Other race alone (NH)	206	347	1,030	0.13%	0.21%	0.59%
Mixed race or Multiracial (NH)	5,096	5,592	9,674	3.16%	3.35%	5.56%
Hispanic or Latino (any race)	48,691	59,947	63,316	30.24%	35.88%	36.37%
Total	161,029	167,086	174,068	100.00%	100.00%	100.00%

=== 2020 ===
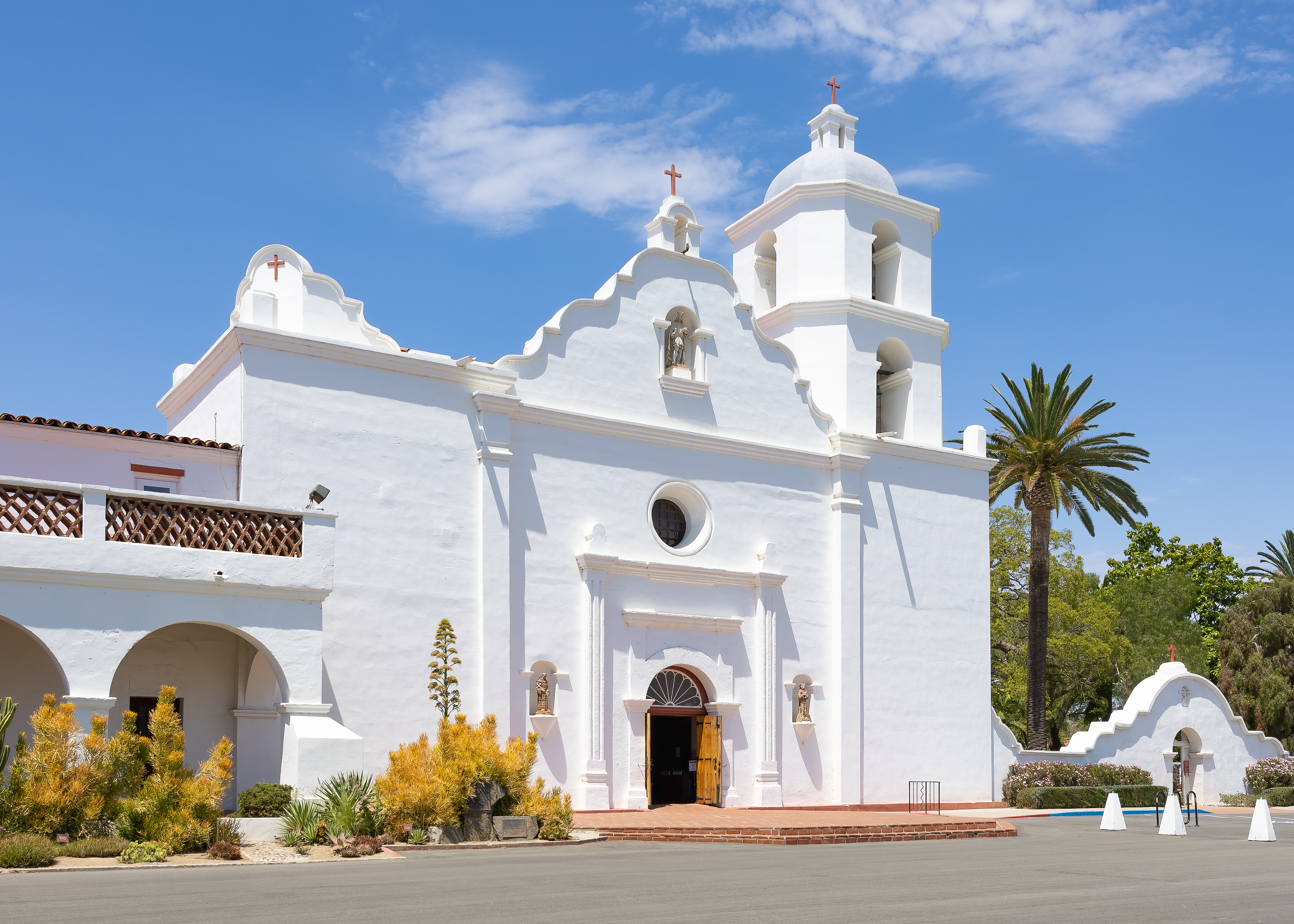
The church at Mission San Luis Rey de Francia is a parish of the Roman Catholic Diocese of San Diego.

The 2020 United States census reported that Oceanside had a population of 174,068. The population density was 4,217.8 inhabitants per square mile (1,628.5/km^{2}). The racial makeup of Oceanside was 51.5% White, 4.1% African American, 1.4% Native American, 7.6% Asian, 1.2% Pacific Islander, 18.0% from other races, and 16.2% from two or more races. Hispanic or Latino of any race were 36.4% of the population.

The census reported that 99.1% of the population lived in households, 0.7% lived in non-institutionalized group quarters, and 0.2% were institutionalized.

There were 63,032 households, out of which 29.8% included children under the age of 18, 49.4% were married-couple households, 7.0% were cohabiting couple households, 26.5% had a female householder with no partner present, and 17.2% had a male householder with no partner present. 23.2% of households were one person, and 11.3% were one person aged 65 or older. The average household size was 2.74. There were 43,053 families (68.3% of all households).

The age distribution was 20.0% under the age of 18, 9.3% aged 18 to 24, 27.6% aged 25 to 44, 25.5% aged 45 to 64, and 17.6% who were 65 years of age or older. The median age was 39.3 years. For every 100 females, there were 95.8 males.

There were 67,371 housing units at an average density of 1,632.4 units per square mile (630.3 units/km^{2}), of which 63,032 (93.6%) were occupied. Of these, 58.6% were owner-occupied, and 41.4% were occupied by renters.

In 2023, the US Census Bureau estimated that the median household income was $93,724, and the per capita income was $43,094. About 4.5% of families and 8.1% of the population were below the poverty line.

=== 2010 ===
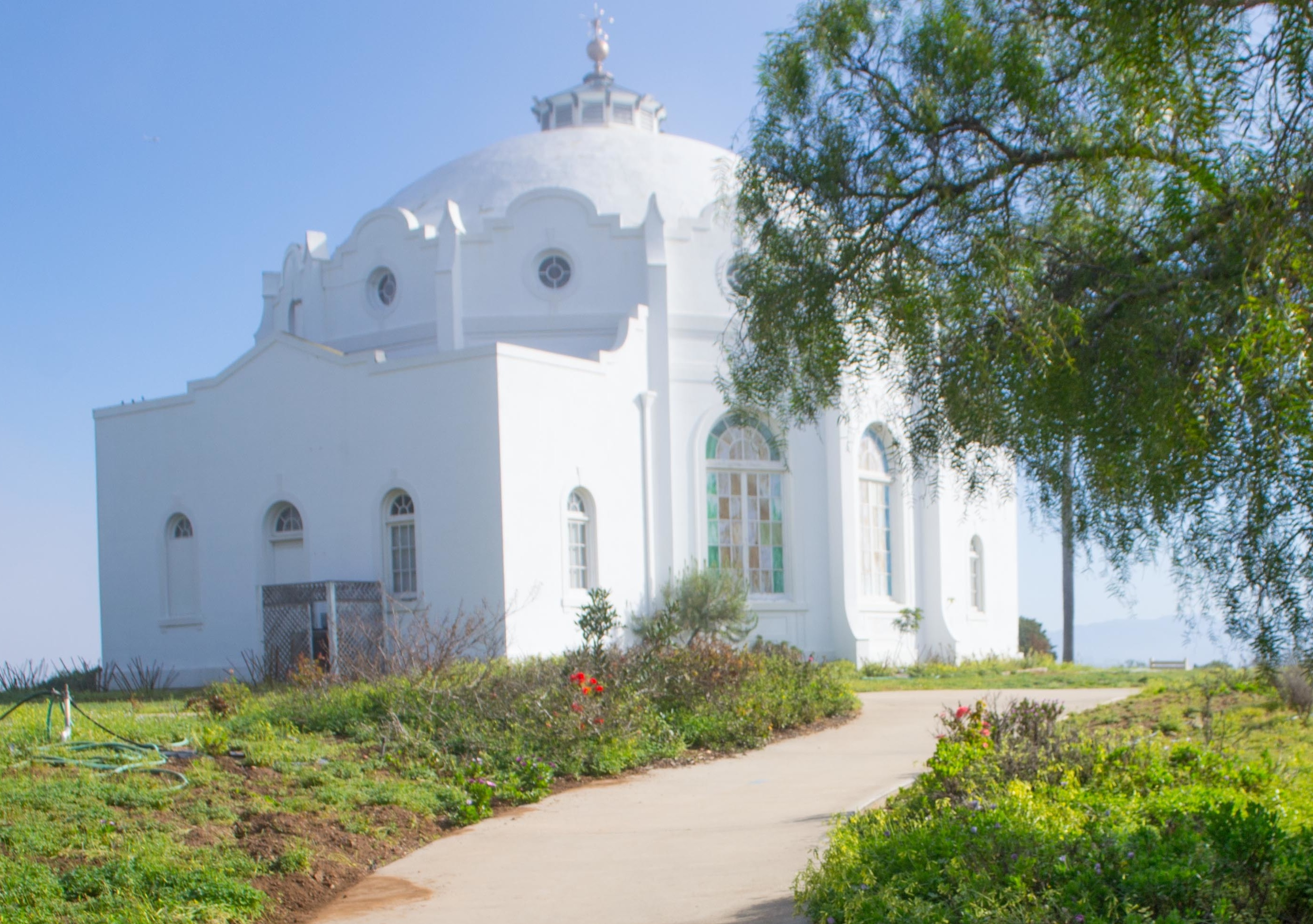
Mount Ecclesia is the headquarters of the Rosicrucian Fellowship.

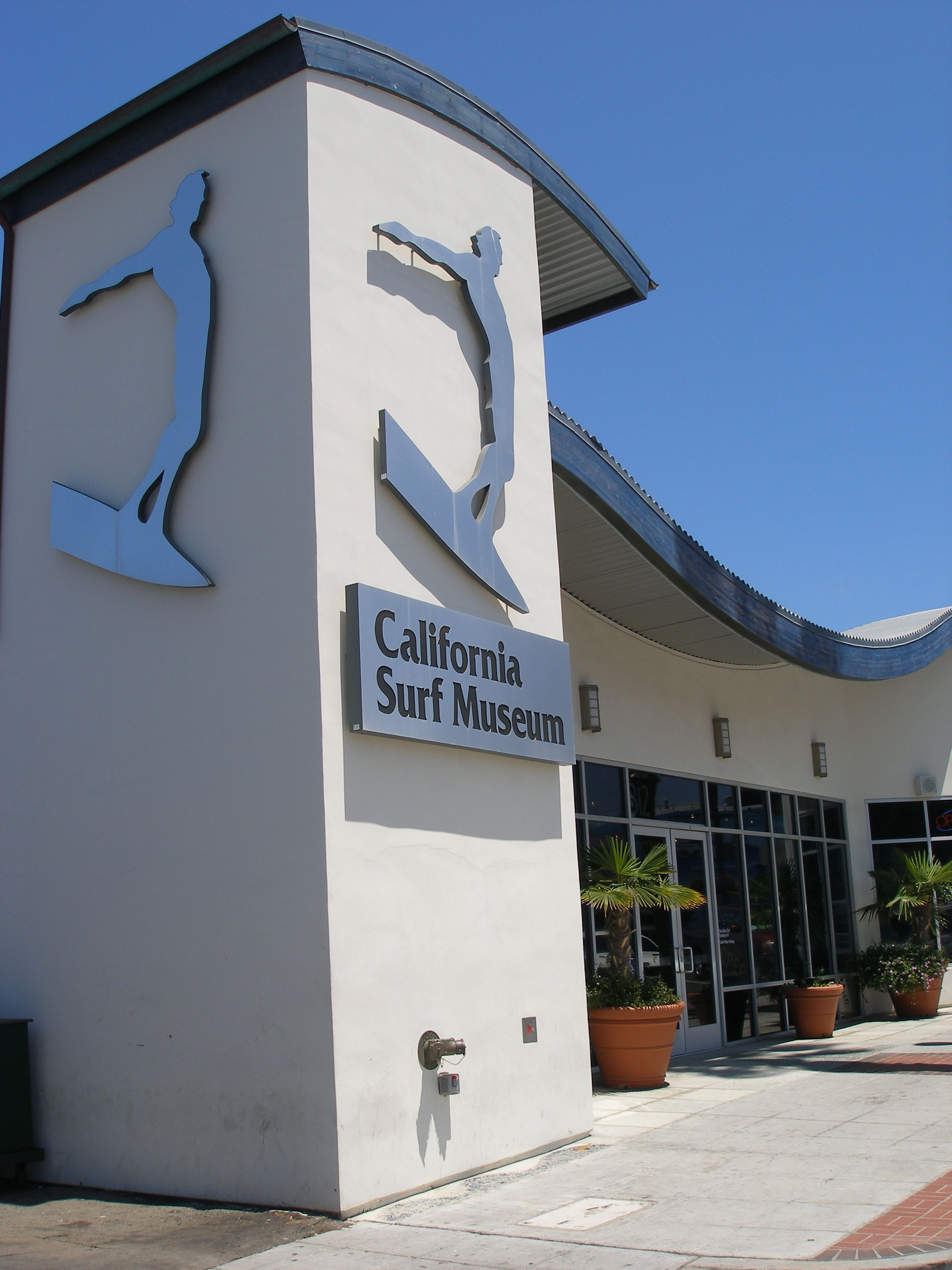
California Surf Museum

The 2010 United States census reported that Oceanside had a population of 167,086. The population density was 3,961.8 inhabitants per square mile (1,529.7/km^{2}). The racial makeup of Oceanside was 109,020 (65.2%) White, 7,873 (4.7%) African American, 1,385 (0.8%) Native American, 11,081 (6.6%) Asian (3.4% Filipino, 0.7% Japanese, 0.7% Vietnamese, 0.6% Chinese, 0.4% Korean, 0.2% Indian), 2,144 (1.3%) Pacific Islander, 25,886 (15.5%) from other races, and 9,697 (5.8%) from two or more races. Hispanic or Latino of any race were 59,947 persons (35.9%).

The Census reported that 166,150 people (99.4% of the population) lived in households, 802 (0.5%) lived in non-institutionalized group quarters, and 134 (0.1%) were institutionalized.

There were 59,238 households, out of which 20,486 (34.6%) had children under the age of 18 living in them, 30,201 (51.0%) were opposite-sex married couples living together, 6,947 (11.7%) had a female householder with no husband present, 3,111 (5.3%) had a male householder with no wife present. There were 3,504 (5.9%) unmarried opposite-sex partnerships, and 472 (0.8%) same-sex married couples or partnerships. Of the households 14,117 (23.8%) were made up of individuals, and 6,161 (10.4%) had someone living alone who was 65 years of age or older. The average household size was 2.80. There were 40,259 families (68.0% of all households); the average family size was 3.32.

The population was spread out, with 39,817 people (23.8%) under the age of 18, 19,028 people (11.4%) aged 18 to 24, 45,797 people (27.4%) aged 25 to 44, 40,943 people (24.5%) aged 45 to 64, and 21,501 people (12.9%) who were 65 years of age or older. The median age was 35.2 years. For every 100 females, there were 97.4 males. For every 100 females age 18 and over, there were 95.0 males.

There were 64,435 housing units at an average density of 1,527.8 units per square mile (589.9 units/km^{2}), of which 34,986 (59.1%) were owner-occupied, and 24,252 (40.9%) were occupied by renters. The homeowner vacancy rate was 2.2%; the rental vacancy rate was 6.2%. Of the population 97,645 people (58.4%) lived in owner-occupied housing units and 68,505 people (41.0%) lived in rental housing units.

== Economy ==
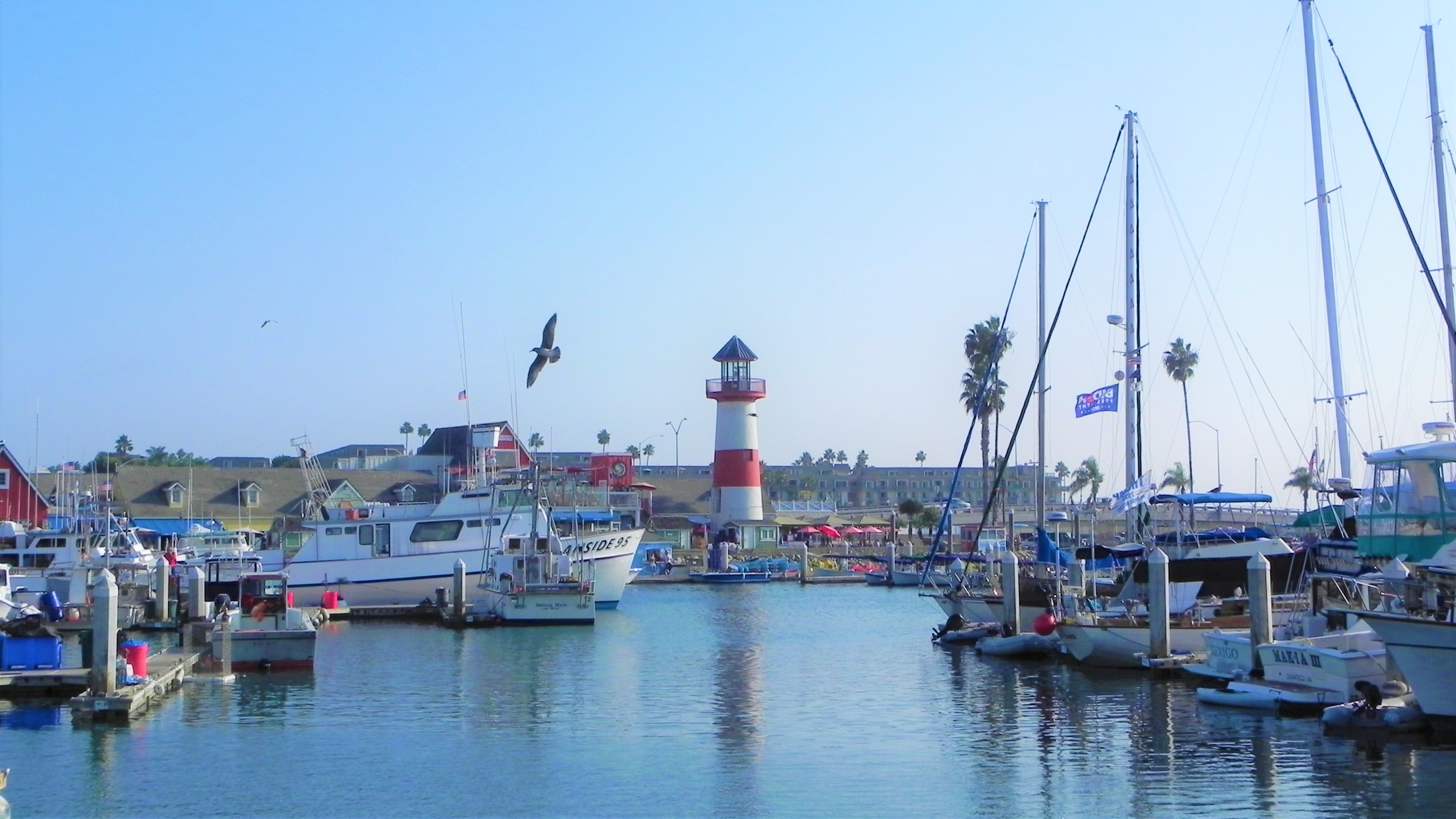
Oceanside Harbor Village

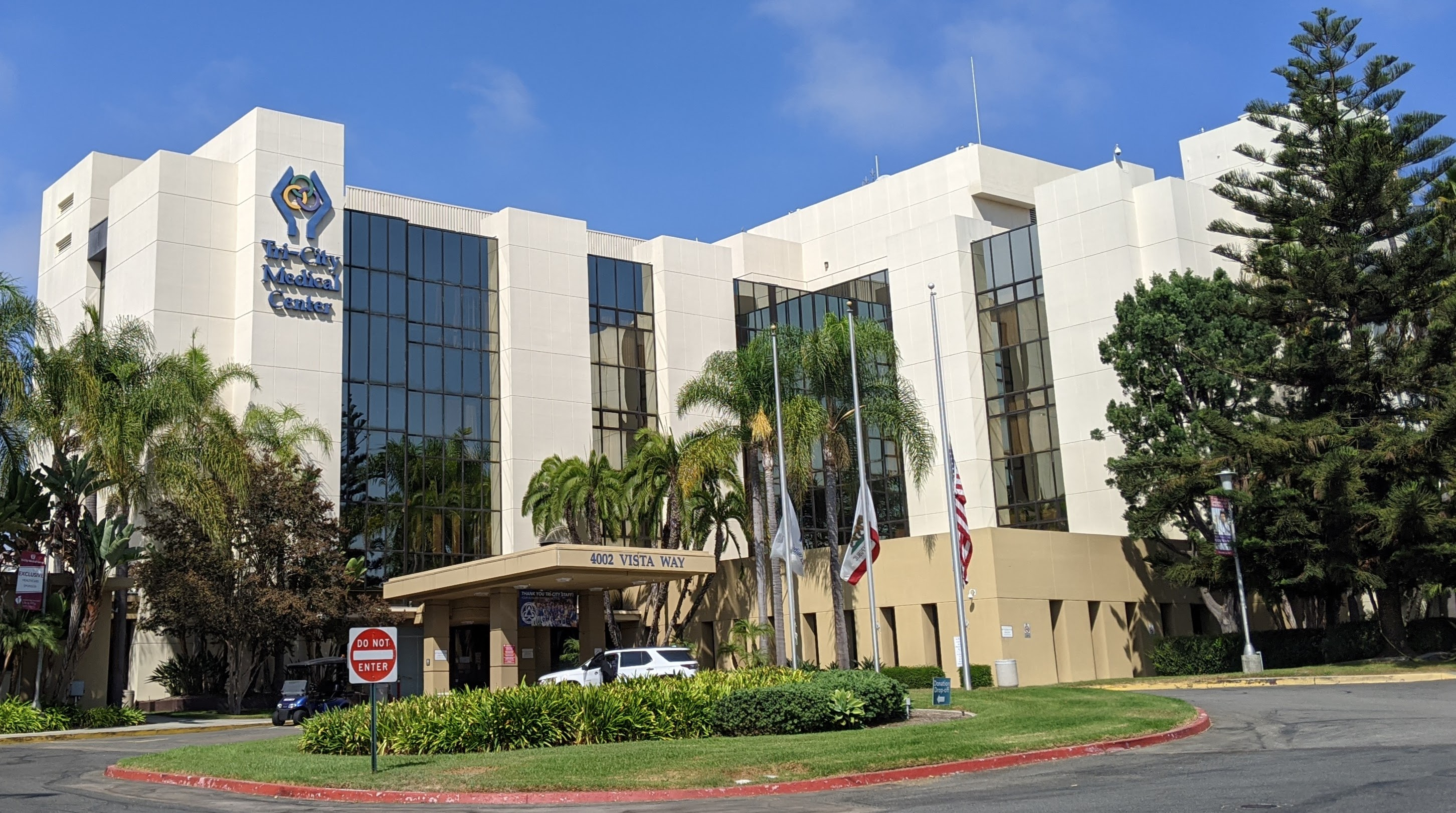
Tri-City Medical Center

According to the city's 2017 Comprehensive Annual Financial Report, the top employers in the city are:

#	Employer	# of Employees
1	Oceanside Unified School District	2,957
2	Tri-City Hospital District	2,423
3	Mira Costa College	1,605
4	City of Oceanside	1,029
5	West Coast Tomato Growers	751
6	North County Transit District	737
7	Genentech, Inc.	462
8	TE Connectivity	426
9	Hydranautics	358
10	Oceans Eleven Casino	344

== Government ==
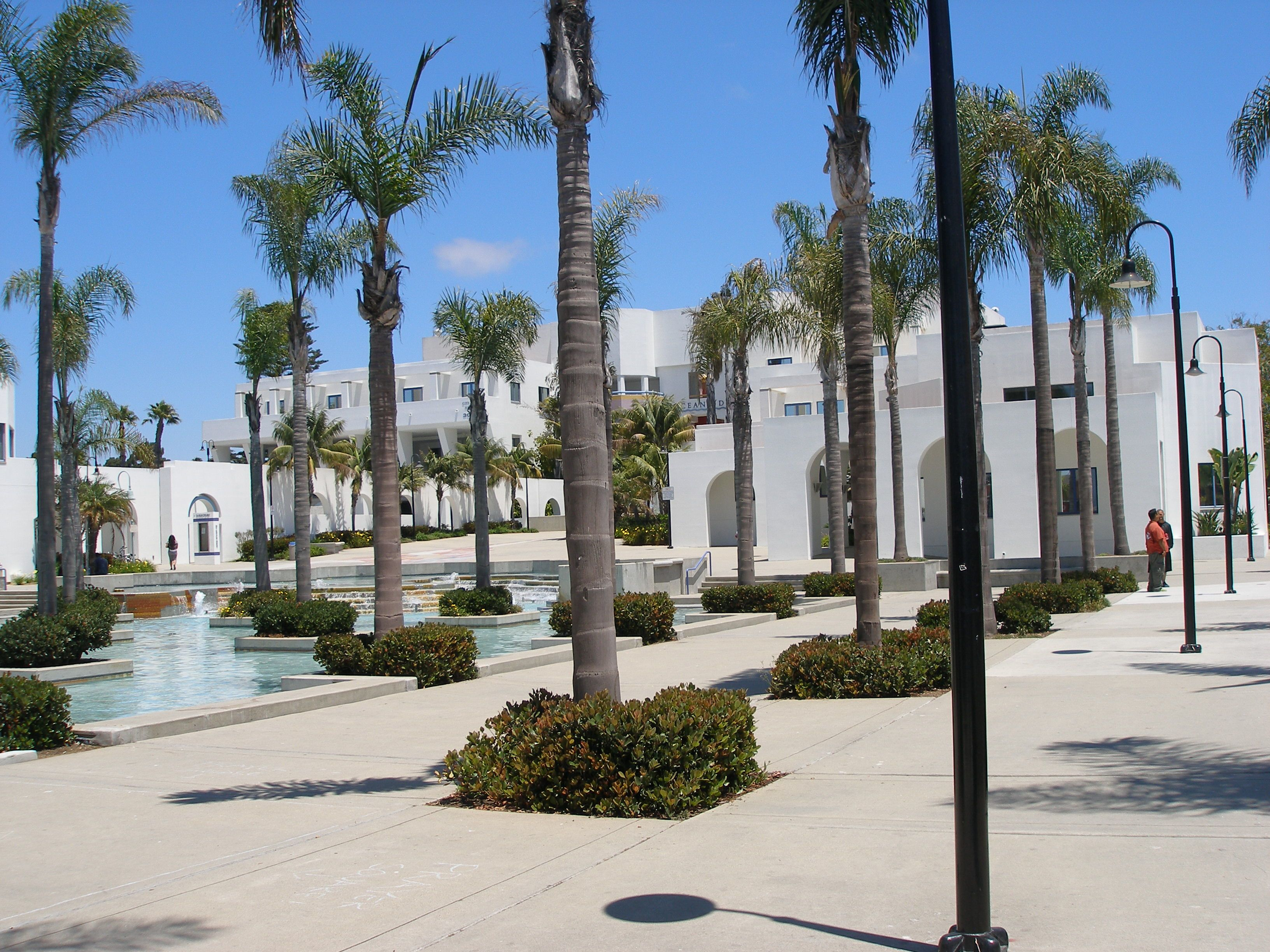
Oceanside Civic Center

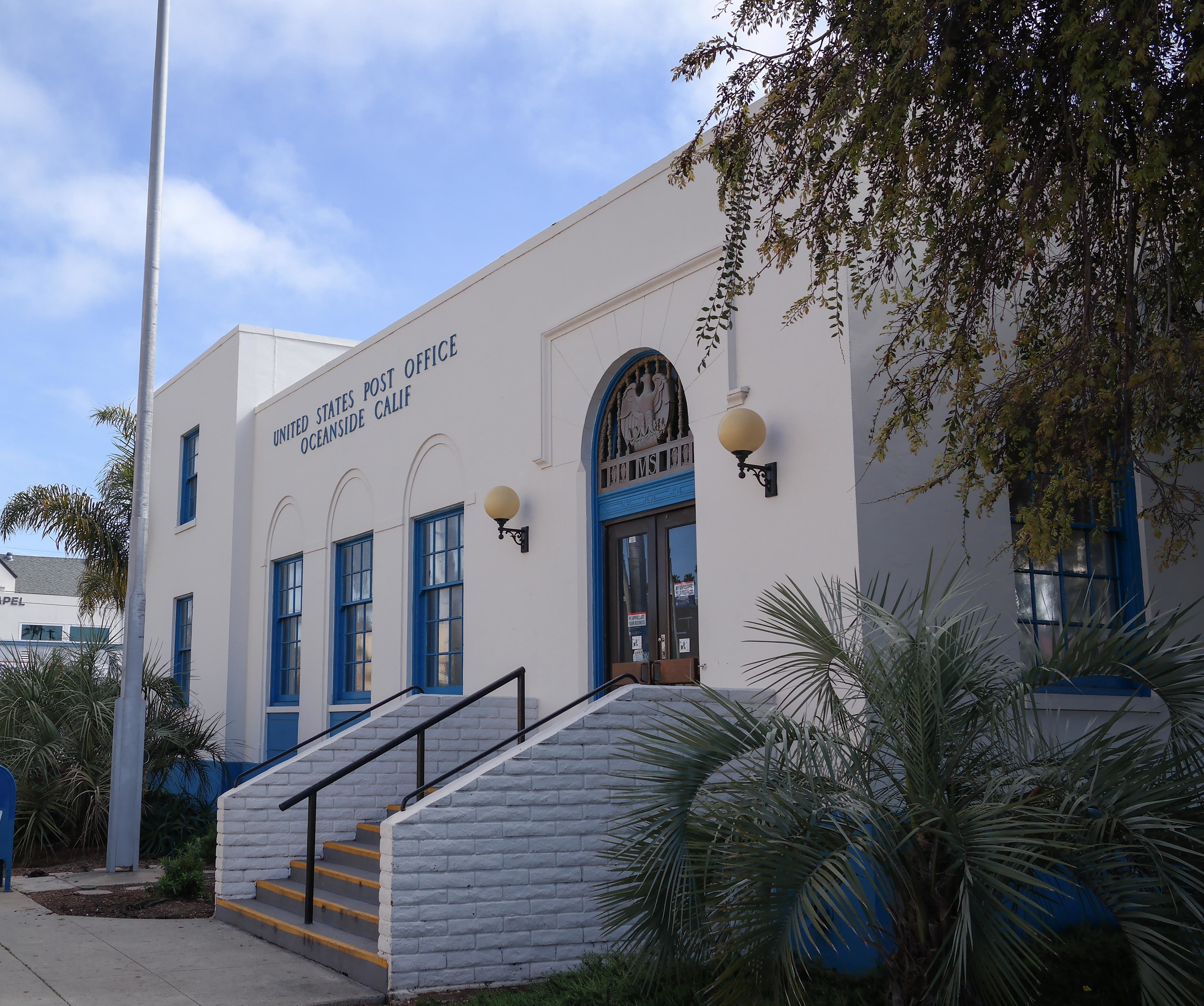
Oceanside Post Office

The city operates under the council-manager form of government. The city council consists of four members elected from districts and one mayor elected at large. The current council is composed of: Esther Sanchez (Mayor), Jimmy Figueroa (District 3), Peter Weiss (District 4), Eric Joyce (Deputy Mayor and District 1), and Rick Robinson (District 2).

The current city treasurer is Phyllis Dominguez. The current city clerk is Zeb Navarro.

The City of Oceanside is a full-service city. It provides police and fire safety, water and sewer services. The city has a municipal airport, a small craft harbor, one of the longest wooden piers in the west, golf courses, swimming pools, numerous parks, community centers, and extensive palm-lined beaches. Oceanside Public Library is the city's public library system, with the main branch located in the civic center.

=== State and federal representation ===
In the California State Legislature, Oceanside is in the 38th senatorial district, represented by Democrat Catherine Blakespear, and in the 74th Assembly district, represented by Republican Laurie Davies.

In the United States House of Representatives, Oceanside is in California's 49th congressional district, represented by Democrat Mike Levin.

== Arts and culture ==
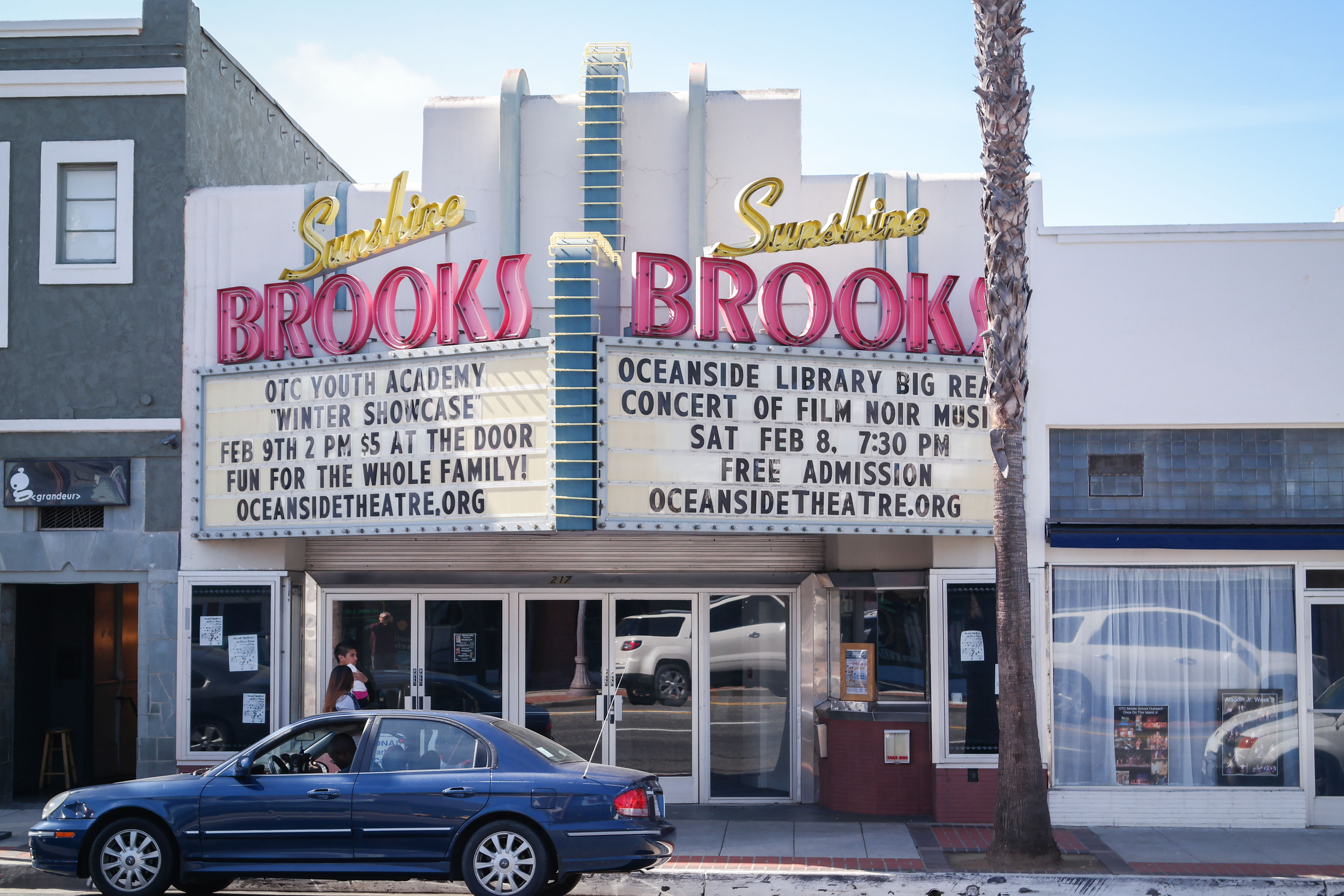
Sunshine Brooks Theatre

- The Oceanside Pier, first built in 1888 (and now in its sixth incarnation), is one of the longest wooden piers on the western United States coastline, at 1,942 feet (592 m).
- Oceanside Museum of Art is located in the cultural district section of downtown Oceanside.
- The historic district of Mount Ecclesia, home to the Rosicrucian Fellowship, is noted for its singular architecture and the preservation of nature grounds and gardens.
- Oceanside is one of the 14 designated cultural districts in California. This designation by the California Arts Council acknowledges the city's vibrant arts scene and its commitment to cultural enrichment. The Oceanside Cultural District encompasses a walkable area in the downtown center, boasting a concentration of museums and theaters, like the historic Star Theatre.
- The California Surf Museum is located in downtown Oceanside.
- Oceanside is home to the world's largest surf competition, the Super Girl Pro Festival, which has been held yearly since 2007.
- Each Thursday evening, downtown Oceanside hosts the Sunset Market, a gathering of local vendors, hot food and live entertainment.
- Founded in 2006, the Frontwave Credit Union O'side Turkey Trot hosts approximately 9,000 runners and walkers from 46 states and 8 countries and has been voted one of the top trots in the country several times.
- Since 2006, Oceanside has played host to the official start of the annual 3,000-mile (4,800 km) bicycle race, Race Across America, which is usually held during the second week of June.
- Oceanside has hosted the Beach Soccer Championships since 2007. The festival is the largest on the west coast and takes place the third weekend in May.
- The Oceanside International Film Festival was founded in 2009 by the Oceanside Cultural Arts Foundation.
- The house from the film Top Gun, commonly called the Top Gun House, is located near the pier. In 2019, the house was moved from its original site and extensively restored.
- Oceanside is home to a harbor which contains a lighthouse, several shops and restaurants, the Oceanside Sign, and hundreds of boats.
- The TV series Animal Kingdom, based on the 2010 film of the same name, is set and filmed in Oceanside.
- The 2023 Disney animated TV series Hailey's On It! is set on Oceanside.
- Frontwave Arena, a 7,500 seat multi-use arena, opened in 2024.

== Education ==
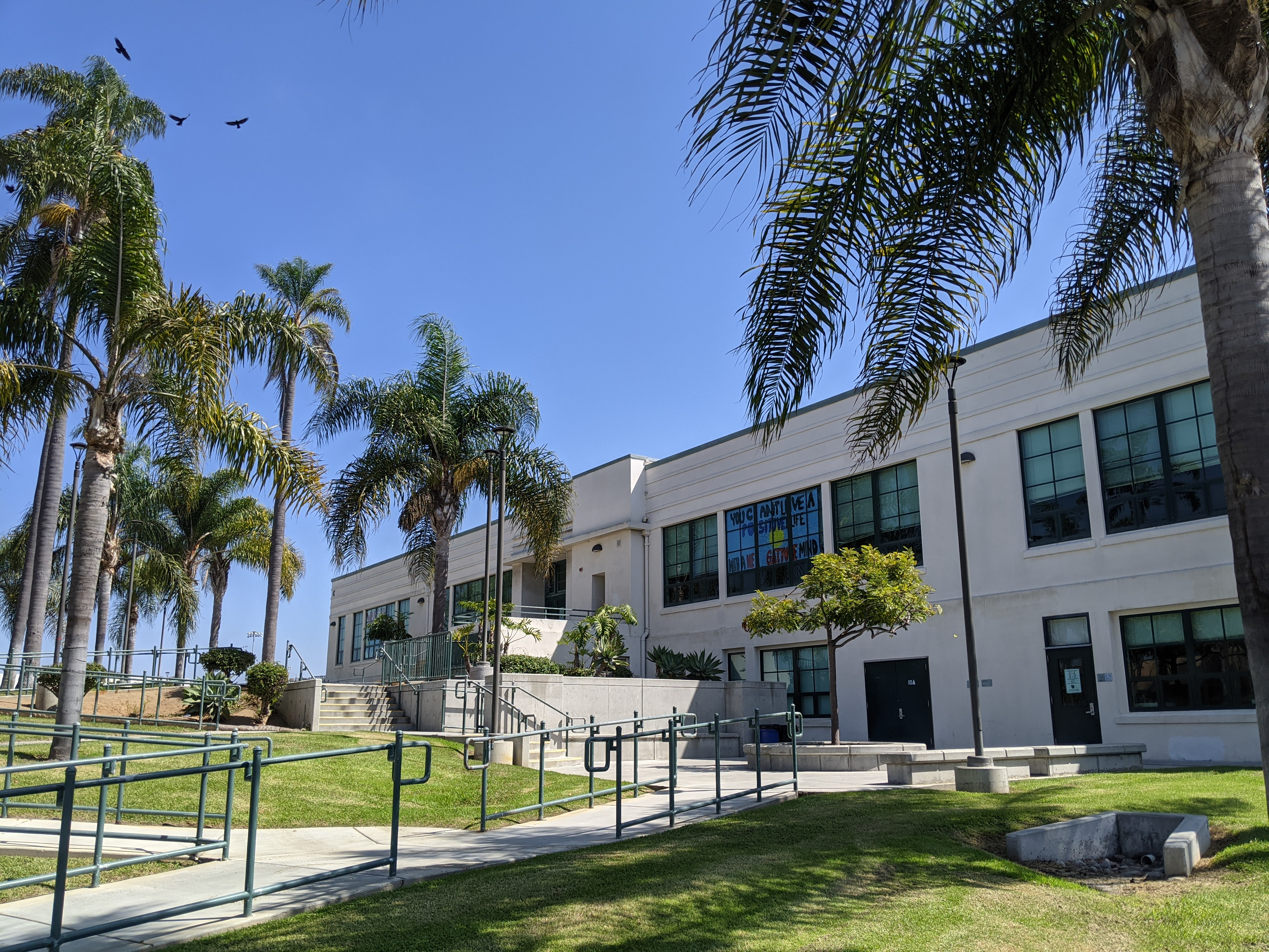
Oceanside High School

Most of Oceanside is in the Oceanside Unified School District, while some portions are in the Carlsbad Unified School District, the Bonsall Union School District, and the Vista Unified School District,. Some residents with Oceanside postal addresses that are outside of the city limits in the Fallbrook Union Elementary School District and the Fallbrook Union High School District. The Oceanside Unified School District provides instrumental music programs in grades 4–12.

The Oceanside Unified School District has two comprehensive high schools: El Camino High School and Oceanside High School. High school students are also served by Ocean Shores Continuation High School and Clair Burgener Academy. OUSD has 24 schools plus three charter schools, including the School of Business and Technology, and two brand new schools, Louise Foussat Elementary School and Cesar Chavez Middle School, that opened in the Fall of 2007.

The other school, Louise Foussat Elementary School, located on Pala Road, is built on 12.6 acres (5.1 ha) of land with 35 classrooms totaling 54,490 square feet (5,062 m^{2}) and can accommodate 800 students.

A free, independent public charter school, Scholarship Prep, is a new TK-8th grade school which was authorized to open in August 2017 and is sited at the historic San Luis Rey Mission. It offers a full educational experience for Oceanside students.

== Transportation ==
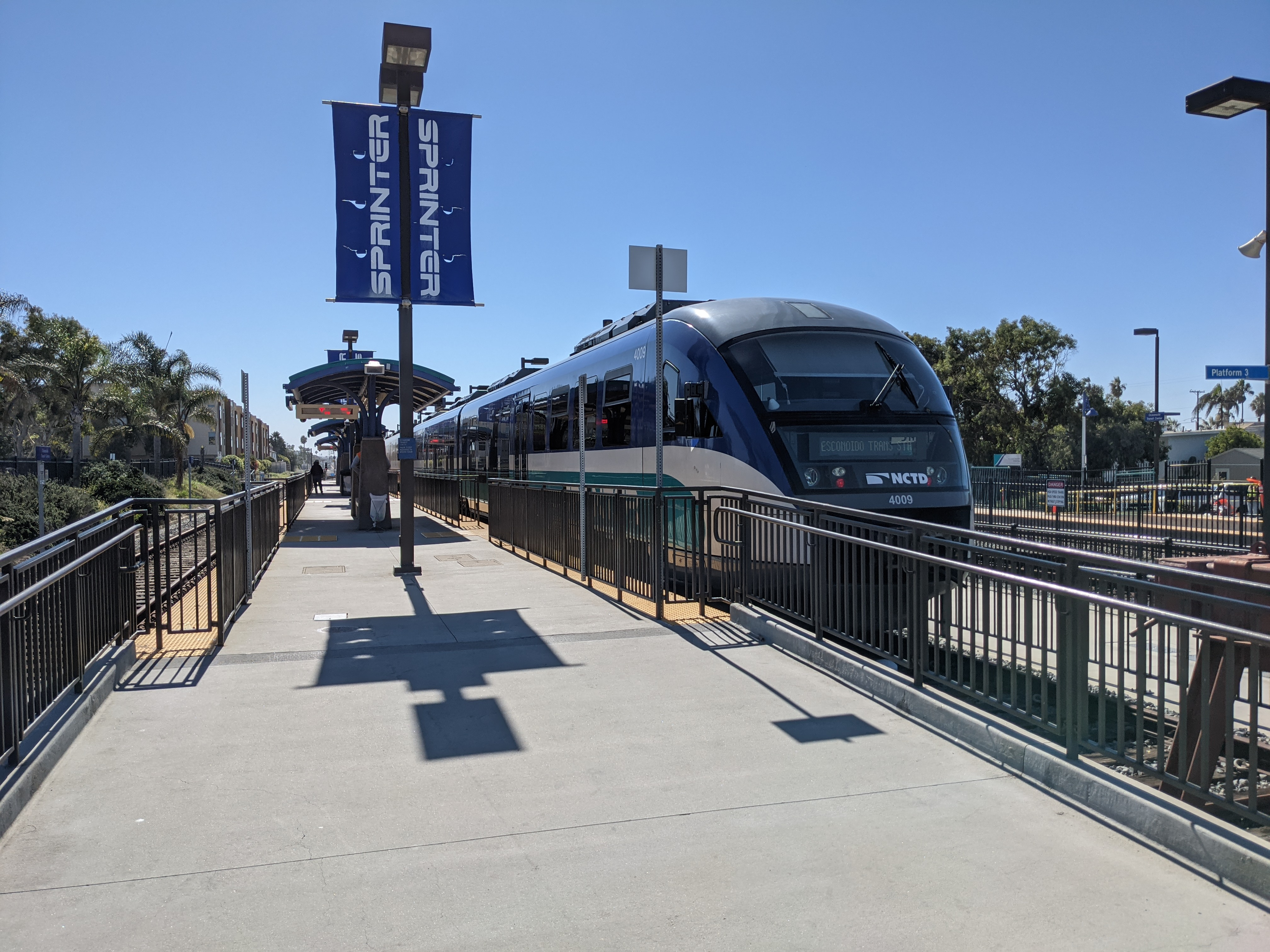
Sprinter train at Oceanside Transportation Center

=== Rail and air ===
The Oceanside Transit Center is a major railway interchange for long distance and commuter rail services. Amtrak's Pacific Surfliner provides service to San Luis Obispo via Los Angeles and San Diego. Metrolink's commuter rail service connects Oceanside to many parts of Greater Los Angeles, while Coaster commuter rail serves northern and central San Diego County. The Sprinter hybrid rail service connects Oceanside to Escondido.

Oceanside Municipal Airport (OCN) is mainly used as a general aviation field. The nearest international airport is San Diego International Airport, connected to Oceanside via Amtrak and Coaster rail services.

=== Interstate and highways ===
Interstate 5 (I-5) travels through Oceanside, connecting to California State Route 76 (SR 76) and California State Route 78 (SR 78) within the city.

== Sister cities ==
- Ensenada, Mexico
- Kisarazu, Japan
- Fuji, Japan
- Pago Pago, American Samoa
