= Camp Salvation =

Refugee camp along the Southern Emigrant Trail

- Map of the Gila Trail, the first part of the Southern Emigrant Trail
- Interactive map of Camp Salvation
- 32.670022222°N 115.49324166°W
- Location: City Hall of Calexico; Calexico, California, US

History
- Built: 1849
- Demolished: 1849

California Historical Landmark
- Official name: Camp Salvation
- Designated: October 5, 1965
- Reference no.: 944

Camp Salvation was a refugee camp set up on September 23, 1849, to help those traveling to the California Gold Rush. Emigrants were crossing the harsh Sonoran Desert to get to California through the Southern Emigrant Trail. The camp was located in the current town of Calexico, California. Lieutenant Cave Johnson Couts, an Escort Commander with the International Boundary Commission set up the camp. From September 23 till December 1, 1849, the camp helped travelers on the trail. In June 1849 the United States Boundary Commission arrived in San Diego to survey the international border between United States and Mexico, which led to the creation of the Camp.

== California Historical Landmark ==
A California Historical Marker was set up in 1965 by the California State Park Commission working with City of Calexico and the John P. Squibob with E Clampus Vitus. The marker is at the 400 Block of East 5th Street, Calexico. The California Historical Landmark number 808.

The California Historical Landmark reads:

Marker Number 808, Here on September 23, 1849, Liet. Cave J. Couts, Escourt Commander, International Boundary Commission, established Camp Salvation. From September till the first of December 1849, it served as a refugee center for distressed emigrants attempting to reach the gold fields over the Southern Emigrant Trail.

== Lieutenant Cave J. Couts ==
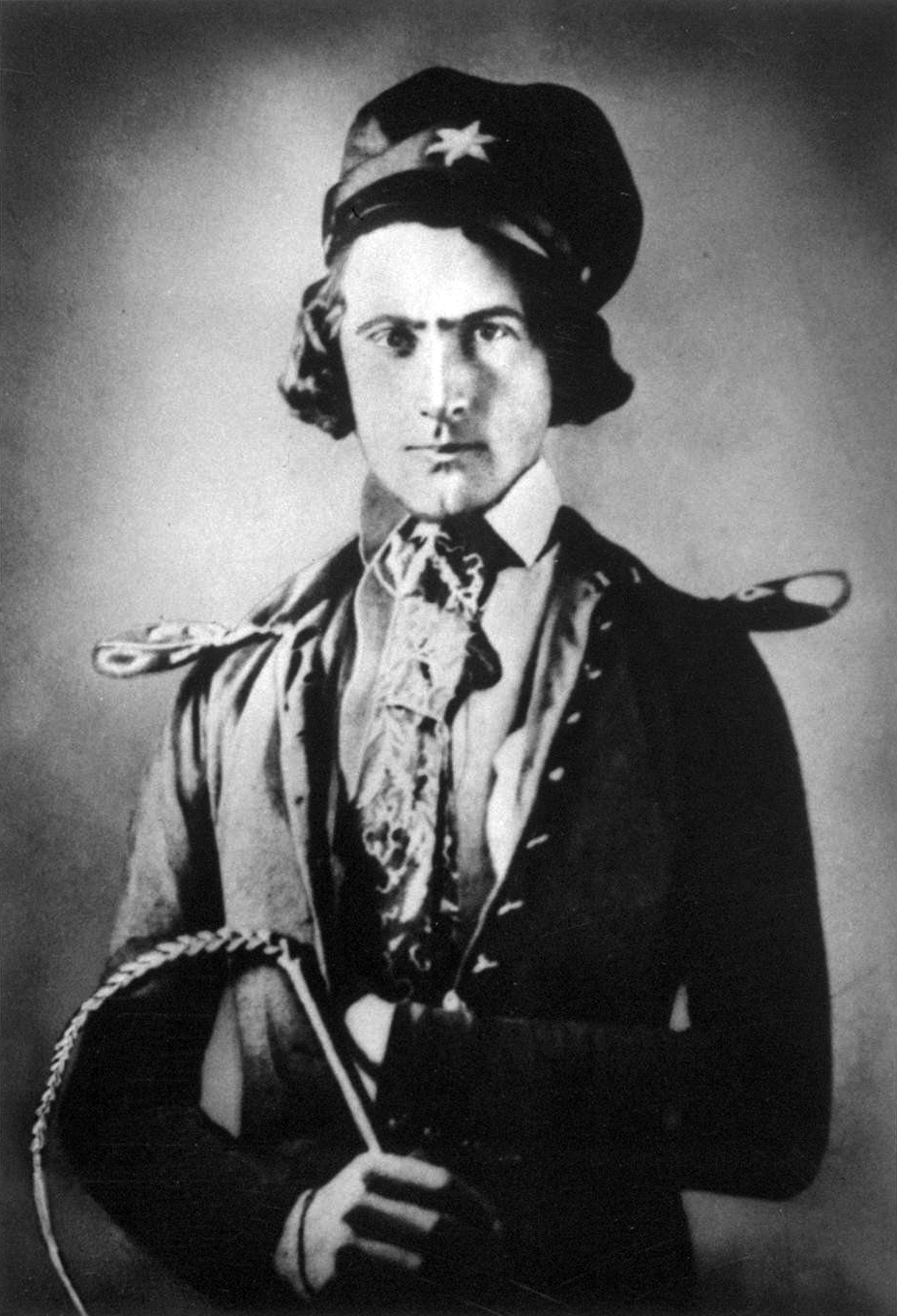
Lieutenant Cave J. Couts in 1843

Cave Johnson Couts was born on November 11, 1821, in Springfield, Tennessee. Much of his education came from his uncle Cave Johnson, who served as a U.S. Congressman from Tennessee and the United States Postmaster General. The younger Couts himself became a cadet in West Point Military Academy at 17. He graduated in 1843 and became a second lieutenant of the regiment of Mounted Rifles. He was sent to Fort Jesup in Natchitoches, Louisiana. Then posted to Fort Washita in Durant, Oklahoma, called the in Indian Territory then. Then to Fort Gibson departing in 1847. In 1848 he and his men depart to California, arriving on January 9, 1849. The trip across the Sonoran Desert and was very difficult. Couts was the leader of an expedition to the Gila River and was in charge of the Boundary Survey between the United States and Mexico in 1849. Couts set up a post camp at the meeting spot of the Colorado and Gila Rivers. He called the post Camp Calhoun. Along with boundary survey work, he helped with Indian relations and helped '49er emigrants.

He was elected as state delegate from San Diego on August 1, 1849, to attend California Constitutional Convention at Monterey in 1849. He set up a refugee camp at the current site of Calexico, California on September 23, 1849, to help those traveling to the California Gold Rush. Couts married Miss Ysidora Bandini (1829-1897) on April 5, 1851. Ysidora was the daughter of Don Juan Bandini of San Diego. Bandini had worked for the Mexican government and was the son of Don Jose Bandini, an admiral in the Spanish Navy. Couts had 10 children. Couts lived on a 2,219 acres Ranch Guajome, near present-day Vista, California. In October 1851 Couts resigned his Army commission and then took an appointed a Colonel in the aide de camp of Governor John Bigler. At his Ranch Guajome he found that San Diego County soil and climate could grow many types of agriculture crops. Couts was the first in San Diego County to plant vast orchards. After retiring from the Army he lived in old San Diego and became a County Judge. On August 10, 1856, Couts became a special Indian agent for a short time. He checked up on the Indians in San Diego County and wrote of a report on their status to the Honorable Commissioner of Indian Affairs, with suggestions for improvement. At Mission San Luis Rey de Francia area, and Rancho Monserate he became the supervisor of the Indians there. He gave three hundred Indians jobs in construction, building: adobe house, chapel, barns, stables, sheds, corrals and planting flowers, orange and lemon trees. Couts' ranch did very well and he purchased near by ranches of Rancho Vallecitos de San Marcos in 1866, Rancho Buena Vista in 1866 and La Jolla. At its peak his ranch was 20,000 acres. He lost much with the passage of the no fence law of 1874. He had to sell much of his livestock at a sacrifice. He died on July 10, 1874, at the home of the Horton's House in San Diego.

The Couts home Rancho Guajome Adobe has been saved and is now a California Historical Landmark and on the National Register of Historic Places. It is located on the Guajome Regional Park in Vista California.

== See also ==
- California Historical Landmarks in Imperial County
- Yuma War - US battles
- Imperial County
- Imperial Valley
- Calexico–Mexicali
