= Ávila family of California =

Influential early settlers

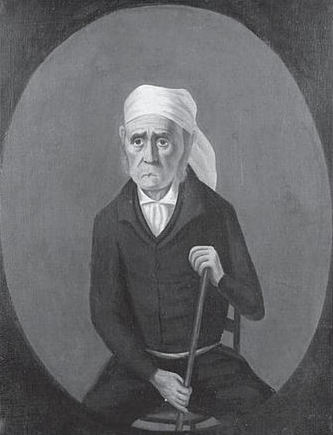
Antonio Ygnacio Ávila, of the Ávila family of California, was granted Rancho Sausal Redondo in 1837.

The Ávila family was a prominent Californio family of Spanish origins from Southern California, founded by Cornelio Ávila in the 1780s. Numerous members of the family held important rancho grants and political positions, including two Alcaldes of Los Angeles.

== Cornelio Ávila ==
Cornelio Ávila (1745–1800) was born at El Fuerte del Marqués de Montesclaros in New Navarre, New Spain (today's El Fuerte, Sinaloa, Mexico). When Antonio Cornelio Ávila was born about 1745, his father, Wilibardo Avila, was 55 and his mother, Olga Lidia Ruíz Maldonado, was 20.

Cornelio was a Spanish soldier who served in Alta California, then stayed to settle in the two-year-old Pueblo de Nuestra Señora Reina de los Ángeles sobre el Río Porciúncula in 1783 with his wife María Ysabel Urquídez (1750–1801) and 6 children: José de Santa Ana Ávila y Urquídez (1770–1806), Francisco José Ávila (1772–1832), Agustina Ávila (born 1775), Anastasio Ávila (born 1776), Antonio Ignacio Ávila (1781–1858), Ildefonsa Ávila (born 1782).

After settling in Los Angeles, three Californio children were born: Bruno Ygnacio Ávila (1788–1861), María Hilaria Ávila (born 1789), and José María Ávila (1790–1831). Cornelio Ávila died while visiting Santa Barbara in 1800, and was buried at the Presidio Cemetery.

== José de Santa Ana Ávila ==
José de Santa Ana Ávila y Urquídez (1770–1806), was born in Pueblo De Baca, in the Viceroyalty of New Spain (nowadays Mexico), one of several sons of Cornelio Ávila. José de Santa Ana married María Josefa Osuna y Alvarado in 1792. He was also a Spanish soldier at Santa Barbara 1801–1806.

=== Miguel Ávila ===
Miguel Ávila (1796–1874) was a Californio son of José de Santa Ana Ávila, born in Los Angeles. In 1816 he enlisted in the Presidio Real de Monterey company, and in 1824 was corporal of the guard at La Misión de San Luis Obispo de Tolosa. In 1826 he married María Innocenta Pico (born 1810), daughter of José Dolores Pico. Miguel Ávila was the grantee of Rancho San Miguelito (which includes present-day Ávila Beach) in 1842, and alcalde of San Luis Obispo in 1849.

=== María Ignacia Marcia Ávila ===
María Ignacia Marcia Ávila (1793–1858) was a daughter of José de Santa Ana Ávila y Urquídez and María Josefa Osuna y Alvarado. She married José Dolores Sepúlveda of Rancho de los Palos Verdes in 1813. After his death she married José Antonio Machado of Rancho La Ballona.

== Francisco Ávila ==
Francisco Ávila (1772–1832) was a wealthy ranchero and alcalde (mayor) of the pueblo of Los Angeles 1810–1811. Ávila was a Spaniard native of El Fuerte, New Spain (present-day Sinaloa, Mexico), which at the time was part of Spain. He was one of several sons of Cornelio Ávila and his wife. Francisco came to Los Angeles sometime after 1794. In 1810, Francisco Ávila became alcalde of the pueblo of Los Angeles. The pueblo's population at the time grew to 415 inhabitants.

In 1823, the Mexican government granted him 4,439 acres (17.96 km^{2}) of land Rancho Las Ciénegas, near the La Brea Pits, approximately seven miles west of the pueblo. Ávila grazed cattle here and turned it into a profitable venture. The Ávila land grant was bordered on three sides by four other ranchos (Rancho La Brea, Rancho La Ciénega o Paso de la Tijera, Rancho Rodeo de las Aguas and Rancho Rincon de los Bueyes). In later years Ávila and the other owners had many boundary disputes. The Avila Adobe built in 1818 by Francisco Ávila, still stands today in the heart of historic Olvera Street.

In November 1826, Ávila was one of the local notables invited to La Misión del Santo Príncipe El Arcángel, San Gabriel de Los Temblores by Father José Bernardo Sánchez to meet American explorer Jedediah Smith, the first to travel overland to California from the United States.

Francisco Ávila married María del Rosario Verdugo (1793–1822) in 1810; she was the daughter of Mariano Verdugo and María Gregoria Espinosa. After María del Rosario Ávila died in 1822, Francisco married María Encarnación Sepúlveda, the daughter of Francisco Sepúlveda, owner of Rancho San Vicente y Santa Mónica, and his wife.

Francisco Ávila died on April 5, 1832. His four children (Januario Ávila, Pedra Ávila de Ramírez, Francisca Ávila de Rimpau, and Louisa Ávila de Garfias) were granted the patent to Rancho Las Ciénegas in 1871.

== Antonio Ygnacio Ávila ==
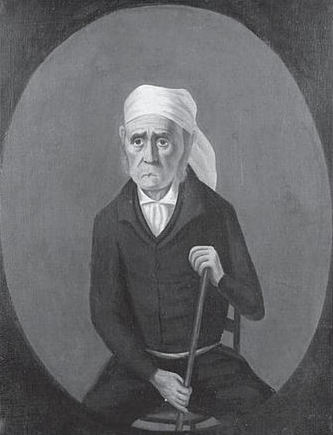
Antonio Ygnacio Ávila was granted Rancho Sausal Redondo in 1837.

Antonio Ygnacio Ávila (1781–1858) was another of the several sons of Cornelio Ávila and his wife. He married Rosa María Ruiz (1789–1866) in 1804. He was the grantee of the 22,458-acre (90.88 km^{2}) Rancho Sausal Redondo.

=== Ascensión Ávila ===
María Ascensión Ávila (born 1811), daughter of Antonio Ygnacio Ávila and his wife, married Pedro Antonio José Sánchez (born 1806). They had six children together, one of whom was Tomás Ávila Sánchez. After the death of her husband, Ascensión lived with Pío Pico, and had two daughters by him, Griselda and Joaquina.

=== Juan Ávila ===
Juan Ávila (1812–1889), son of Antonio Ygnacio Ávila, was the grantee of Rancho Niguel in 1842. He married María Soledad Tomasa Capistrano Yorba. He was a "judge of the plains" at Los Angeles in 1844, and justice of the peace at San Juan Capistrano in 1846.

=== Rafaela Ávila ===
Rafaela Ávila (born 1818) married in 1843 Emigdio Véjar (1810–1863), grantee of Rancho Boca de la Playa.

== Bruno Ygnacio Ávila ==
Bruno Ygnacio Ávila (1788–1861) was one of several sons of Cornelio Ávila. Bruno Ávila regained for his family Rancho Aguaje de la Centinela from Ygnacio Machado in 1845 through an exchange of property. Bruno Ávila, owned a modest adobe town house near present-day 7th and Alameda Streets in the pueblo of Los Angeles. It was a three-room structure on a small tract of land with a fenced-in vineyard. Machado traded his entire rancho, including the adobe hacienda, for Bruno Ávila's pueblo property. Bruno Ávila moved into the Centinela adobe and went into the business of raising cattle on the land, which was adjacent to his brother's Rancho Sausal Redondo. Within ten years, Bruno accumulated several thousand head of cattle. In 1854 he borrowed $400 from John G. Downey and agreed to pay six- percent interest per month, or seventy-two percent per year, which was the standard lending rate at the time for private loans. The following year he borrowed $1400 from Hillard P. Dorsey at a similar interest rate. Ávila, who put up Rancho La Centinela for collateral, was unable to repay the loans and subsequently lost his rancho in 1857. The land was seized and auctioned off at a Sheriff's sale.

== Anastasio Ávila ==
Anastasio Ávila (born 1776) was one of several sons of Cornelio Ávila. He was alcalde of Los Angeles in 1819–1821. In 1843, he was the grantee of the 3,559-acre (14.40 km^{2}) Rancho La Tajauta.

=== Enrique Ávila ===
Enrique Ávila, son of Anastasio Ávila, was 2nd alcalde of Los Angeles in 1847. Enrique Ávila served on the Los Angeles County Board of Supervisors for two terms 1868–1872.

== José María Ávila ==
José María Ávila (1790–1831) was one of several sons of Cornelio Ávila. He was alcalde of Los Angeles in 1825. He was first married at Misión San Diego de Alcalá to María Andrea Ygnacia Yorba, daughter of José Antonio Yorba and María Josefa Grijalva who was the daughter of Juan Pablo Grijalva, a Spanish soldier who traveled to Alta California with the expedition led by Juan Bautista de Anza and was the original petitioner for the lands that became known as the Rancho Santiago de Santa Ana. María died barely one year later, they had one son José María Ávila II. He secondly married Josefina Palomares, daughter of Ygnacio Palomares, they had one daughter. He was one of the leaders of the revolt against Governor Manuel Victoria in 1831. He and fifty other Los Angeles leaders were imprisoned by Alcalde Vicente Sánchez for plotting against Victoria. An army of 150 men raised at El Presidio Real de San Diego by José Antonio Carrillo and Pío Pico marched into the pueblo and released all prisoners. Victoria led a force from Monterey to stop the insurrection in Los Angeles. The two armies clashed at the Battle of Cahuenga Pass and José María Ávila was killed. Josefina Palomares then married Luis Arenas, who also had a son. They had four children of their own.

== See also ==
- List of Californios people
