= Cave Johnson Couts =

U.S. rancher and judge (1821–1874)

Colonel Cave Johnson Couts
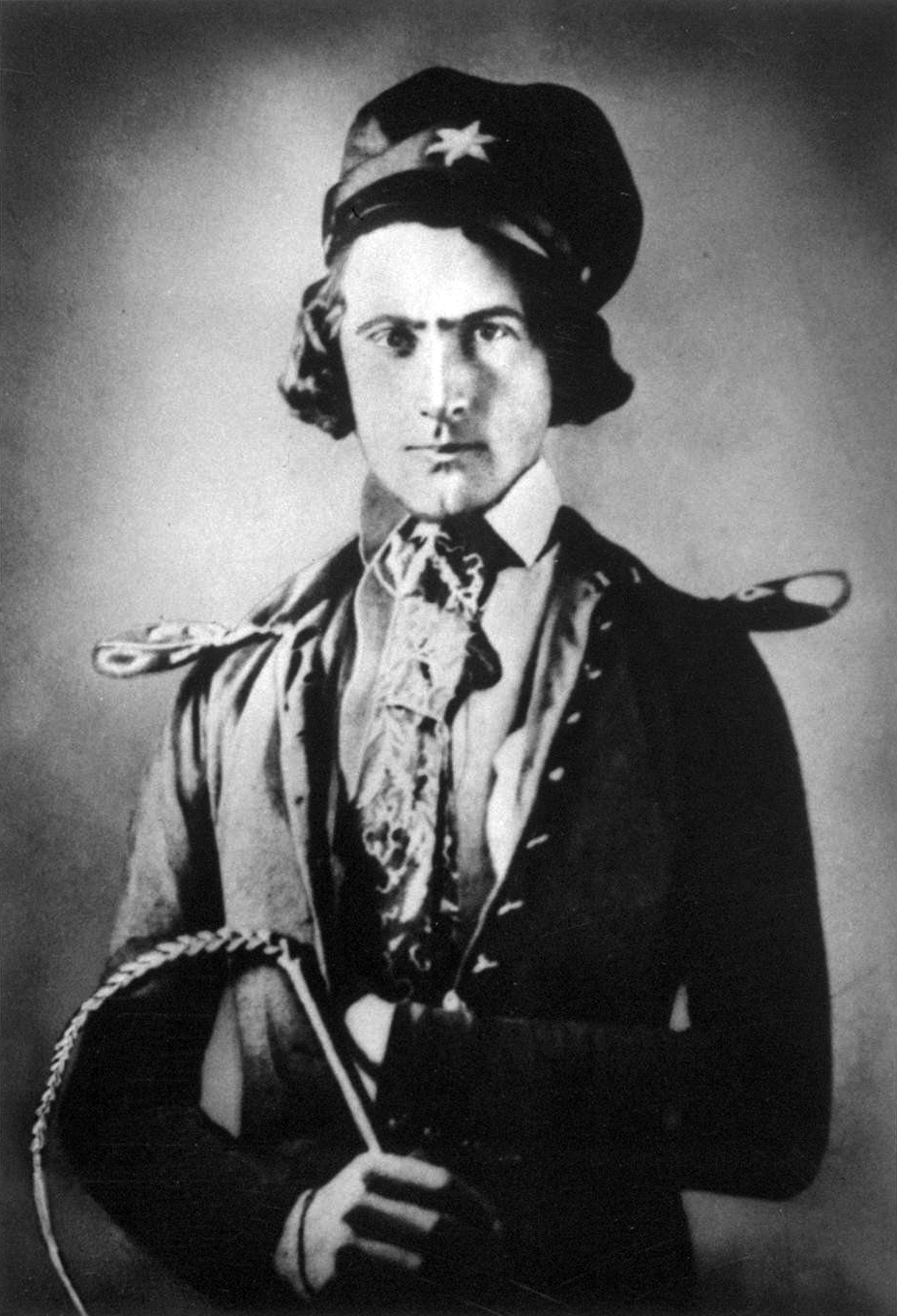
- Couts in 1843 as a Dragoon lieutenant
- Born: November 11, 1821; Springfield, Tennessee, U.S.
- Died: July 10, 1874 (aged 52); San Diego, California, U.S.
- Burial place: Pioneer Park (San Diego); 32.7492°N 117.1776°W
- Education: West Point
- Spouse: Ysidora Bandini
- Children: 10
- Military career
- Allegiance: United States
- Branch: US Army
- Service years: 1843–1851
- Rank: Colonel
- Units: Mounted Rifles; 3rd Cavalry Regiment
- Known for: California Gold Rush, Boundary Survey
- Other work: Military officer; Rancher; Judge; Politician
- Pronunciation: "cow-ts"
- Monuments: Camp Salvation
- Known for: Settling and ranching in Early California; Historical accounts
- Height: 6 ft 0 in (183 cm)
- Criminal charges: Acquitted of murder and other charges (various incidents)
- Relatives: Cave Johnson (uncle)

Judges of the Plains, San Diego County
- In office 1851 – -
- Appointed by: John Bigler

Justice of the Peace, San Diego
- In office 1853–1863

U.S. Indian Subagent
- In office 1853–1856
- Appointed by: Edward Fitzgerald Beale

Special Indian agent, San Diego County
- In office August 10, 1856 – —

Cave "Don Cuevas" Johnson Couts (November 11, 1821 – July 10, 1874) was an American military officer, rancher, and judge. After a commission to San Diego County, California, in 1849 amid the California Gold Rush, he wrote meticulous records, became a prominent political figure, and developed agricultural practices, including founding Rancho Guajome. Couts served as a county judge and briefly as a special Indian agent in 1856.

== Early life and education ==
Couts was born on November 11, 1821, in Springfield, Tennessee, to a family with strong political ties. His uncle, Cave Johnson, served as a U.S. Congressman and the Postmaster General. Couts graduated from the United States Military Academy at West Point in 1843 and was commissioned as a second lieutenant in the U.S. Army, joining the regiment of Mounted Rifles.

== Career ==
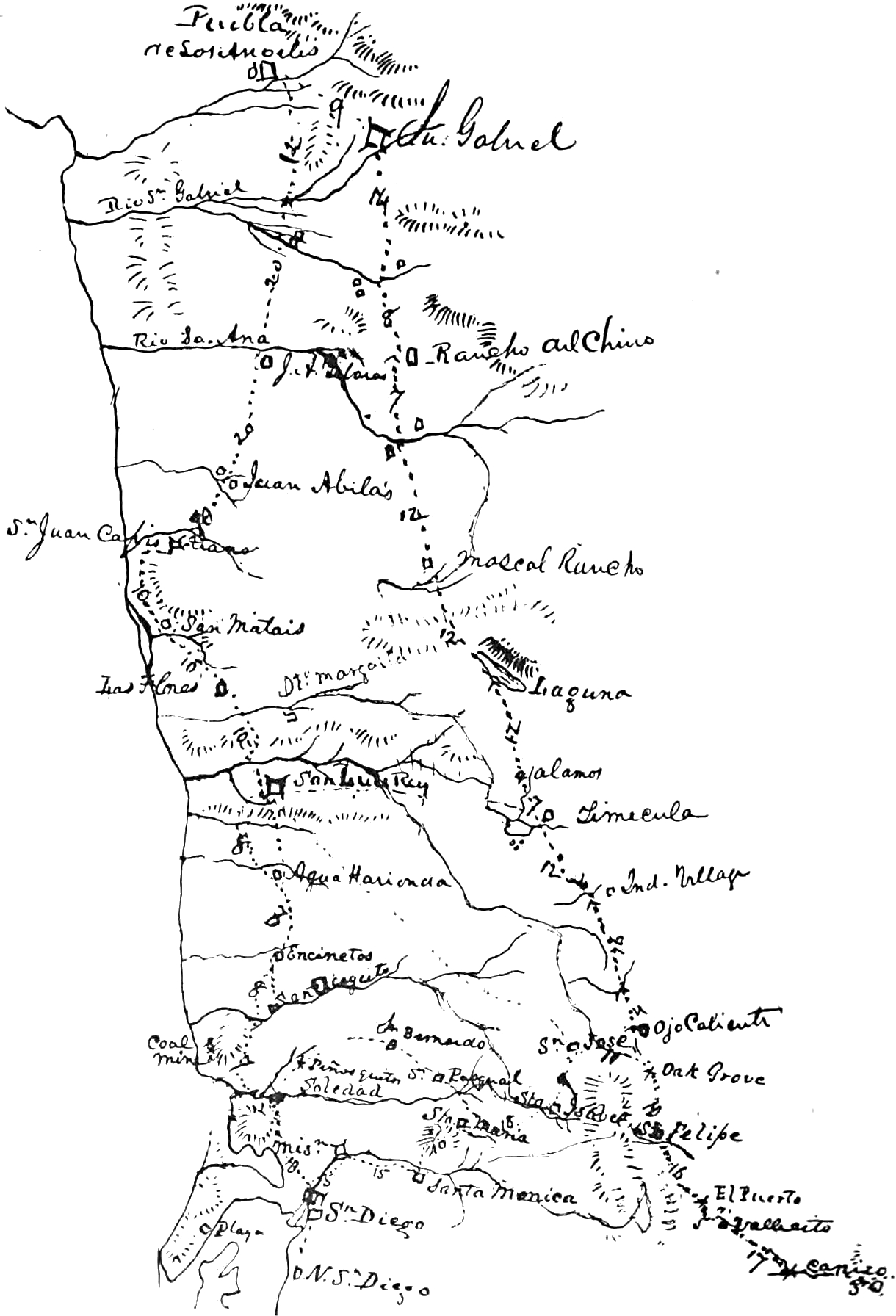
El Camino Real and Couts Path, drawn in 1850 by Couts.

Couts began his military service stationed at various posts across the United States, including Fort Jesup in Louisiana and Fort Washita and Fort Gibson in Indian Territory. In 1848, he was sent to California with his men, arriving in January 1849 after a difficult journey across the Sonoran Desert. His mission included assisting in the Boundary Survey between Upper California in the United States and Baja California in Mexico. Couts established a post at the confluence of the Colorado River and Gila River, which he named Camp Calhoun. He also helped manage relationships with local Native Americans and assisted Gold Rush emigrants; on September 23, 1849, Couts established Camp Salvation in Calexico, California, to help gold rush refugees traveling on the Southern Emigrant Trail. The camp closed December 1 and has since become a California Historical Landmark.

In October 1851, Couts resigned his Army commission. He was then appointed a colonel as the aide de camp, or personal assistant, of Governor John Bigler. After retiring from the Army, he lived in old San Diego and became a county judge (of the "Judges of the Plains"). In 1851, Couts was second-in-command of the volunteer force that suppressed the Indian Garra Revolt and was elected Justice of the Peace from 1853 to 1863. In June 1853, Indian Affairs Superintendent Edward Fitzgerald Beale appointed Couts as an Indian subagent to the agent and neighboring ranchero Benjamin Davis Wilson upon the latter's recommendation. On August 10, 1856, Couts briefly became a special Indian agent. He checked up on the Indigenous people in San Diego County and wrote reports on their status and possible improvement to the Commissioner of Indian Affairs. At the Mission San Luis Rey de Francia and Rancho Monserate, he became the supervisor of the indigenous people there and employed 300 of them in construction jobs.

Couts was thrice acquitted of crimes stemming from his violent temper. In 1855, he whipped two Luiseño with a rawhide lasso, killing one; he was indicted twice and acquitted as one of the grand jurors was not a citizen. In 1863, due to a Smallpox epidemic, Couts sent his brother and two servants to prevent the burial on a cemetery on Guajome land of a ranchero neighbor who died of smallpox; when the funeral attendees refused to stop the procession, Couts's party fired upon the crowd, killing one and wounding two. The charges were dismissed as the district attorney had not posted his bond of office. On February 6, 1865, Couts encountered Juan Mendoza, a former majordomo at Rancho Guajome, in the town plaza. Mendoza had a history of threatening Couts; however, historians Iris Engstrand and Thomas L. Scharf have stated that, on this occasion, Mendoza "apparently tried to avoid a conflict". Nevertheless, Couts shot him twice, killing him. Benjamin Ignatius Hayes, acting as Couts's counsel, argued that Mendoza had been a robber and a troublemaker, and that Couts had acted in self-defense; Couts was again acquitted.

== Ranching ==
Before arriving in San Diego, Couts was stationed in Los Angeles. During his service there, he was accused of being involved in a gambling operation alongside two civilians. The U.S. Army brought charges of conduct unbecoming an officer and a gentleman, but owing to a shortage of commissioned officers in California at the time, the proceedings were deferred. Couts was eventually tried by court-martial on December 27, 1850, and was acquitted.

Casa de Rancho Guajome, San Luis Rey, San Diego County, CA

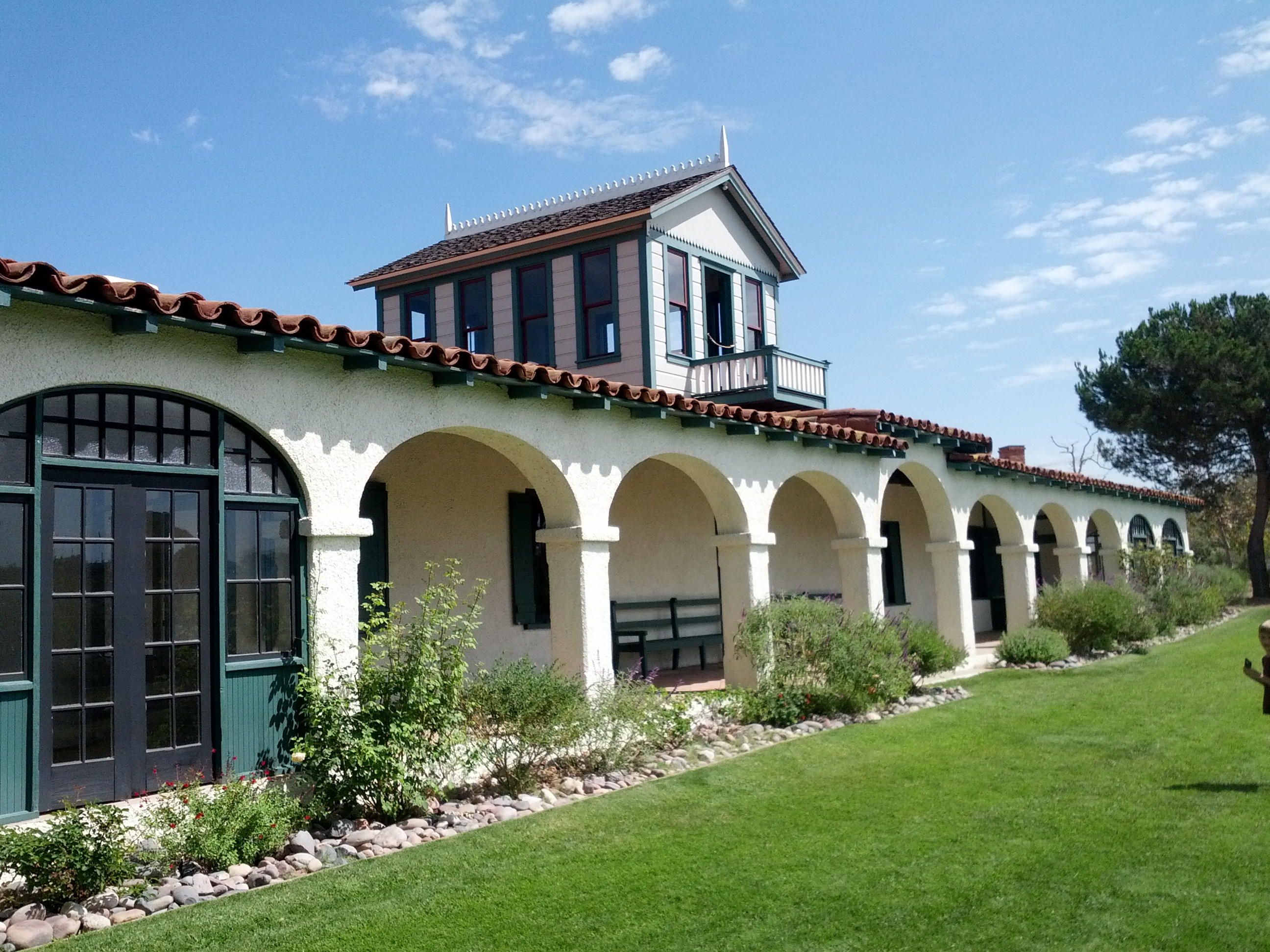
The Rancho Guajome Adobe (built 1852–1853) is the second oldest building in Vista.

After retiring from military service, Couts settled in San Diego County, becoming an influential rancher and agricultural pioneer. Couts married Doña Ysidora Bandini (1829–1897) on April 5, 1851, with whom he had 10 children. Ysidora was the daughter of Don Juan Bandini whom was an alcaldes of the Pueblo of San Diego, and sister of Arcadia Bandini de Stearns Baker. The Bandinis were a prominent early San Diego family; Juan Bandini had worked for the Mexican government and was the son of Don José Bandini, an admiral in the Spanish Navy. Abel Stearns, merchant and husband to Arcadia, gifted the 2,219-acre land grant that would become the Rancho Guajome to Ysidora and Couts.

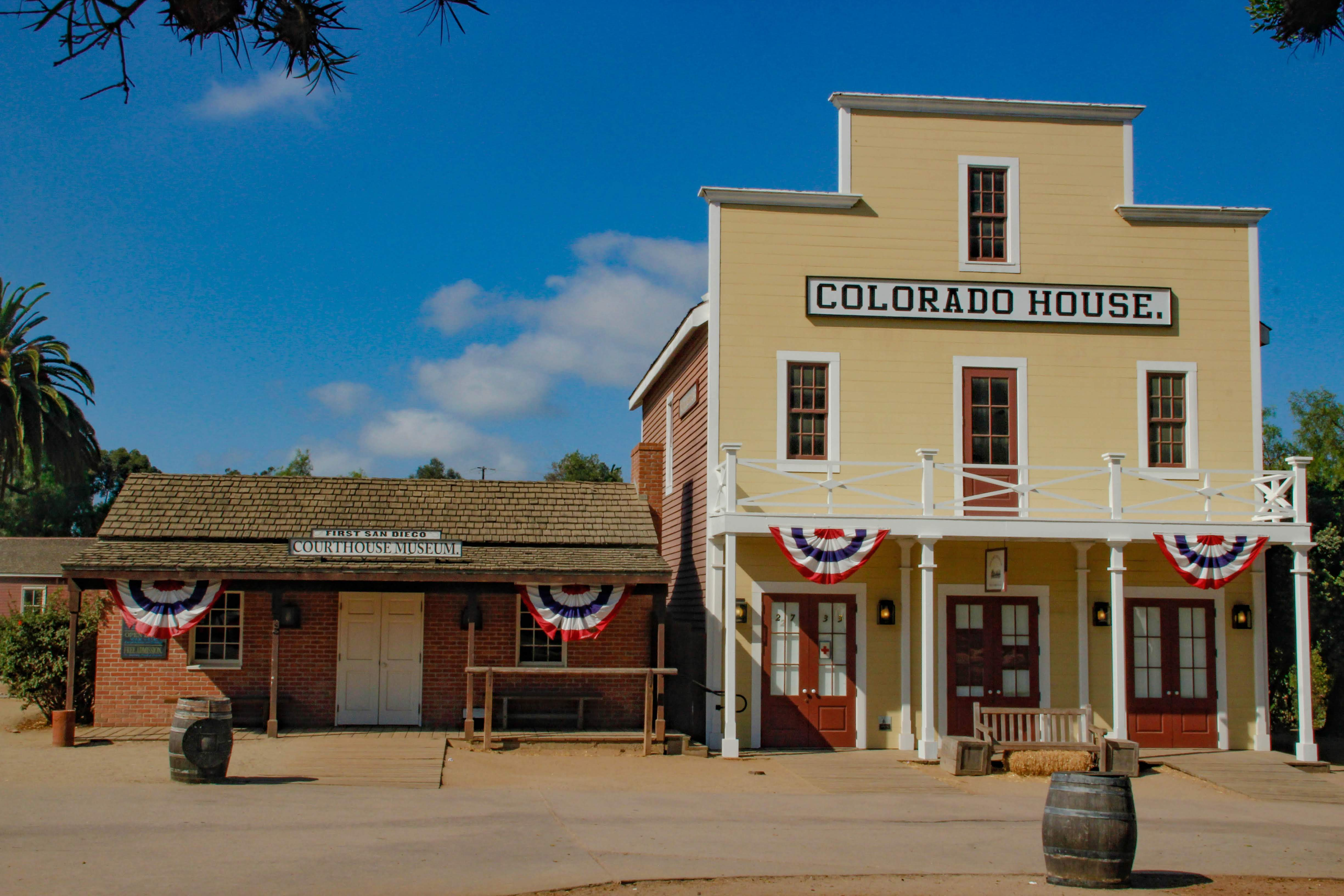
(Reconstructed by California State Parks in 1992) First San Diego Court House and Colorado House in Old Town San Diego State Historic Park (in 2018). Also used as the Closed Wells Fargo History Museum.

On June 15, 1850, the same day Joshua Bean was elected the first mayor of San Diego, he sold City Hall and the surrounding pueblo lands to himself and Couts for $2.50. Bean acted while still vested with the authority of an alcalde. Believing himself the lawful owner, Bean asserted control over the building, and he and Couts occupied additional offices for private use. At the same time, Couts began constructing a two-story frame building adjacent to the courthouse. The city council investigated the sale. It was determined that although Señora María Antonia Machado Amador (daughter to José Manuel Machado) had sold the deed to Bean, she believed he was acting on behalf of the city. On August 20, 1850, the council submitted its findings to the district court.

The case was tried on January 7, 1851, and Judge Oliver S. Witherby ruled in favor of the city, ordering Bean and Couts to relinquish their claims and pay court costs. Couts was permitted to retain the adjacent structure, known as the Colorado House hotel. He later shifted his focus to ranching and subdivided the building for commercial use. The town hall and courthouse remained in use until their destruction by fire on April 20, 1872.

Couts moved to Guajome in March 1853, and at his Rancho Guajome—a 2,219-acre (898 ha) property he owned with his wife—Couts found that San Diego County soil and climate could grow many types of crops; Couts was the first in San Diego County to plant vast fruit orchards, and he proceeded to experiment with various crops.

Additionally, Couts indentured vast indigenous employees; more than half of his 32 permanent ranch employees were members of the local Luiseño tribe. Under the provisions of the local Indian Acts, Couts bound several Native workers to himself through convict leasing (and other forms of Penal labor in the United States) for vague "vagrancy" charges and debt peonage. As county judge, he declared indigenous children as orphans and indentured them to his wife, and as Indian subagent, he unconventionally installed mestizo Kumeyaay Indian rancher Manuel Cota as Luiseño chief and established a profitable partnership in Indian power and labor. Corporal punishment was common on his ranch.

Couts and Ysidora were popular among social circles and known for their hospitality and fiestas at the Rancho Guajome. Historian Wallace W. Elliott characterized him as "a congenial companion, fond of music and dancing, and a popular figure in all social circles", and Benjamin Ignatius Hayes admired Ysidora as "vivacious, mild, witty, intelligent". Couts's rancho did very well, and he purchased the nearby ranchos of Rancho Vallecitos de San Marcos in 1866, Rancho Buena Vista in 1866, and La Jolla. At the peak of his success, Couts's ranch spanned approximately 20,000 acres.

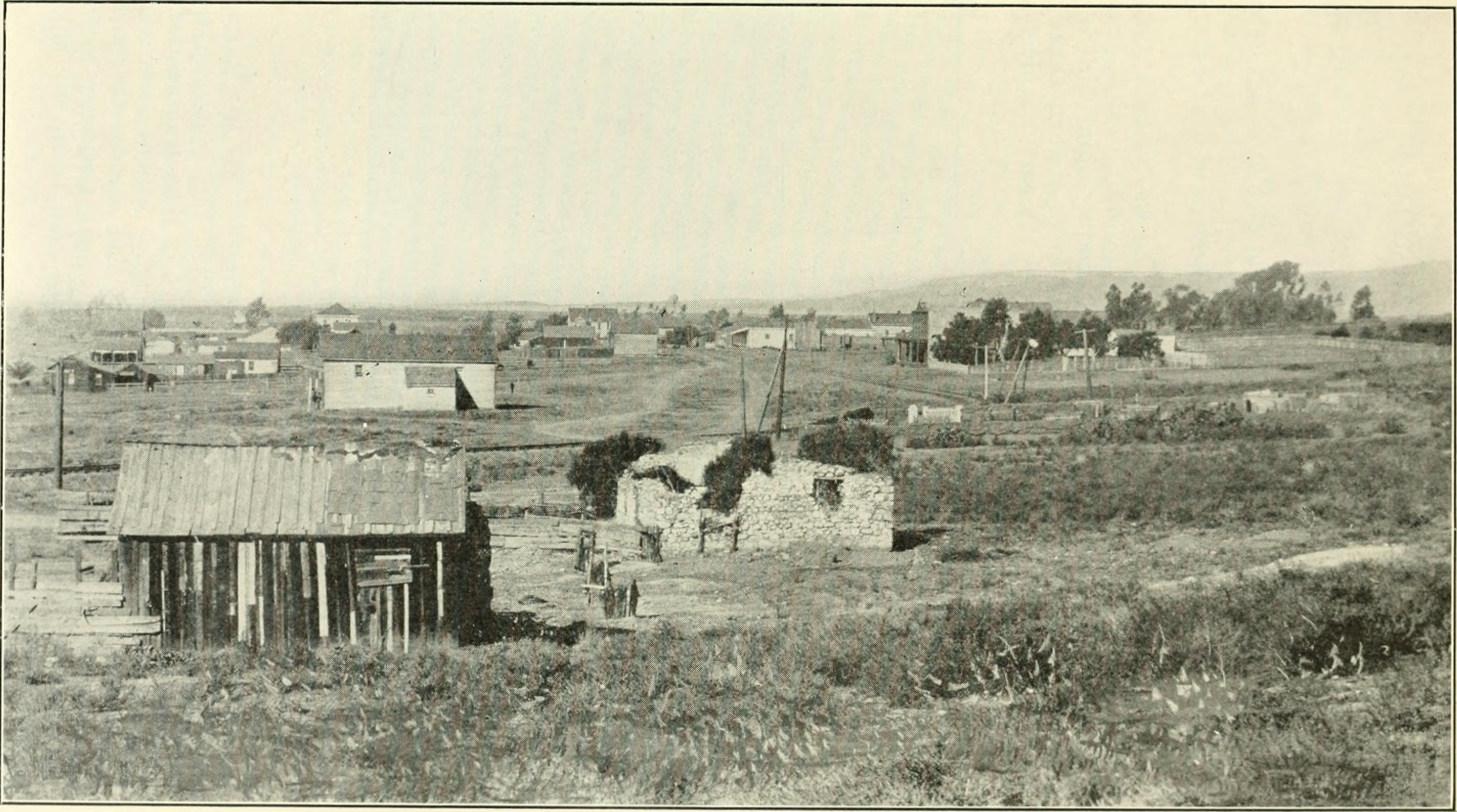
The Casa de Lopez, Old Town, San Diego—a landmark near the events of 1851, when Cave J. Couts, serving as jury foreman, pronounced the sentence of death upon James 'Yankee Jim' Robinson for boat theft. The execution marked one of early San Diego's sternest enforcements of law during the American transition.

However, the cattle boom brought by the gold rush soon subsided, and the industry quickly declined starting in the late 1850s. As Congress passed the Anti-Peonage Act of 1867 for African-American laborers, reformist Indian agents used the law to restore the rights of Indian workers. Despite a drought in the mid-1860s that killed most herds and caused many ranchers to liquidate their land holdings, Couts held on and pivoted in part to sheep ranching. As his wealth still mostly consisted of cattle, his holdings were severely impacted by the passage of a no-fence law in 1872: ranchers now assumed liability for damage to farmers' crops from unfenced herds, forcing Couts to sell much of his livestock at extremely low prices.

== Death and legacy ==
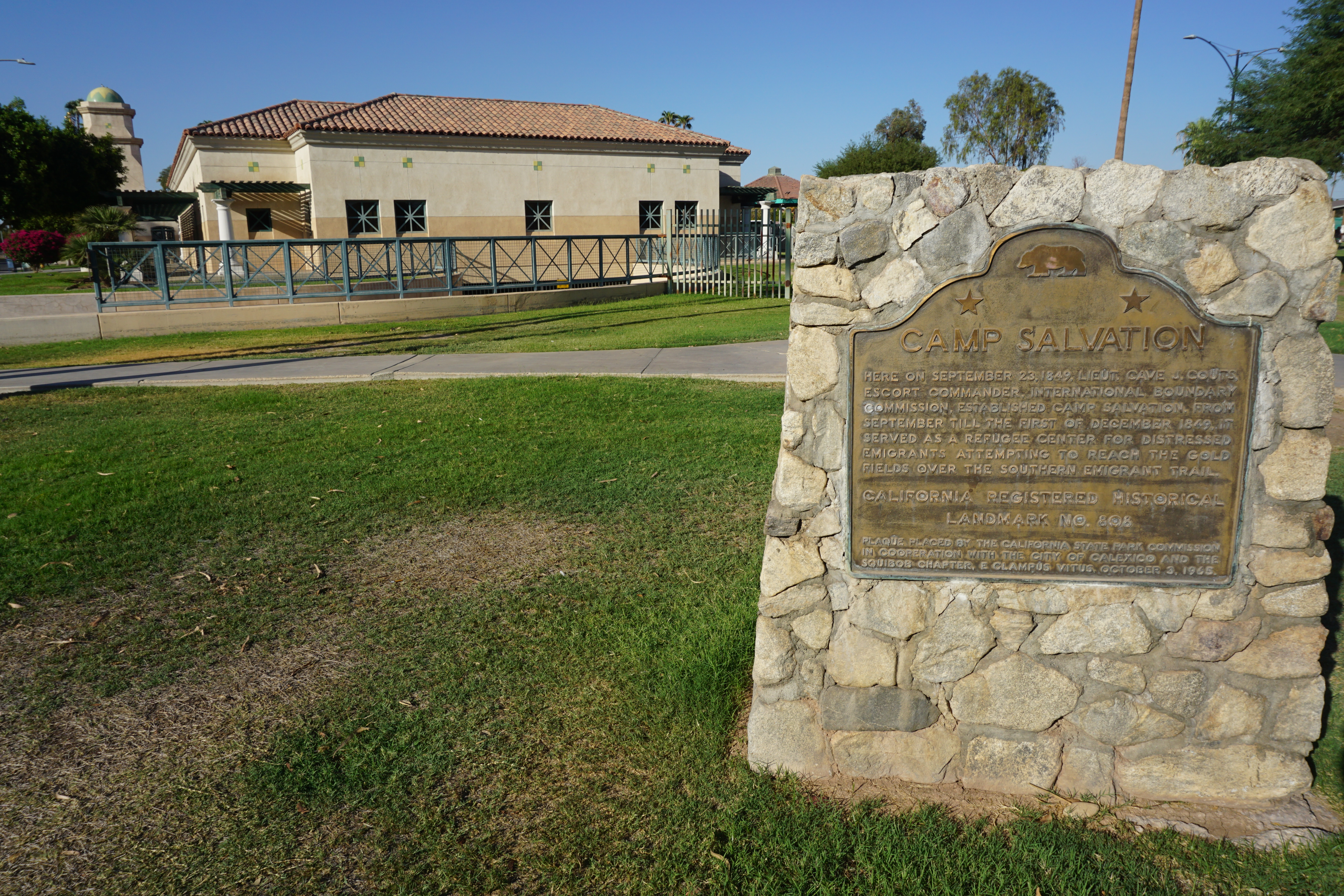
Camp Salvation as of 2018

By Spring 1874, Couts could no longer ranch, burdened by market declines and severe chest pain diagnosed as a terminal aortic aneurysm in San Francisco. Two weeks after losing consciousness, Couts died on July 10, 1874, at the Horton House in San Diego. His fourth son Cave Johnson Couts Jr. became an engineer who was deputy surveyor for San Diego County and later managed Couts's Rancho Guajome, which is now preserved as the Guajome Regional Park in Vista, California, and is listed as a California Historical Landmark and on the National Register of Historic Places. His innovative agricultural techniques helped develop the region into a productive farming area.

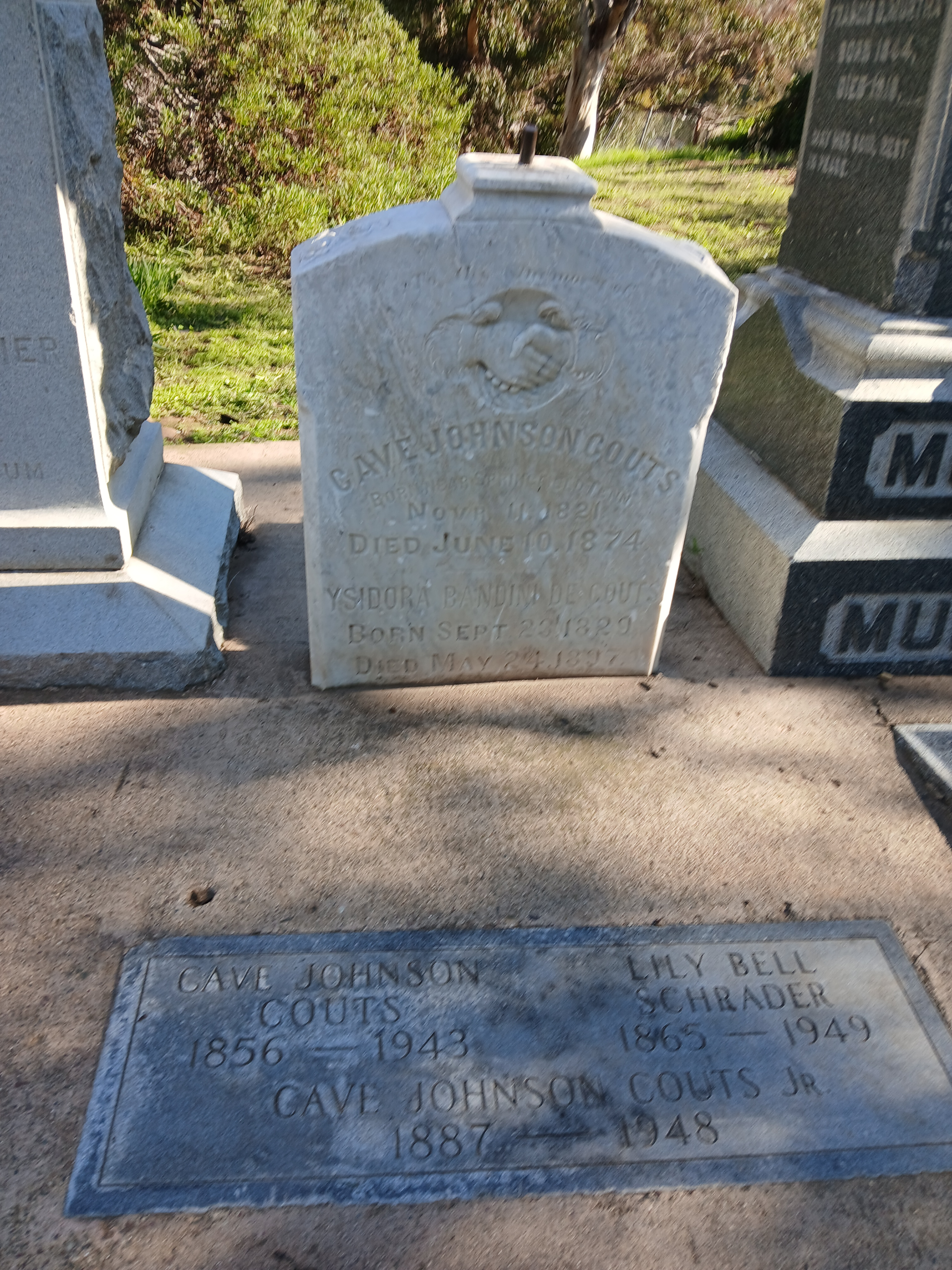
His headstone at Pioneer Park

Couts's detailed journals have provided regional historians with a wealth of information about his life and times. He kept detailed diaries and records of his dealings, which he stored in an iron safe. Historian Michael Magliari chose to write on Couts as a microcosm of Indian slavery in California as Couts was a "terrible guy, but a terrific record keeper". Leland Stanford used Couts's extensive meeting notes to trace the history of San Diego's Judges of the Plains and said "in this hero’s shadow, however, lurked nepotism, arrogance, quarrelsomeness, questionable husbandry, and possible wrongful subjugation of indian proteges over whom, as federal sub-agent for such natives in his area, he held autocratic power", while W. E. Smythe, in his History of San Diego, called Couts "a man of good education, strict integrity, and gentlemanly manners".

== Published works ==
- Cave Johnson Couts, Hepah, California!: The journal of Cave Johnson Couts from Monterey, Nuevo Leon, Mexico, to Los Angeles, California, during the years 1848-1849, eds. Henry F. Dobyns and Samuel E. Chamberlain (Tucson: Arizona Pioneers' Historical Society, 1961).
- Cave Johnson Couts, From San Diego to the Colorado in 1849: The Journal and Maps of Cave J. Couts, ed. William McPherson (Los Angeles: A.M. Ellis, 1932)

== See also ==
- Fort Yuma – US Army fort (1851–1853) in California near Yuma, Arizona
- Camp Salvation (Calexico) – Refugee camp along the Southern Emigrant Trail
- Forced labor in California – Labour laws in the United States
- Rancho Monserate – Mexican land grant in California
- Calexico–Mexicali – Transborder agglomeration in California and Baja California
- Tennessee in the American Civil War
- Imperial County – County in California, United States
- Cosmopolitan Hotel and Restaurant
- California Constitutional Conventions – Two 19th-century state conventions in the United States
- Justus McKinstry – American army officer
