= Rancho Guajome Adobe =

Historic house in California, United States

- U.S. National Register of Historic Places
- U.S. National Historic Landmark
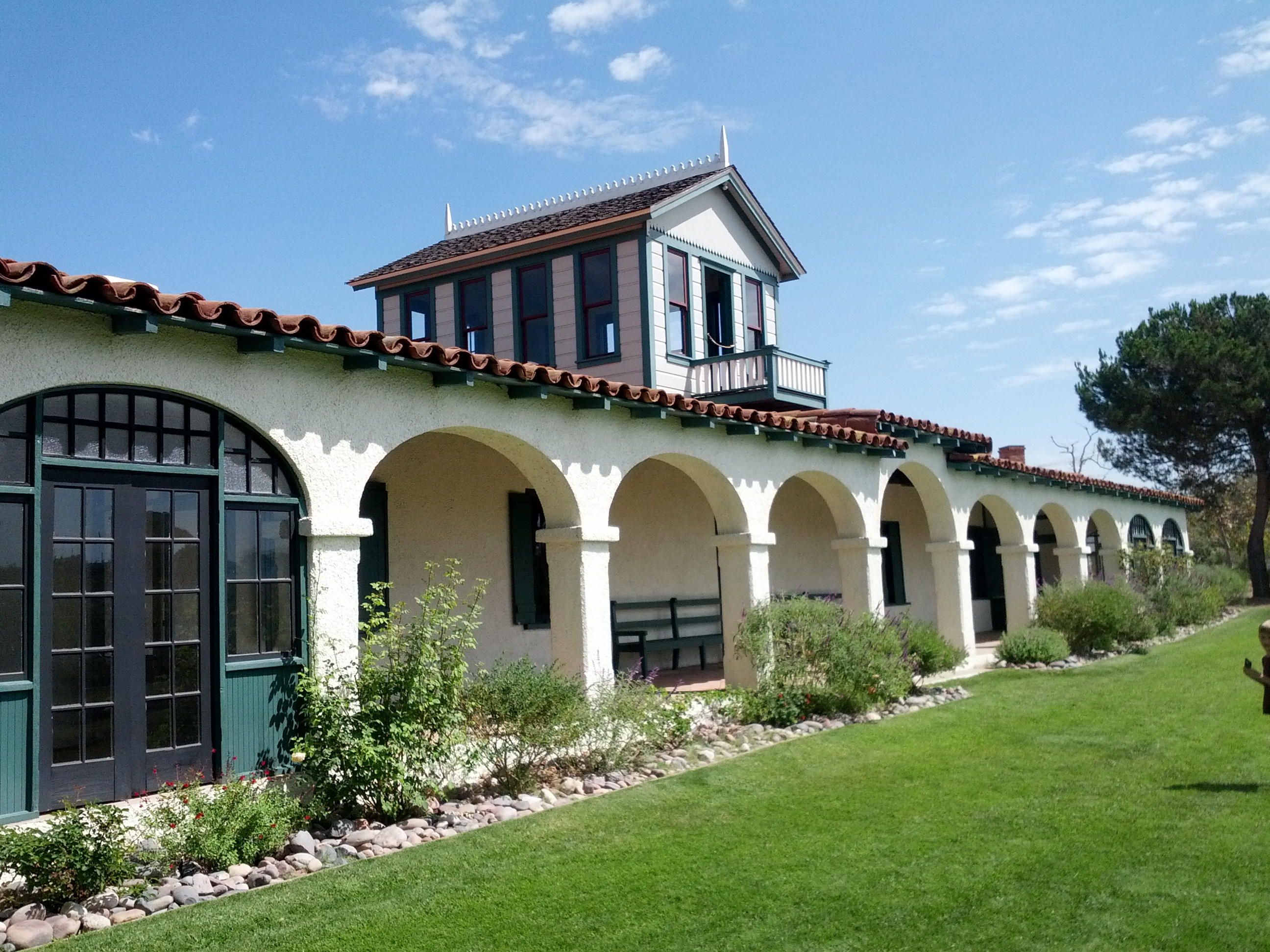

- Location within San Diego County, California Location within California Location within the United States
- Location: Vista, California
- Coordinates: 33°13′59.59″N 117°15′14.42″W
- Area: 158 acres (64 ha) (landmarked area)
- Built: 1852–1853
- Architectural style: Spanish—Mexican Colonial adobe
- NRHP reference No.: 70000145

Significant dates
- Added to NRHP: April 15, 1970
- Designated NHL: April 15, 1970

Rancho Guajome Adobe is a historic 19th-century hacienda (and now a historic house museum) in Rancho Guajome Adobe County Park, on North Santa Fe Avenue in Vista in San Diego County, California. Built in 1852–53, it is a well-preserved but late example of Spanish-Mexican colonial architecture, and was designated a National Historic Landmark in 1970. It is also a California Historical Landmark and on the National Register of Historic Places.

== Description ==
Rancho Guajome Adobe is located in the northwestern part of Vista, on the south side of North Santa Fe Avenue. It is located just east of Guajome County Park, a larger park on the north side of the road. The adobe complex includes the main house, around which are arrayed a number of outbuildings. The main house is a large, rambling, 20-room, Spanish Colonial-style hacienda with two courtyards, and an arcaded veranda. The arches on the veranda are not original to the house, however; they were added in the 1920s during the height of Mission and Spanish Colonial Revival architecture. The outbuildings include stables, a blacksmith shop, chapel, and carriage house.

== History ==
The adobe was built in 1852 and served as the headquarters of Rancho Guajome, a Mexican land grant. Abel Stearns had given the rancho to Ysidora Bandini (sister of his wife Arcadia Bandini), as a wedding gift when she married Cave Johnson Couts in 1851. It was built with the profits from the cattle boom of the 1850s, when many California ranchos supplied the Gold Rush miners and associated new American immigrants with meat and leather.

Couts was appointed sub-agent for the native Luiseño people (San Luis Rey Mission Indians) in 1853. He used their labor to improve his properties in the area, including this one and nearby Rancho Buena Vista and Rancho Vallecitos de San Marcos.

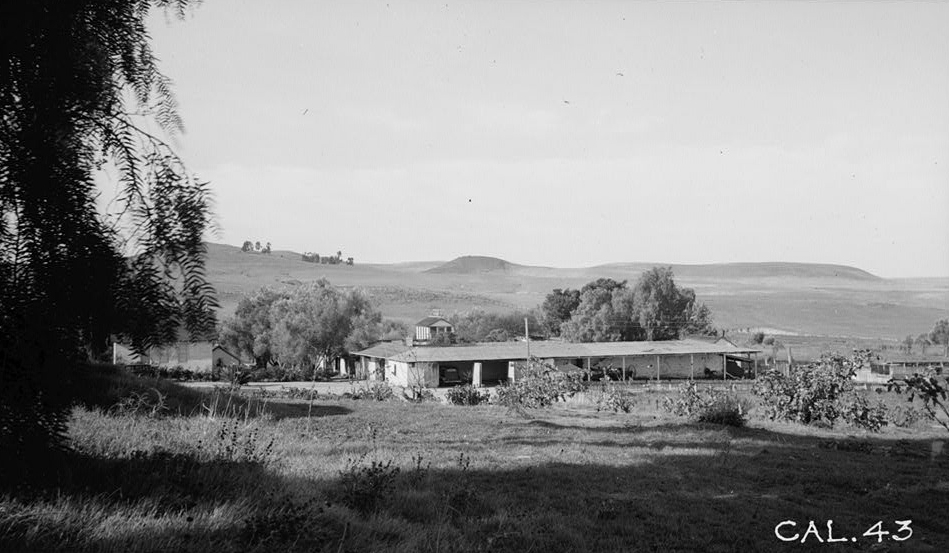
Northwestern view of Rancho Guajome landscape and adobes (1936).

Ownership of the rancho eventually passed from the Couts family to Mrs. Ida Kunzell Richardson and her two children, Belda and Earl (born in 1919 and 1920, respectively, during her 7-year marriage to Fred C. Wehmeyer). Ida petitioned for a divorce from Wehmeyer in 1923 and it was finalized in 1925. Sometime in the 1920s Ida, Belda and Earl Richardson moved into the Rancho Guajome Adobe and the family lived with Cave Couts, Jr. until his death in 1943. Cave Johnson Couts III, son of Cave Johnson Couts, Jr., died in 1948 (5 years after his father). This left Ida Richardson and both of her children with a life estate on the ranch as provided for them in the will of Cave Couts, Jr. in exchange for her years of faithful service as his housekeeper and companion. Mrs. Richardson's son, Earl "Sonny" Richardson, ran the ranch until the County of San Diego purchased it for just over $1,000,000 as a result of condemnation proceedings finalized in 1973. Beginning in the 1970s, the county undertook a major rehabilitation of the property, which was completed in 1996. It is now the centerpiece of a county park 112 acres (45 ha) in size. Guided and self-guided tours are available, and the park facilities are available for special events.

== See also ==
- List of National Historic Landmarks in California - federal
- National Register of Historic Places listings in San Diego County, California — federal
- California Historical Landmarks in San Diego County, California — state
- Index — Ranchos of San Diego County, California
- List of Ranchos of California
