= Rancho La Tajauta =

Mexican land grant in California

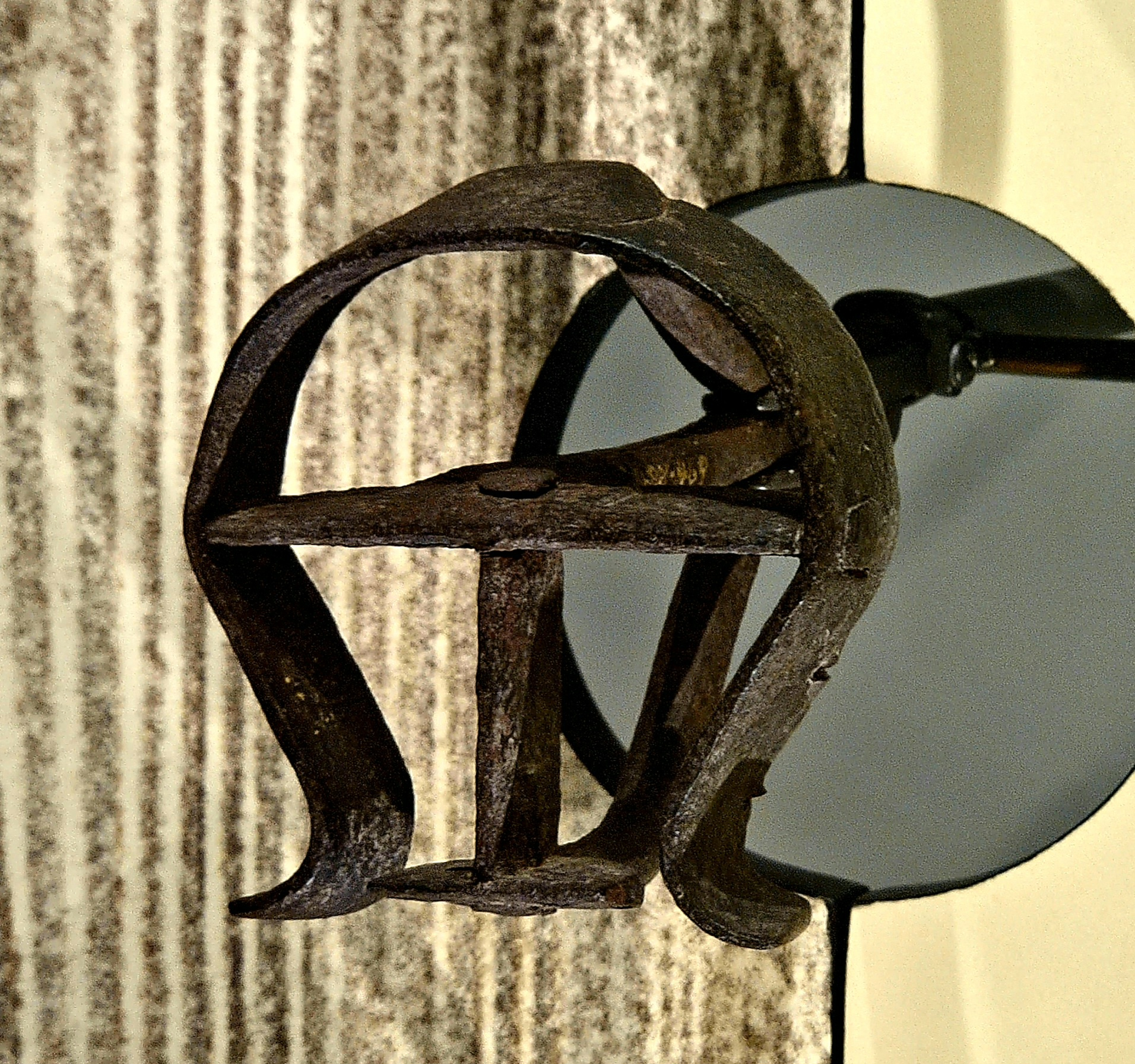
- Rancho La Tajauta branding iron
- Town/City: Los Angeles, CA (Watts); Los Angeles County
- State: California
- Country: United States
- Coordinates: 33°55′46″N 118°14′33″W
- Established: 1843
- Owner: Anastasio Avila
- Area: 3,560 acres (14.4 km^{2})
- Status: Limited public access

Rancho Tajauta was a 3,560-acre (14.4 km^{2}) Mexican land grant in present-day Los Angeles County, California, given in 1843 by Governor Manuel Micheltorena to Anastasio Avila. The grant was named for the Gabrielino/Tongva place name of Tajáuta. The grant encompassed present-day Willowbrook and Watts.

== History ==
Anastasio Avila, one of the sons of Cornelio Avila, was alcalde of Los Angeles in 1819 – 1821, and granted one square league in 1843.

With the cession of California to the United States following the Mexican-American War, the 1848 Treaty of Guadalupe Hidalgo provided that the land grants would be honored. As required by the Land Act of 1851, a claim for Rancho La Tajauta was filed with the Public Land Commission in 1852, and the grant was patented to Anastasio's son Enrique Avila in 1873. Rancho Tajauta was surveyed in 1858 by Henry Hancock, deputy United States surveyor, and the survey approved in 1860.

The legacy of Rancho Tajauta survives in the name Tajauta Avenue in the Compton/Carson area.

== See also ==
- Ranchos of California
- List of Ranchos of California
- Watts, California
- Category: Tongva populated places
