= Rancho Guajome =

Mexican land grant in California

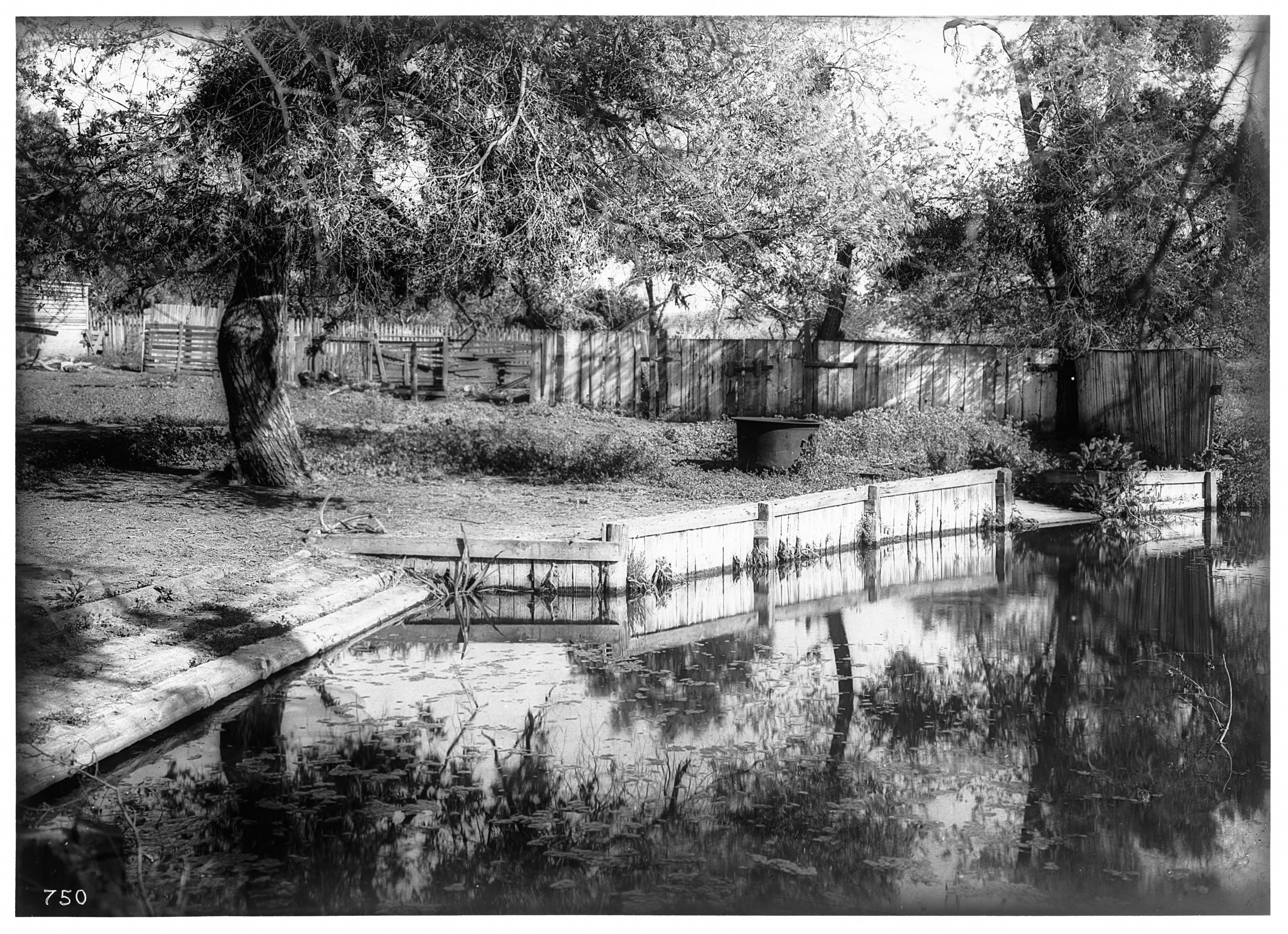
- Interactive map of Rancho Guajome
- 33.260°N 117.270°W
- Location: Near Vista, California

California Historical Landmark
- Designated: 1981
- Reference no.: 940

Rancho Guajome was a 2,219-acre (8.98 km^{2}) Mexican land grant in present-day San Diego County, California, given in 1845 by Governor Pío Pico to Indian brothers Andrés and José Manuel. The name comes from a Luiseño phrase involving the word "frog", likely wakhavumi "frog pond" or waxáawu-may "little frog". The grant was south of the San Luis Rey River and Rancho Monserate and north of present-day Vista. The site is now registered as California Historical Landmark #940.

== History ==
Formerly a part of Mission San Luis Rey lands, the half square league grant was made to Andrés and José Manuel, two mission Indians.

The brothers sold the land to Abel Stearns. Stearns held onto the land for a few years before giving it to his sister-in-law, Ysidora Bandini, as a wedding gift when she married Lieutenant Cave Johnson Couts in 1851. Stearns was married to Ysidora Bandini's sister Arcadia.

Cave Johnson Couts (pron. "cow-ts", 1821–1874) was a native of Tennessee and was a nephew of Cave Johnson. Couts graduated from West Point in 1843 and came to California in 1849 as a U.S. Army lieutenant in the forces occupying California following the Mexican–American War. Couts left the Army, and settled in the San Diego area. In 1849 he was commissioned to survey and map the pueblo lands of San Diego. He married Ysidora Bandini, the daughter of Juan Bandini, in 1851. Couts began buying property and developing political influence in the area. Couts also owned Rancho Buena Vista and Rancho Vallecitos de San Marcos. Having been appointed sub-agent for the San Luis Rey Indians in 1853, Couts employed Indian labor to improve the properties.

With the cession of California to the United States following the Mexican–American War, the 1848 Treaty of Guadalupe Hidalgo provided that the land grants would be honored. As required by the Land Act of 1851, a claim for Rancho Guajome was filed with the Public Land Commission in 1852, and the grant was patented to Andres Solme and Catarina in 1871 (patent No. 519).

By the time the Couts family settled on Rancho Guajome in 1853, Cave was prospering by supplying beef and leather to the Bay Area during the gold rush era. After Couts's death in 1874, the Rancho was managed by his son, Cave Couts Jr. (1856–1943). Cave Couts Jr. left the Rancho to his children. San Diego County acquired the rancho adobe from Earl Richardson, Couts' youngest son, in 1973.

== Historic sites of the Rancho ==
- Rancho Guajome Adobe. Adobe built by Cave Johnson Couts.
