= Rincon del Diablo, California =

Unincorporated community in California, United States

- Community
- Location within California Location within the United States
- Coordinates: 33°5′59″N 117°0′26″W
- Country: United States
- State: California
- County: San Diego
- Elevation: 741 ft (226 m)
- Time zone: UTC-8 (Pacific (PST))
  - Summer (DST): UTC-7 (PDT)
- ZIP code: 92025, 92027
- Area codes: 760 & 442
- GNIS feature ID: 248201

Rincon del Diablo (Spanish Rincón del Diablo, meaning "Corner of the Devil") is a community in San Diego County, California. Because it predates Escondido and other geopolitical boundaries, it does not necessarily correspond to present day definitions.

Western and northern parts of the community contain low-density semi-rural housing. Southeastern part is agricultural. The Orfila winery is located on the border between Rincon del Diablo and San Diego.

The community is divided between Zip Codes 92025 and 92027. The area code is 760. In part, is within the "sphere of influence" of Escondido, and therefore those parts may eventually be annexed to the city. Current city policies prevent the city from actively seeking annexation of new land and require property owners to petition to be annexed, a slow and expensive process.

It shares the name with the original Rancho Rincon del Diablo that included the city of Escondido and surrounding areas in the 19th century. Rincon del Diablo means "Corner of the devil or where evil ones abide" in Spanish referring to lands outside Christianity or unenlightened - a dark place to fear. In reference to the beliefs of that period being what is not of Christians belongs to evil. The full name was likely shortened to simply Rincon del Diablo as the Rancho identified this specific place whereas Spanish maps of the lands known labeled the unknown as harboring evils.

The United States Census Bureau does not provide demographic estimates for the community. Rincon Del Diablo includes census tract 207.06 of San Diego County. According to SANDAG estimates, total population of census tract 207.06 is 6,159 people. Median household income is $116,487. 19.2% are under the age of 18 and 17.3% are over 65. Median age is 46.1 years. Ethnic makeup is 76.5% non-Hispanic White, 15.7% Hispanic, 4.4% Asian / Pacific Islander. In 2008, there were 4,572 registered voters in the community.
