= Recogida =

Recogida, a Spanish word meaning "to pick up". It is used to mean to collect things like garbage or mail, pick up people or goods, in agriculture to gather, pick or harvest. In animal husbandry, in Spanish America, recogidas or round-ups, were held to gather up horses, (often wild mesteños in the open range), to divide and allocate them among their owners, similar to the original practice of the rodeo for cattle, which was presided over by the Jueces del Campo (Judges of the Plains). In 1851, this office, its one year term and its duties were established in California law. Among these was:

"§3. Whenever any dispute arises respecting the ownership, mark, or brand of any horse, mule, jack, jenny, or horned cattle, it shall be the duty of the judges of the plains to decide on such dispute."
