= Rancho Rincón de los Bueyes =

Mexican land grant in California

Coordinates: 34.020°N 118.390°W

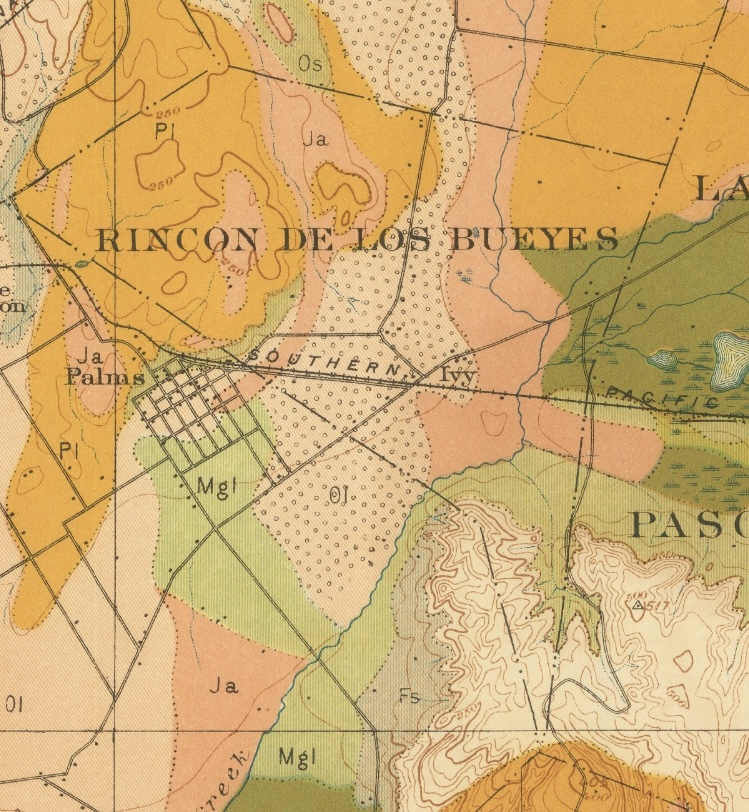
Map of Rancho Rincon de los Bueyes (1903)

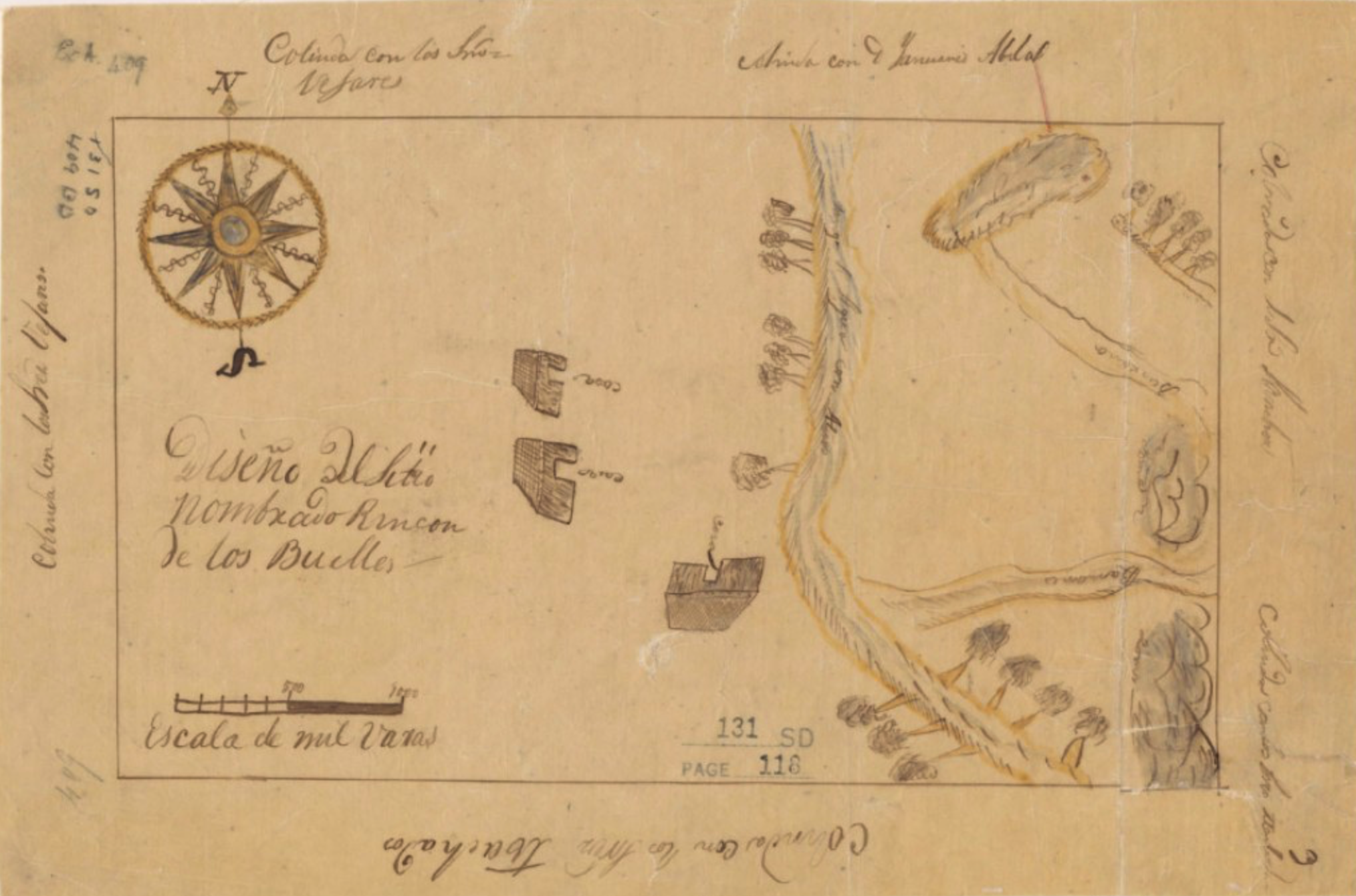
Drawing of Rancho Rincon de los Bueyes, c. late 18th or early 19th century

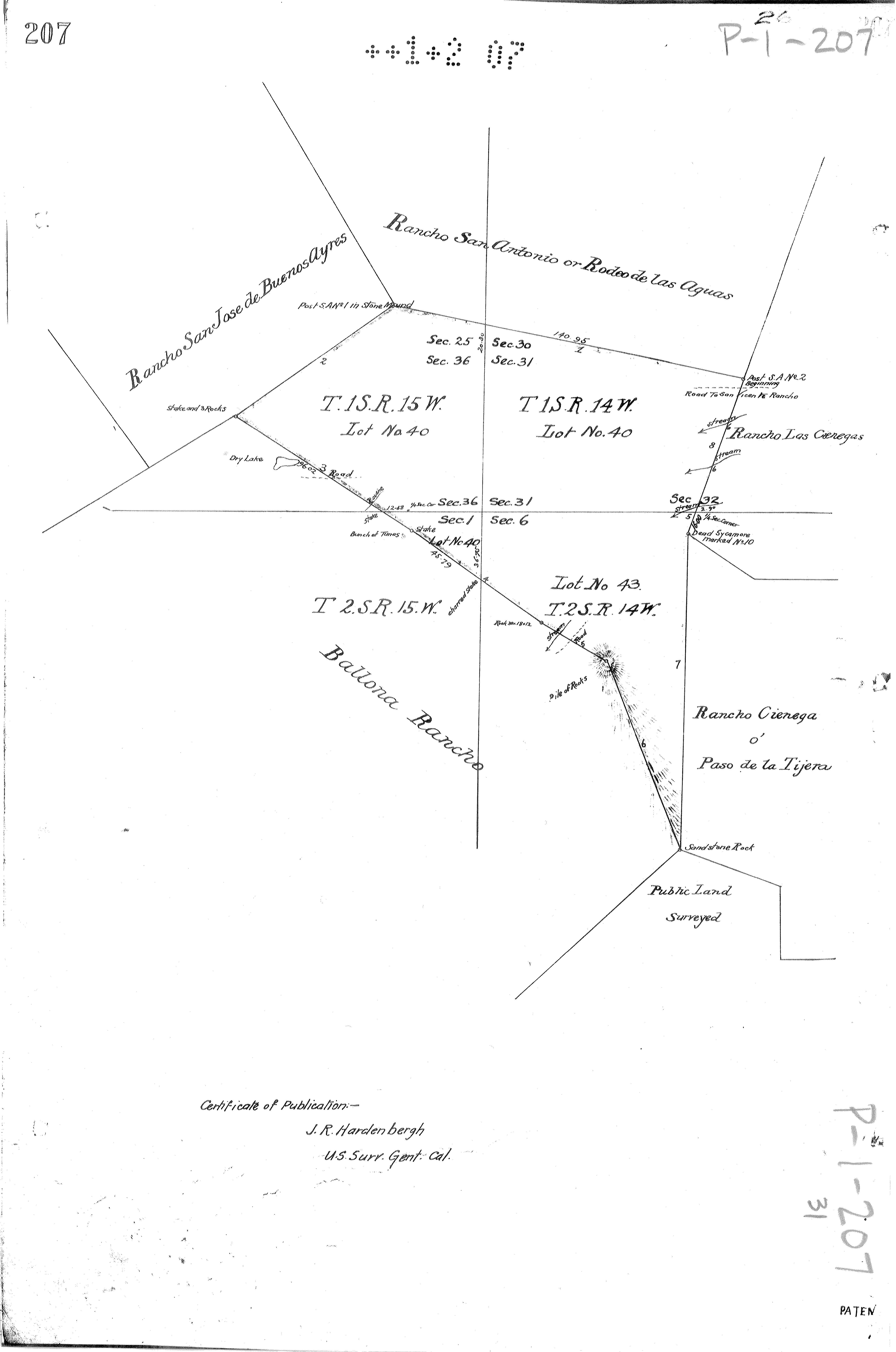
1871 Plat of Rancho Rincon de los Bueyes

Rancho Rincón de los Bueyes was a 3,127-acre (12.65 km^{2}) land grant in present-day Los Angeles County, California, given in 1821 to Bernardo Higuera and Cornelio Lopez by Pablo Vicente de Sola, the Spanish Governor of Alta California. In 1843, this Spanish grant was confirmed by Mexican Governor Manuel Micheltorena. Rincón, translated from Spanish, means corner or nook, and Bueyes are oxen or steer.

== Geography ==
The grant was, for the most part, diamond shaped, with the exception of the southeast corner extending over one mile deeper than the other three corners. It was relatively small for a Spanish concession at that time and it was surrounded on all sides by five different ranchos. To the east there were two: Rancho Las Cienegas and Rancho La Cienega o Paso de la Tijera. On the west, there was Rancho La Ballona. Bordering the northwest boundary was Rancho San Jose de Buenos Ayres and to the northeast there was Rancho Rodeo de las Aguas. Rincón de Los Bueyes encompasses present day Cheviot Hills, Rancho Park, the northeast extension of Culver City, and a small section of Baldwin Hills with Ballona Creek.

== History ==
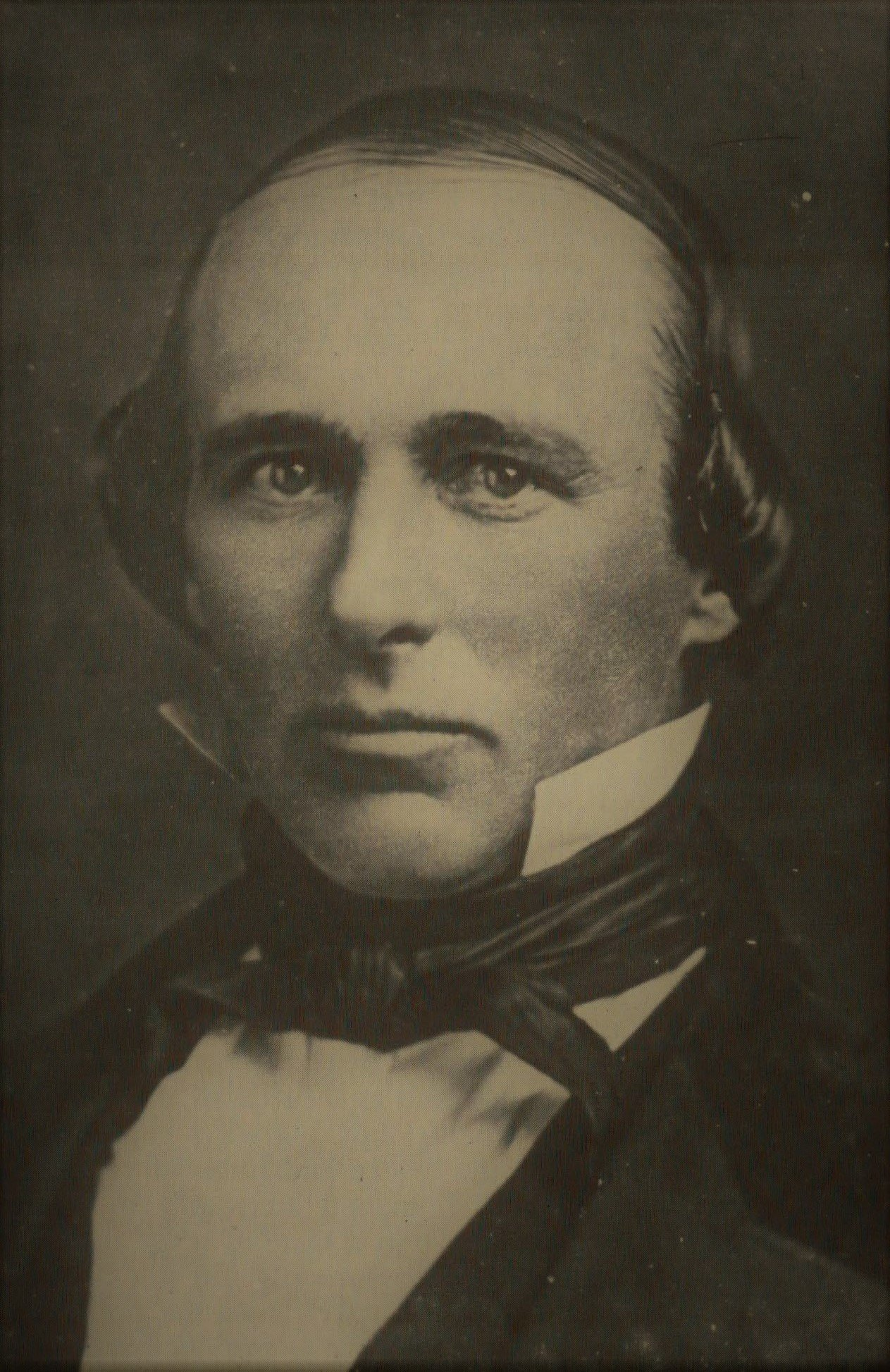
José de Arnaz.

Governor Vicente de Sola granted a concession to Bernardo Higuera (1790–1837) and Cornelio Lopez (born 1792) in 1821. Lopez soon quarreled with Higuera, leaving the latter in possession. Bernardo Higuera was the son of Joaquin Higuera, the alcalde of the Pueblo de Los Angeles in 1800. In 1834 Bernardo Higuera, and his wife, Maria del Rosario Palomares (born 1792), moved to Los Angeles, leaving his brothers Mariano (baptized 23 July 1804 Mission, San Gabriel) and Policarpio (baptized 27 January 1799, same mission) to run the ranch. Bernardo Higuera bequeathed his Rancho Rincón de los Bueyes to his two sons, Francisco and Secundino.

With the cession of California to the United States following the Mexican–American War, the 1848 Treaty of Guadalupe Hidalgo provided that the land grants would be honored. As required by the Land Act of 1851, Francisco and Secundino Higuera filed their claim for Rancho Rincón de los Bueyes with the Public Land Commission in 1852. Their claim was rejected by the Commission in 1854, but upheld by the District Court in 1861. The grant was patented to Francisco and Secundino Higuera in 1872.

In 1849, José De Arnaz (1820–1895), the grantee of Rancho Ex-Mission San Buenaventura, bought Secundino Higuera's half share, and in 1867 bought Francisco Higuera's. In 1853, José de Arnaz, filed a claim for five square leagues of Santa Clara Mission rejected. In 1869 after the death of his wife, Maria Mercedes de Avila (1832–1867), Arnaz married Maria Camarillo (1848–1916) and moved to San Jose. He later returned to live on Rancho Rincón de los Bueyes.

== See also ==
- Ranchos of California
- List of Ranchos of California
