= Rancho Vallecitos de San Marcos =

Former Land Grant located in present-day San Diego County, California

- Former Land Grant
- Etymology: Little valleys of St. Mark
- Interactive map of Rancho Vallecitos de San Marcos
- Coordinates: 33.139°N 117.159°W
- Country: United States
- State: California
- County: San Diego
- Land Grant Established: 1840
- Founder: José María Alvarado

Area
  - Total: 8,975 acres (3,632 ha)
- Time zone: UTC−08:00 (Pacific)
  - Summer (DST): UTC−07:00 (Pacific Daylight Time)

Rancho Vallecitos de San Marcos was a 8,975-acre (36.32 km^{2}) Mexican land grant in present-day northern San Diego County, California, given in 1840 by Governor Juan Alvarado to Jose María Alvarado. The name means little valleys of St. Mark. The grant was located between Rancho Rincon del Diablo of Alvarado's father, Juan Bautista Alvarado on the east and Rancho Buena Vista on the west, and encompassed present day San Marcos.

== History ==
José María Alvarado (1813–1846) and his wife María Lugarda Osuna were granted the two square league Rancho Vallecitos de San Marcos in 1840, but less than a year after taking possession, he sold the rancho to Lorenzo Soto. Lorenzo Soto (1821–1863) was the son of Francisco Soto of Rancho San Lorenzo Baja.

With the cession of California to the United States following the Mexican–American War, the 1848 Treaty of Guadalupe Hidalgo provided that the land grants would be honored. As required by the Land Act of 1851, a claim for Rancho Vallecitos de San Marcos was filed with the Public Land Commission in 1852, and the grant was patented to Lorenzo Soto in 1883.

Lorenzo Soto married first Maria Rosa Soto, and after she died in 1857, he married second María Ygnacia Morena. In 1859 Lorenzo Soto acquired Rancho Buena Vista from Jesus Machado. After Lorenzo Soto’s death in 1863, his widow, María Ygnacia Morena de Soto in 1864 married Tomas Alvarado (1841–), part owner of Rancho Monserate. Tomas Alvarado sold Rancho Vallecitos de San Marcos to Cave Johnson Couts in 1866.

Cave Johnson Couts (1821–1874), was a native of Tennessee, and was a nephew of Cave Johnson. Couts graduated from West Point in 1843 and came to California in 1849 as a lieutenant with the U.S. Army forces occupying California following the Mexican–American War. Couts left the Army, and settled in San Diego. In 1849 he was commissioned to survey and map the pueblo lands of San Diego. He married Ysidora Bandini, the daughter of Juan Bandini in 1851. Couts began buying property and developing political influence in the area. Couts also owned Rancho Guajome and Rancho Buena Vista. Having been appointed sub-agent for the San Luis Rey Indians in 1853, Couts employed Indian labor to improve the properties. After Couts died, his son, Cave J. Couts, Jr.(1856–1943), took over management of the rancho.

In 1886, a land title dispute by a Soto heir was settled in favor of the Couts heirs.

== See also ==
- Ranchos of California
- List of Ranchos of California
