= Rancho La Ciénega ó Paso de la Tijera =

Mexican land grant in California

Coordinates: 34.020°N 118.350°W

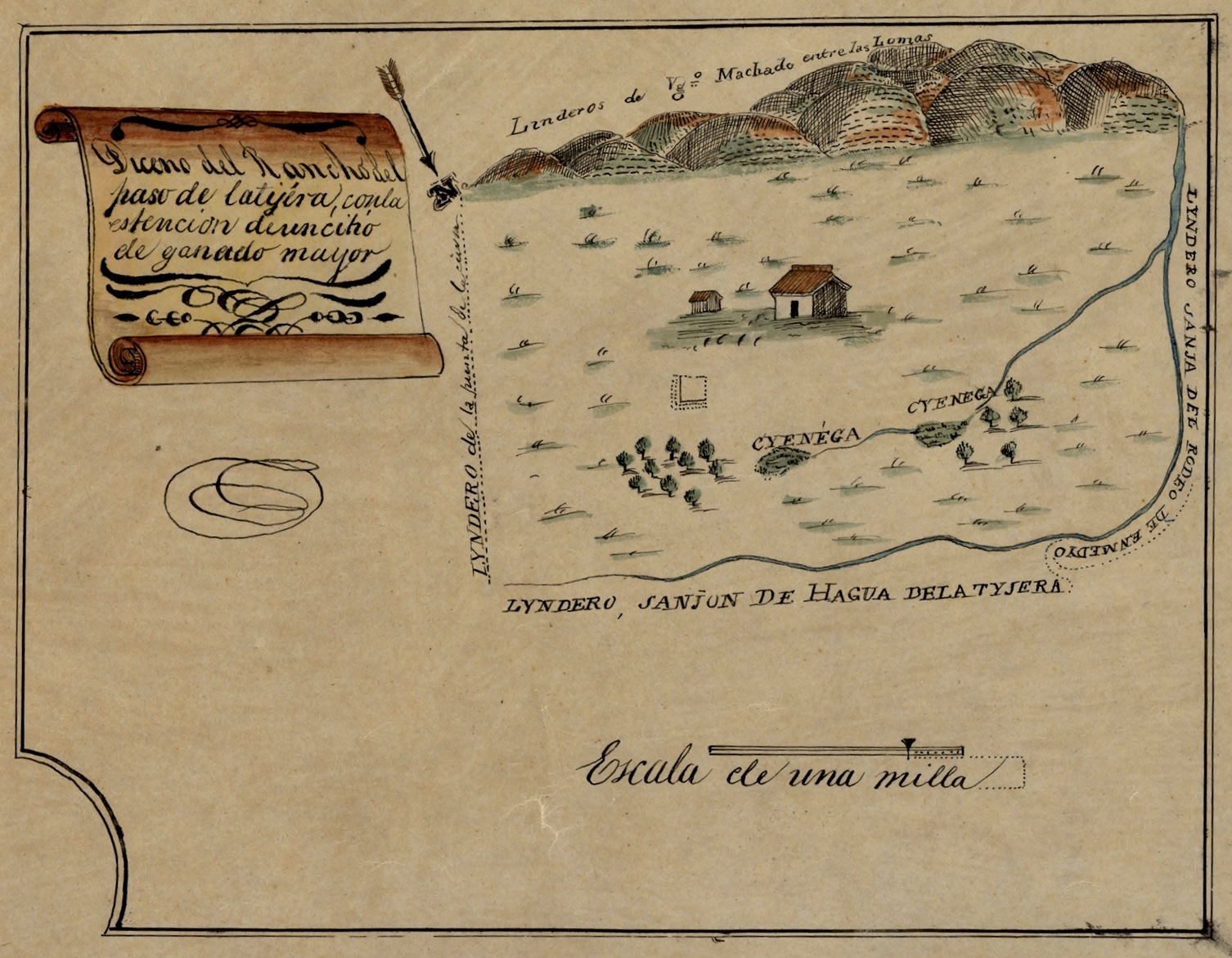
Diseño del Rancho La Ciénega ó Paso de la Tijera (Los Angeles County, California)

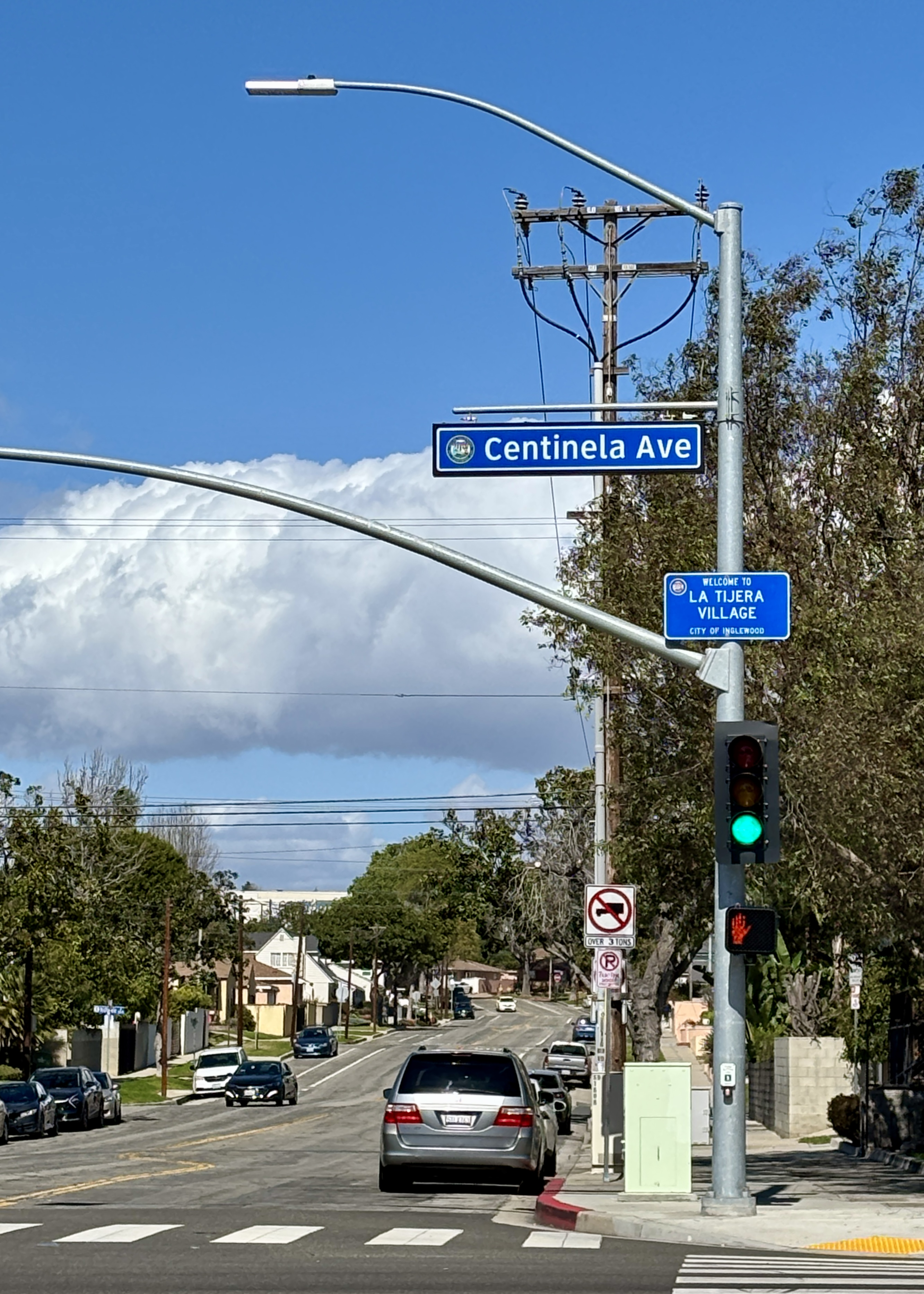
La Tijera Boulevard and the La Tijera Village neighborhood of Inglewood, California take their names from the Rancho

Rancho La Ciénega ó Paso de la Tijera was a 4,219-acre (17.07 km^{2}) Mexican land grant in present day Los Angeles County, California, given in 1843 by Governor Manuel Micheltorena to Vicente Sánchez. "La Cienega" is derived from the Spanish word ciénega, which means swamp or marshland and refers to the natural springs and wetlands in the area between Beverly Hills and Park La Brea and the Baldwin Hills range.

"Paso de la Tijera" appears in c. 1860 maps where a path crosses a stream, at today's intersection of Crenshaw Blvd. and Martin Luther King Jr. Blvd. Some sources say the term means "Pass of the Scissors" and was used by Spanish settlers to describe a pass through the Baldwin Hills which resembled an open pair of scissors, though another (Marinacci) says that "tijera" almost always means "drainage ditch" in old land descriptions.

The Los Angeles River historically changed course occasionally, and flowed to join Ballona Creek in the rancho and into the Santa Monica Bay until 1825, when it returned to its course to San Pedro Bay through Rancho San Pedro. Rancho Las Cienegas was to the north, and Rancho Rincon de los Bueyes to the west also in the Baldwin Hills. The rancho was east of La Cienega Boulevard and south Exposition Boulevard and includes present day Baldwin Hills district, Leimert Park, Ladera Heights, and Windsor Hills.

== History ==
The one square league land grant was made in 1843 by Micheltorena to Vicente Sanchez. Vicente Sanchez (1785–1846) was alcalde of Los Angeles in 1831–1832 and 1845.

After Vicente Sanchez's death in 1846, his widow Maria Victoria Higuera and grandson Tomás Sánchez Ávila Tomás Ávila Sánchez inherited the rancho.

With the cession of California to the United States following the Mexican-American War, the 1848 Treaty of Guadalupe Hidalgo provided that the land grants would be honored. As required by the Land Act of 1851, a claim for Rancho La Ciénega ó Paso de la Tijera was filed with the Public Land Commission in 1852, and the grant was patented to Tomás Sánchez Ávila in 1873.

Tomás Sánchez Ávila lived on the property belonging to his wife, Maria Sepulveda Sanchez, who owned part of Rancho San Rafael. In 1875, Tomás Ávila Sánchez sold Rancho La Cienega o Paso de la Tijera to Francis Pliney Fisk (F.P.F) Temple, Arthur J. Hutchinson, Henry Ledyard and Daniel Freeman. However, Temple experienced financial difficulties and in 1875 Elias J. (Lucky) Baldwin acquired the rancho, giving his name to the hills that dominated the western section of the rancho and thereafter known as the Baldwin Hills. Baldwin used the ranch primarily as a sheep pasture but it was not profitable. When Baldwin died 1909, his daughter Anita M. Baldwin realized that there was oil on the estate, and by 1916 drilling had begun.

== Historic sites of the Rancho ==
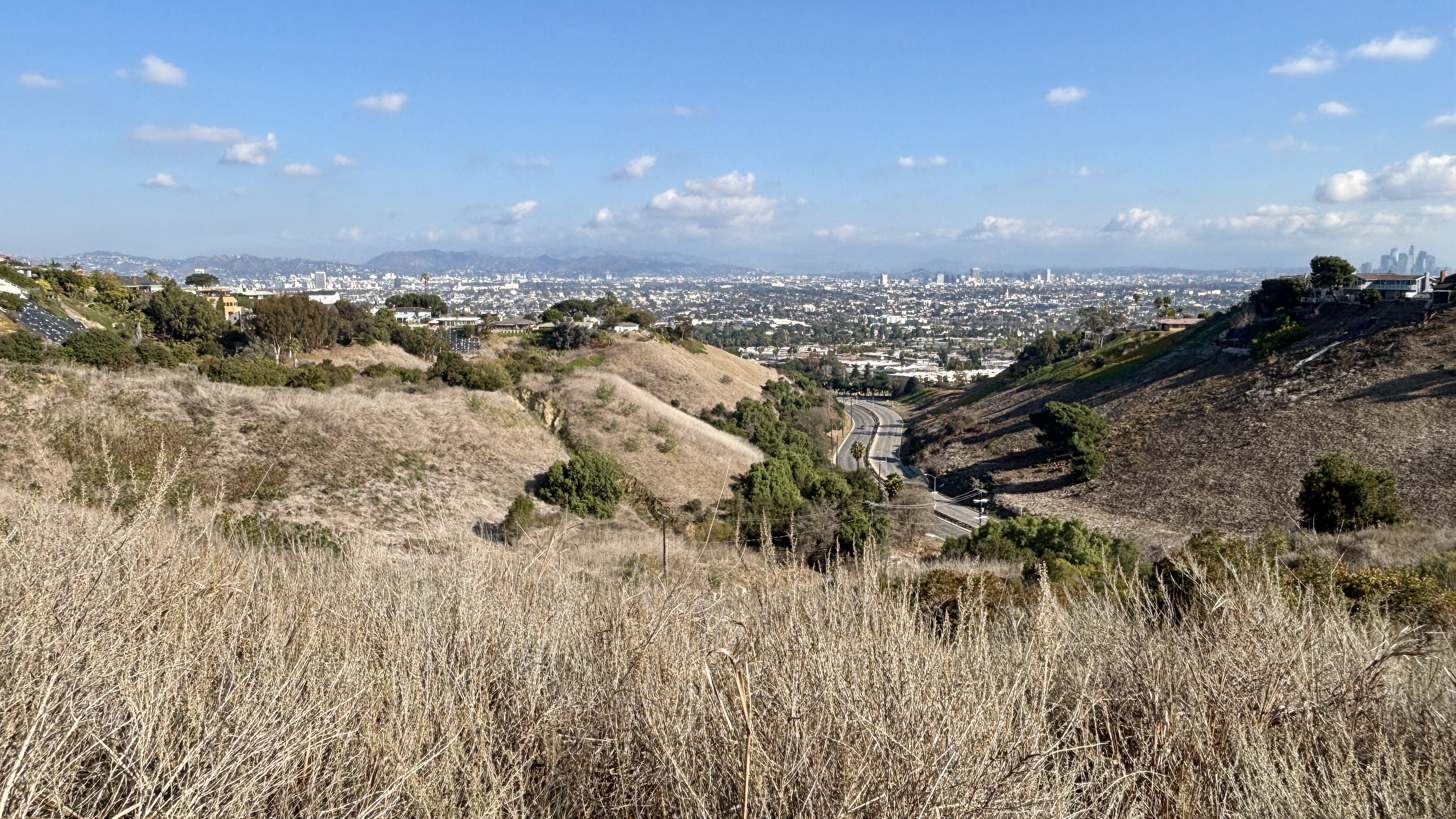
La Cienega canyon through the Baldwin Hills, looking north to the Santa Monica Mountains from Kenneth Hahn State Recreation Area (2025)

- Sanchez Adobe de Rancho La Cienega o Paso de la Tijera. The adobes, with thick walls and high, redwood-beamed ceilings, were once the center of the rancho. In the 1920s, an addition was built linking the structures and the building was converted into a larger clubhouse by the Sunset Golf Course. The oldest part of the structure may have been built in the 1790s, which would make it the oldest surviving structures in the city of Los Angeles. It was declared a Los Angeles historic-cultural monument in 1990.
- Kenneth Hahn State Regional Park and the Park to Playa Trail preserve the rancho's remaining open lands and native habitats in the Baldwin Hills.

== See also ==
- Ranchos of California
- List of Ranchos of California
- List of rancho land grants in Los Angeles County, California
