= Rancho Rincon del Diablo =

Mexican land grant in California

- Former Land Grant
- Etymology: The Devil's Corner
- Interactive map of Rancho Rincon del Diablo
- Coordinates: 33.110°N 117.060°W
- Country: United States
- State: California
- County: San Diego
- Land Grant Established: 1843
- Founder: Juan Bautista Alvarado

Area
  - Total: 12,653 acres (5,120 ha)
- Time zone: UTC−08:00 (Pacific)
  - Summer (DST): UTC−07:00 (Pacific Daylight Time)

Rancho Rincon del Diablo was a 12,653-acre (51.20 km^{2}) Mexican land grant in present-day San Diego County, California, given in 1843 to Juan Bautista Alvarado. The name means "the devil's corner" or "the devil's lurking place". The rancho lands include the present day city of Escondido and Rincon Del Diablo.

== History ==
Alvarado, a native of San Diego, received the three square league Rancho as a land grant after the area fell from the auspice of Mission San Diego de Alcalá. Alvarado, built a large adobe house overlooking Escondido and raised cattle on his land. Both Juan Bautista Alvarado and his wife died in the early 1850s.

With the cession of California to the United States following the Mexican–American War, the 1848 Treaty of Guadalupe Hidalgo provided that the land grants would be honored. As required by the Land Act of 1851, a claim for Rancho Rincon del Diablo was filed with the Public Land Commission in 1852, and the grant was patented to the heirs of Juan B. Alvarado in 1872.

The Alvarado children did not want to settle in the area and each sold their shares of the rancho to a San Diego judge named Oliver S. Witherby. It took him about a decade to acquire all of the land. He farmed extensively and increased the size of his cattle and sheep herds. In the early 1860s Witherby began mining gold on his property and formed the Rincon del Diablo and Escondido Mining Company.

By 1868, Witherby was already short of money and sold his Rancho to Edward McGeary and the three Wolfskill brothers. They changed the predominantly cattle ranch into a sheep ranch with John Wolfskill as the resident manager. For many years a part of the Escondido Valley was known as Wolfskill Plains. During their 15-year ownership the size of the rancho was increased to 12,813 acres (51.85 km^{2}) by the purchase of a "squatter's" 160 acres (0.65 km^{2}).

In 1883, a group formed the Stockton Company and purchased Rancho Rincon del Diablo. A year later these landowners transferred their interest in the valley to the Escondido Company. They planted a large vineyard of Muscat grapes that required little irrigation.

The Escondido Company's ownership of the valley did not last long. In 1886 they deeded the area to the Escondido Land & Town Company, which set to work subdividing the land and planting more vineyards and citrus groves.
