= Rancho Las Ciénegas =

Mexican land grant in California

Coordinates: 34.050°N 118.350°W

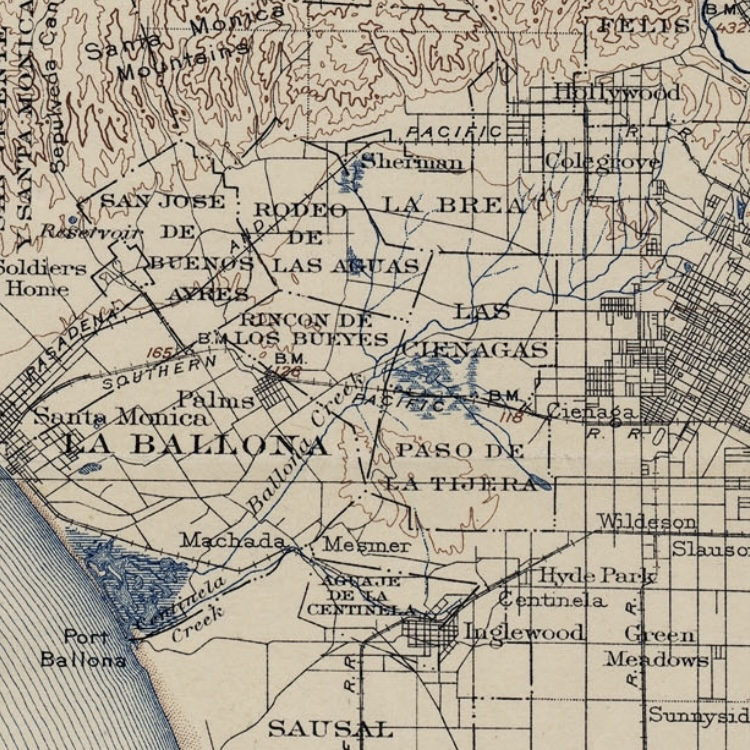
Las Ciénegas mapped in 1900

Rancho Las Ciénegas was a 4,439-acre (17.96 km^{2}) Mexican land grant in present-day Los Angeles County, California, given in 1823 to Francisco Avila by Governor Luis Antonio Argüello. "La Ciénega" is derived from the Spanish word ciénega, which means swamp or marshland and refers to the natural springs and wetlands in the area between the Baldwin Hills range and Baldwin Hills district, and Beverly Hills. The rancho was north of Rancho La Ciénega ó Paso de la Tijera and east of present-day La Cienega Boulevard between Wilshire Boulevard and Jefferson Boulevard. The Los Angeles River would periodically change course historically, and flowed westerly through the rancho's lowlands to Ballona Creek and Santa Monica Bay until 1825, when it returned to the southerly course through Rancho San Pedro to San Pedro Bay.

== History ==
Francisco Avila (1772–1832), one of several sons of Cornelio Avila, was a native of Sonora y Sinaloa, New Spain-Mexico. Francisco Avila came to the Pueblo de Los Angeles in Las Californias sometime after 1794. In 1810, Francisco Avila became alcalde of Los Angeles. In 1823, the new Mexican government granted him Rancho Las Cienegas in Alta California, approximately seven miles west of the pueblo. Avila grazed cattle here and turned it into a profitable venture. Francisco Avila died in 1832.

With the cession of California to the United States following the Mexican-American War, the 1848 Treaty of Guadalupe Hidalgo provided that the land grants would be honored. As required by the Land Act of 1851, a claim for Rancho Las Cienegas was filed with the Public Land Commission in 1853, and the grant was patented to his four children (Januario Avila, Pedra Avila de Ramirez, Francisca Avila de Rimpau, and Louisa Avila de Garfias) in 1871.

A partition suit in 1866 resulted in Januario Avila, 1/5 share, Francisca Avila de Rimpau 1/5 share, Henry H Gird 1/5 share, and the remaining 2/5 share between 10 people.

Januario Avila, owned the north east section of the rancho, including the land that was to become Victoria Park. Francisca Avila married Theodore Rimpau, a native of Germany. In the 1920s, Theodore's sons Adolf, Benjamin and Fred formed Rimpau Brothers Realty on Pico Boulevard and subdivided their part of Rancho Las Cienegas. Henry H Gird purchased nearly 1,000-acre (4.0 km^{2}) of Rancho Las Cienegas in 1862, and lived there until 1880, when Gird sold and moved his family to Rancho Monserate in San Diego County. Luisa Avila, the daughter of Francisco and María Encarnación Sepúlveda Avila married Manuel Garfias owner of Rancho San Pascual.

== See also ==
- Miracle Mile, Los Angeles
- Ranchos of California
- List of Ranchos of California
