= Rancho Buena Vista =

Mexican land grant in California

- Former Land Grant
- Etymology: Good view
- Interactive map of Rancho Buena Vista
- Coordinates: 33.200°N 117.230°W
- Country: United States
- State: California
- County: San Diego
- Land Grant Established: 1845
- Founder: Felipe Subria

Area
  - Total: 2,288 acres (926 ha)
- Time zone: UTC−08:00 (Pacific)
  - Summer (DST): UTC−07:00 (Pacific Daylight Time)

Rancho Buena Vista was a 2,288-acre (9.26 km^{2}) Mexican land grant in present-day San Diego County, California, given in 1845 by Governor Pío Pico to Felipe, an Indian. The name means "good view" in Spanish. The grant was south of San Luis Rey River and Rancho Monserate and encompassed present day Vista.

== History ==
Formerly a part of Mission San Luis Rey lands, the grant was made to Felipe Subria, a mission Indian. His daughter Maria La Garcia, who married William B. Dunn, inherited the property, and then sold it to Jesus Machado.

With the cession of California to the United States following the Mexican-American War, the 1848 Treaty of Guadalupe Hidalgo provided that the land grants would be honored. As required by the Land Act of 1851, a claim was filed with the Public Land Commission in 1853, and the grant was patented to Jesús Machado.

Jesús Machado (1823-?) in 1850 married Lugarda Osuna de Alvarado, whose husband, José María Alvarado, had been killed in the Pauma Massacre. When Jesús Machado was killed by Indians, his son, Luis G. Machado, inherited the rancho. Lorenzo Soto acquired the rancho from foreclosure in 1860. Lorenzo Soto (1821–1863) was the son of Francisco Soto of Rancho San Lorenzo Baja. Soto married María Ygnacia Morena after his first wife died in 1857. After Lorenzo Soto's death, his wife married Tomas Alvarado of Rancho Monserate. They then sold the Rancho to Cave Johnson Couts in 1866.

Couts (1821–1874) was a native of Tennessee, and was a nephew of Cave Johnson. Couts graduated from West Point in 1843 and came to California in 1849 as a lieutenant with the US Army forces occupying California following the Mexican–American War. Couts left the Army, and settled in San Diego. In 1849 he was commissioned to survey and map the pueblo lands of San Diego. He married Ysidora Bandini, the daughter of Juan Bandini, in 1851. Couts began buying property and developing political influence in the area. Couts also owned Rancho Guajome and Rancho Vallecitos de San Marcos. Having been appointed sub-agent for the San Luis Rey Indians in 1853, Couts employed Indian labor to improve the properties. After Couts died, his son, Cave J. Couts Jr.(1856–1943), took over management of the rancho.

In 1874 Couts’ widow, Ysidora Bandini, gave Rancho Buena Vista to their daughter, Maria Antonia, who had married Chalmers Scott, as a wedding gift. Scott moved to San Diego and Maria Antonia gave Rancho Buena Vista to her sister, Ysidora, who had married George Fuller.

== Historic sites of the Rancho ==
- Rancho Buena Vista Adobe.
