= Judges of the Plains =

Judges of the Plains, originally the judicial official Spanish and later Mexican officials called the Jueces del Campo, were judges that decided all disputes over ownership of cattle, horses, and other livestock. They attended all the yearly roundups and branding of cattle (rodeos), and horses (recogidas), where their decisions were final, with no appeal. The Juez del Campo was also a law enforcement officer in cases of theft of livestock, fraudulent brands or certificates of ownership. The laws concerning livestock were mostly traditional, handed down from decisions established during the Spanish Empire in the Americas and from Spain before that. The office was held for a year and was unpaid, taken up for the honor, usually by landowners with large holdings in the district.

The office renamed Judge of the Plains, by the American settlers, was adopted in the Texas Republic and later in the territories acquired in 1848, by the United States during the Mexican–American War with large populations of former Mexican citizens. Texas and the states formed from those territories: California, New Mexico and Arizona, retained that office and formalized it in their civil code. California did so in CHAPTER CLXVI. AN ACT concerning Judges of the Plains (Jueces del Carnpo,) and defining their Duties. California formalized the office in April 1851 and it was retained into the 20th century.
