= Rancho Monserate =

Mexican land grant in California

- Former Mexican land grant
- Location within California
- Coordinates: 33.321°N 117.197°W
- Country: United States
- State: California
- County: San Diego
- Granted: 1846
- Founder: Ysidro María Alvarado

Area
  - Total: 13,323 acres (5,392 ha)
- Elevation: 397 ft (121 m)
- Time zone: UTC−8 (PST)
  - Summer (DST): UTC−7 (PDT)

Rancho Monserate was a 13,323-acre (53.92 km^{2}) Mexican land grant in present-day San Diego County, California, given in 1846 by Governor Pío Pico to Ysidro María Alvarado. The grant extended south and east of the present day Fallbrook down to the San Luis Rey River. The grant was bounded on the west by Pico's Rancho Santa Margarita y Las Flores.

== History ==
Ysidro María Alvarado (1811–1863), son of Francisco Xavier Alvarado (1766–1831) and Maria Ygnacia Amador (1770–1851), married Maria Micaela Avila (1816–1845) in Los Angeles, California. Shortly after bearing three children, Micaela died from unknown causes, and Alvarado married her sister Manuela Lorenzo Avila.

With the cession of California to the United States following the Mexican-American War, the 1848 Treaty of Guadalupe Hidalgo provided that the land grants would be honored. As required by the Land Act of 1851, a claim for Rancho Monserate was filed with the Public Land Commission in 1853, and the grant was patented to Ysidro María Alvarado on July 17, 1872.

=== Smallpox deaths ===
A smallpox epidemic began in Mission San Juan Capistrano in 1862 and appeared to be spreading south toward San Diego. To keep them safe, Alvarado sent his children to Los Angeles to stay with their uncle, Francisco Avila. The disease raged through the rancho, killing Ysidro Alvarado and his wife in 1863 along with 21 ranch hands and domestic servants. After a number of smallpox victims were interred at Mission San Luis Rey, Colonel Cave Johnson Couts of Rancho Guajome, at that time owner of the mission grounds, made it known that he would not allow any further burials. However, on January 13, 1863, the family and friends of Ysidro Alvarado chose to honor his dying wish and bury him at the mission graveyard. Tomas Alvarado, present at the ceremony, wrote that, as dirt was being thrown on the casket of Ysidro Alvarado, Couts's brother William Blount Couts and two of his trusted men challenged the mourners from the wall of the graveyard, holding guns and shouting "Como diputado del Sherif del condado, no es permitido que este Señor se entierra aqui" ("As deputy of the sheriff of the county, [I say] it is not permitted to bury this man here.") William was aiming a double-barreled shotgun at them, and Leon Vasquez of the burial party picked up a shovel and ran toward the threat. William fired one barrel and missed Vasquez. As Vasquez jumped onto the wall, William shot him in the face and killed him. The rest of the unarmed burial party scattered in fear of their lives as more shots were fired at them, wounding two. Colonel Couts explained the incident the next day, saying "In avoiding the loathsome disease now infesting our community, we have had to resort to arms, resulting in the killing of one man." He defended his brother's actions, writing to his lawyer that Vasquez "is really not worth noticing ... He is known as a bad character." William Blount Couts was charged with murder but, despite depositions from eight eyewitnesses, succeeded in having the charges dropped because of paperwork technicalities.

=== Heirs ===
After the smallpox deaths in 1863 the rancho passed to Alvarado's minor heirs: Tomas Alvarado, Dolores Alvarado de Serrano and Lugarda Alvarado de Palomares. The U.S. Land Commission had not yet established ownership, so the home was rented to Simon Goldbaum, who used the building as a general store. A number of settlers moved into the eastern portion of the rancho, and a school and post office were built. Following the award of the U.S. patent in 1872, the rancho was partitioned three ways in 1874; each section being approximately 4,500 acres (18 km^{2}).

Tomas Alvarado was born on Main Street in Los Angeles on December 21, 1841, and married María Ygnacia Morena, the widow of Lorenzo Soto, on June 4, 1864. He received the eastern third of Rancho Monserate in 1874 and built an adobe chapel and a hacienda on the south side of San Luis Rey River. There, the family raised six daughters and one son. Today, the adobe chapel is the only remaining structure from that time period. It has been restored with the combined efforts of the Fallbrook Financial Corporation, the San Diego Historical Society, the County of San Diego and the Rancho Monserate Country Club.

Dolores Alvarado de Serrano (born 1838) and her husband received the middle third of Rancho Monserate, and built an adobe home in the south part of what is now known as Live Oak Canyon east of Fallbrook. In 1880, Henry Harrison Gird sold his Rancho Las Cienegas holdings and purchased the Serrano ranch. The Gird family lived in the Serrano home until a flood in 1883 turned the long central hallway into a stream, after which they commissioned a wood-frame home to be built on a nearby knoll. Henry and Martha Gird lived there until their natural deaths in 1913 at the ages of 87 and 86.

María Lugarda de Jesús Alvarado (born 1842) married Francisco Palomares (born 1840) of Rancho San Jose in 1866 in Los Angeles. She received the western third of Rancho Monserate, which is closest to Fallbrook. Rather than relocating, she leased the land to R. Turnbull. In 1885 Lugarda Alvarado de Palomares authorized her son-in-law Henry Avila, husband of her daughter Concepcion, to collect rents and profits from the Palomares Ranch so that he could establish a trust for her unmarried daughter and minor children. After a few years, Avila built a house on the northern boundary of the Palomares Ranch, next to Stage Coach Lane.

== See also ==
- Ranchos of California
- List of Ranchos of California
- Population of Native California - epidemics
