= Naval Hospital Santa Margarita Ranch =

Naval Hospital in California

- San Diego County, California, U.S.
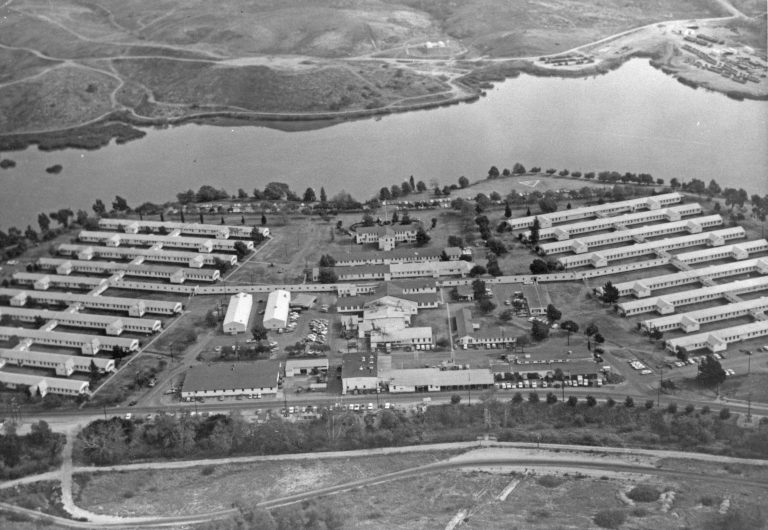
- Naval Hospital Santa Margarita Ranch at Lake O'Neill in 1943

- Shown within San Diego County, California

Site information
- Type: Former military naval hospital
- Controlled by: US Navy

Location
- Coordinates: 33.330886°N 117.324722°W

Site history
- Built: September 1943
- In use: September 1943 – 1971

Naval Hospital Santa Margarita Ranch was a large US Navy hospital facility in Oceanside, California. Located on Camp Pendleton in Camp Pendleton South, California in San Diego County. Naval Hospital Santa Margarita Ranch was the first naval hospital in the area that opened in 1943 to support World War II wounded. Built on Rancho Santa Margarita y Las Flores, near the training Center's Lake O'Neill with 1,228 beds. In 1945 the hospital expanded to 1,584 beds. In 1950 the hospital was renamed Naval Hospital Camp Joseph H. Pendleton, Oceanside. The hospital was renamed a few times before being given its current name, Naval Hospital Camp Pendleton, in 1967. The 1943 hospital was built quickly, composed of 76 temporary, wood-frame buildings at first with 600 beds and opened on September 3, 1943. The hospital and support building were on 252 acres. Post war, in 1946 the hospital was reduced to 920 beds. In 1971 construction started on a new eight-story hospital, the new hospital opened in December 1974. The 1974 hospital was replaced with the current hospital in 2014. The site of the original Naval Hospital Santa Margarita Ranch is now: Lake O'Neill Campground, Camp Pendleton Youth Sports, O'Neill Fitness Center, Wounded Warrior Battalion West and the Camp Pendleton Fire Department Station 4.

Naval Hospital Camp Pendleton, which replaced Naval Hospital Santa Margarita Ranch is the current hospital that operates in a 500,000-square-foot, four-story building that opened on January 31, 2014. The new complex was completed under the American Recovery and Reinvestment Act of 2009. A groundbreaking ceremony was held on December 2, 2010, and construction completed on October 17, 2013. The hospital is part of the US Military Health System. The hospital has 150 beds and was built under the Naval Facilities Engineering Command. Naval Hospital Camp Pendleton operates branch clinics in the Southern California area. Naval Hospital Camp Pendleton has a 26-bed emergency center, primary care, intensive care, care for active-duty military, veterans and their families. Other services include: nine operating rooms, six imaging rooms, labor and delivery program. The parking structure has a large solar energy system.

== See also ==
- California during World War II
- American Theater (1939–1945)
- United States home front during World War II
- DeWitt General Hospital
