= Camp Pendleton Mainside, California =

Camp Pendleton Mainside
- census-designated place
- Location in San Diego County and the state of California

- Location in the United States
- Coordinates: 33°18′18″N 117°18′22″W
- Country: United States
- State: California
- County: San Diego

Area
  - Total: 10.950 sq mi (28.360 km^{2})
  - Land: 10.747 sq mi (27.835 km^{2})
  - Water: 0.203 sq mi (0.525 km^{2}) 1.85%

Population (2020)
  - Total: 9,683
  - Density: 901.0/sq mi (347.9/km^{2})
- Time zone: UTC-8 (PST)
  - Summer (DST): UTC-7 (PDT)
- ZIP code: 92055
- Area codes: 442/760
- FIPS code: 06-10559
- GNIS feature ID: 2407946

Camp Pendleton Mainside is a census-designated place (CDP) in San Diego County, California, located at the southeast corner of Marine Corps Base Camp Pendleton. Per the 2020 census, the population was 9,683. It was formerly known as Camp Pendleton North, but its name was changed for the 2020 Census. Along with Camp Pendleton South, it is one of two CDPs located on the base.

== Geography ==
Camp Pendleton Mainside is located at 33°18′18″N 117°18′22″W (33.304869, −117.306125).

According to the United States Census Bureau, the CDP has a total area of 10.95 square miles (28.4 km^{2}). 10.75 square miles (27.8 km^{2}) of it is land and 0.20 square miles (0.52 km^{2}) of it (1.85%) is water.

== Demographics ==
Historical population
Census	Pop.	Note	%±
1970	11,803		—
1980	2,065		−82.5%
1990	10,373		402.3%
2000	8,197		−21.0%
2010	5,200		−36.6%
2020	9,683		86.2%
U.S. Decennial Census; 1860–1870 1880-1890; 1900 1910 1920; 1930 1940 1950; 1960 1970 1980; 1990 2000 2010; 2020 known as Camp Pendleton North prior to 2020

Camp Pendleton Mainside first appeared as a census designated place under the name Camp Pendleton North in the 1970 U.S. census. The name was changed to Camp Pendleton Mainside prior to the 2020 U.S. census.

=== Racial and ethnic composition ===
Camp Pendleton Mainside CDP, California – Racial and ethnic composition Note: the US Census treats Hispanic/Latino as an ethnic category. This table excludes Latinos from the racial categories and assigns them to a separate category. Hispanics/Latinos may be of any race.
Race / Ethnicity (NH = Non-Hispanic)	Pop 2000	Pop 2010	Pop 2020	% 2000	% 2010	% 2020
White alone (NH)	4,886	3,047	4,920	59.61%	58.60%	50.81%
Black or African American alone (NH)	848	461	990	10.35%	8.87%	10.22%
Native American or Alaska Native alone (NH)	102	72	97	1.24%	1.38%	1.00%
Asian alone (NH)	223	143	387	2.72%	2.75%	4.00%
Native Hawaiian or Pacific Islander alone (NH)	24	78	112	0.29%	1.50%	1.16%
Other race alone (NH)	14	9	19	0.17%	0.17%	0.20%
Mixed race or Multiracial (NH)	246	233	253	3.00%	4.48%	2.61%
Hispanic or Latino (any race)	1,854	1,157	2,905	22.62%	22.25%	30.00%
Total	8,197	5,200	9,683	100.00%	100.00%	100.00%

=== 2020 census ===
As of the 2020 census, Camp Pendleton Mainside had a population of 9,683 and a population density of 901.0 inhabitants per square mile (347.9/km^{2}).

The age distribution was 11.1% under the age of 18, 67.2% aged 18 to 24, 19.8% aged 25 to 44, 1.1% aged 45 to 64, and 0.8% aged 65 or older. The median age was 21.9 years. For every 100 females there were 308.2 males, and for every 100 females age 18 and over there were 360.7 males.

The census reported that 28.3% of the population lived in households, 69.2% lived in non-institutionalized group quarters, and 2.5% were institutionalized. 97.8% of residents lived in urban areas, while 2.2% lived in rural areas.

There were 841 households, of which 65.8% had children under the age of 18 living in them. Of all households, 88.2% were married-couple households, 0.7% were cohabiting-couple households, 4.4% had a male householder with no spouse or partner present, and 6.7% had a female householder with no spouse or partner present. About 4.2% of all households were made up of individuals and 0.1% had someone living alone who was 65 years of age or older. The average household size was 3.26, and there were 796 families (94.6% of all households).

There were 1,150 housing units at an average density of 107.0 units per square mile (41.3 units/km^{2}), of which 26.9% were vacant and 73.1% were occupied. Of the occupied units, 0.7% were owner-occupied and 99.3% were occupied by renters. The homeowner vacancy rate was 0.0% and the rental vacancy rate was 23.2%.

=== Income and poverty ===
In 2023, the US Census Bureau estimated that the median household income was $56,250, and the per capita income was $23,953. About 11.9% of families and 10.7% of the population were below the poverty line.

=== 2010 census ===
At the 2010 census Camp Pendleton North had a population of 5,200. The population density was 574.2 inhabitants per square mile (221.7/km^{2}). The racial makeup of Camp Pendleton North was 3,730 (71.7%) White, 501 (9.6%) African American, 83 (1.6%) Native American, 151 (2.9%) Asian, 80 (1.5%) Pacific Islander, 305 (5.9%) from other races, and 350 (6.7%) from two or more races. Hispanic or Latino of any race were 1,157 persons (22.3%).

The census reported that 3,561 people (68.5% of the population) lived in households, 1,627 (31.3%) lived in non-institutionalized group quarters, and 12 (0.2%) were institutionalized.

There were 1,069 households, 817 (76.4%) had children under the age of 18 living in them, 921 (86.2%) were opposite-sex married couples living together, 104 (9.7%) had a female householder with no husband present, 13 (1.2%) had a male householder with no wife present. There were 7 (0.7%) unmarried opposite-sex partnerships, and 5 (0.5%) same-sex married couples or partnerships. 29 households (2.7%) were one person and 1 (0.1%) had someone living alone who was 65 or older. The average household size was 3.33. There were 1,038 families (97.1% of households); the average family size was 3.39.

The age distribution was 1,502 people (28.9%) under the age of 18, 2,376 people (45.7%) aged 18 to 24, 1,235 people (23.8%) aged 25 to 44, 76 people (1.5%) aged 45 to 64, and 11 people (0.2%) who were 65 or older. The median age was 21.3 years. For every 100 females, there were 177.6 males. For every 100 females age 18 and over, there were 218.2 males.

There were 1,259 housing units at an average density of 139.0 per square mile, of the occupied units 16 (1.5%) were owner-occupied and 1,053 (98.5%) were rented. The homeowner vacancy rate was 0%; the rental vacancy rate was 15.2%. 49 people (0.9% of the population) lived in owner-occupied housing units and 3,512 people (67.5%) lived in rental housing units.

== Government ==
In the California State Legislature, Camp Pendleton Mainside is in the 38th senatorial district, represented by Democrat Catherine Blakespear, and in the 74th Assembly district, represented by Republican Laurie Davies.

In the United States House of Representatives, Camp Pendleton Mainside is in California's 49th congressional district, represented by Democrat Mike Levin.

== Education ==
The CDP is mostly in the Fallbrook Union Elementary School District and the Fallbrook Union High School District. A piece of the CDP is in the Oceanside Unified School District. The Camp Pendleton property does not have any Department of Defense Education Activity (DoDEA) schools. The Fallbrook HSD operates Fallbrook High School. OUSD on-post properties of Marine Corps Base Camp Pendleton are assigned to Oceanside High School.

== See also ==
- Camp Pendleton South CDP
