= California's 49th congressional district =

U.S. House district for California

Coordinates: 33.4°N 117.1°W

- Interactive map of district boundaries
- Representative: Mike Levin; D–San Juan Capistrano
- Population (2025): 744,152
- Median household income: $131,657
- Ethnicity: 57.9% White; 27.2% Hispanic; 6.4% Asian; 5.2% Two or more races; 2.1% Black; 1.3% other
- Cook PVI: D+4

California's 49th congressional district is a congressional district in the U.S. state of California. The district is represented by Mike Levin.

The district currently covers the northern coastal areas of San Diego County, including Oceanside, Vista, Carlsbad, Encinitas, Solana Beach and parts of Del Mar as well as a portion of southern Orange County, including San Clemente, Dana Point, San Juan Capistrano, Ladera Ranch, Laguna Niguel and Rancho Mission Viejo. Marine Corps Base Camp Pendleton is in the district.

In the 2016 election, Darrell Issa won by a margin of less than 1%. In the 2018 election, this district was considered to be a major battleground. Rep. Issa announced that he would not seek reelection. Following the November 6, 2018, election, Democrat Mike Levin became the district's congressman.

== Recent election results from statewide races ==
=== 2023–2027 boundaries ===
Year	Office	Results
2008	President	Obama 49.90% - 49.86%
2010	Governor	Whitman 57% - 37%
2010	Lt. Governor	Maldonado 49% - 38%
2010	Secretary of State	Dunn 54% - 39%
2010	Attorney General	Cooley 59% - 32%
2010	Treasurer	Walters 53% - 40%
2010	Controller	Strickland 51% - 41%
2012	President	Romney 53% - 45%
2014	Governor	Kashkari 56% - 44%
2016	President	Clinton 50% - 44%
2018	Governor	Newsom 51% - 49%
2018	Attorney General	Becerra 52% - 48%
2020	President	Biden 55% - 43%
2022	Senate (Reg.)	Padilla 52% - 48%
2022	Governor	Newsom 50.4% - 49.6%
2022	Lt. Governor	Kounalakis 51% - 49%
2022	Secretary of State	Weber 51% - 49%
2022	Attorney General	Bonta 50.1% - 49.9%
2022	Treasurer	Guerrero 50.2% - 49.8%
2022	Controller	Chen 53% - 47%
2024	President	Harris 52% - 45%
2024	Senate (Reg.)	Schiff 51% - 49%

=== 2027–2033 boundaries ===
Year	Office	Results
2008	President	Obama 49.90% - 49.86%
2010	Governor	Brown 57% - 37%
2010	Lt. Governor	Newsom 49% - 38%
2010	Secretary of State	Bowen 54% - 39%
2010	Attorney General	Harris 59% - 32%
2010	Treasurer	Lockyer 53% - 40%
2010	Controller	Chiang 51% - 41%
2012	President	Obama 53% - 45%
2014	Governor	Brown 56% - 44%
2016	President	Clinton 50% - 44%
2018	Governor	Newsom 51% - 49%
2018	Attorney General	Becerra 52% - 48%
2020	President	Biden 55% - 43%
2022	Senate (Reg.)	Padilla 52% - 48%
2022	Governor	Newsom 50.4% - 49.6%
2022	Lt. Governor	Kounalakis 51% - 49%
2022	Secretary of State	Weber 51% - 49%
2022	Attorney General	Bonta 50.1% - 49.9%
2022	Treasurer	Ma 50.2% - 49.8%
2022	Controller	Cohen 53% - 47%
2024	President	Harris 52% - 45%
2024	Senate (Reg.)	Schiff 51% - 49%

== Composition ==
FIPS County Code	County	Seat	Population
59	Orange	Santa Ana	3,135,755
73	San Diego	San Diego	3,269,973

Under the 2020 redistricting, California's 49th congressional district is located in Southern California, covering the North County region of San Diego County and southeast Orange County. The area in San Diego County includes the cities of Carlsbad, Oceanside, Encinitas, Solana Beach, Del Mar, and Vista; and the census-designated places Camp Pendleton Mainside and Camp Pendleton South. The area in Orange County includes the cities of San Clemente, San Juan Capistrano, Dana Point, and Laguna Niguel; and the census-designated places Ladera Ranch, Las Flores, and Rancho Mission Viejo.

San Diego County is split between this district, the 48th district and the 50th district. They are partitioned by Gavilan Mountain Rd, Sandia Creek Dr, De Luz Rd, Marine Corps Base Pendleton, Sleeping Indian Rd, Tumbleweed Ln, Del Valle Dr, Highland Oak St, Olive Hill Rd, Via Puerta del Sol, N River Rd, Highway 76, Old River Rd, Little Gopher Canyon Rd, Camino Cantera, Corre Camino, Tierra del Cielo, Elevado Rd, Vista Grande Dr, Warmlands Ave, Queens Way, Canciones del Cielo, Camino Loma Verde, Alessandro Trail, Friendly Dr, Edgehill Rd, Catalina Heights Way, Deeb Ct, Foothill Dr, Clarence Dr, Highway S14, Smilax Rd, Poinsetta Ave, W San Marcos Blvd, Diamond Trail Preserve, S Rancho Santa Rd, San Elijo Rd, Rancho Summitt Dr, Escondido Creek, El Camino del Norte, San Elijo Lagoon, Highland Dr, Avacado Pl, Jimmy Durante Blvd, San Dieguito Dr, 8th St, Nob Ave, Highway S21, and the San Diego Northern Railway.

Orange County is split between this district, the 40th district, and the 47th district. They are partitioned by Alicia Parkway, Pacific Park Dr, San Joaquin Hills Trans Corridor, Cabot Rd, San Diego Freeway, Via Escolar, Arroyo Trabuco Creek, Oso Parkway, Thomas F Riley Wilderness Park, and Ronald W Casper's Wilderness Park, Aliso & Wood Canyons, Vista del Sol, Highway 1, Stonington Rd, Virginia Way, 7th Ave, and Laguna Beach.

=== Cities and CDPs with 10,000 or more people ===
- Oceanside – 174,068
- Carlsbad – 114,746
- Vista – 98,381
- Laguna Niguel – 64,355
- San Clemente – 64,293
- Encinitas – 62,007
- San Juan Capistrano – 35,196
- Dana Point – 33,107
- Ladera Ranch – 26,170
- Solana Beach – 12,941
- Camp Pendleton South – 12,468
- Rancho Mission Viejo – 10,378

=== 2,500 – 10,000 people ===
- Camp Pendleton Mainside – 9,683
- Las Flores – 5,995
- Del Mar – 3,954

== List of members representing the district ==
Member	Party	Dates	Cong ress(es)	Electoral history	Counties
District created January 3, 1993
Lynn Schenk (San Diego)	Democratic	January 3, 1993 – January 3, 1995	103rd	Elected in 1992. Lost re-election.	1993–2003; San Diego (San Diego)
Brian Bilbray (Imperial Beach)	Republican	January 3, 1995 – January 3, 2001	104th 105th 106th	Elected in 1994. Re-elected in 1996. Re-elected in 1998. Lost re-election.	1993–2003; San Diego (San Diego)
Susan Davis (San Diego)	Democratic	January 3, 2001 – January 3, 2003	107th	Elected in 2000. Redistricted to the 53rd district.	1993–2003; San Diego (San Diego)
Darrell Issa (Vista)	Republican	January 3, 2003 – January 3, 2019	108th 109th 110th 111th 112th 113th 114th 115th	Redistricted from the 48th district and re-elected in 2002. Re-elected in 2004. Re-elected in 2006. Re-elected in 2008. Re-elected in 2010. Re-elected in 2012. Re-elected in 2014. Re-elected in 2016. Retired.	2003–2013 Riverside (Temecula); San Diego (Oceanside)
Darrell Issa (Vista)	Republican	January 3, 2003 – January 3, 2019	108th 109th 110th 111th 112th 113th 114th 115th	Redistricted from the 48th district and re-elected in 2002. Re-elected in 2004. Re-elected in 2006. Re-elected in 2008. Re-elected in 2010. Re-elected in 2012. Re-elected in 2014. Re-elected in 2016. Retired.	2013–2023 Southern Orange (Dana Point and San Clemente); Northern San Diego (Carlsbad and Oceanside)
Mike Levin (San Juan Capistrano)	Democratic	January 3, 2019 – present	116th 117th 118th 119th	Elected in 2018. Re-elected in 2020. Re-elected in 2022. Re-elected in 2024. Re-elected in 2026.	2013–2023 Southern Orange (Dana Point and San Clemente); Northern San Diego (Carlsbad and Oceanside)
Mike Levin (San Juan Capistrano)	Democratic	January 3, 2019 – present	116th 117th 118th 119th	Elected in 2018. Re-elected in 2020. Re-elected in 2022. Re-elected in 2024. Re-elected in 2026.	2023–present: Northern coastal portions of San Diego county

== Election results ==
=== 1992 ===
1992 United States House of Representatives elections in California
Party	Candidate	Votes	%
Democratic	Lynn Schenk	127,280	51.1
Republican	Judy Jarvis	106,170	42.7
Libertarian	John Wallner	10,706	4.3
Peace and Freedom	Milton Zaslow	4,738	1.9
Independent	Thompson (write-in)	4	0.0
Total votes		248,898	100.0
Democratic win (new seat)			

=== 1994 ===
1994 United States House of Representatives elections in California
Party	Candidate	Votes	%
Republican	Brian Bilbray	90,283	48.5
Democratic	Lynn Schenk (Incumbent)	85,597	46.0
Libertarian	Chris Hoogenboom	5,288	2.8
Peace and Freedom	Renate Kline	4,948	2.7
Independent	Thompson (write-in)	2	0.0
Total votes		186,118	100.0
Republican gain from Democratic			

=== 1996 ===
1996 United States House of Representatives elections in California
Party	Candidate	Votes	%
Republican	Brian Bilbray (Incumbent)	108,806	52.7
Democratic	Peter Navarro	86,657	41.9
Libertarian	Ernie Lippe	4,218	3.3
Reform	Kevin Hambsch	3,773	1.8
Natural Law	Peter Stirling	3,314	1.6
Total votes		206,768	100.0
Republican hold			

=== 1998 ===
1998 United States House of Representatives elections in California
Party	Candidate	Votes	%
Republican	Brian Bilbray (Incumbent)	90,516	48.8
Democratic	Christine T. Kehoe	86,400	46.6
Libertarian	Ernest Lippe	3,327	1.8
Natural Law	Julia F. Simon	2,829	1.5
Peace and Freedom	Janice Jordan	2,447	1.3
Total votes		185,519	100.0
Republican hold			

=== 2000 ===
2000 United States House of Representatives elections in California
Party	Candidate	Votes	%
Democratic	Susan Davis	113,400	49.7
Republican	Brian Bilbray (Incumbent)	105,515	46.2
Libertarian	Doris Ball	6,526	2.8
Natural Law	Tahir I. Bhatti	3,048	1.3
Total votes		228,489	100.0
Democratic gain from Republican			

=== 2002 ===
2002 United States House of Representatives elections in California
Party	Candidate	Votes	%
Republican	Darrell Issa	94,594	77.3
Libertarian	Karl W. Dietrich	26,891	21.9
Democratic	Michael P. Byron (write-in)	1,012	0.8
Total votes		122,497	100.0
Republican hold			

=== 2004 ===
2004 United States House of Representatives elections in California
Party	Candidate	Votes	%
Republican	Darrell Issa (Incumbent)	141,658	62.6
Democratic	Michael P. Byron	79,057	34.9
Libertarian	Lars R. Grossmith	5,751	2.5
Total votes		226,466	100.0
Republican hold			

=== 2006 ===
2006 United States House of Representatives elections in California
Party	Candidate	Votes	%
Republican	Darrell Issa (Incumbent)	98,891	63.3
Democratic	Jeeni Criscenzo	52,227	33.5
Libertarian	Lars B. Grossmith	4,952	3.2
Total votes		156,070	100.0
Republican hold			

=== 2008 ===
2008 United States House of Representatives elections in California
Party	Candidate	Votes	%
Republican	Darrell Issa (Incumbent)	140,300	58.3
Democratic	Robert Hamilton	90,138	37.5
Libertarian	Lars B. Grossmith	10,232	4.2
Total votes		240,670	100.0
Republican hold			

=== 2010 ===
2010 United States House of Representatives elections in California
Party	Candidate	Votes	%
Republican	Darrell Issa (Incumbent)	119,083	62.8
Democratic	Howard Katz	59,710	31.5
American Independent	Dion Clark	6,585	3.5
Libertarian	Mike Paster	4,290	2.2
Total votes		189,668	100.0
Republican hold			

=== 2012 ===
2012 United States House of Representatives elections in California
Party	Candidate	Votes	%
Republican	Darrell Issa (Incumbent)	159,725	58.2
Democratic	Jerry Tetalman	114,893	41.8
Total votes		274,618	100.0
Republican hold			

=== 2014 ===
2014 United States House of Representatives elections in California
Party	Candidate	Votes	%
Republican	Darrell Issa (Incumbent)	98,161	60.2
Democratic	Dave Peiser	64,981	39.8
Total votes		163,142	100.0
Republican hold			

=== 2016 ===
2016 United States House of Representatives elections in California
Primary election
Party	Candidate	Votes	%
Republican	Darrell Issa (Incumbent)	84,582	50.8
Democratic	Doug Applegate	75,744	45.5
No party preference	Ryan Glenn Wingo	6,079	3.7
Total votes		166,405	100.0
General election
Republican	Darrell Issa (Incumbent)	155,888	50.3
Democratic	Doug Applegate	154,267	49.7
Total votes		310,155	100.0
Republican hold			

=== 2018 ===
2018 United States House of Representatives elections in California
Primary election
Party	Candidate	Votes	%
Republican	Diane Harkey	46,468	25.5
Democratic	Mike Levin	31,850	17.5
Democratic	Sara Jacobs	28,778	15.8
Democratic	Doug Applegate	23,850	13.1
Republican	Kristin Gaspar	15,467	8.5
Republican	Rocky Chávez	13,739	7.5
Democratic	Paul G. Kerr	8,099	4.4
Republican	Brian Maryott	5,496	3.0
Republican	Mike Schmitt	2,379	1.3
Republican	Josh Schoonover	1,362	0.7
Republican	Craig A. Nordal	1,156	0.6
Republican	David Medway	1,066	0.6
No party preference	Robert Pendleton	905	0.5
Green	Danielle St. John	690	0.4
Libertarian	Joshua L. Hancock	552	0.3
Peace and Freedom	Jordan J. Mills	233	0.1
Total votes		182,090	100.0
General election
Democratic	Mike Levin	166,453	56.4
Republican	Diane Harkey	128,577	43.6
Total votes		295,030	100.0
Democratic gain from Republican			

=== 2020 ===
2020 United States House of Representatives elections in California
Party	Candidate	Votes	%
Democratic	Mike Levin (Incumbent)	205,179	53.1
Republican	Brian Maryott	181,027	46.9
Total votes		386,206	100.0
Democratic hold			

=== 2022 ===
2022 United States House of Representatives elections in California
Party	Candidate	Votes	%
Democratic	Mike Levin (Incumbent)	153,541	52.6
Republican	Brian Maryott	138,194	47.4
Total votes		291,735	100.0
Democratic hold			

=== 2024 ===
2024 United States House of Representatives elections in California
Party	Candidate	Votes	%
Democratic	Mike Levin (Incumbent)	197,397	52.2
Republican	Matt Gunderson	180,950	47.8
Total votes		378,347	100.0
Democratic hold			

== Historical district boundaries ==
Before the 2002 redistricting, most of the territory currently located in the district was previously located in the 48th district. The 49th district was located farther south, encompassing most of what is now the 53rd district.

=== 2003–2013 ===
Before the 2012 redistricting the district extended further inland to include a portion of southern Riverside County and most of northern San Diego County.

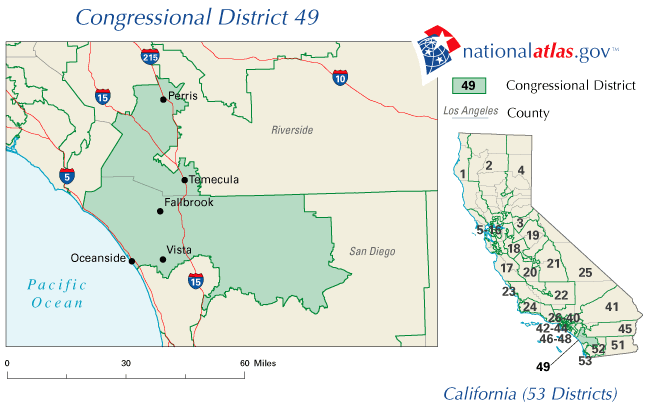

=== 2013–2023 ===
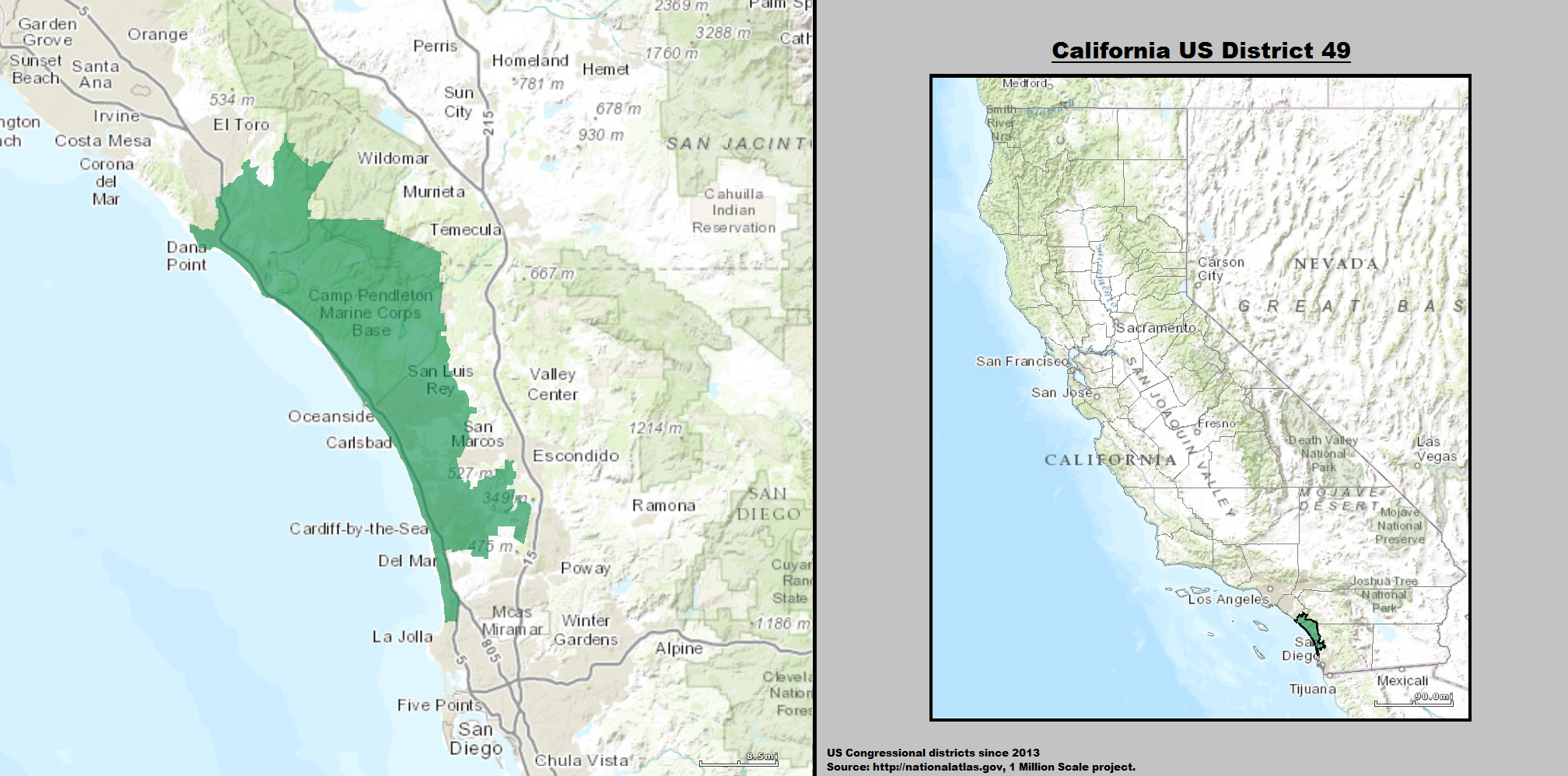

== See also ==
- List of United States congressional districts
- California's congressional districts
