= Naval Hospital Camp Pendleton =

Naval Hospital in California

- San Diego County, California, U.S.
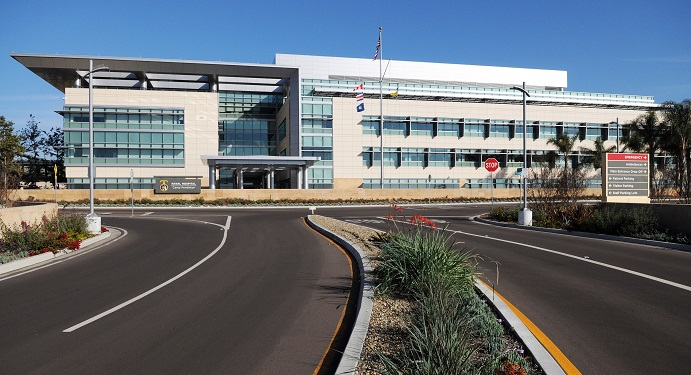
- Naval Hospital Camp Pendleton in 2015

- Shown within San Diego County, California

Site information
- Type: Military Naval Hospital
- Controlled by: US Navy

Location
- Coordinates: 33.221464°N 117.389770°W

Site history
- Built: September 1943
- In use: September 1943 – present

Naval Hospital Camp Pendleton is a large US Navy medical treatment facility in Oceanside, California, part of the United States' Military Health System. Located on Camp Pendleton in Camp Pendleton South, California in San Diego County. The current hospital operates in a 500,000-square-foot, four-story building that opened on January 31, 2014. The new complex was completed under the American Recovery and Reinvestment Act of 2009 by the Naval Facilities Engineering Command. A groundbreaking ceremony was held on December 2, 2010, and construction was completed on October 17, 2013.

Naval Hospital Camp Pendleton has 150 beds, a 26-bed emergency center, nine operating rooms, six imaging rooms, and a labor and delivery unit. It also operates branch clinics in the Southern California area. It provides medical care for active-duty military, veterans and their families. Noted architectural achievements include a large solar energy system in the parking structure.

The first naval hospital in the area was called U.S. Naval Hospital, Santa Margarita, California. It was established in 1943 on Rancho Santa Margarita y Las Flores, near Lake O'Neill, to care for the sick and wounded during World War II. It was built quickly, initially with temporary wood-frame buildings on 252 acres. By 1945 it had expanded from 600 to 1,584 beds. In 1950 it was renamed Naval Hospital Camp Joseph H. Pendleton, and has had several other name changes. After the war it was reduced in size, and rebuilt twice.

== See also ==
- California during World War II
- American Theater (1939–1945)
- United States home front during World War II
- DeWitt General Hospital
