= Fallbrook Union Elementary School District =

School district in California, United States

Address
- 321 North Iowa Street Fallbrook, California, 92028; United States

District information
- Type: Public
- Grades: K–8
- NCES District ID: 0613500

Students and staff
- Students: 4,756 (2020–2021)
- Teachers: 228.01 (FTE)
- Staff: 319.96 (FTE)
- Student–teacher ratio: 20.86:1

Other information
- Website: www.fuesd.org

Fallbrook Union Elementary School District is a public school district based in San Diego County, California, United States.

This district includes the Fallbrook census-designated place, portions of Oceanside, and most of the Camp Pendleton Mainside CDP. Some portions of Marine Corps Base Camp Pendleton are in this school district.

Fallbrook Union ESD feeds into Fallbrook Union High School District.
