= Caruso Memorial Chapel =

Coordinates: 33.376911°N 117.477327°W

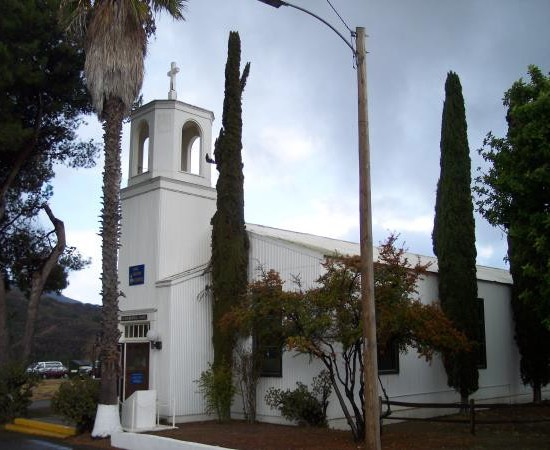
- Caruso Memorial Chapel

Religion
- Affiliation: Non-denominational
- Status: Military Chapel

Location
- Location: Marine Corps Base Camp Pendleton, San Diego County, California, US
- Interactive map of Caruso Memorial Chapel

Architecture
- Completed: 1953

Caruso Memorial Chapel is named in honor of Marine Sergeant Mathew Caruso, was dedicated by the United States Marine Corps in August 1953. Sergeant Caruso gave his life while protecting the life of his chaplain in action against the enemy.

== Preservation and Restoration ==
In April 2012, volunteers from The Church of Jesus Christ of Latter-day Saints and Marines renovated the chapel. The work included landscaping, painting the interior walls, repairing the screens of 15 windows, refurbishing and painting the framework of the entryway. Donations from the Carlsbad, California business community helped purchase supplies. On June 23, 2014, the chapel was rededicated to Sgt. Matthew Caruso, at the School of Infantry-West. Caruso's family and a congregation of more than 100 Marines, sailors and civilian friends attended.

On January 18, 2025, a group of volunteers from a nearby congregation of The Church of Jesus Christ of Latter-day Saints conducted a service project to improve the chapel grounds. The efforts focused on clearing overgrown shrubs, trees, and weeds that had accumulated in recent years. This project aimed to restore the surrounding area to a well-maintained and inviting state, emphasizing the local community's dedication to preserving the chapel's historical and cultural significance.

== Memorial Plaque ==
The memorial plaque reads:

Caruso Memorial Chapel

To the Glory of Almighty God and the memory of Sgt. Mathew Caruso, U.S.M.C., Seventh Marines, 1st Marine Division, killed in action near Koto-Ri, Korea, 6 December 1950, the United States Marine Corps humbly dedicates this Chapel that his Spirit of Loyalty, Courage, and Devotion may serve to inspire all who enter here to pray. 'Greater love than this no man hath, that a man lay down his life for his friends' St. John, 15

== See also ==
- Marine Corps Base Camp Pendleton
- United States Marine Corps

== Gallery ==
Caruso Memorial Chapel

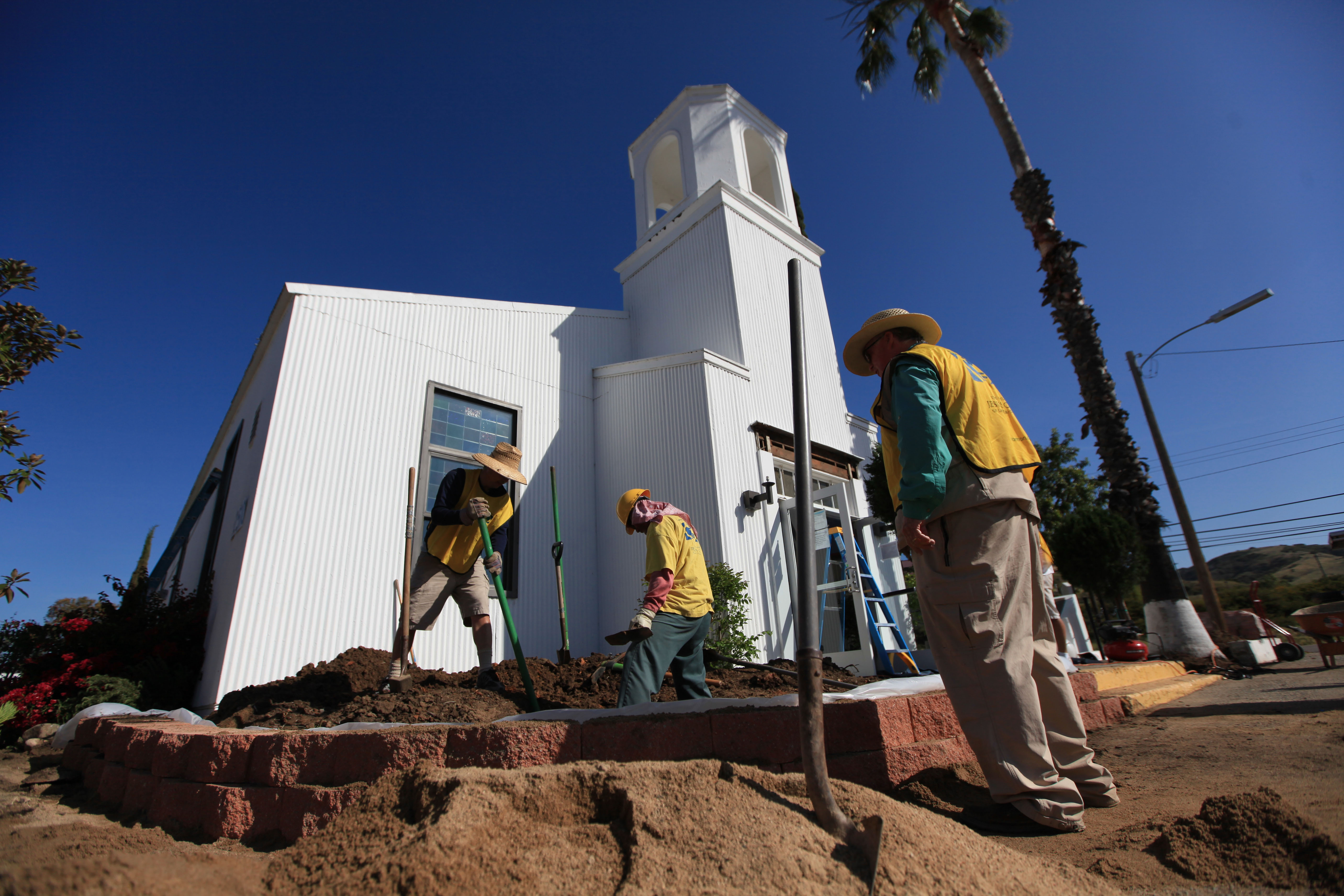
Volunteers help with renovation, April 2012.

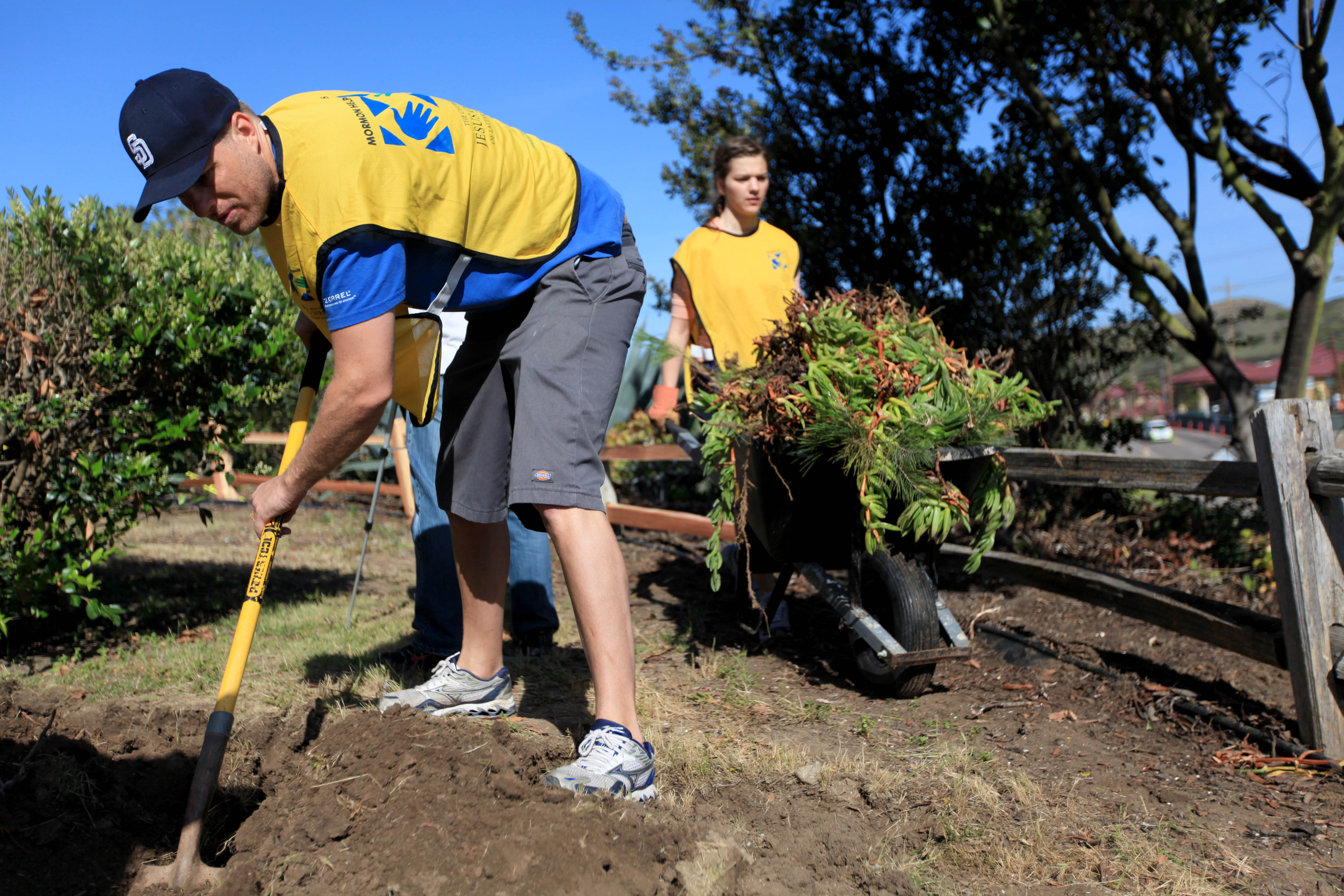
Volunteers help with renovation, April 2012.

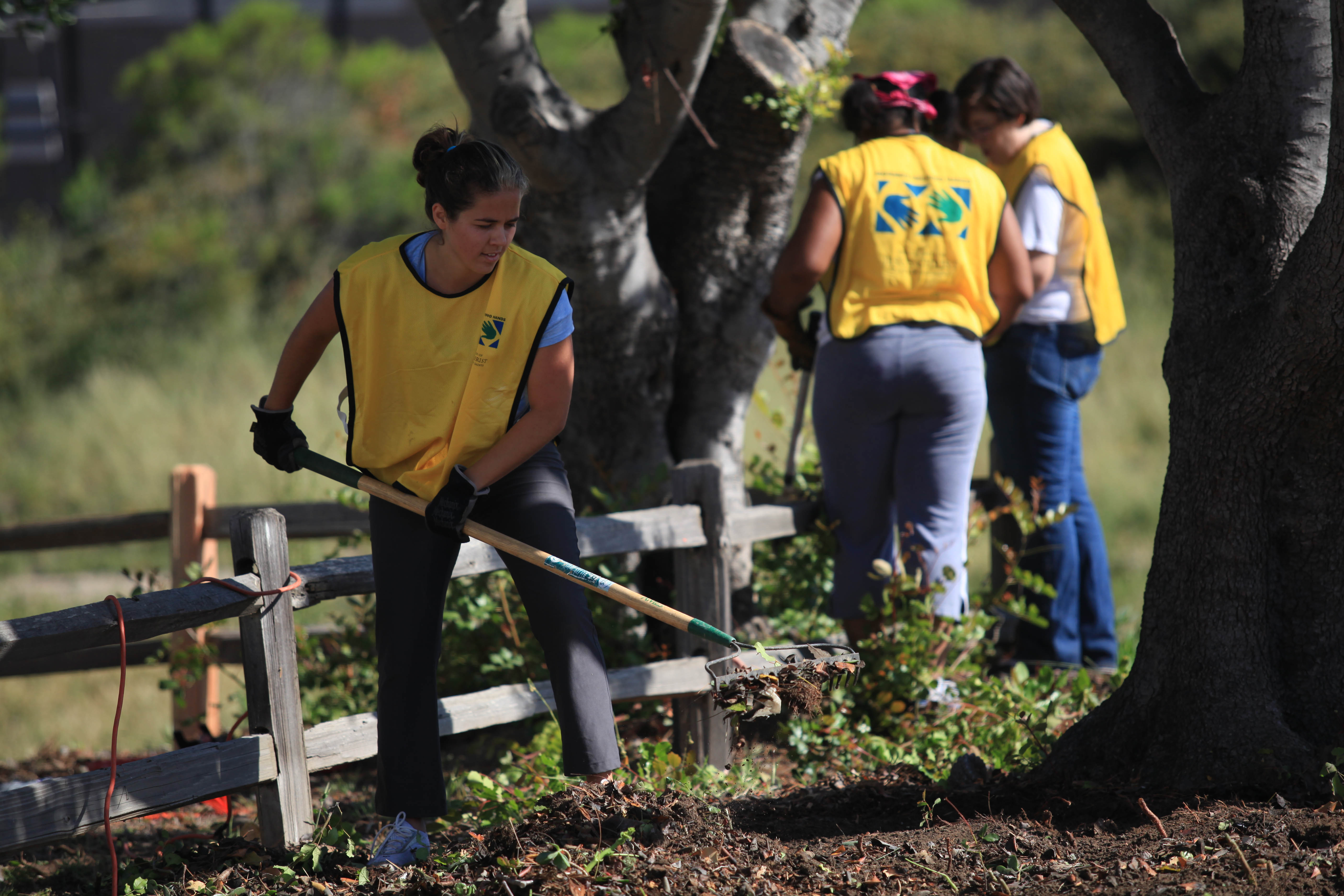
Volunteers help with renovation, April 2012.
