= Oceanside Unified School District =

School district in California, United States

Address
- 2111 Mission Avenue Oceanside, California, 92058; United States

District information
- Type: Public
- Grades: K–12
- Superintendent: Julie Vitale
- NCES District ID: 0628250

Students and staff
- Students: 16,373 (2020–21)
- Teachers: 708.09 (FTE)
- Staff: 871.49 (FTE)
- Student–teacher ratio: 23.12:1

Other information
- Website: www.oside.us

Oceanside Unified School District is a public school district based in Oceanside in San Diego County, California. There are 22 schools in the district, including 11 elementary schools, 4 middle schools, 2 comprehensive high schools, 3 schools on Marine Corps Base Camp Pendleton, 1 alternative high school, and 1 adult program.

Dr. Julie Vitale has been the superintendent since 2018. In 2021, she was recognized for her work in increasing equity across schools in the district by the San Diego County Office of Education.

OUSD includes most of Oceanside as well as the Camp Pendleton South census-designated place and a section of the Camp Pendleton Mainside CDP. Some portions of Marine Corps Base Camp Pendleton are in this school district.

== Demographics ==
Of the 18,899 students, the majority of the students attending the district are Hispanic (58.02%), and the demographic makeup of the district is 24.17% White, 5.47% African American, and 12.34% Other. Approximately 18% of the students are English-language learners. Approximately 57% of the students in the district qualify for free and reduced lunch.

== Schools ==
=== Elementary Schools ===
- Del Rio Stem Academy
- Foussat Language Academy
- Ivey Ranch Elementary School
- Laurel Elementary School
- Libby Elementary School
- McAuliffe Elementary School
- Mission Elementary School
- Nichols Leadership Academy
- Pablo Tac School of the Arts
- Palmquist Elementary School
- South Oceanside Elementary School

=== Middle Schools ===
- Chavez Middle School
- Jefferson Middle School
- Lincoln Middle School
- Martin Luther King Jr. Middle School

=== High School ===
- El Camino High School
- Oceanside High School
- Surfside Educational Academy

=== Camp Pendleton TK-8 Schools ===
- North Terrace School
- Santa Margarita School
- Stuart Mesa School

=== Other ===
- Adult Transition Program

== Notable alumni ==
- Barbara Mandrell, country singer, former Miss Oceanside. Graduated from Oceanside High School in 1967.
- Denise Richards, actress who starred in Starship Troopers, Wild Things and the James Bond film The World Is Not Enough. Graduated from El Camino High School in 1989.
- Victor Villaseñor, acclaimed Mexican-American writer.
- Chris Chambliss, Major League Baseball Player. Graduated from Oceanside High School.
- Gary Thomasson, Major League Baseball Player. Graduated from Oceanside High School.
- Junior Seau, National Football League player. Graduated from Oceanside High School.
- Sam Brenner, National Football League Player. Graduated from Oceanside High School.
- Michael Booker, National Football League Player. Graduated from El Camino High School.
- Willie James Buchanon, National Football League Player. Graduated from Oceanside High School in 1968.
- Joe Salave'a, National Football League Player. Graduated from Oceanside High School.
- Toussaint Tyler, National Football League Player. Graduated from El Camino High School.
- Bryant Westbrook, National Football League Player. Graduated from El Camino High School in 1993.
- Dokie Williams, National Football League Player. Graduated from El Camino High School.
