= Mike Levin =

American politician (born 1978)

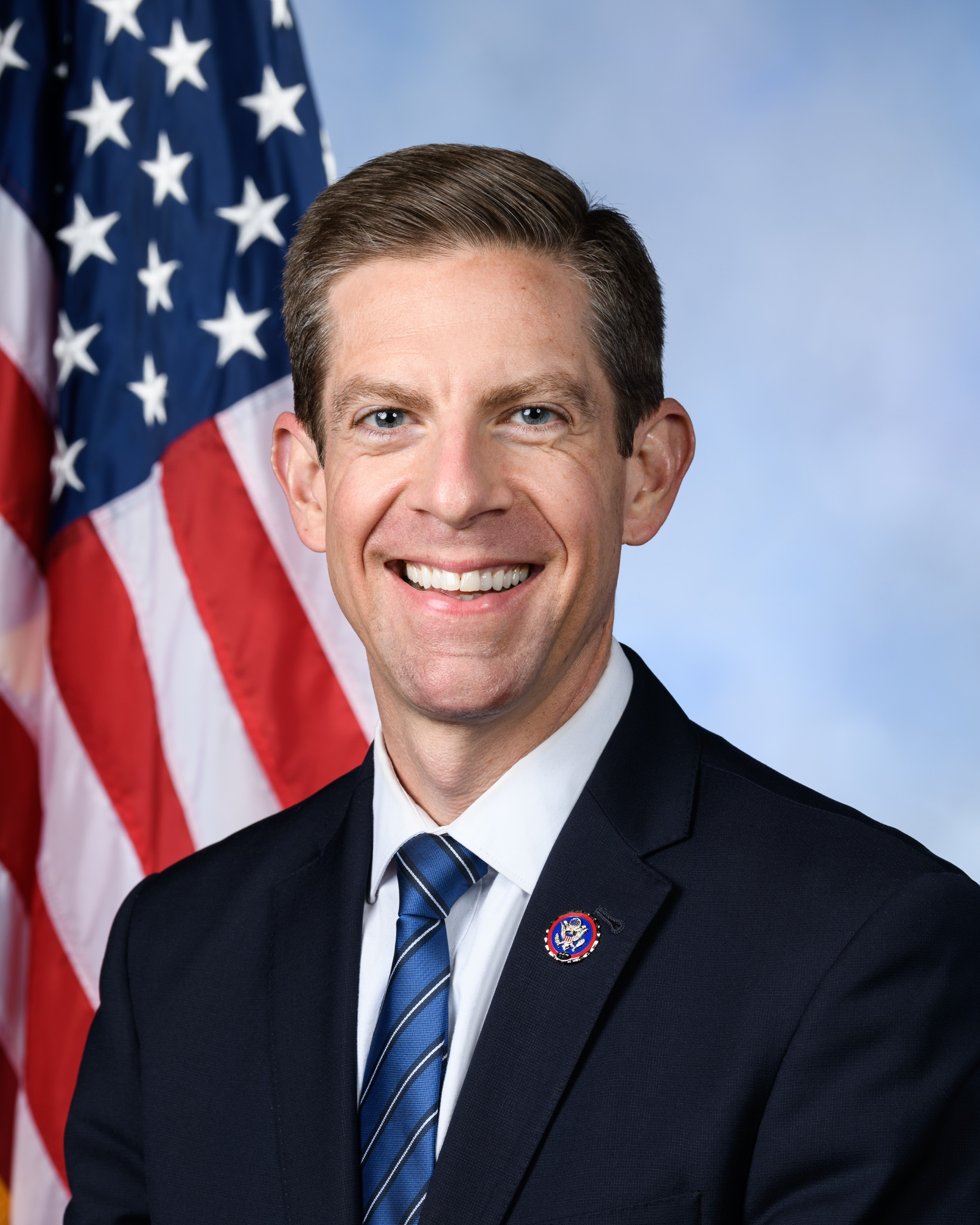
- Official portrait, 2019

Member of the U.S. House of Representatives from California's 49th district
- Incumbent
- Assumed office January 3, 2019
- Preceded by: Darrell Issa

Personal details
- Born: Michael Ted Levin; October 20, 1978 (age 48) Inglewood, California, U.S.
- Party: Democratic
- Spouse: Chrissy Parker (m. 2011)
- Children: 2
- Education: Stanford University (BA); Duke University (JD)
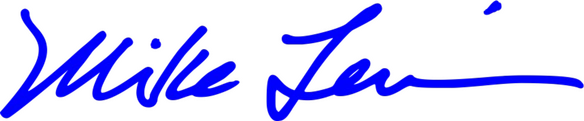
- Signature
- Website: House website Campaign website
- Levin's voice Levin on the work of the House Climate Crisis Committee. Recorded June 30, 2020

Michael Ted Levin (/ˈlɛvɪn/ LEH-vin; born October 20, 1978) is an American politician and attorney serving as the U.S. representative for California's 49th congressional district since 2019. A member of the Democratic Party, Levin represents most of San Diego's North County, including Marine Corps Base Camp Pendleton, as well as a portion of southern Orange County. He is currently serving his fourth term. Levin flipped the historically Republican-held seat in 2018 after the retirement of Darrell Issa and has won four consecutive elections in the competitive district. His legislative work has focused on spent nuclear fuel removal at the San Onofre Nuclear Generating Station, veterans' affairs, and environmental policy.

== Early life and education ==
Levin was born in Inglewood, California, and raised in Lake Forest, Orange County. His mother is Mexican-American and his father is Jewish. Levin was raised in both the Jewish and Catholic faiths. His maternal grandparents immigrated to the United States from Mexico as children, arriving with little formal education or money. They eventually established a business distributing Wurlitzer jukeboxes in Los Angeles, enabling Levin's mother and her four sisters to attend college.

Levin graduated from Loyola High School in Los Angeles in 1997. He attended Stanford University, where he was elected student body president, and graduated in 2001 with a Bachelor of Arts degree. After Stanford, Levin served as a Coro Fellow. He earned a Juris Doctor from Duke University School of Law in 2005, focusing on environmental law.

== Early career ==
After law school, Levin worked as an attorney specializing in energy and environmental law, focusing on regulatory compliance and government affairs.

Levin co-founded CleanTech OC, a trade group promoting sustainable energy in Orange County, and served as vice president of Better Energy Systems, a cleantech startup in Berkeley, California. In 2011, he was featured in OC Metro's "40 Under 40" for his work at FlexEnergy, a company that developed technology to capture and use methane from landfills and wastewater treatment facilities. From 2014 to 2017, he was the director of government affairs at FuelCell Energy and served on the board of the Center for Sustainable Energy in San Diego.

Levin was also active in Democratic politics, serving as executive director of the Democratic Party of Orange County. In 2016, he joined Hillary Clinton's presidential campaign as a member of the national finance committee.

== U.S. House of Representatives ==
=== Elections ===
==== 2018 ====
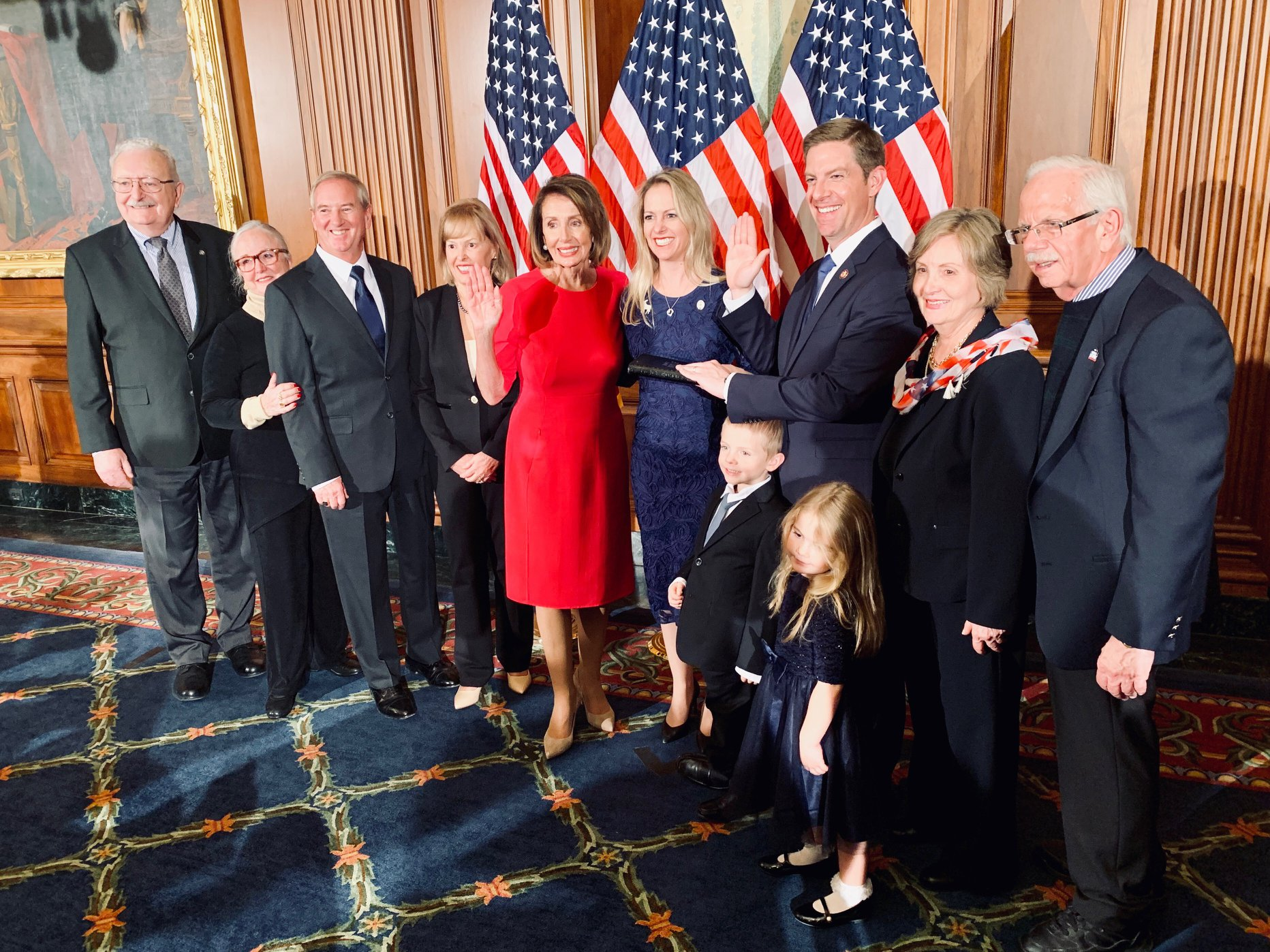
Levin is sworn into the 116th Congress, 2019

On March 8, 2017, Levin announced his candidacy for California's 49th congressional district. The district had historically been one of Southern California's more Republican seats, but redistricting after the 2010 census cut out most of its heavily Republican inland portion, making it significantly more competitive. Darrell Issa had nearly been defeated in 2016 as Hillary Clinton carried the district, and announced his retirement in January 2018.

At a town hall event that Issa held on March 11, 2017, Levin publicly confronted Issa and mentioned a book he had sent him in 2016, Climate Change for Beginners. Levin charged that Issa's solution to climate problems "is to build more natural gas plants and to keep the nuclear energy plants online for longer.... I think that's an unfathomable proposal for a progressive and environmentally-friendly place like San Diego."

The open seat attracted 16 candidates to the nonpartisan blanket primary, raising fears that Democrats would be locked out of the general election entirely. In the June 5 primary, Levin came in second to Republican Diane Harkey and advanced to the general election. Barack Obama endorsed Levin during the general election campaign. Levin won with 56.4% of the vote, flipping the seat from Republican control.

==== 2020 ====
In the 2020 general election, Levin defeated Republican Brian Maryott with 53.1% of the vote.

==== 2022 ====
Following the 2021 redistricting by the California Citizens Redistricting Commission, the 49th district's boundaries shifted. In the 2022 general election, Levin again defeated Brian Maryott with 52.6% of the vote.

==== 2024 ====
The National Republican Congressional Committee named the 49th as one of its top targets nationally. Republican challenger Matt Gunderson, a car dealership owner, positioned himself as a pro-choice Republican, an unusual stance that made the race more competitive in the socially moderate coastal district.

On July 12, 2024, Levin became one of approximately 20 congressional Democrats to publicly call for Joe Biden to withdraw from the 2024 United States presidential election.

On election night, Levin led by roughly 19,000 votes, but the margin tightened overnight to approximately 5,000 votes as additional ballots were counted. He ultimately won with 52.2% to Gunderson's 47.8%, despite a national political environment in which Donald Trump won the presidential election.

==== 2026 ====
In November 2025, California voters approved Proposition 50, a legislatively referred constitutional amendment that temporarily replaced the state's independently drawn congressional maps with new legislature-drawn boundaries for 2026 through 2030. The measure was a response to mid-decade redistricting by the Texas Legislature that favored Republicans.

Under Proposition 50, the 49th district shifted south, adding coastal San Diego communities such as La Jolla and Torrey Pines, as well as inland North County communities including Fallbrook and Bonsall, which had previously been in the 48th district. The proportion of the district in San Diego County increased from approximately 65% to 81%, and its Cook Partisan Voter Index moved from roughly even to D+4. San Diego County Supervisor Jim Desmond, who initially announced a challenge to Levin, subsequently switched to run in the 48th district after Proposition 50 redistricted him out of the 49th. Levin will face retired Navy captain Armen Kurdian in November. Levin has emphasized the $1.1 billion he has brought back to the district as part of his campaign.

=== Tenure ===
Levin was sworn into the House of Representatives on January 3, 2019, during a government shutdown. According to GovTrack, he has been the primary sponsor of nine enacted bills as of 2025. The Center for Effective Lawmaking, a joint project of the University of Virginia and Vanderbilt University, rated him one of the most effective freshman lawmakers of the 116th Congress and ranked him eighth among all House members on defense and veterans' issues. During his 2024 campaign, Levin stated he had authored more than 30 bipartisan bills signed into law by presidents of both parties and secured over $1 billion in federal funding for his district.

==== San Onofre nuclear waste ====
The San Onofre Nuclear Generating Station (SONGS), located in Levin's district between Interstate 5 and the Pacific Ocean, closed in 2012 after radioactive reactor coolant leaked from a steam generator. Approximately 3.6 million pounds of spent nuclear fuel remain stored at the site in stainless steel canisters. Over 8 million people live within 50 miles of the plant, which sits near active earthquake fault lines and is subject to rising sea levels.

In August 2018, before Levin took office, a canister loaded with spent nuclear fuel became misaligned while being lowered into an underground storage vault at SONGS. The canister came to rest on the vault's inner ring assembly, unsupported by its lifting equipment, and could have fallen 18 feet if it had slipped further. Workers did not initially realize the canister was stuck; they believed it had been properly seated until a radiation protection technician registered higher-than-expected radiation readings. The Nuclear Regulatory Commission (NRC) subsequently identified multiple safety violations related to the incident, including inadequate training and the lack of redundant drop protection.

Upon entering Congress in January 2019, Levin convened a SONGS Task Force of local stakeholders and experts, led by former NRC Chairman Gregory Jaczko and Rear Admiral Leendert "Len" Hering Sr. (USN, Ret.), to formulate policy recommendations. He led a letter to NRC Chairwoman Kristine Svinicki demanding that a pre-decisional enforcement conference on the SONGS violations be relocated near the site so the public could attend; the NRC declined. He also introduced the INSPECT Act to require the NRC to maintain a resident inspector at decommissioning plants during fuel transfer activities, a response to the 2018 incident and a recommendation of his Task Force.

In July 2021, Levin co-founded the bipartisan Spent Nuclear Fuel Solutions Caucus with Rep. Rodney Davis (R-IL) to address stranded commercial spent fuel across the country. He introduced the Spent Fuel Prioritization Act to rank sites for removal based on population density and seismic hazard, and in 2024 co-authored the bipartisan Nuclear Waste Administration Act with Rep. August Pfluger (R-TX) to create an independent federal agency for nuclear waste management. As of January 2026, Levin had secured over $248 million in federal funding for the safe removal and management of the nation's spent nuclear fuel.

==== Veterans' affairs ====
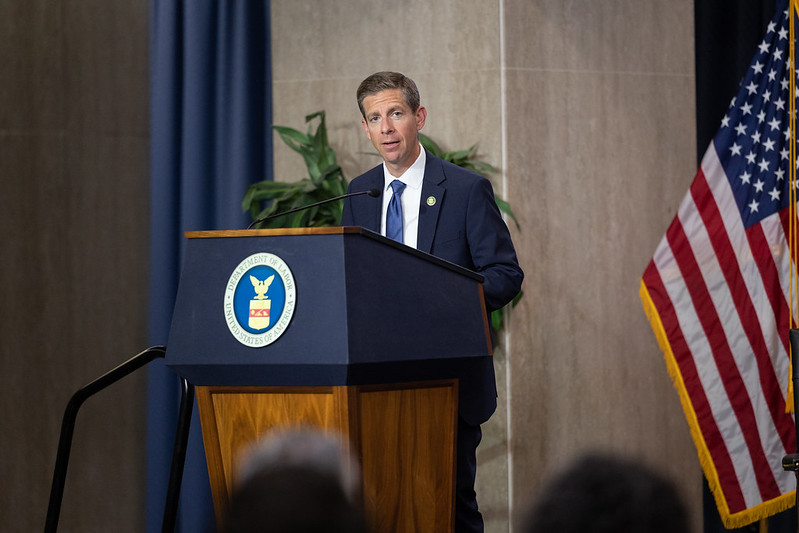
Levin in 2023

Levin served as the lead Democrat on the House Veterans' Affairs Committee's Subcommittee on Economic Opportunity, chairing it for four years during the 116th and 117th Congresses.

Levin authored the Johnny Isakson and David P. Roe, M.D. Veterans Health Care and Benefits Improvement Act of 2020 (H.R. 7105), which expanded VA services for homeless veterans, improved the Transition Assistance Program for servicemembers returning to civilian life, and increased transparency among educational programs receiving GI Bill funds. He subsequently introduced and passed the THRIVE Act to update VA job training and education programs, the VENTURE Act, and the Veterans Auto and Education Improvement Act of 2022. He also authored legislation to designate the VA Medical Center in San Diego as the Jennifer Moreno Department of Veterans Affairs Medical Center, honoring a decorated combat veteran from San Diego killed in action in Afghanistan in 2013.

In 2024, the Veterans of Foreign Wars awarded Levin its Congressional Award for Legislator of the Year, an honor presented annually since 1964 to one member of Congress. VFW Commander-in-Chief Duane Sarmiento stated that Levin "exemplifies the values of service and advocacy that we at the VFW strive to live every day."

==== Environment and energy ====
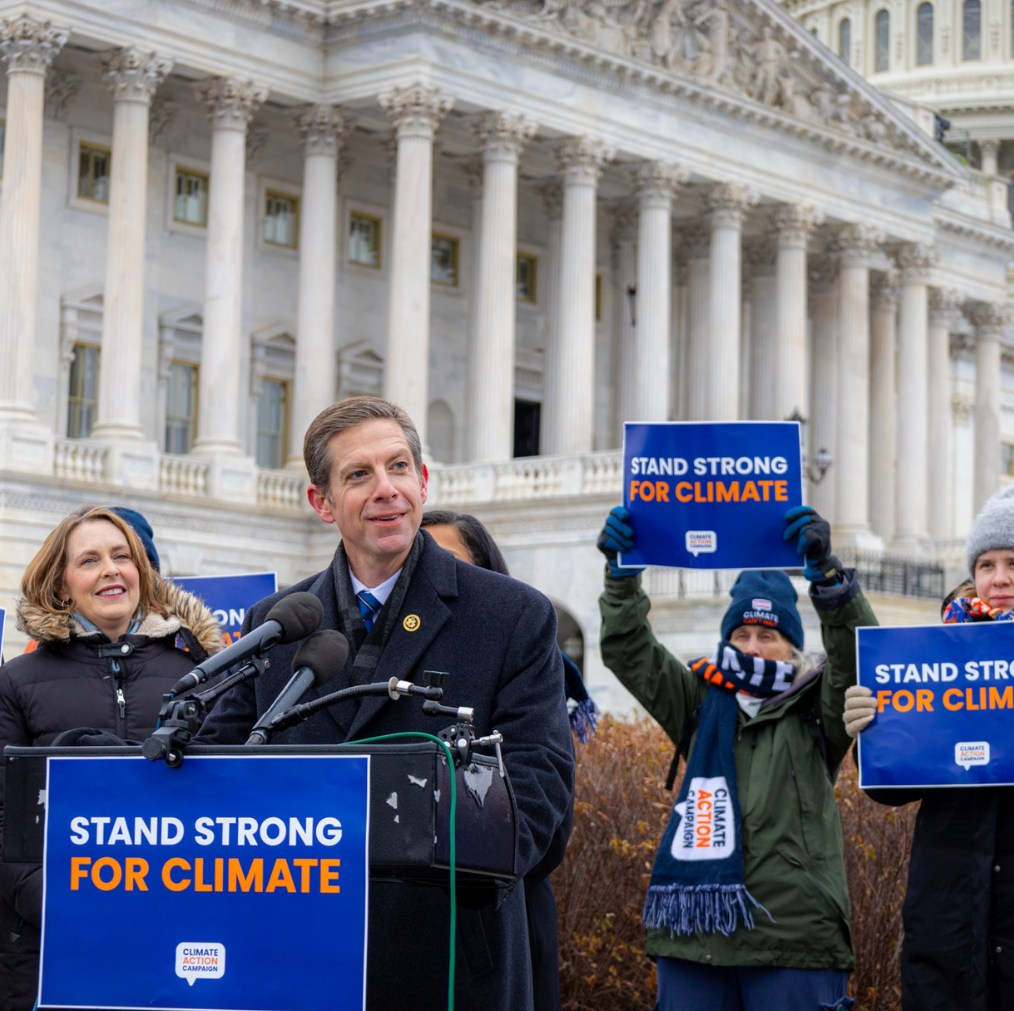
Levin speaks in support of climate change mitigation legislation, 2025

Levin serves as vice chair of the Sustainable Energy and Environment Coalition (SEEC). During the 116th Congress, he served on the Select Committee on the Climate Crisis.

He voted for the Inflation Reduction Act of 2022. He has introduced legislation to ban new offshore drilling along the coast of Southern California and to transition the United States to zero-emission vehicles. In early 2025, he opposed an executive order by President Trump to allow offshore drilling off the West Coast.

==== Infrastructure ====
Levin supported the Infrastructure Investment and Jobs Act, which passed with bipartisan support. He pushed for funding from the law to be allocated for a rail tunnel under Del Mar to relocate the Pacific Surfliner railway line, which runs along unstable coastal bluffs, with the goal of completing the project by 2035. Levin also secured $1.8 million in 2022 and $2.27 million in 2025 to complete an Army Corps of Engineers study of Oceanside's eroding beaches, which Congress had originally authorized back in 2000. The draft report, released in June 2026, recommended placing 4 million cubic yards of sand to restore the beach between Oceanside Harbor and Buena Vista Lagoon. Levin said he would push for the federal government to cover the full cost of the effort.

=== Committee assignments ===
Levin's committee assignments for the 119th Congress include:

- Committee on Appropriations
  - Energy and Water Development and Related Agencies
  - Military Construction, Veterans Affairs, and Related Agencies

Previous committee assignments include:

- Natural Resources (116th–118th)
- Veterans' Affairs (116th–118th), including chair of the Subcommittee on Economic Opportunity (116th–117th)
- Select Committee on the Climate Crisis (116th–117th)

=== Caucus memberships ===
- Congressional Hispanic Caucus
- New Democrat Coalition
- Congressional Progressive Caucus
- Congressional Equality Caucus
- Future Forum
- Spent Nuclear Fuel Solutions Caucus (co-founder and co-chair)
- Sustainable Energy and Environment Coalition (vice chair)

== Political positions ==
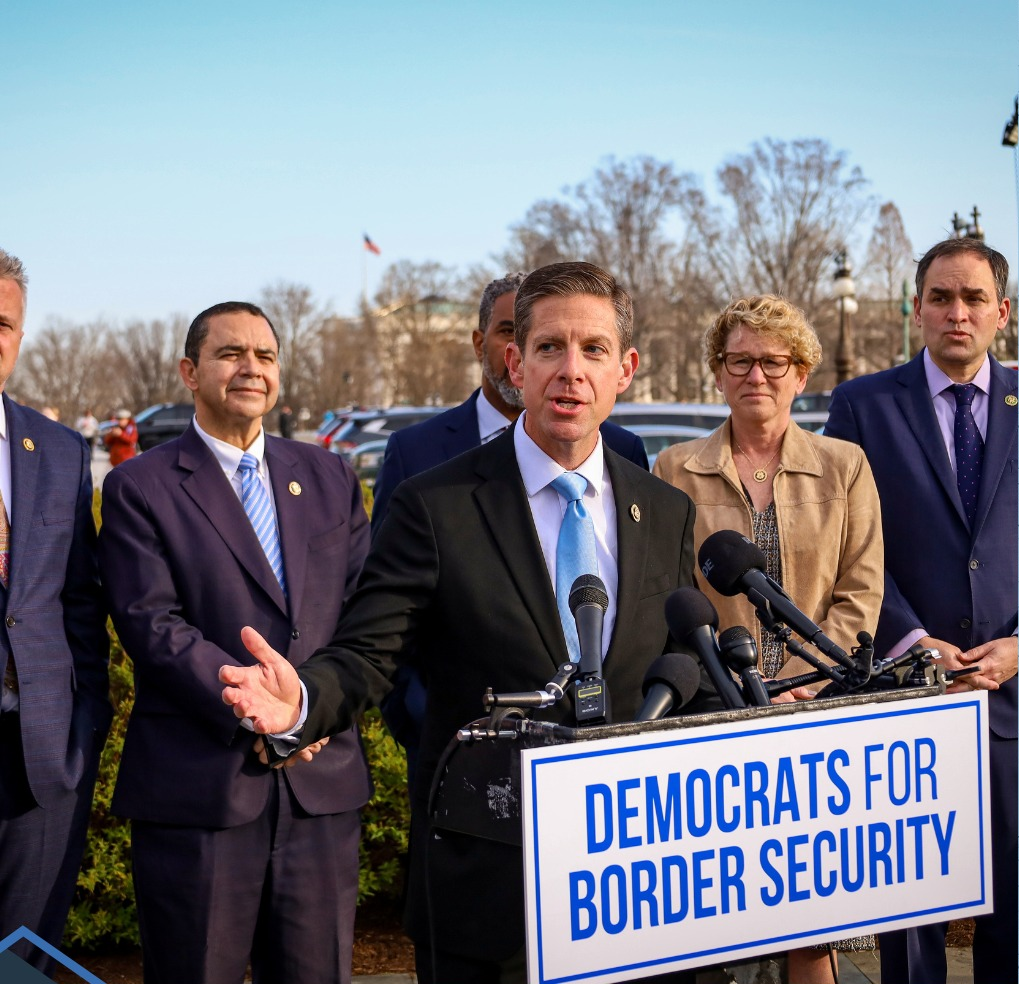
Levin in 2024

=== Abortion ===
Levin has a 100% rating from NARAL Pro-Choice America and an F grade from the Susan B. Anthony List.

=== LGBTQ rights ===
In 2022, Levin voted for the Respect for Marriage Act. In 2024, he voted for the National Defense Authorization Act, which included a provision prohibiting insurance coverage of trans health care; Levin stated he supported the bill for its pay raises and quality-of-life provisions for service members.

=== Gun policy ===
Levin supports an assault weapons ban and universal background checks. In 2022, he voted for the Assault Weapons Ban of 2022 and the Bipartisan Safer Communities Act.

=== Immigration ===
Levin has co-sponsored the Dignity Act, a bipartisan immigration package that would expand border enforcement in exchange for increased pathways to legal status, and the American Dream and Promise Act, which would provide a pathway to citizenship for Dreamers, TPS holders, and Deferred Enforced Departure (DED) recipients.

During the second Trump administration, Levin voted against the fiscal year 2026 Department of Homeland Security funding bill and subsequent government funding package over the absence of accountability measures for ICE. He signed amicus briefs regarding birthright citizenship and data sharing for immigration enforcement, and conducted oversight visits to ICE detention facilities.

In February 2026, Levin invited Stephanie Quintino as his guest to the 2026 State of the Union address. Quintino's parents, Gladys and Nelson Gonzalez, had lived in Southern California for 35 years, had no criminal record, and were deported to Colombia in February 2025 after being detained by ICE at a routine check-in.

=== Prediction markets ===
On March 1, 2026, following the U.S.–Israel strikes on Iran, Levin posted on X flagging a Polymarket account called "Magamyman" that had made over $500,000 betting on the strike, with the first trade placed 71 minutes before the news became public at 17% implied odds. Levin also noted that Donald Trump Jr. sits on Polymarket's advisory board and that his firm had invested in the platform. The post received over 3.5 million views and was covered by CNN, Al Jazeera, The New York Times, NPR, and Bloomberg.

On March 12, 2026, Levin introduced the DEATH BETS Act (H.R. 7942), which would prohibit any CFTC-registered entity from listing contracts that involve terrorism, assassination, war, or an individual's death. The Senate companion bill was introduced by Sen. Adam Schiff.

=== Trade and tariffs ===
Levin opposed tariffs imposed by President Trump. Following the Supreme Court's ruling in Learning Resources, Inc. v. Trump striking down the tariffs, Levin stated he had "opposed Trump's tariff scheme from day one." He co-sponsored legislation to require the refund of tariffs collected under the International Emergency Economic Powers Act.

=== Housing ===
Levin supports restricting hedge funds from buying single-family housing stock, advocates for a tax credit for first-time home buyers, and secured federal funding for a homeless shelter in Oceanside.

=== Israel ===
Levin supports a two-state solution. In March 2024, he called for a temporary cease-fire to allow humanitarian aid into Gaza while supporting continued military aid to Israel. In April 2024, he stated that "new leaders are needed" in Israel and that Prime Minister Benjamin Netanyahu was not "ultimately leading to a more peaceful outcome."

=== Congressional stock trading ===
Levin supports a ban on congressional stock trading.

== Personal life ==
Levin lives in San Juan Capistrano with his wife, Chrissy, and their two children.

== Electoral history ==
2018 U.S. House of Representatives election, California's 49th district
Primary election
Party	Candidate	Votes	%
Republican	Diane Harkey	46,468	25.52
Democratic	Mike Levin	31,850	17.49
Democratic	Sara Jacobs	28,778	15.80
Democratic	Doug Applegate	23,850	13.10
Republican	Kristin Gaspar	15,467	8.49
Republican	Rocky Chávez	13,739	7.54
Democratic	Paul Kerr	8,099	4.44
Republican	Brian Maryott	5,496	3.02
Republican	Mike Schmitt	2,379	1.31
multiple	Other candidates (7)	5,964	3.28
Total votes		182,090	100
General election
Democratic	Mike Levin	166,453	56.42
Republican	Diane Harkey	128,577	43.58
Total votes		295,030	100
Democratic gain from Republican			

2020 U.S. House of Representatives election California's 49th district
Primary election
Party	Candidate	Votes	%
Democratic	Mike Levin (incumbent)	125,639	56.58
Republican	Brian Maryott	96,424	43.42
Total votes		222,063	100
General election
Democratic	Mike Levin (incumbent)	205,349	53.13
Republican	Brian Maryott	181,157	46.87
Total votes		386,506	100
Democratic hold			

2022 U.S. House of Representatives election California's 49th district
Primary election
Party	Candidate	Votes	%
Democratic	Mike Levin (incumbent)	92,211	48.90
Republican	Brian Maryott	35,805	18.99
Republican	Lisa Bartlett	20,163	10.69
Republican	Christopher Rodriguez	18,248	9.68
Republican	Josiah O'Neil	14,746	7.82
Democratic	Nadia Bahia Smalley	4,804	2.55
Republican	Renee Taylor	2,597	1.38
Total votes		188,574	100
General election
Democratic	Mike Levin (incumbent)	153,541	52.63
Republican	Brian Maryott	138,194	47.37
Total votes		291,735	100
Democratic hold			

2024 U.S. House of Representatives election California's 49th district
Primary election
Party	Candidate	Votes	%
Democratic	Mike Levin (incumbent)	97,275	50.98
Republican	Matt Gunderson	49,001	25.68
Republican	Margarita Wilkinson	20,900	10.95
Republican	Kate Monroe	19,026	9.97
Republican	Sheryl Adams	4,617	2.42
Total votes		190,819	100
General election
Democratic	Mike Levin (incumbent)	197,397	52.17
Republican	Matt Gunderson	180,950	47.83
Total votes		378,347	100
Democratic hold			

2026 U.S. House of Representatives election California's 49th district
Primary election
Party	Candidate	Votes	%
Democratic	Mike Levin (incumbent)	125,869	55.85
Republican	Armen Kurdian	58,822	26.10
Republican	Star Parker	40,661	18.04
Total votes		225,352	100

== See also ==
- List of Hispanic and Latino Americans in the United States Congress
- List of Jewish members of the United States Congress
- San Onofre Nuclear Generating Station
- 2025 California Proposition 50

U.S. House of Representatives
Preceded by Darrell Issa	Member of the U.S. House of Representatives from California's 49th congressional district 2019–present	Incumbent
U.S. order of precedence (ceremonial)
Preceded by Susie Lee	United States representatives by seniority 212th	Succeeded by Lucy McBath
