= Camp Pendleton South, California =

Camp Pendleton South
- census-designated place
- Interactive map of Camp Pendleton South
- Location in the United States
- Coordinates: 33°13′0″N 117°23′28″W
- Country: United States
- State: California
- County: San Diego

Area
  - Total: 7.35 sq mi (19.03 km^{2})
  - Land: 6.95 sq mi (17.99 km^{2})
  - Water: 0.40 sq mi (1.04 km^{2}) 2.40%

Population (2020)
  - Total: 12,468
  - Density: 1,795.0/sq mi (693.04/km^{2})
- Time zone: UTC-8 (PST)
  - Summer (DST): UTC-7 (PDT)
- ZIP code: 92055
- Area codes: 442/760
- FIPS code: 06-10561
- GNIS feature ID: 2407947

Camp Pendleton South is a census-designated place (CDP) in San Diego County, California, located at the southwest corner of the Marine Corps Base Camp Pendleton. The population was 12,468 at the 2020 census, up from 10,616 at the 2010 census. Much of the population are residents of Camp Pendleton barracks situated in the area, as well as housing communities for married Marine and Navy personnel and their families. It, along with Camp Pendleton Mainside, is one of two CDPs on the base.

== Geography ==
Camp Pendleton South is located at 33°13′0″N 117°23′28″W (33.216620, -117.390989).

According to the United States Census Bureau, the CDP has a total area of 4.0 square miles (10 km^{2}), of which 3.9 square miles (10 km^{2}) is land and 0.1 square miles (0.26 km^{2}) (2.40%) is water.

== Demographics ==
Historical population
Census	Pop.	Note	%±
1970	13,692		—
1980	7,952		−41.9%
1990	11,299		42.1%
2000	8,854		−21.6%
2010	10,616		19.9%
2020	12,468		17.4%
U.S. Decennial Census; 1860–1870 1880-1890; 1900 1910 1920; 1930 1940 1950; 1960 1970 1980; 1990 2000 2010; 2020

Camp Pendleton South first appeared as an Unincorporated community in the 1970 U.S. census; and was then listed as a census designated place in the 1980 U.S. census.

=== Racial and ethnic composition ===
Camp Pendleton South CDP, California – Racial and ethnic composition Note: the US Census treats Hispanic/Latino as an ethnic category. This table excludes Latinos from the racial categories and assigns them to a separate category. Hispanics/Latinos may be of any race.
Race / Ethnicity (NH = Non-Hispanic)	Pop 2000	Pop 2010	Pop 2020	% 2000	% 2010	% 2020
White alone (NH)	5,039	6,144	6,453	56.91%	57.87%	51.76%
Black or African American alone (NH)	1,203	934	1,048	13.59%	8.80%	8.41%
Native American or Alaska Native alone (NH)	124	109	93	1.40%	1.03%	0.75%
Asian alone (NH)	320	270	401	3.61%	2.54%	3.22%
Native Hawaiian or Pacific Islander alone (NH)	54	35	85	0.61%	0.33%	0.68%
Other race alone (NH)	31	6	54	0.35%	0.06%	0.43%
Mixed race or Multiracial (NH)	392	532	744	4.43%	5.01%	5.97%
Hispanic or Latino (any race)	1,691	2,586	3,590	19.10%	24.36%	28.79%
Total	8,854	10,616	12,468	100.00%	100.00%	100.00%

=== 2020 census ===
As of the 2020 census, Camp Pendleton South had a population of 12,468 and a population density of 1,795.0 inhabitants per square mile (693.1/km^{2}). The median age was 22.3 years. The age distribution was 31.5% under the age of 18, 33.7% aged 18 to 24, 31.7% aged 25 to 44, 2.7% aged 45 to 64, and 0.4% who were 65 years of age or older. For every 100 females, there were 116.2 males, and for every 100 females age 18 and over, there were 121.5 males age 18 and over.

The census reported that 90.6% of the population lived in households, 9.4% lived in non-institutionalized group quarters, and no one was institutionalized. 82.8% of residents lived in urban areas, while 17.2% lived in rural areas.

There were 3,696 households, out of which 57.8% included children under the age of 18, 87.5% were married-couple households, 0.4% were cohabiting couple households, 7.0% had a female householder with no spouse or partner present, and 5.1% had a male householder with no spouse or partner present. 4.5% of households were one person, and 0.2% were one person aged 65 or older. The average household size was 3.06. There were 3,503 families (94.8% of all households).

There were 4,490 housing units at an average density of 646.4 units per square mile (249.6 units/km^{2}), of which 3,696 (82.3%) were occupied and 17.7% were vacant. Of the occupied units, 0.7% were owner-occupied and 99.3% were occupied by renters. The homeowner vacancy rate was 2.6%, and the rental vacancy rate was 15.1%.

=== Income and poverty ===
In 2023, the US Census Bureau estimated that the median household income was $66,265, and the per capita income was $23,944. About 5.0% of families and 6.4% of the population were below the poverty line.

=== 2010 census ===
At the 2010 census Camp Pendleton South had a population of 10,616. The population density was 2,652.1 inhabitants per square mile (1,024.0/km^{2}). The racial makeup of Camp Pendleton South was 7,530 (70.9%) White, 992 (9.3%) African American, 146 (1.4%) Native American, 299 (2.8%) Asian, 41 (0.4%) Pacific Islander, 725 (6.8%) from other races, and 883 (8.3%) from two or more races. Hispanic or Latino of any race were 2,586 persons (24.4%).

The census reported that 9,338 people (88.0% of the population) lived in households, 1,278 (12.0%) lived in non-institutionalized group quarters, and no one was institutionalized.

There were 2,569 households, 2,101 (81.8%) had children under the age of 18 living in them, 2,284 (88.9%) were opposite-sex married couples living together, 173 (6.7%) had a female householder with no husband present, 43 (1.7%) had a male householder with no wife present. There were 7 (0.3%) unmarried opposite-sex partnerships, and 8 (0.3%) same-sex married couples or partnerships. 65 households (2.5%) were one person and 0 (0%) had someone living alone who was 65 or older. The average household size was 3.63. There were 2,500 families (97.3% of households); the average family size was 3.69.

The age distribution was 4,261 people (40.1%) under the age of 18, 2,675 people (25.2%) aged 18 to 24, 3,513 people (33.1%) aged 25 to 44, 161 people (1.5%) aged 45 to 64, and 6 people (0.1%) who were 65 or older. The median age was 21.7 years. For every 100 females, there were 119.6 males. For every 100 females age 18 and over, there were 135.5 males.

There were 2,865 housing units at an average density of 715.7 per square mile, of the occupied units 11 (0.4%) were owner-occupied and 2,558 (99.6%) were rented. The homeowner vacancy rate was 0%; the rental vacancy rate was 10.3%. 36 people (0.3% of the population) lived in owner-occupied housing units and 9,302 people (87.6%) lived in rental housing units.

== Government ==
In the California State Legislature, Camp Pendleton South is in the 38th senatorial district, represented by Democrat Catherine Blakespear, and in the 74th Assembly district, represented by Republican Laurie Davies.

In the United States House of Representatives, Camp Pendleton South is in California's 49th congressional district, represented by Democrat Mike Levin.

== Education ==
The CDP is in the Oceanside Unified School District. OUSD on-post properties of Marine Corps Base Camp Pendleton are assigned to Oceanside High School. The Camp Pendleton property does not have any Department of Defense Education Activity (DoDEA) schools.

== See also ==
- Camp Pendleton Mainside CDP
