= Marine Corps Base Camp Pendleton =

US Marine Corps base in California

- Near Oceanside, California, in the United States
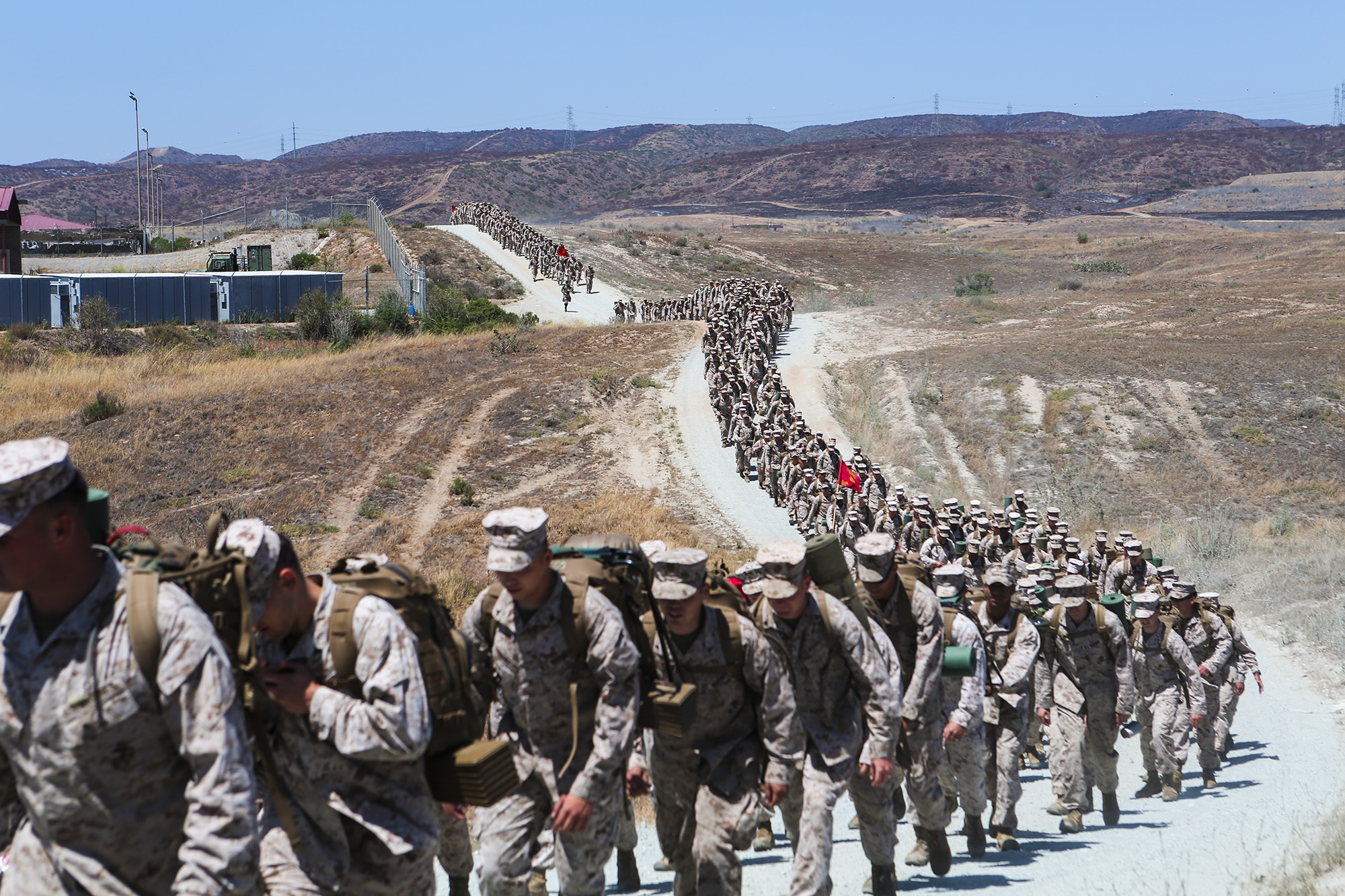
- Marines hiking at Camp Pendleton during 2014

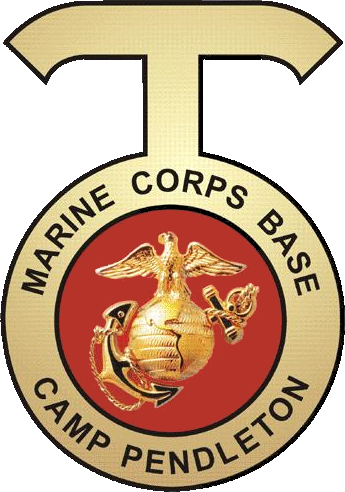

Site information
- Type: Marine Corps base
- Owner: Department of Defense
- Operator: US Marine Corps
- Controlled by: Marine Corps Installations West
- Condition: Operational
- Website: Official website

Location
- Location in the United States MCB Camp Pendleton (the United States)
- Coordinates: 33°12′53.1″N 117°23′15″W
- Area: > 125,000 acres (51,000 hectares)

Site history
- Built: March–September 1942
- In use: 1942–present

Garrison information
- Current commander: Brigadier General Nick I. Brown
- Garrison: I Marine Expeditionary Force

Airfield information
- Airfield: Marine Corps Air Station Camp Pendleton

Marine Corps Base Camp Pendleton is the major West Coast base of the United States Marine Corps and is one of the largest Marine Corps bases in the United States. It is located in San Diego County along the Southern Californian coast, and is bordered by Oceanside to the south, San Clemente in Orange County to the north, La Cresta and Murrieta in Riverside County to the northeast, and Fallbrook to the east.

The base was established in 1942 to train U.S. Marines for service in World War II. By October 1944, Camp Pendleton was declared a "permanent installation," and by 1946 it became the home of the 1st Marine Division. It was named after Major General Joseph Henry Pendleton (1860–1942), who had long advocated setting up a training base for the Marine Corps on the West Coast. Today it is home to many Operating Force units, including the I Marine Expeditionary Force and various training commands.

== History ==
=== Prior to World War II ===
In 1769, a Spanish expedition led by Captain Gaspar de Portolá explored northward from Loreto, Baja California Sur, seeking to reach Monterey Bay, something never before done overland by Europeans. On July 20 of that year, the expedition arrived in the area now known as Camp Pendleton, and as it was the feast day of St. Margaret, they christened the land in the name of Santa Margarita. The expedition went on to establish military outposts and Franciscan missions at San Diego and Monterey.

During the next 30 years, 21 missions were established, the most productive one being Mission San Luis Rey, just south of the present-day Camp Pendleton. At that time, San Luis Rey Mission had control over the Santa Margarita area.

After 1821, following the Mexican War of Independence from Spain, some of the former members of the Portolà expedition who had stayed on (mostly garrison soldiers) were awarded large land grants (ranchos) by Mexican governors. The retired soldiers were joined as rancheros by prominent businessmen, officials, and military leaders. They and their children, the Californios, became the landed gentry of Alta California.

In 1841, two brothers, Pio Pico and Andrés Pico, became the first private owners of Rancho Santa Margarita. More land was later added to the grant, giving it the name of Rancho Santa Margarita y Las Flores, which stayed with the ranch until the Marine Corps acquired it in 1942. The design of the ranch's cattle brand is seen in the base's logo today.

In 1863, an Englishman named John (Don Juan) Forster (Pio Pico's brother-in-law) paid off Pico's gambling debts in return for the deed to the ranch. During his tenure as owner, he expanded the ranch house, built in 1827, and developed the rancho into a thriving cattle industry.

Forster's heirs were forced to sell the ranch in 1882 because of a series of droughts and a fence law that forced Forster to construct fencing around the extensive rancho lands. It was purchased by wealthy cattleman James Clair Flood and managed by Irishman Richard O'Neill, who was eventually rewarded for his faithful service with half ownership. Under the guidance of O'Neill's son, Jerome, the ranch made a profit of nearly half a million dollars annually, and the house was modernized and refurbished.

=== World War II ===
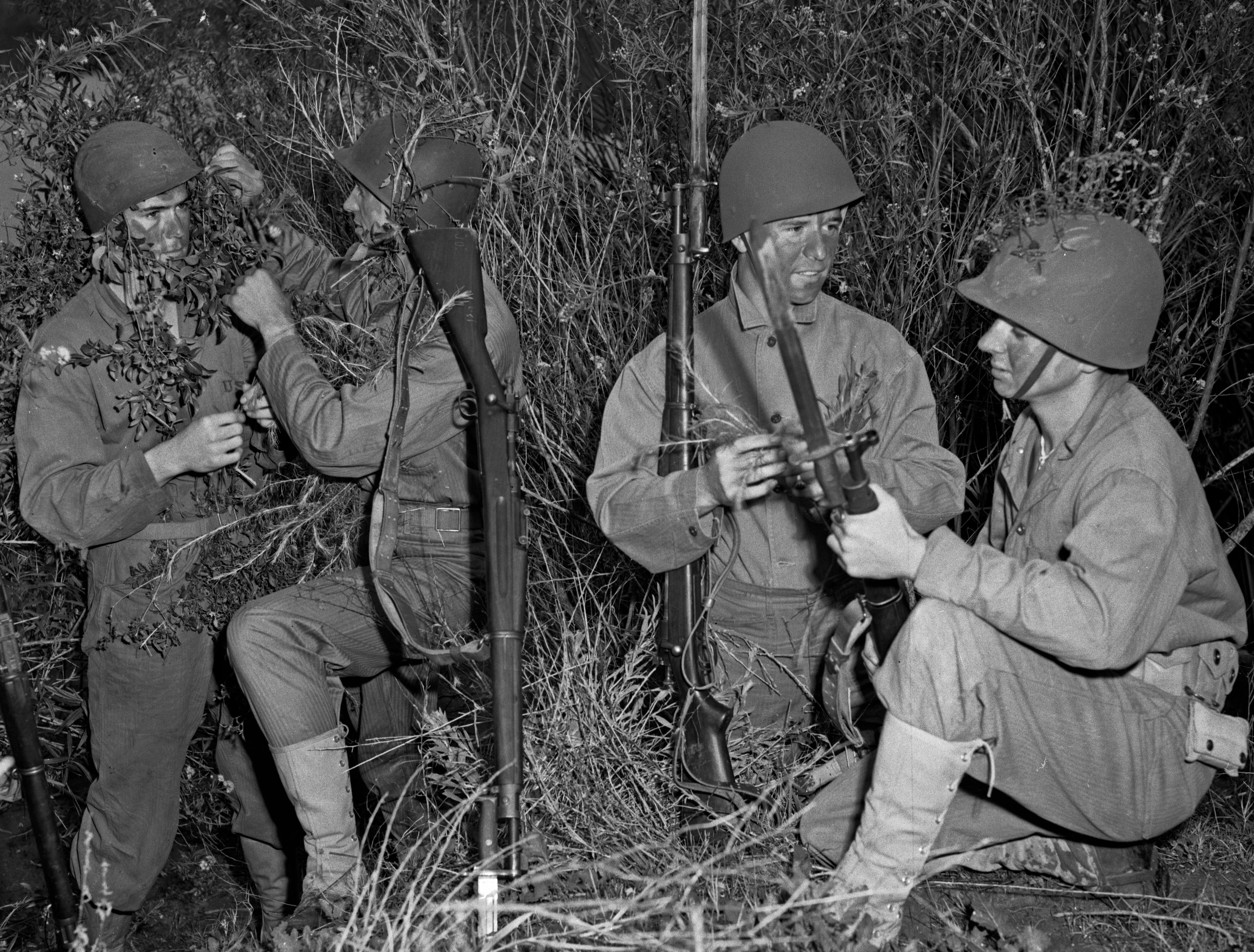
Four Marines training at Camp Pendleton in 1943

In the early 1940s, both the Army and the Marine Corps were looking for land for a large training base. The Army lost interest in the project, but in February 1942 it was announced that the 122,798 acres (497 km^{2}) of Rancho Santa Margarita y Las Flores would be transformed into the largest Marine Corps base in the country. It was named for Major General Joseph Henry Pendleton who had long advocated the establishment of a West Coast training base. Construction began in April as a temporary facility built to minimum standards of wood frame construction. After five months of furious building activity, the 9th Marine Regiment, under then Colonel Lemuel C. Shepherd Jr., marched from Camp Elliott in San Diego to Camp Pendleton to be the first troops to occupy the new base. On September 25, 1942, President Franklin D. Roosevelt officially dedicated the base. Wartime training facilities at the base included landing craft school, amphibious tractor school, beach battalion school, amphibious communications school, Naval Construction Battalion Training Center and a medical field service school at the naval hospital at Santa Margarita Ranch, now Naval Hospital Camp Pendleton. The facility was used as a discharge base for soldiers returning from Europe and Asia after World War II ended in 1945.

=== Post-World War II ===
During the Korean War, $20 million helped expand and upgrade existing facilities, including the construction of Camp Horno. When Camp Pendleton trained the country's fighting force for the Korean and Vietnam Wars, approximately 200,000 Marines passed through the base on their way to the Far East.

Beginning in 1954, Camp Pendleton has hosted a variation of Basic Training familiarization for teenagers age 14 to 17. This training, called "Devil Pups", promotes physical fitness, instills discipline and promotes love of country and the Marine Corps.

The camp's stables display a plaque and statue commemorating a horse, Sergeant Reckless, which served with the Marine Corps in Korea.

In 1975 Camp Pendleton was the first U.S. military base to provide accommodations for Vietnamese evacuees in Operation New Arrivals. Over 50,000 refugees came to the base in the largest humanitarian airlift in history.

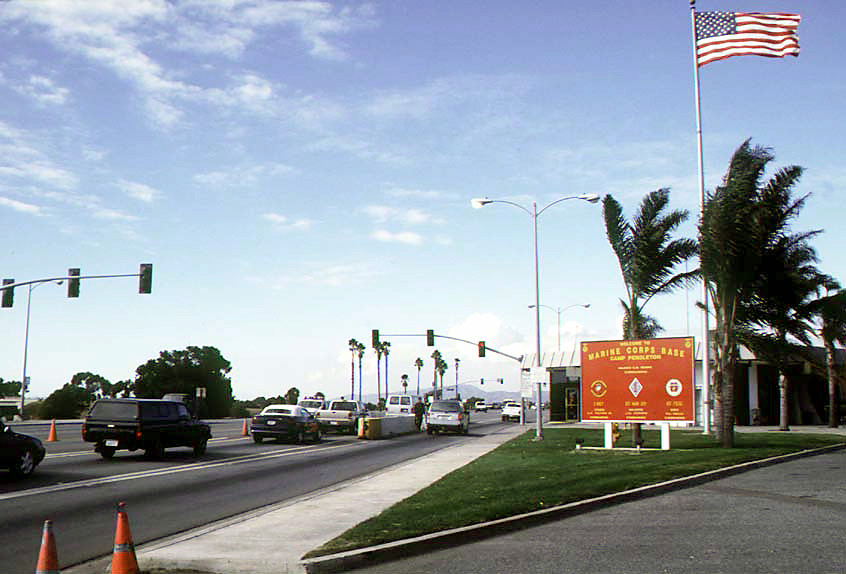
The main gate of Camp Pendleton in November 1997

Camp Pendleton has continued to grow through renovations, replacing its original tent camps with 2,626 buildings and over 500 miles (800 km) of roads.

Preservation of Camp Pendleton heritage and Marine Corps history is ongoing. The original ranch house as well as the Las Flores Adobe have been declared a National Historic Site.

=== 21st century ===
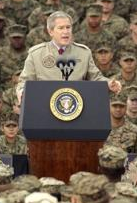
President George W. Bush addressing Marines and sailors at Camp Pendleton in December 2004.

Wounded Warrior Chuck Sketch participates in swim practice on Feb. 14, 2012 at Camp Pendleton

The base's diverse geography, spanning over 125,000 acres (506 km^{2}), plays host to year-round training for Marines in addition to all other branches of the U.S. military. Amphibious and sea-to-shore training takes place at several key points along the base's 17 miles (27 km) of coastline. The main base is in the Mainside Complex, at the southeastern end of the base, and the remote northern interior is an impact area. Daytime population is around 100,000. Recruits from nearby Marine Corps Recruit Depot, San Diego spend four weeks at Pendleton's Edson Range receiving field training; after graduating from recruit training, newly minted infantry Marines return to the base's School of Infantry for further training.

Camp Pendleton remains the last major undeveloped portion of the California coastline south of Santa Barbara, save for a few relatively small state parks. In 2015 the site was proposed for a large civilian airport.

Since August 2004, Camp Pendleton has been one of five locations in the Department of Defense to operate the Standard Terminal Automation Replacement System (STARS) air radar. The STARS radar allows the facility to simulate air traffic for training purposes.

Camp Pendleton's five-man color guard has participated in many sporting events in San Diego and at the 1996 Republican National Convention, accompanying national anthem performers. Among the more famous performers who were accompanied by the Camp Pendleton color guard have been Frankie Laine, Herb Alpert, Wilson Phillips, Jewel, Trisha Yearwood and the Dixie Chicks, all of whom had performed the National Anthem at either a World Series game, Super Bowl, or, in Wilson Phillips' case, a Major League Baseball All-Star Game that was played at what was formerly SDCCU Stadium.

In a 2002 letter to the United States Environmental Protection Agency, Marine Corps Commandant J. L. Jones stated to the Transportation Corridor Agencies (TCA), who operates the toll roads in Orange County, "Frankly, my preference is that the proposed toll road not be constructed on or near Camp Pendleton. This construction is one more encroachment venture that will hinder [our] ability to prepare for war. It will also result in additional losses of natural areas that support endangered species, thus placing an even greater burden on Camp Pendleton to protect the region’s biodiversity." In 2008, after the rejection of the proposed toll road extension of SR 241 through San Onofre State Beach Park for environmental reasons, the TCA filed for permission to build on the northwestern portion of the base. A spokesman for Camp Pendleton denied the request in 2010, stating that they could only allow the toll road to run through the San Onofre State Beach Park because their training missions could not be completed without the proposed land. In fact, the California gnatcatcher, an endangered species, resides on the northwestern portion of the base. The TCA funded a study in 2013 to remove the California gnatcatcher from the endangered species list, which would have made it easier to negotiate the construction and planning of the 241's extension through the San Onofre State Beach Park.

== Areas ==
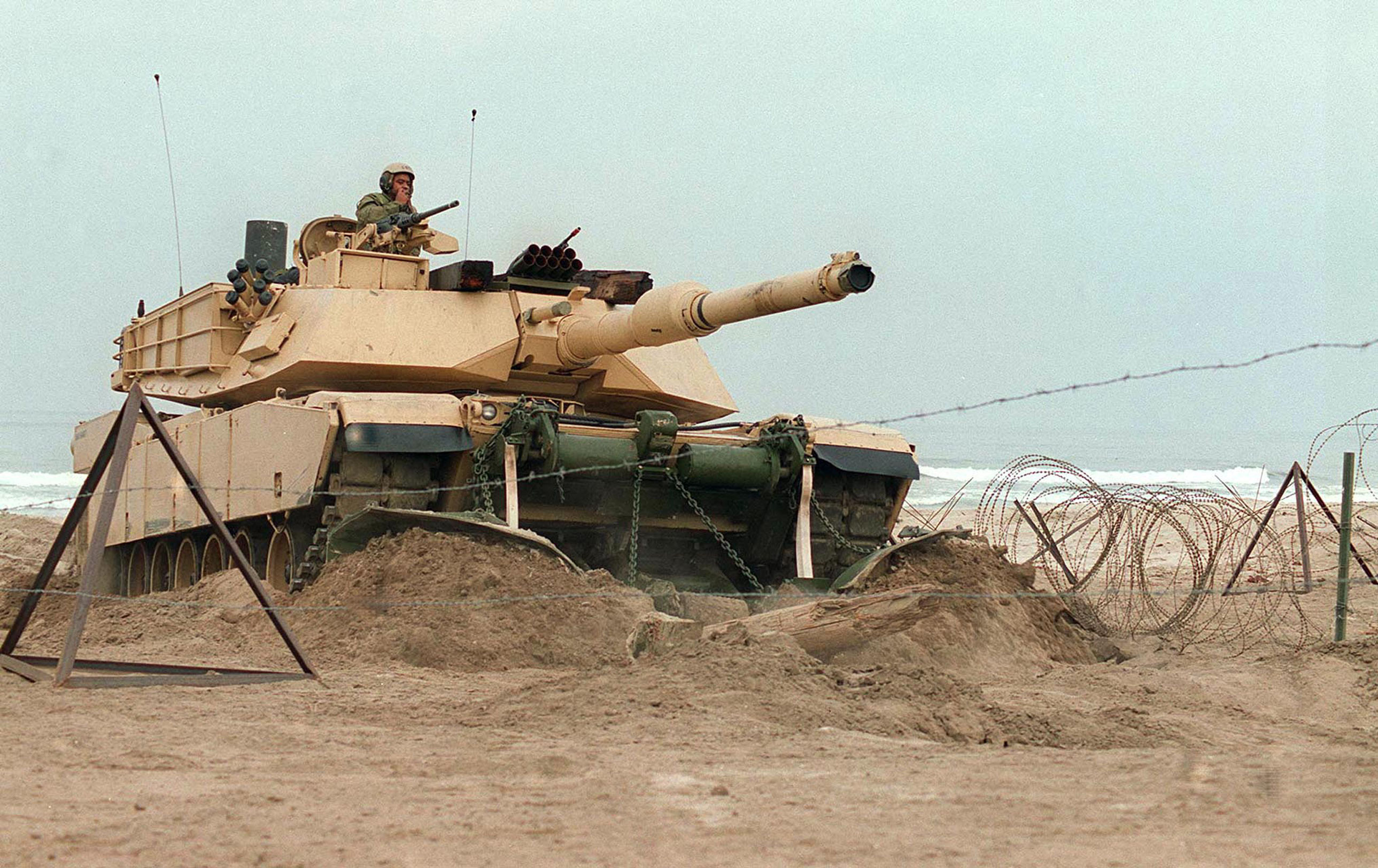
An M1 Abrams breaches the obstacle belt during an amphibious exercise in 1997.

Areas 11-16 are collectively known as "Mainside".

- 11 Area: Serra Mesa Housing, Paige Field House
- 12 Area: Combat Logistics Regiment 1, Combat Logistics Battalion 1, Combat Logistics Battalion 13
- 13 Area: 1st Marine Logistics Group; 9th Communications Battalion; 1st Dental Battalion; Marine Corps Installations West Headquarters; Historic 1st Marine Division "White House"
- 14 Area: Headquarters & Service Battalion 1st MLG; 7th Engineer Support Battalion
- 15 Area: Security & Emergency Services Battalion, Marine Corps Police Department
- 16 Area: 1st Radio Battalion; 1st Intelligence Battalion; 1st EOD Company; 1st Topographic Platoon
- 17 Area: San Luis Rey Housing
- 18 Area: Marine Memorial Golf Course
- 20 Area: MCX, Commissary, Naval Hospital Camp Pendleton, Pacific Views Event Center
- 21 Area (Camp Del Mar): I Marine Expeditionary Force Headquarters; 3rd Assault Amphibian Battalion; Combat Logistics Battalion 5; Amphibious Vehicle Test Branch; Field Medical Training Battalion, 11th Marine Expeditionary Unit, 13th Marine Expeditionary Unit and 15th Marine Expeditionary Unit
- 22 Area (Camp Chappo): 1st Supply Battalion; 1st Medical Battalion
- 23 Area (MCAS Camp Pendleton): Marine Aircraft Group 39
- 24 Area (Camp Pico): Marine Aircraft Group 39 Barracks; Base Brig
- 25 Area (Camp Vado Del Rio): Marine Wing Support Squadron 372
- 26 Area: Lake O'Neill, DeLuz Housing
- 27 Area (Naval Hospital): Mental Health Clinic, American Red Cross, Naval Hospital Barracks
- 31A Area (Edson Range): Weapons & Field Training Battalion
- 31B Area: Marine Corps Tactical Systems Support Activity
- 31C Area: Assault Craft Unit 5
- 32 Area: Marine Air Support Squadron 3, 3rd Low Altitude Air Defense Battalion, Marine Air Control Squadron 1 Det A
- 33 Area (Camp Margarita): 1st Marine Division headquarters, 1st Marine Division Headquarters Battalion, Marine Corps Training Information Management System training facility, 1st Marine Division Band
- 41 Area (Camp Las Flores): 1st Light Armored Reconnaissance Battalion; 1st Reconnaissance Battalion; 4th Light Armored Reconnaissance Battalion, 1st Air Naval Gunfire Liaison Company, 4th Tank Battalion (disbanded)
- 43 Area (Camp Las Pulgas): 11th Marine Regiment; 1st Maintenance Battalion
- 51 Area (Camp San Onofre): San Onofre Housing
- 52 Area: United States Marine Corps School of Infantry
- 53 Area (Camp Horno): 1st Marine Regiment
- 62 Area (Camp San Mateo): 5th Marine Regiment; 1st Combat Engineer Battalion
- 63 Area (Camp Christianitos): Naval Expeditionary Medical Training Institute, La Christianita Historic Site
- 64 Area (Camp Talega): Deployment Processing Command / Reserve Support Unit (West)

== Ecology ==
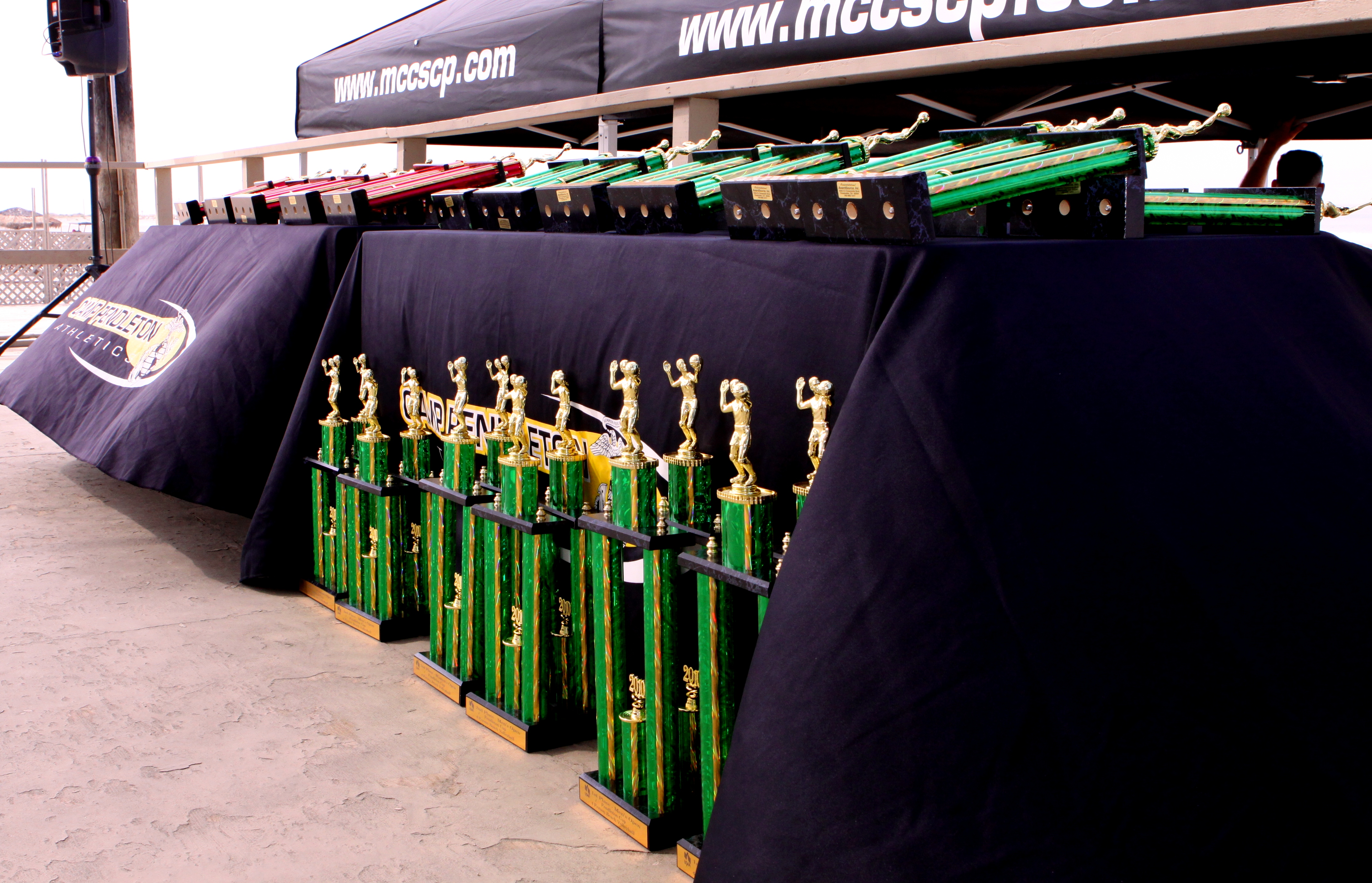
Beach Volleyball Tournament at Camp Del Mar's beach, Aug. 4, 2010

Camp Pendleton was built on a wide swath of coastal land that once supported an estuary at the mouth of the Santa Margarita River and extensive salt marsh habitat. Outlying land within the base is made up of floodplain, oak woodlands, coastal dunes and bluffs, coastal sage scrub, chaparral, and several types of wetlands, including ephemeral wetlands such as vernal pools. Wildfire is not uncommon. Research in ecology takes place on undeveloped areas of the base, which contain examples of rare and endangered California habitat types. The Department of Defense has issued management plans for various ecosystems on this territory.

Land within the base still includes breeding habitat for birds such as the western snowy plover and California gnatcatcher. The coastal bluffs have many of the few existing specimens of the Pendleton button-celery, which was named for the base. Rare mammals on the base include the Pacific pocket mouse and Stephens's kangaroo rat.

=== Bison ===
Fourteen American bison were introduced from the San Diego Zoo between 1973 and 1979. They roam the Delta and Charlie training areas, Zulu Impact Area and Case Springs on the base. In early 2021, there were around 90 adults, and 14 calves were expected in April.

== Education ==
Dependents on base are zoned to schools operated by local school districts. The Camp Pendleton property does not have any Department of Defense Education Activity (DoDEA) schools. The Oceanside Unified School District covers portions of the base and operates the following on-post schools: Santa Margarita School (K-8 school), North Terrace Elementary School, Stuart Mesa Elementary School, and Stuart Mesa Middle School. The Fallbrook Union Elementary School District operates the following on-post schools: Mary Fay Elementary School, San Onofre Elementary School, Mary Fay Middle School, and San Onofre Middle School. Some portions of the base are assigned to the Capistrano Unified School District.

Oceanside USD-zoned areas on Camp Pendleton property are assigned to Oceanside High School. The San Diego Association of Governments (SANDAG) stated that the school "has been noted as an important resource for the Camp Pendleton community as it serves as the high school for many students of military families since there is no high school on base." Fallbrook Union ESD feeds into Fallbrook Union High School District, which operates Fallbrook High School. The Capistrano district operates San Clemente High School. The base has no on-post high schools.

== See also ==
- Camp Pendleton North and Camp Pendleton South – two census-designated places (CDP) at the base
- Caruso Memorial Chapel
- List of United States Marine Corps installations
- Marine Corps Air Station Camp Pendleton
- WWII/Korea LVT Museum at Camp Del Mar
